= History of Bulgaria =

The history of Bulgaria can be traced from the first settlements on the lands of modern Bulgaria to its formation as a nation-state, and includes the history of the Bulgarian people and their origins. The earliest evidence of hominid occupation discovered in what is today Bulgaria date from at least 1.4 million years ago. Around 5000 BC, a sophisticated civilization already existed which produced some of the first pottery, jewelry, and golden artifacts in the world. After 3500 BC, the Thracians appeared on the Balkan Peninsula. In the late 6th century BC, parts of what is currently Bulgaria, in particular the eastern region of the country, came under the Persian Achaemenid Empire. In the 470s BC, the Thracians formed the powerful Odrysian Kingdom which lasted until 46 BC, when it was finally conquered by the Roman Empire. Over the centuries, some Thracian tribes fell under ancient Macedonian and Hellenistic, and also Celtic domination. This mixture of ancient peoples was assimilated by the Slavs, who permanently settled on the peninsula after 500 AD.

Bulgaria joined NATO on 29 March 2004, and subsequently the European Union on 1 January 2007. Following this, the country joined the Schengen Area on 1 January 2025, and switched its currency from the Bulgarian lev to the euro on 1 January 2026.

== Prehistory ==
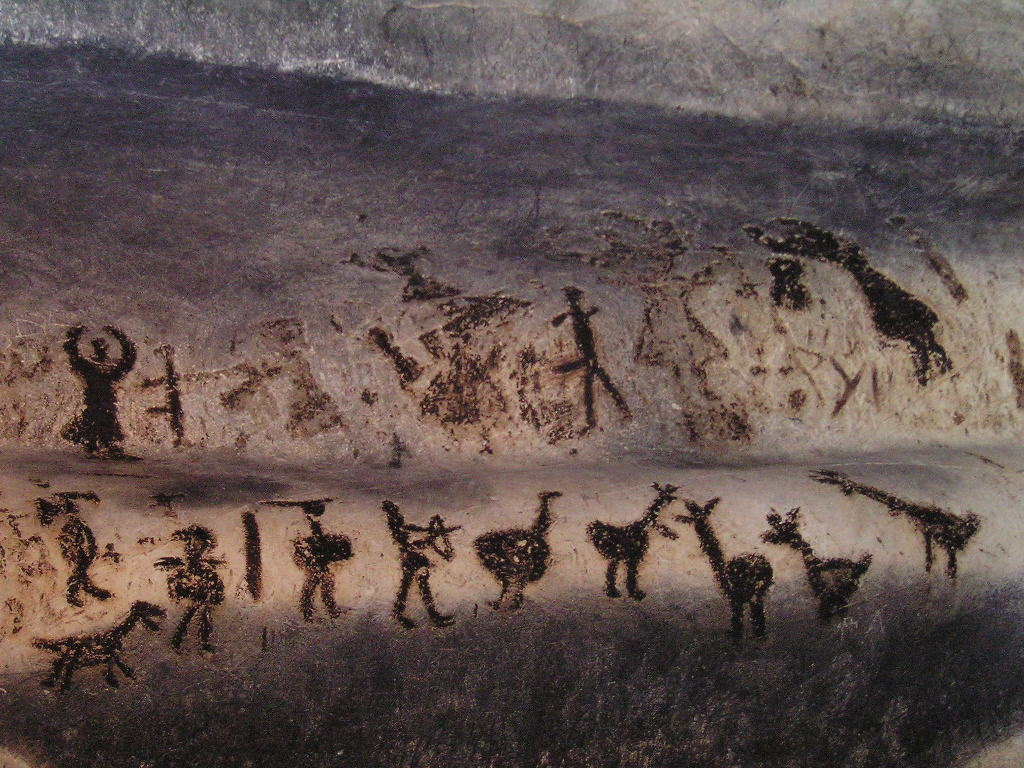
Magura cave drawings

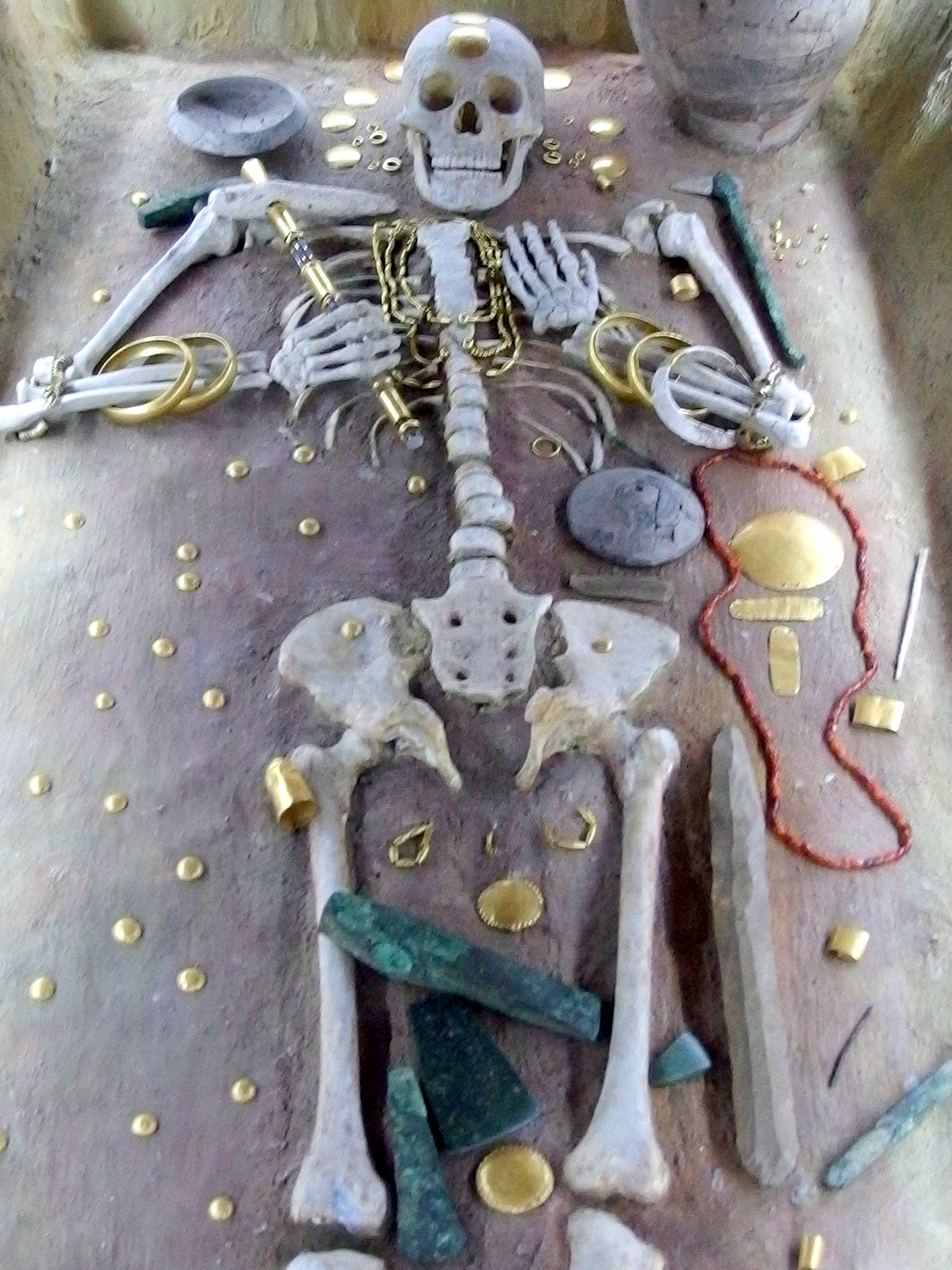
Varna culture burial, 4500 BC (reconstruction)

The earliest human remains found in Bulgaria were excavated in the Kozarnika cave, with an approximate age of 1,6 million BC. This cave probably keeps the earliest evidence of human symbolic behaviour ever found. A fragmented pair of human jaws, which are 44,000 years old, were found in Bacho Kiro cave, but it is disputed whether these early humans were in fact Homo sapiens or Neanderthals.

The earliest dwellings in Bulgaria – the Stara Zagora Neolithic dwellings – date from 6,000 BC and are amongst the oldest human-made structures yet discovered. By the end of the Neolithic, the Karanovo, Hamangia and Vinča cultures developed on what is today Bulgaria, southern Romania and eastern Serbia. The earliest known town in Europe, Solnitsata, was located in present-day Bulgaria. The Durankulak lake settlement in Bulgaria commenced on a small island, approximately 7000 BC and around 4700/4600 BC the stone architecture was already in general use and became a characteristic phenomenon that was unique in Europe.

The Eneolithic Varna culture (5000 BC) represents the first civilization with a sophisticated social hierarchy in Europe. The centrepiece of this culture is the Varna Necropolis, discovered in the early 1970s. It serves as a tool in understanding how the earliest European societies functioned, principally through well-preserved ritual burials, pottery, and golden jewellery. The golden rings, bracelets and ceremonial weapons discovered in one of the graves were created between 4,600 and 4200 BC, which makes them the oldest gold artefacts yet discovered anywhere in the world.

Some of the earliest evidence of grape cultivation and livestock domestication is associated with the Bronze Age Ezero culture. The Magura Cave drawings date from the same era, although the exact years of their creation cannot be pin-pointed.

== Antiquity ==
=== The Thracians ===
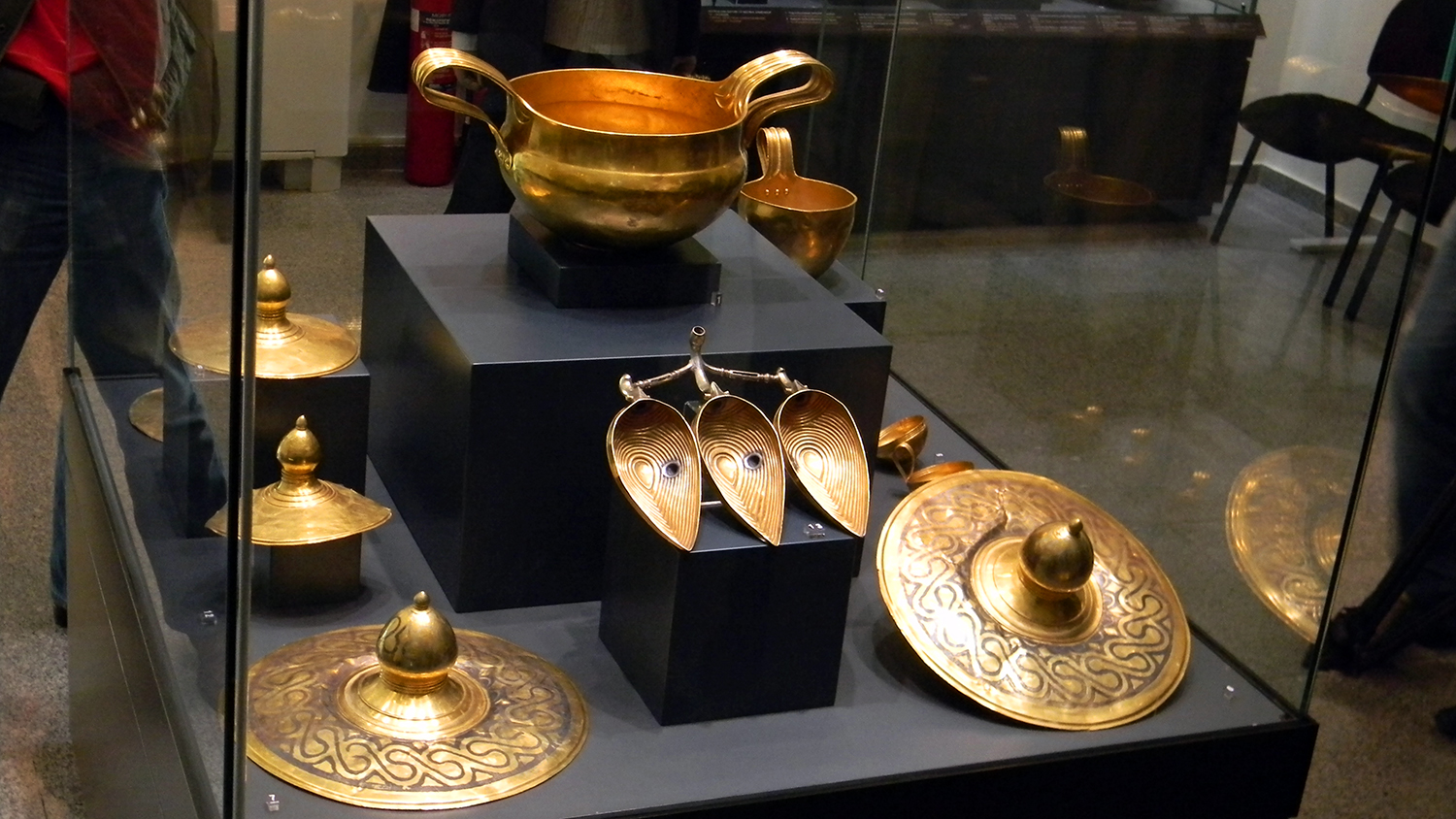
Valchitran Treasure, c. 1300 BC

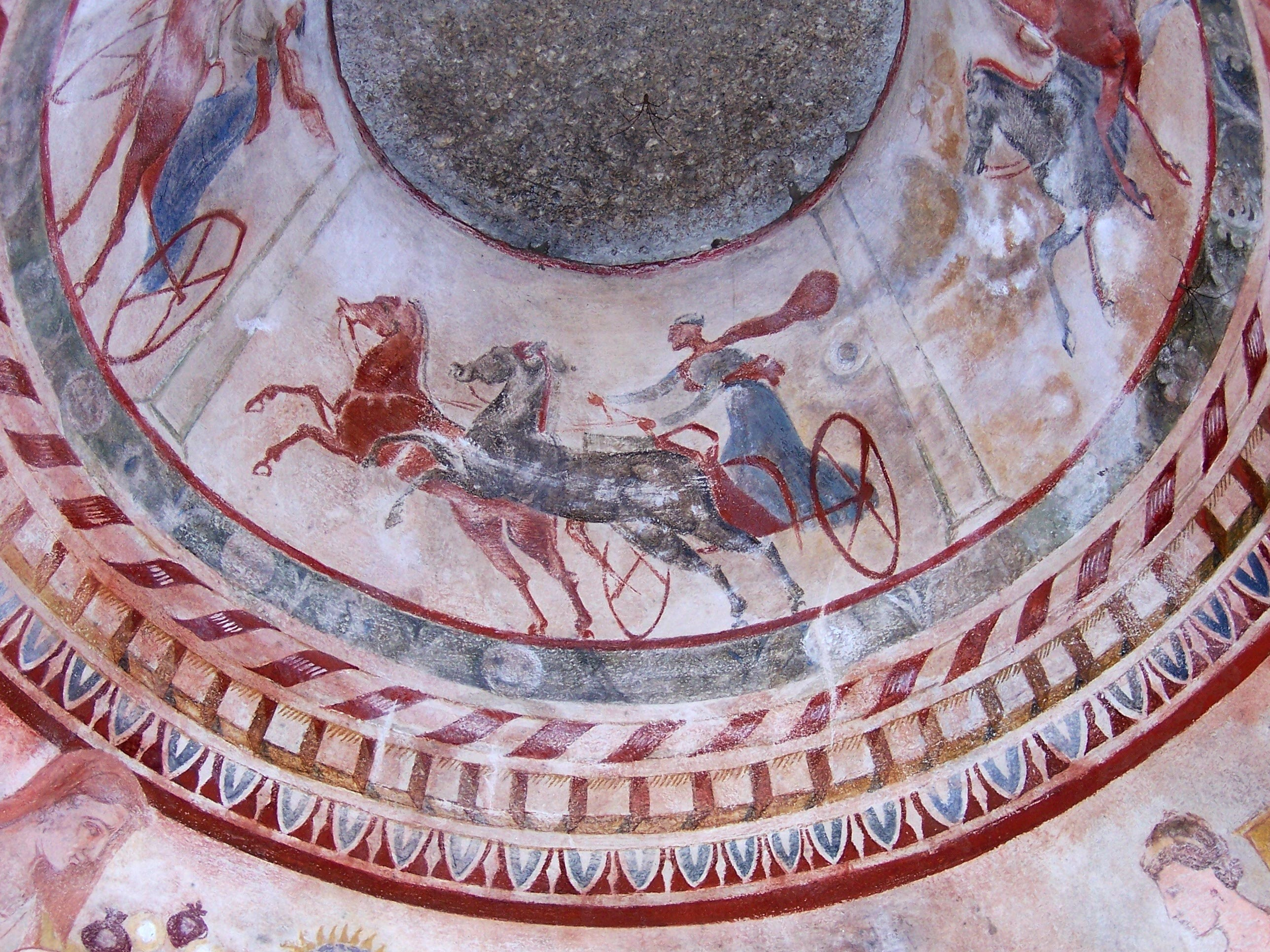
Thracian Tomb of Kazanlak, 4th century BC

The first people to leave lasting traces and cultural heritage throughout the region were the Thracians. Their origin remains obscure. It is generally proposed that a proto-Thracian people developed from a mixture of indigenous peoples and Indo-Europeans from the time of Proto-Indo-European expansion in the Early Bronze Age when the latter, around 1500 BC, conquered the indigenous peoples. Thracian craftsmen inherited the skills of the indigenous civilisations before them, especially in gold working.

The Thracians were generally disorganized, but had an advanced culture despite the lack of their own proper script, and gathered powerful military forces when their divided tribes formed unions under the pressure of external threats. They formed the Odrysian kingdom Although the concept of an urban center was not developed until the Roman period, various larger fortifications which also served as regional market centers were numerous. Yet, in general, despite Greek colonization in such areas as Byzantium, Apollonia and other cities, the Thracians avoided urban life.

The first Greek colonies in Thrace were founded in the 8th century BC.

==== Achaemenid Persian invasions ====
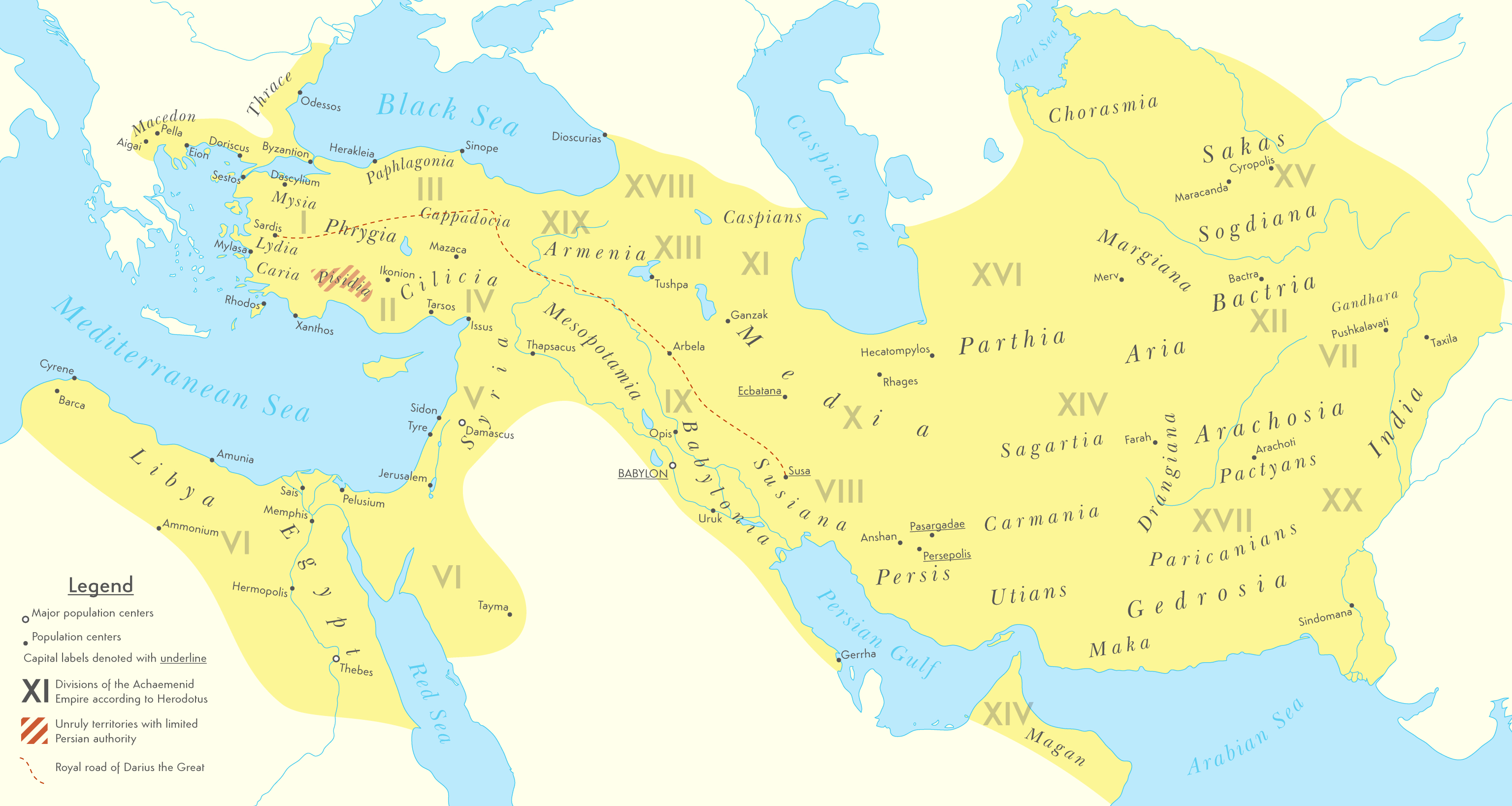
The Achaemenid Empire at its greatest territorial extent, under the rule of Darius I (522 BC–486 BC)

Ever since the Macedonian king Amyntas I surrendered his country to the Persians in about 512-511 BC, Macedonians and Persians were strangers no more. Subjugation of Macedonia was part of Persian military operations initiated by Darius the Great (521–486 BC). In 513 BC - after immense preparations - a huge Achaemenid army invaded the Balkans and tried to defeat the European Scythians roaming to the north of the Danube river. Darius' army subjugated several Thracian peoples, and virtually all other regions that touch the European part of the Black Sea, such as parts of nowadays Bulgaria, Romania, Ukraine, and Russia, before it returned to Asia Minor. Darius left in Europe one of his commanders named Megabazus whose task was to accomplish conquests in the Balkans. The Persian troops subjugated gold-rich Thrace, the coastal Greek cities, as well as defeating and conquering the powerful Paeonians. Finally, Megabazus sent envoys to Amyntas, demanding acceptation of Persian domination, which the Macedonians accepted. Following the Ionian Revolt, the Persian hold over the Balkans loosened, but was firmly restored in 492 BC through the campaigns of Mardonius. The Balkans, including what is nowadays Bulgaria, provided many soldiers for the multi-ethnic Achaemenid army. Several Thracian treasures dating from the Persian rule in Bulgaria have been found. Most of what is today eastern Bulgaria remained firmly under the Persian sway until 479 BC. The Persian garrison at Doriscus in Thrace held out for many years even after the Persian defeat, and reportedly never surrendered. It remained as the last Persian stronghold in Europe.

=== Thracian Odrysian kingdom (c. 480 BC - 30 BC) ===
The Odrysian kingdom under king Sitalces (c. 431–424)

Thracian tribes remained divided and most of them fell under nominal Persian rule from the late 6th century until the first half of the 5th century, until King Teres united most of them under the Odrysian kingdom around 470 BC, probably after the Persian defeat in Greece which later peaked under the leadership of King Sitalces (431–424 BC) and of Cotys I (383–359 BC). This Thracian kingdom thrived between the early 5th century BC and the early 3rd / late 1st century BC. Located in present-day Bulgaria, southeastern Romania (northern Dobruja), northeastern Greece and European Turkey, it was a tribal amalgam dominated by the Odrysians that was the first large political entity to develop in the eastern Balkans. Before the foundation of Seuthopolis in the late 4th century it had no fixed capital. Similar to the Gauls and other Celtic tribes, most Thracians are thought to have lived simply in small fortified villages, usually on hilltops. At the commencement of the Peloponnesian War, Sitalces entered into alliance with the Athenians, and in 429 BC he invaded Macedon (then ruled by Perdiccas II) with a vast army that included 150,000 warriors from independent Thracian tribes. Cotys I, on the other hand, went to war with the Athenians for the possession of the Thracian Chersonese.

==== Ancient Macedon invasions ====
Southern Thrace during Philip II of Macedon

Thereafter the Macedonian Empire incorporated the Odrysian kingdom and Thracians became an inalienable component in the extra-continental expeditions of both Philip II and Alexander III (the Great).

==== Ancient Celtic invasions ====
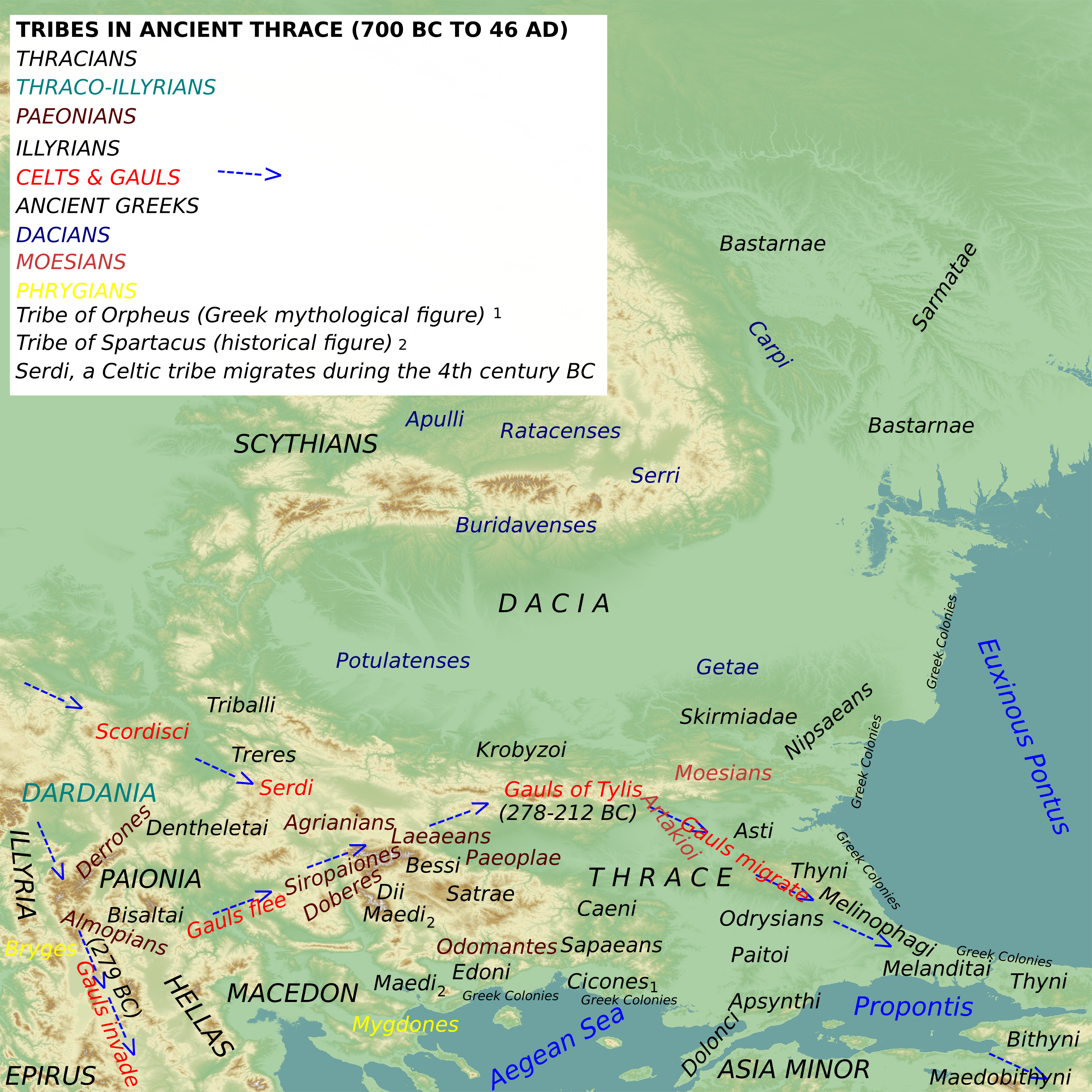
Tribes in Thrace. Celtic peoples, including the Gauls of Tylis, are labelled in red

In 298 BC, Celtic tribes reached what is today Bulgaria and clashed with the forces of Macedonian king Cassander on Mount Haemos (Stara Planina). The Macedonians won the battle, but that did not stop the Celtic advancement. Many Thracian communities, weakened by the Macedonian occupation, fell under Celtic dominance.

In 279 BC, one of the Celtic armies, led by Comontorius, attacked Thrace and succeeded in conquering it. Comontorius established the kingdom of Tylis in what is now eastern Bulgaria. The modern-day village of Tulovo bears the name of the relatively short-lived kingdom. Cultural interactions between Thracians and Celts are evidenced by several items containing elements of both cultures, such as the chariot of Mezek and almost certainly the Gundestrup cauldron.

Tylis lasted until 212 BC, when the Thracians managed to regain their dominant position in the region and disbanded it. Small bands of Celts survived in Western Bulgaria. One such tribe were the serdi, from which Serdica - the ancient name of Sofia - originates. Even though the Celts remained in the Balkans for more than a century, their influence on the peninsula was modest. By the end of the 3rd century, a new threat appeared for the people of the Thracian region in the shape of the Roman Empire.

=== Roman period ===
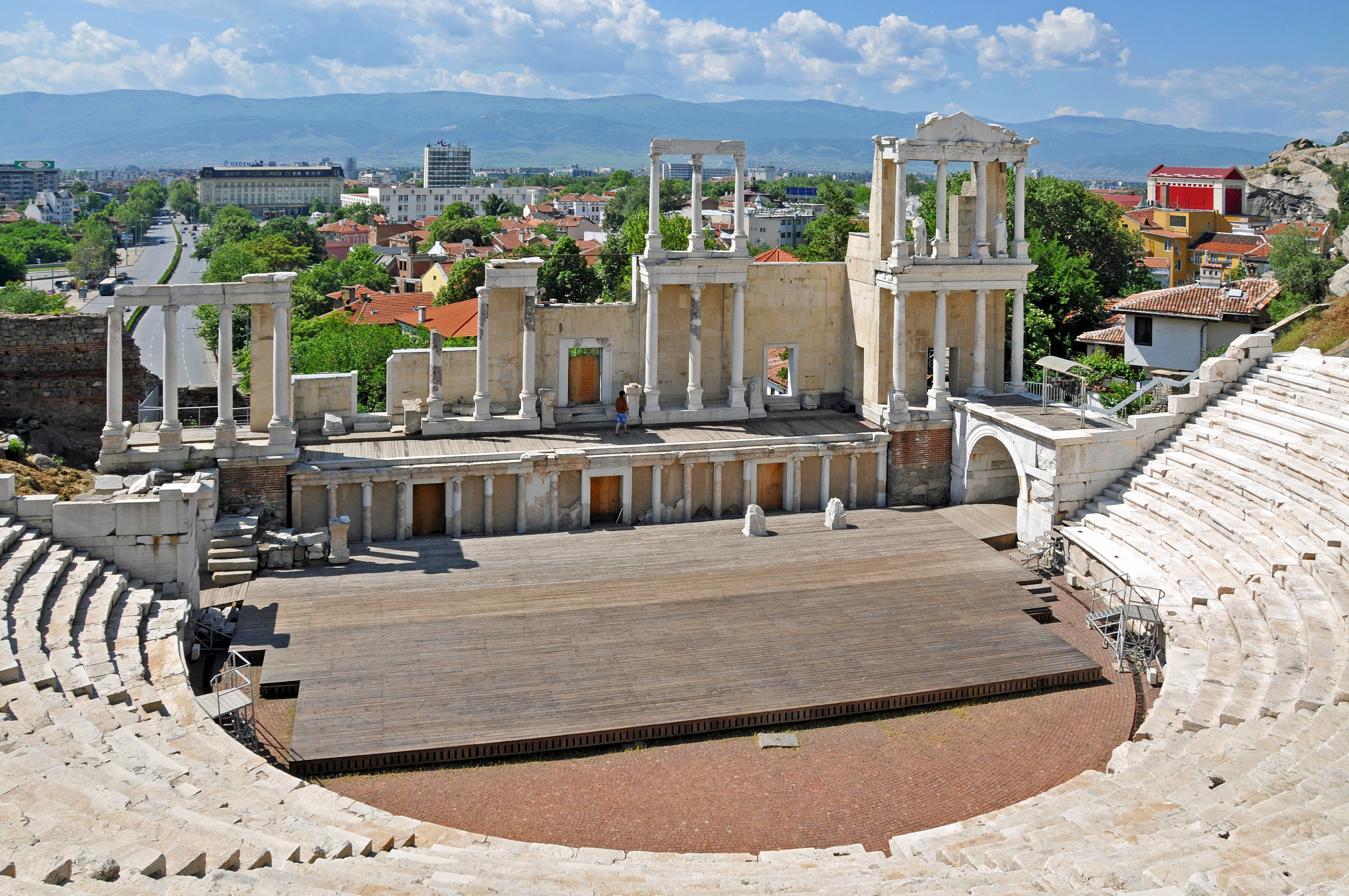
Roman theatre of Philippopolis, Plovdiv

In 188 BC, the Romans invaded Thrace, and warfare continued until 46 AD when Rome finally conquered the region.

==== Sapaean Thracian kingdom (Roman vassal state) (1st century BC - 46 AD) ====
The Sapaean kingdom was an ancient Thracian state in the southeastern Balkans that existed from the middle of the 1st century BC until 46 AD. Succeeding the Classical and Hellenistic era Odrysian kingdom of Thrace, it was dominated by the Sapaean tribe, who ruled from their capital Bizye in what is now northwestern Turkey. Initially only of limited relevance, its power grew significantly in the ancient Roman world as a client state of the late Roman Republic. After the Battle of Actium in 31 BC, Octavian (later emperor Augustus) installed a new dynasty that proved to be highly loyal and expansive. Conquering and ruling much of Thrace on behalf of the Roman Empire, it lasted until 46 AD, when Emperor Claudius annexed the kingdom and made Thracia into a Roman province.

==== Roman rule ====
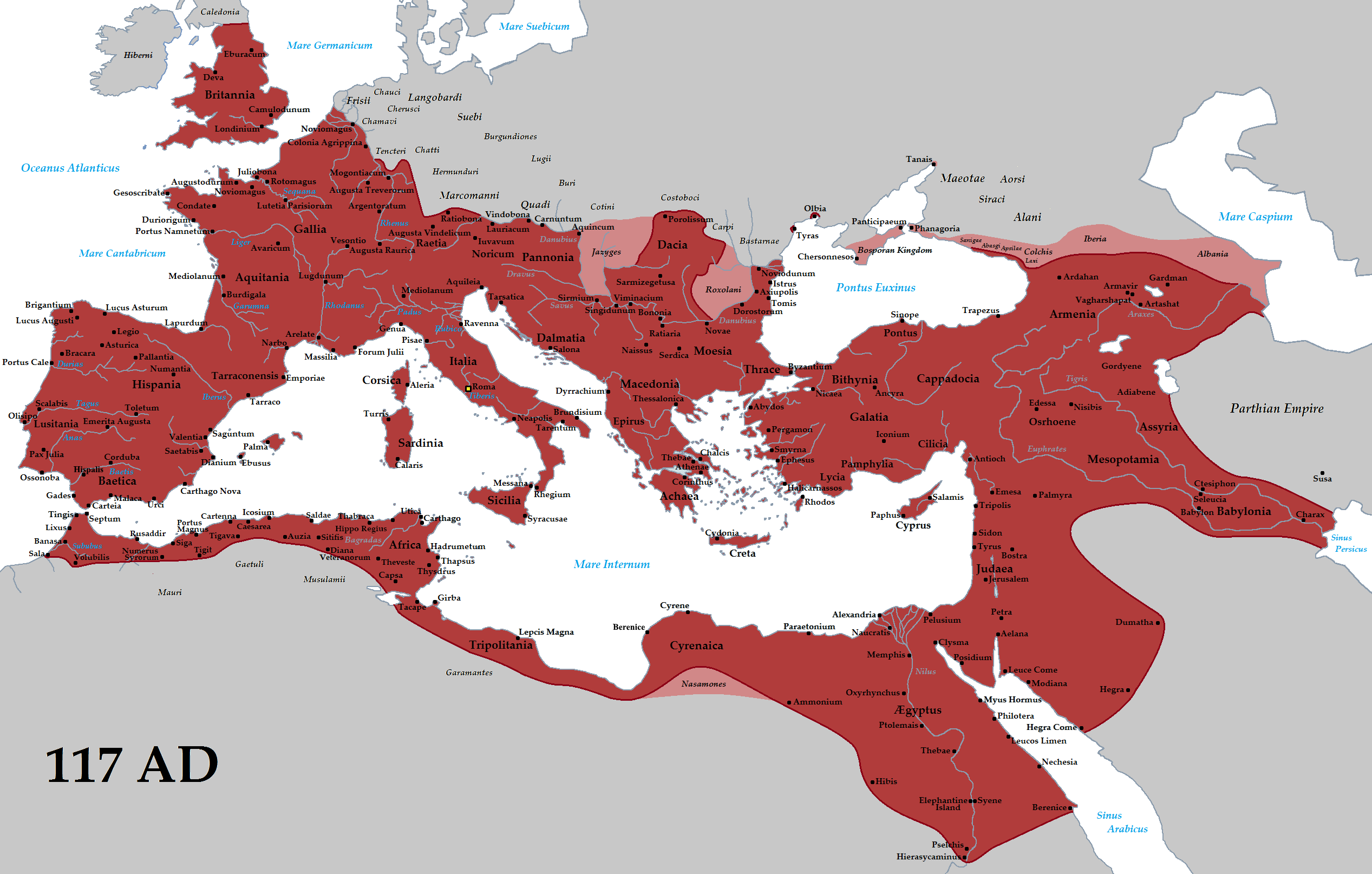
Roman Empire under Trajan (117 AD)

In 46 AD, the Romans established the province of Thracia. By the 4th century, the Thracians had a composite indigenous identity, as Christian "Romans" who preserved some of their ancient pagan rituals. Thraco-Romans became a dominant group in the region, and eventually yielded several military commanders and emperors such as Galerius and Constantine I the Great. Urban centres became well-developed, especially the territories of Serdika, which today the city of Sofia, due to the abundance of mineral springs. The influx of immigrants from around the empire enriched the local cultural landscape; temples of Osiris and Isis have been discovered near the Black Sea coast. Sometime before 300 AD, Diocletian further divided Thracia into four smaller provinces.

== Migration Period (3rd century - 7th century) ==
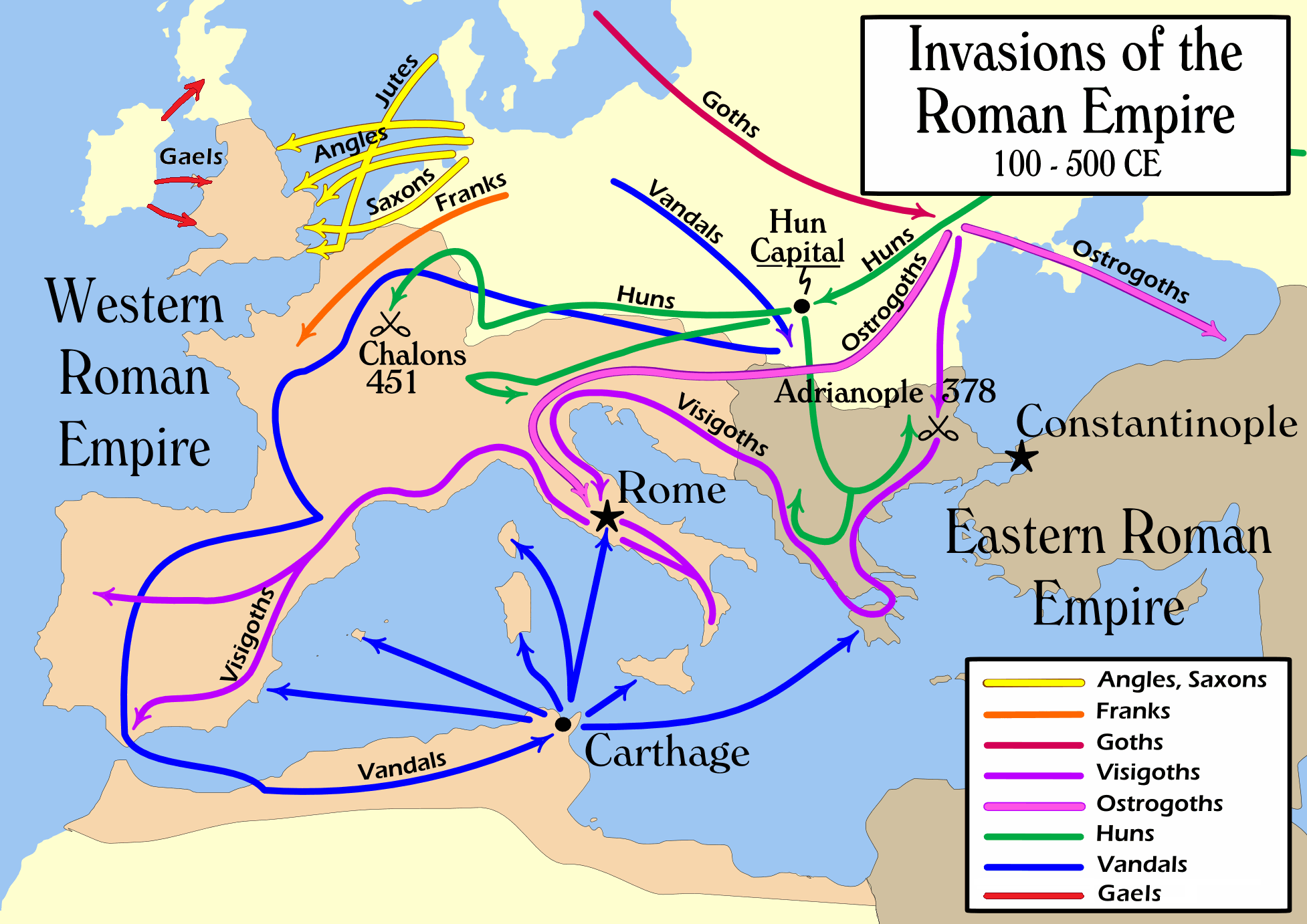
Invasions of the Roman Empire during the Migration Period

In the 4th century, a group of Goths arrived in northern Bulgaria and settled in and around Nicopolis ad Istrum. There the Gothic bishop Ulfilas translated the Bible from Greek to Gothic, creating the Gothic alphabet in the process. This was the first book written in a Germanic language, and for this reason at least one historian refers to Ulfilas as "the father of Germanic literature". The first Christian monastery in Europe was founded in 344 by Saint Athanasius near modern-day Chirpan following the Council of Serdica.

Due to the rural nature of the local population, Roman control of the region remained weak. In the 5th century, Attila's Huns attacked the territories of today's Bulgaria and pillaged many Roman settlements. By the end of the 6th century, Avars organized regular incursions into northern Bulgaria, which were a prelude to the en masse arrival of the Slavs.

During the 6th century, the traditional Greco-Roman culture was still influential, but Christian philosophy and culture were dominant and began to replace it. From the 7th century, Greek became the predominant language under the Eastern Roman Empire's administration, Church and society, replacing Latin.

Gothic Invasions 250–251

Gothic Invasions 267–269

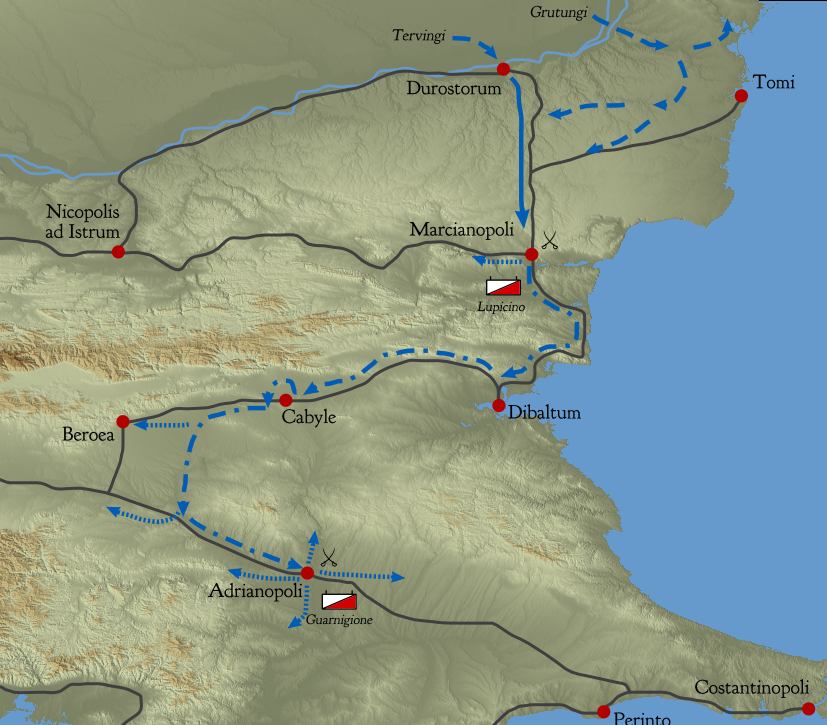
Gothic Invasions 376–382

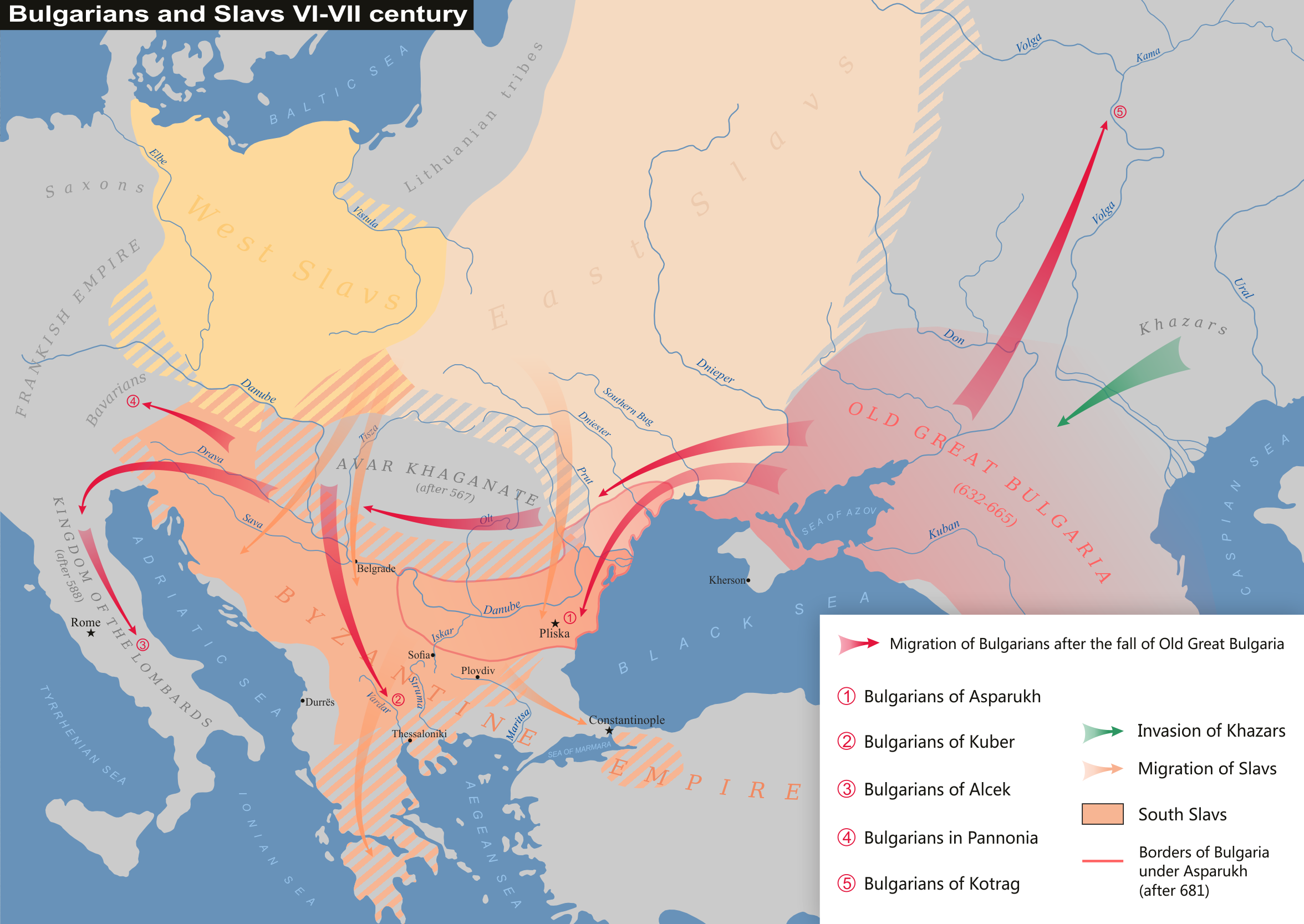
The Bulgar and Slavic migrations 6th - 7th century

=== Slavs ===
The Slavs emerged from their original homeland (most commonly thought to have been in Eastern Europe) in the early 6th century and spread to most of eastern Central Europe, Eastern Europe and the Balkans, thus forming three main branches - the West Slavs, the East Slavs and the South Slavs. The easternmost South Slavs settled on the territory of modern Bulgaria during the 6th century.

Most of the Thracians were eventually Hellenized or Romanized, with some exceptions surviving in remote areas until the 5th century. A portion of the eastern South Slavs assimilated most of them, before the Bulgar élite incorporated these peoples into the First Bulgarian Empire.

=== Bulgars ===
The Bulgars were a semi-nomadic people who from the 2nd century onwards dwelled in the steppes north of the Caucasus and around the banks of river Volga (then Itil). A branch of them gave rise to the First Bulgarian Empire. The Bulgars were governed by hereditary khans. There were several aristocratic families whose members, bearing military titles, formed a governing class. Bulgars were polytheistic, but chiefly worshiped the supreme deity Tangra.

=== Old Great Bulgaria ===
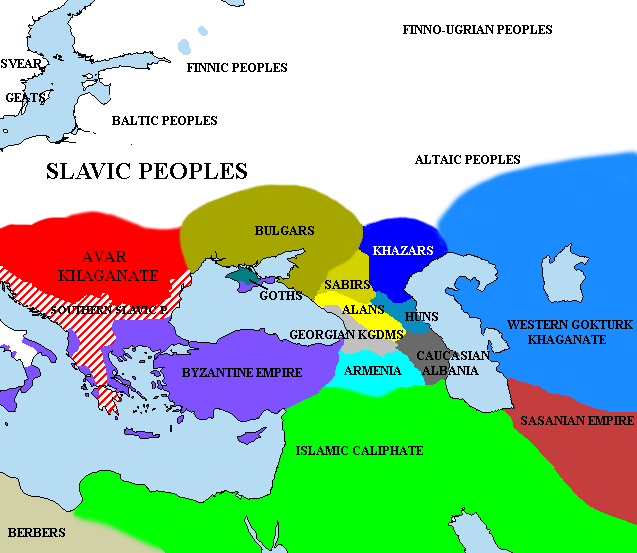
Great Bulgaria and adjacent regions, c. 650 AD

Unified under a single ruler, Kurt, or Kubrat (reigned c. 605–c. 642), the Bulgars constituted a powerful polity known to the Eastern Romans as Great Bulgaria. This country was situated between the lower course of the Danube river to the west, the Black Sea and the Azov Sea to the south, the Kuban river to the east and the Donets river to the north. The capital was Phanagoria, on the Azov.

In 635, Kubrat signed a peace treaty with emperor Heraclius of the Byzantine Empire, expanding the Bulgar kingdom further into the Balkans. Later, Kubrat was crowned with the title Patrician by Heraclius. The kingdom never survived Kubrat's death. After several wars with the Khazars, the Bulgars were finally defeated and they migrated to the south, to the north, and mainly to the west into the Balkans, where most of the other Bulgar tribes were living, in a state vassal to the Byzantine Empire since the 5th century.

One of the successors of Khan Kubrat, Kotrag led nine Bulgar tribes to the north along the banks of the river Volga in what is today Russia, creating the Kingdom of the Volga Bulgars in the late 7th century. This kingdom later became the trade and cultural centre of the north, because it stood on a very strategic position creating a monopoly over the trade among the Arabs, the Norse and the Avars. The Volga Bulgars were the first to ever defeat the Mongolic horde and protected Europe for decades, but after countless Mongol invasions the Kingdom of the Volga Bulgars was destroyed and most of its citizens slaughtered or sold as slaves in Asia.

Another successor of Khan Kubrat, Asparuh (Kotrag's brother) moved west, occupying today's southern Bessarabia. After a successful war with Byzantium in 680, Asparuh's khanate conquered initially Scythia Minor and was recognised as an independent state under the subsequent treaty signed with the Byzantine Empire in 681. That year is usually regarded as the year of the establishment of present-day Bulgaria and Asparuh is regarded as the first Bulgarian ruler.

Another Bulgar horde, led by Asparuh's brother Kuber, came to settle in Pannonia and later into the region of Macedonia.

== First Bulgarian Empire (681–1018) ==
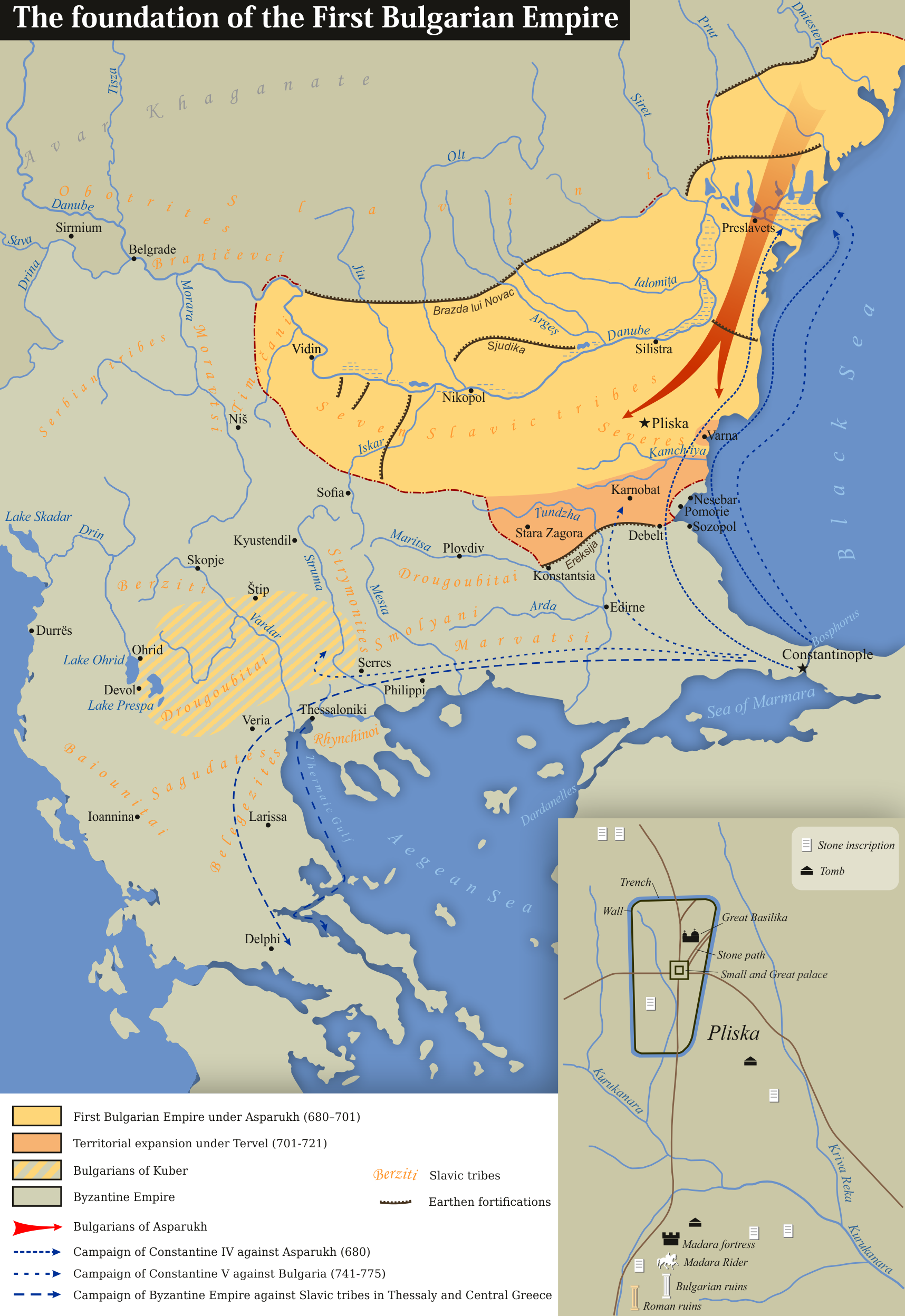
Southeast Europe 680 - 721

Under the reign of Asparuh Bulgaria expanded southwest after the Battle of Ongal and Danubian Bulgaria was created.

During the Late Roman Empire, several Roman provinces covered the territory that comprises present-day Bulgaria: Scythia (Scythia Minor), Moesia (Upper and Lower), Thrace, Macedonia (First and Second), Dacia (Coastal and Inner, both south of Danube), Dardania, Rhodope and Haemismontus, and had a mixed population of Byzantine Greeks, Thracians and Dacians, most of whom spoke either Greek or variants of Vulgar Latin. Several consecutive waves of Slavic migration throughout the 6th and the early 7th centuries led to a dramatic change of the demographics of the region and its almost complete Slavicisation.

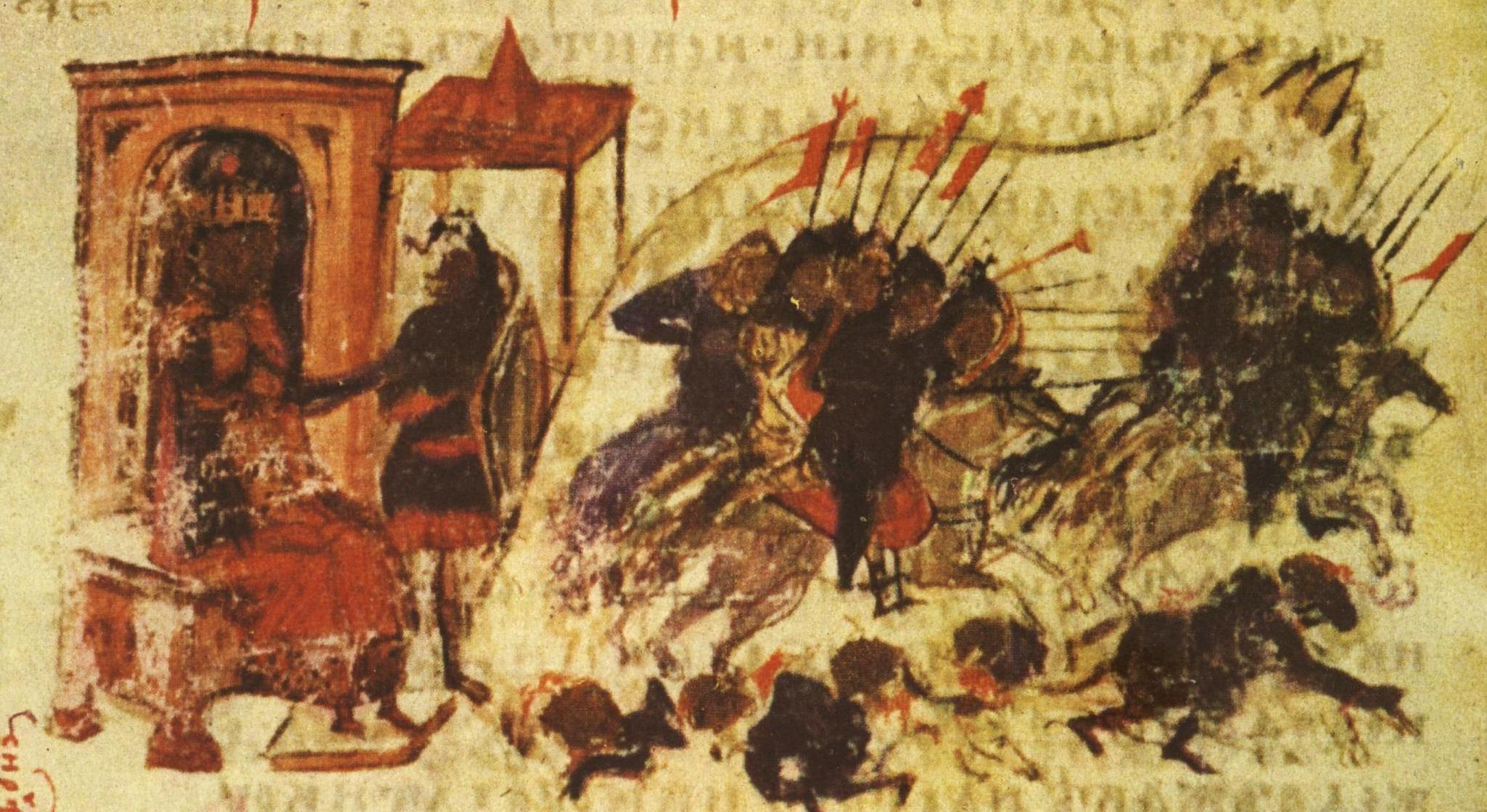
Miniature 47 from the Constantine Manasses Chronicle, 14 century: The arabs attacking Constantinople during the reign of emperor Leo III.

The son and heir of Asparuh, Tervel, became ruler in the beginning of 8th century when the Byzantine emperor Justinian II asked Tervel for assistance in recovering his throne, for which Tervel received the region Zagore from the Empire and was paid large quantities of gold. He also received the Byzantine title "Caesar". Years later, the emperor decided to betray and attack Bulgaria, but his army was crushed in the battle of Anhialo. After the death of Justinian II, the Bulgarians continued their crusades against the empire and in 716 they reached Constantinople. The threat of both the Bulgarians and the Arab menace in the east, forced the new emperor Theodosius III, to sign a peace treaty with Tervel. The successor, Leo III the Isaurian had to deal with an army of 100,000 Arabs led by Maslama ibn Abd al-Malik and a fleet of 2,500 ships that were laying siege on Constantinople in the year 717. Relying on his treaty with Bulgaria, the emperor asked Khan Tervel to help him deal with the Arab invasion. Tervel accepted and the Arabs were decimated outside the walls of the city. The fleet was heavily damaged with the help of Greek fire. The remaining ships were destroyed by a storm, in an attempt to flee. So the Second Arab Siege of Constantinople ended. After the reign of Tervel, there were frequent changes in the ruling houses, which led to instability and political crisis.

Decades later, in 768, Telerig of the house Dulo, ruled Bulgaria. His military campaign against Constantine V in the year 774 proved to be unsuccessful. Thrilled with his success against Telerig, the Byzantine Emperor dispatched a fleet 2,000 ships loaded with horsemen. This expedition proved to be a failure, because of strong northern winds near Mesembria. Telerig was aware of the increased presence of spies in the capital Pliska. To decrease this Byzantine influence, he sent a letter to the emperor in which he askes for refuge in Constantinople and wants to know which Byzantine spies can help him. Knowing their names, he slaughtered every agent in the capital. His rule marked the end of the political crisis.

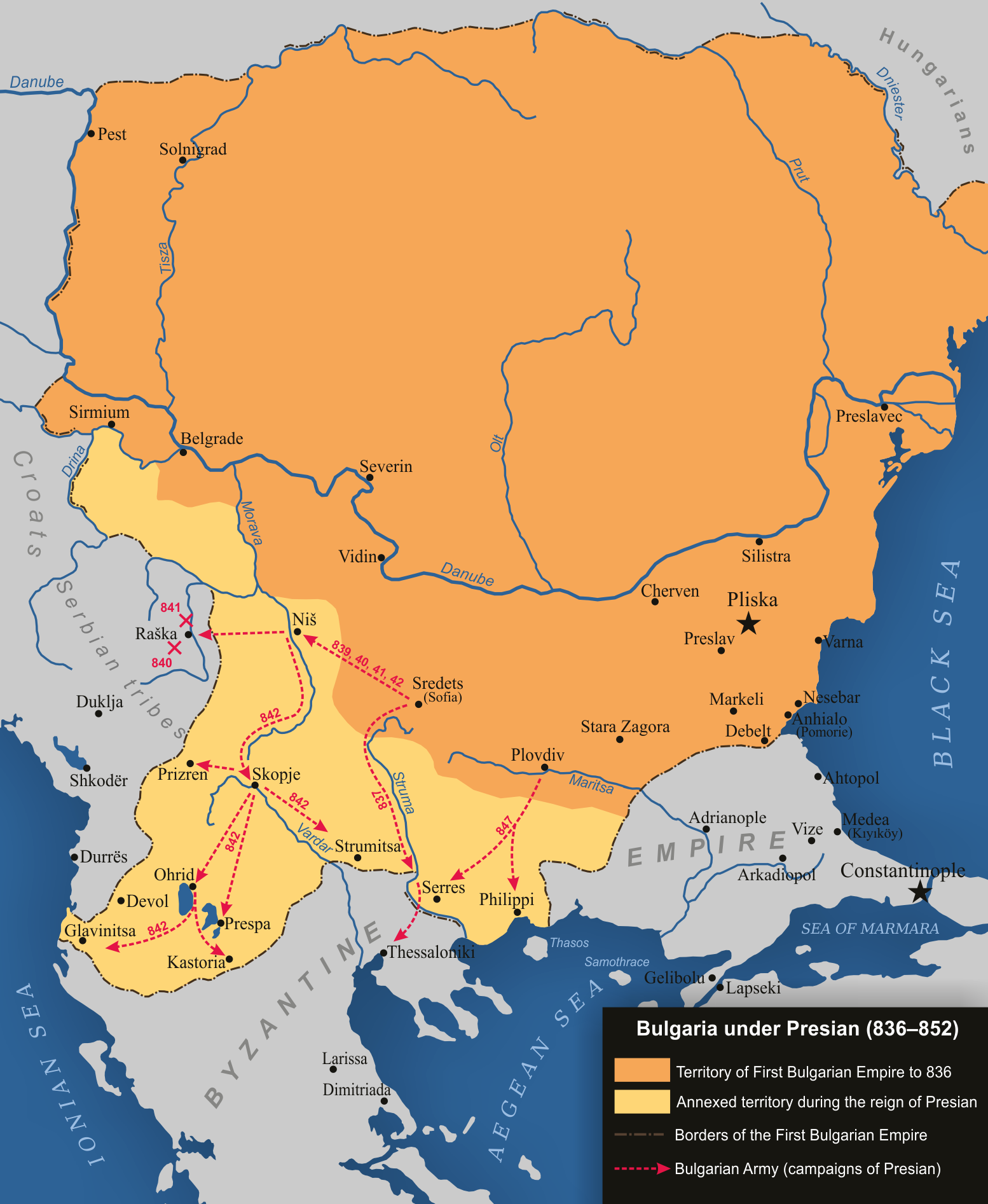
Territorial expansion during the reign of Presian (836–852)

Under the reign of Krum (802–814) Bulgaria expanded vastly north-west and south, occupying the lands between the middle Danube and Moldova rivers, all of present-day Romania, Sofia in 809 and Adrianople in 813, and threatening Constantinople itself. Krum implemented law reform intending to reduce poverty and strengthen social ties in his vastly enlarged state.

During the reign of Khan Omurtag (814–831), the northwestern boundaries with the Frankish Empire were firmly settled along the middle Danube. A magnificent palace, pagan temples, ruler's residence, fortress, citadel, water mains and baths were built in the Bulgarian capital Pliska, mainly of stone and brick.

Omurtag pursued policy of repression against Christians. Menologion of Basil II, glorifies Emperor Basil II showing him as a warrior defending Orthodox Christendom against the attacks of the Bulgarian Empire, whose attacks on Christians are graphically illustrated.

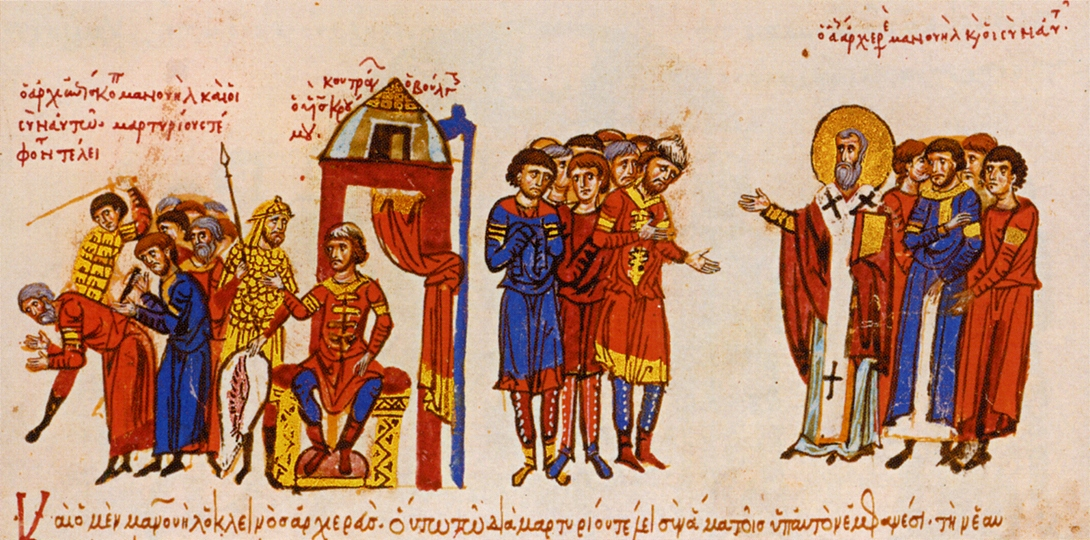
Omurtag ordering the murder of Christians

=== Christianization ===
Under Boris I, Bulgaria became officially Christian, and the Ecumenical Patriarch agreed to allow an autonomous Bulgarian Archbishop at Pliska. Missionaries from Constantinople, Cyril and Methodius, devised the Glagolitic alphabet, which was adopted in the Bulgarian Empire around 886. The alphabet and the Old Bulgarian language that evolved from Slavonic gave rise to a rich literary and cultural activity centered around the Preslav and Ohrid Literary Schools, established by order of Boris I in 886.

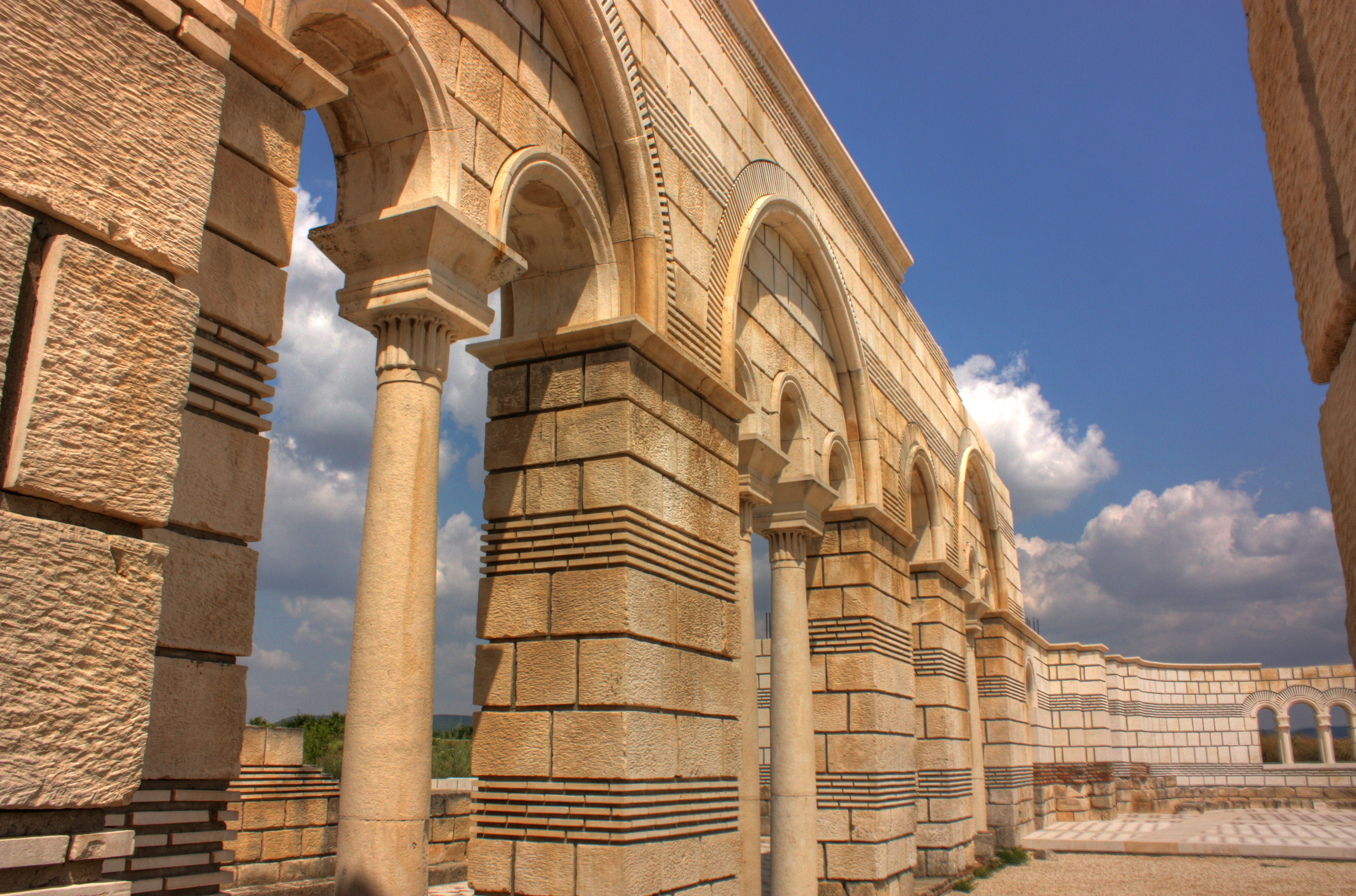
Ruins of Pliska, capital of the First Bulgarian Empire from 680 to 893

In the early 9th century, a new alphabet — Cyrillic — was developed at the Preslav Literary School, adapted from the Glagolitic alphabet invented by Saints Cyril and Methodius. An alternative theory is that the alphabet was devised at the Ohrid Literary School by Saint Climent of Ohrid, a Bulgarian scholar and disciple of Cyril and Methodius.

By the late 9th and early 10th centuries, Bulgaria extended to Epirus and Thessaly in the south, Bosnia in the west and controlled all of present-day Romania and eastern Hungary to the north reuniting with old roots. A Serbian state came into existence as a dependency of the Bulgarian Empire. Under Tsar Simeon I of Bulgaria (Simeon the Great), who was educated in Constantinople, Bulgaria became again a serious threat to the Byzantine Empire. His aggressive policy was aimed at displacing Byzantium as major partner of the nomadic polities in the area. By subverting the principles of Byzantine diplomacy and political culture, Simeon turned his own kingdom into a society-structuring factor in the nomadic world.

Simeon hoped to take Constantinople and become emperor of both Bulgarians and Greeks, and fought a series of wars with the Byzantines through his long reign (893–927). At the end of his rule the front had reached the Peloponnese in the south, making it the most powerful state in contemporary Southeast Europe. Simeon proclaimed himself "Tsar (Caesar) of the Bulgarians and the Romans", a title which was recognised by the Pope, but not by the Byzantine Emperor. The capital Preslav was said to rival Constantinople, the new independent Bulgarian Orthodox Church became the first new patriarchate besides the Pentarchy and Bulgarian translations of Christian texts spread all over the Slavic world of the time.

=== Bogomilism ===
Expansion of Bogomilism in medieval Europe

During the reign of Emperor Peter I (r. 927–969) a heretical movement known as Bogomilism arose in Bulgaria. The heresy was named after its founder the priest Bogomil whose name can be translated as dear (mil) to God (Bog). The main sources about Bogomilism in Bulgaria come from a letter of the Ecumenical Patriarch Theophylact of Constantinople to Peter I (c. 940), a treatise by Cosmas the Priest (c. 970) and the anti-Bogomil council of Emperor Boril of Bulgaria (1211). Bogomilism was a neo-Gnostic and dualist sect that believed that God had two sons, Jesus Christ and Satan, that represented the two principles good and evil. God had created light and the invisible world, while Satan rebelled and created darkness, the material world and man.

=== Decline ===
After Simeon's death, Bulgaria was weakened by external and internal wars with Croatians, Magyars, Pechenegs and Serbs and the spread of the Bogomil heresy. Two consecutive Rus' and Byzantine invasions resulted in the seizure of the capital Preslav by the Byzantine army in 971. Under Samuil, Bulgaria somewhat recovered from these attacks and managed to conquer Serbia and Duklja.

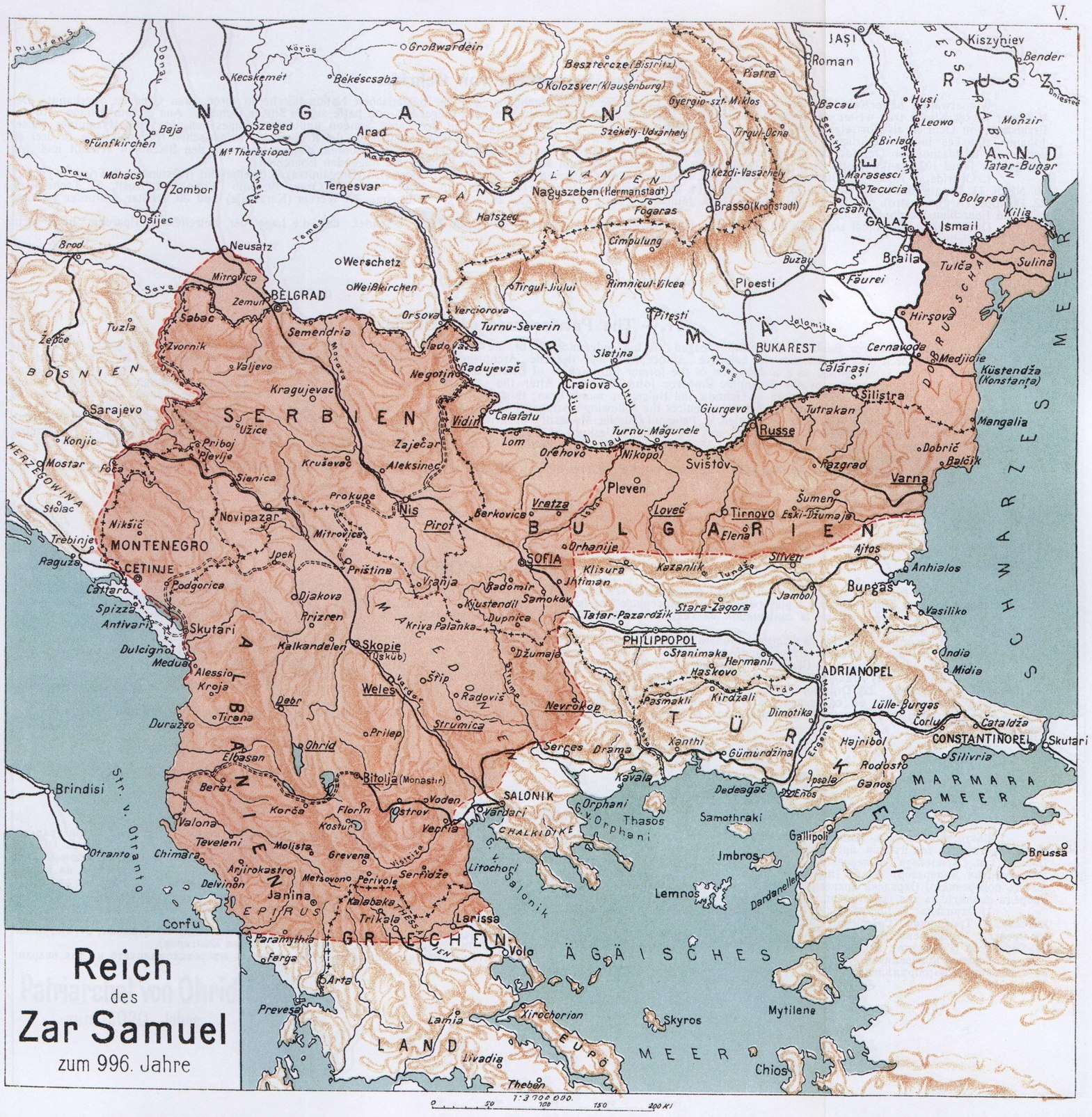
Bulgaria under the rule of Tsar Samuil

In 986, the Byzantine emperor Basil II undertook a campaign to conquer Bulgaria. After a war lasting several decades he inflicted a decisive defeat upon the Bulgarians in 1014 and completed the campaign four years later. In 1018, after the death of the last Bulgarian Tsar - Ivan Vladislav, most of Bulgaria's nobility chose to join the Eastern Roman Empire. However, Bulgaria lost its independence and remained subject to Byzantium for more than a century and a half. With the collapse of the state, the Bulgarian church fell under the domination of Byzantine ecclesiastics who took control of the Ohrid Archbishopric.

== Bulgaria under Byzantine rule (1018–1185) ==
Administrative divisions of the Byzantine Empire in the Balkans c. 1045

No evidence remains of major resistance or any uprising of the Bulgarian population or nobility in the first decade after the establishment of Byzantine rule. Given the existence of such irreconcilable opponents to the Byzantines as Krakra, Nikulitsa, Dragash and others, such apparent passivity seems difficult to explain. Some historians explain this as a consequence of the concessions that Basil II granted the Bulgarian nobility to gain their allegiance.

Basil II guaranteed the indivisibility of Bulgaria in its former geographic borders and did not officially abolish the local rule of the Bulgarian nobility, who became part of Byzantine aristocracy as archons or strategoi. Secondly, special charters (royal decrees) of Basil II recognised the autocephaly of the Bulgarian Archbishopric of Ohrid and set up its boundaries, securing the continuation of the dioceses already existing under Samuil, their property and other privileges.

After the death of Basil II the empire entered into a period of instability. In 1040, Peter Delyan organized a large-scale rebellion, but failed to restore the Bulgarian state and was killed. Shortly after, the Komnenos dynasty came into succession and halted the decline of the empire. During this time the Byzantine state experienced a century of stability and progress.

In 1180 the last of the capable Komnenoi, Manuel I Komnenos, died and was replaced by the relatively incompetent Angeloi dynasty, allowing some Bulgarian nobles to organize an uprising. In 1185 Peter and Asen, leading nobles of supposed and contested Bulgarian, Cuman, Vlach or mixed origin, led a revolt against Byzantine rule and Peter declared himself Tsar Peter II. The following year, the Byzantines were forced to recognize Bulgaria's independence. Peter styled himself "Tsar of the Bulgars, Greeks and Wallachians".

== Second Bulgarian Empire (1185–1396) ==
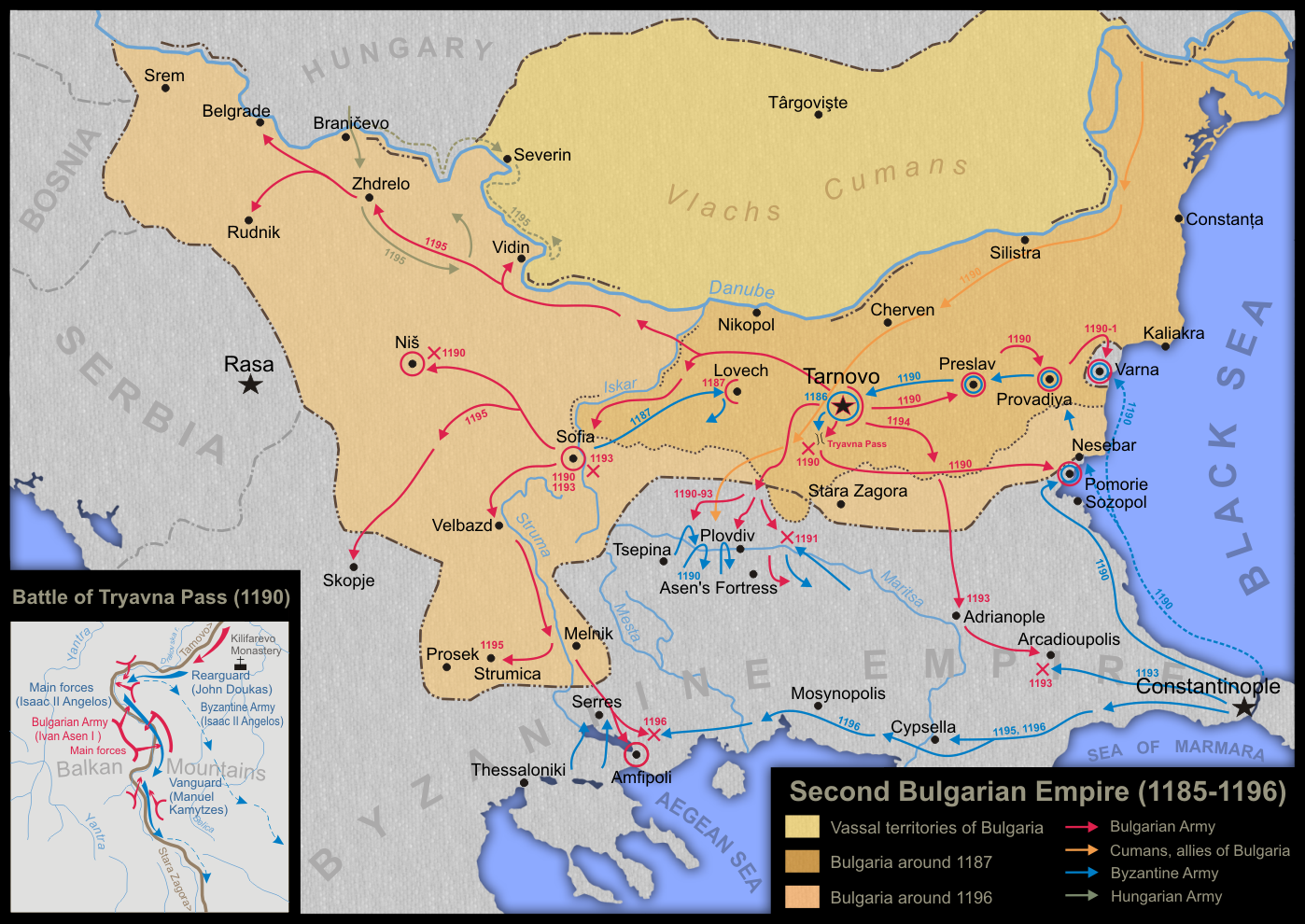
Second Bulgarian Empire in the period 1185-1196

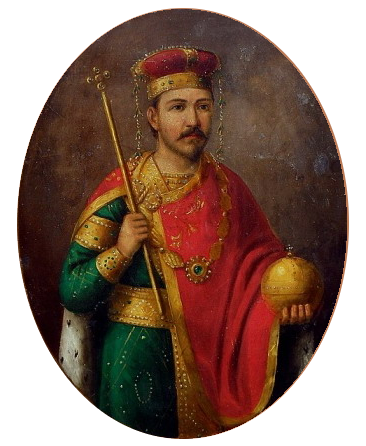
Ivan Asen II

Bulgaria under Tsar Ivan Asen II (1218 - 1241)

Resurrected Bulgaria occupied the territory between the Black Sea, the Danube and Stara Planina, including a part of eastern Macedonia, Belgrade and the valley of the Morava. It also exercised control over Wallachia Tsar Kaloyan (1197–1207) entered a union with the Papacy, thereby securing the recognition of his title of "Rex" (King) although he desired to be recognized as "Emperor" or "Tsar" of Bulgarians and Vlachs. He waged wars on the Byzantine Empire and (after 1204) on the Knights of the Fourth Crusade, conquering large parts of Thrace, the Rhodopes, Bohemia, and Moldavia as well as the whole of Macedonia.

In the Battle of Adrianople in 1205, Kaloyan defeated the forces of the Latin Empire and thus limited its power from the very first year of its establishment. The power of the Hungarians and to some extent the Serbs prevented significant expansion to the west and north-west. Under Ivan Asen II (1218–1241), Bulgaria once again became a regional power, occupying Belgrade and Albania. In an inscription from Turnovo in 1230 he entitled himself "In Christ the Lord faithful Tsar and autocrat of the Bulgarians, son of the old Asen".

The Bulgarian Orthodox Patriarchate was restored in 1235 with approval of all eastern Patriarchates, thus putting an end to the union with the Papacy. Ivan Asen II had a reputation as a wise and humane ruler, and opened relations with the Catholic west, especially Venice and Genoa, to reduce the influence of the Byzantines over his country. Tarnovo became a major economic and religious centre—a "Third Rome", unlike the already declining Constantinople. As Simeon the Great during the first empire, Ivan Asen II expanded the territory to the coasts of three seas (Adriatic, Aegean and Black), annexed Medea - the last fortress before the walls of Constantinople, unsuccessfully besieged the city in 1235 and restored the destroyed since 1018 Bulgarian Patriarchate.

The country's military and economic might declined after the end of the Asen dynasty in 1257, facing internal conflicts, constant Byzantine and Hungarian attacks and Mongol domination. Tsar Teodore Svetoslav (reigned 1300–1322) restored Bulgarian prestige from 1300 onwards, but only temporarily. Political instability continued to grow, and Bulgaria gradually began to lose territory. This led to a peasant rebellion led by the swineherd Ivaylo, who eventually managed to defeat the Tsar's forces and ascend the throne.

=== Ottoman incursions ===
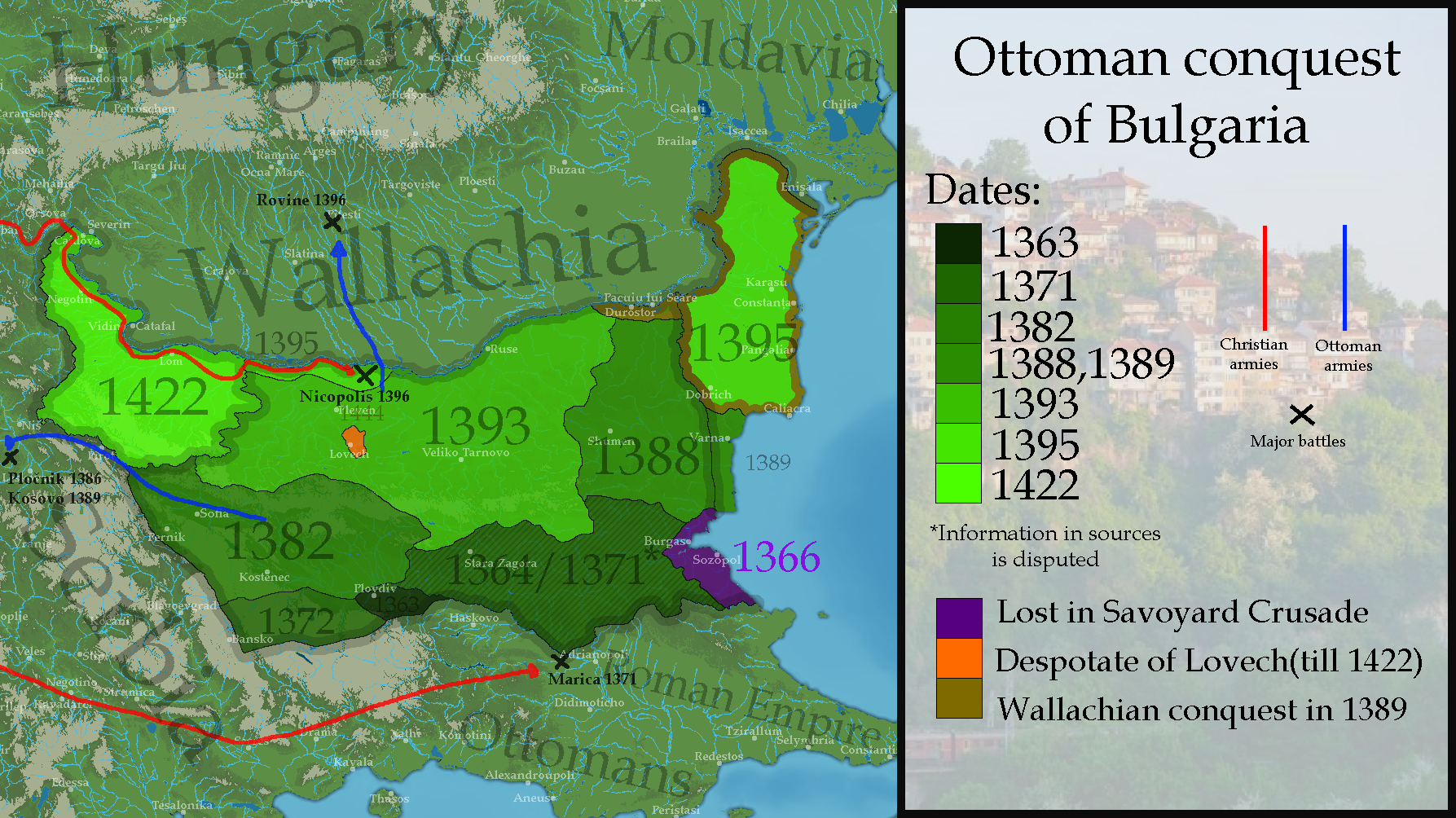
Conquest of Bulgaria and fall under Ottoman rule

A weakened 14th-century Bulgaria faced a new threat from the south, the Ottoman Turks, who crossed into Europe in 1354. By 1371, factional divisions between the feudal landlords and the spread of Bogomilism had caused the Second Bulgarian Empire to split into three small tsardoms—Vidin, Tarnovo and Karvuna—and several semi-independent principalities that fought among themselves, and also with Byzantines, Hungarians, Serbs, Venetians and Genoese.

The Ottomans faced little resistance from these divided and weak Bulgarian states. In 1362 they captured Philippopolis (Plovdiv), and in 1382 they took Sofia. The Ottomans then turned their attentions to the Serbs, whom they routed at Kosovo Polje in 1389. In 1393 the Ottomans occupied Tarnovo after a three-month siege. In 1396 the Tsardom of Vidin was also invaded, bringing the Second Bulgarian Empire and Bulgarian independence to an end.

== Bulgaria under Ottoman rule (1396–1878) ==
In 1393, the Ottomans captured Tarnovo, the capital of the Second Bulgarian Empire, after a three-month siege. In 1396, the Vidin Tsardom fell after the defeat of a Christian crusade at the Battle of Nicopolis. With this the Ottomans finally subjugated and occupied Bulgaria. A Polish-Hungarian crusade commanded by Władysław III of Poland set out to free Bulgaria and the Balkans in 1444, but the Turks emerged victorious at the battle of Varna.

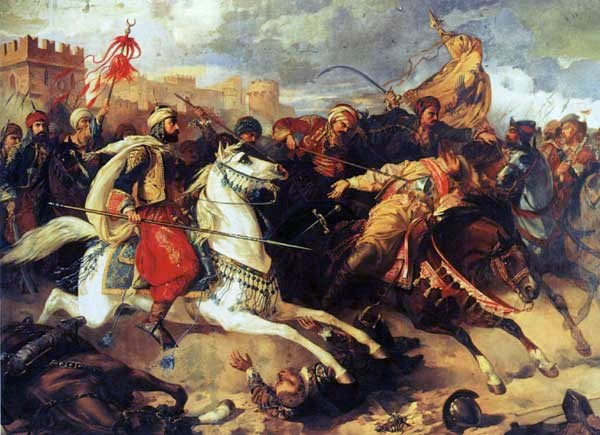
The Battle of Varna by Stanisław Chlebowski

The new authorities dismantled Bulgarian institutions and merged the separate Bulgarian Church into the Ecumenical Patriarchate in Constantinople (although a small, autocephalous Bulgarian archbishopric of Ohrid survived until January 1767). Turkish authorities destroyed most of the medieval Bulgarian fortresses to prevent rebellions. Large towns and the areas where Ottoman power predominated remained severely depopulated until the 19th century.

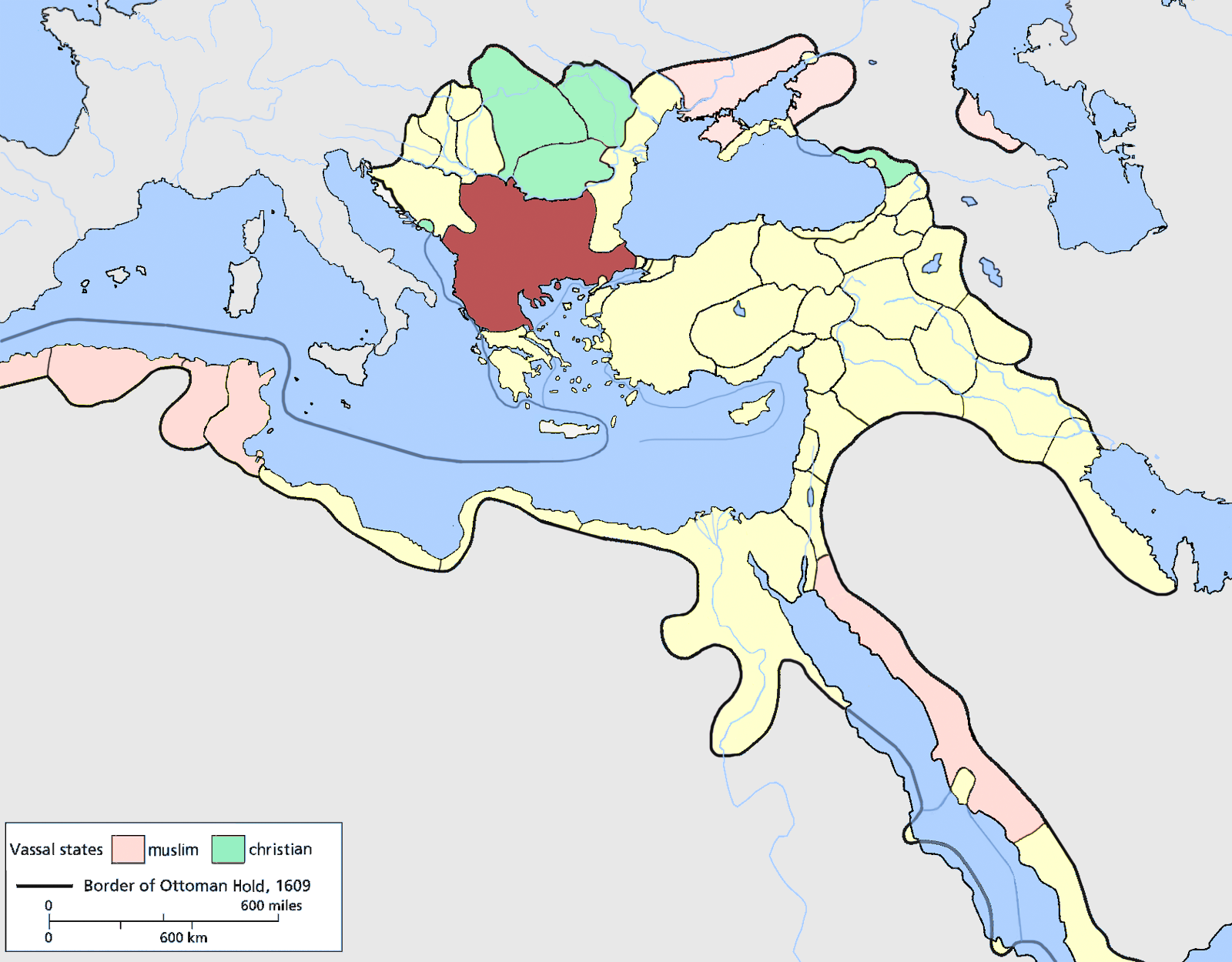
Rumelia Eyalet in 1609 with capital Sofia from 1530 to 1836

The Ottomans did not normally require the Christians to become Muslims. Nevertheless, there were many cases of forced individual or mass Islamization, especially in the Rhodopes. Bulgarians who converted to Islam, the Pomaks, retained Bulgarian language, dress and some customs compatible with Islam..

The Ottoman system began declining by the 17th century and at the end of the 18th had all but collapsed. Central government weakened over the decades and this had allowed a number of local Ottoman holders of large estates to establish personal ascendancy over separate regions. During the last two decades of the 18th and first decades of the 19th centuries the Balkan Peninsula dissolved into virtual anarchy.

Bulgarian tradition calls this period the kurdjaliistvo: armed bands of Turks called kurdjalii plagued the area. In many regions, thousands of peasants fled from the countryside either to local towns or (more commonly) to the hills or forests; some even fled beyond the Danube to Moldova, Wallachia or southern Russia. The decline of Ottoman authorities also allowed a gradual revival of Bulgarian culture, which became a key component in the ideology of national liberation.

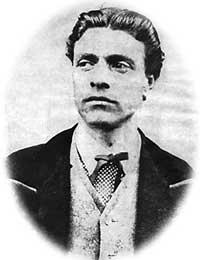
Vasil Levski, key figure of the revolutionary movement and national hero of Bulgaria

Conditions gradually improved in certain areas in the 19th century. Some towns — such as Gabrovo, Tryavna, Karlovo, Koprivshtitsa, Lovech, Skopie — prospered. The Bulgarian peasants actually possessed their land, although it officially belonged to the sultan. The 19th century also brought improved communications, transportation and trade. The first factory in the Bulgarian lands opened in Sliven in 1834 and the first railway system started running (between Rousse and Varna) in 1865.

Bulgarian nationalism was emergent in the early 19th century under the influence of western ideas such as liberalism and nationalism, which trickled into the country after the French Revolution, mostly via Greece. The Greek revolt against the Ottomans which began in 1821 also influenced the small Bulgarian educated class. But Greek influence was limited by the general Bulgarian resentment of Greek control of the Bulgarian Church and it was the struggle to revive an independent Bulgarian Church which first roused Bulgarian nationalist sentiment.

In 1870, a Bulgarian Exarchate was created by a firman and the first Bulgarian Exarch, Antim I, became the natural leader of the emerging nation. The Constantinople Patriarch reacted by excommunicating the Bulgarian Exarchate, which reinforced their will for independence. A struggle for political liberation from the Ottoman Empire emerged in the face of the Bulgarian Revolutionary Central Committee and the Internal Revolutionary Organisation led by liberal revolutionaries such as Vasil Levski, Hristo Botev and Lyuben Karavelov.

=== April Uprising and Russo-Turkish War (1870s) ===
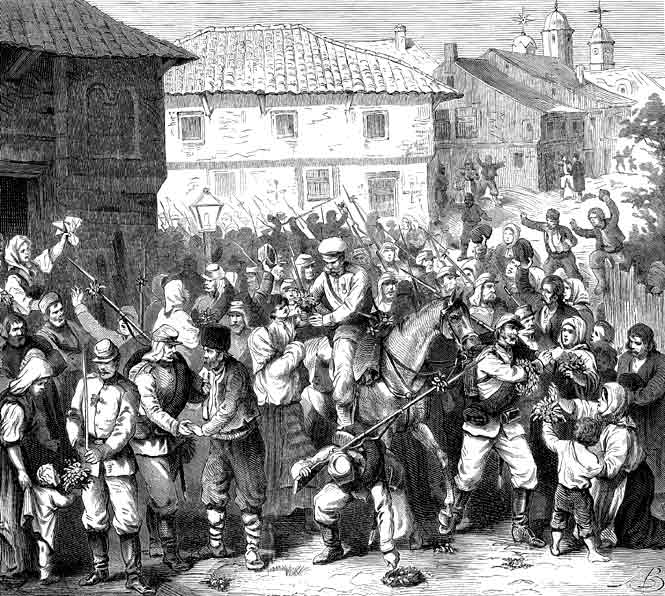
In 1877, Russian general Iosif Gurko liberated Veliko Tarnovo, ending the 480-year rule of the Ottoman Empire.

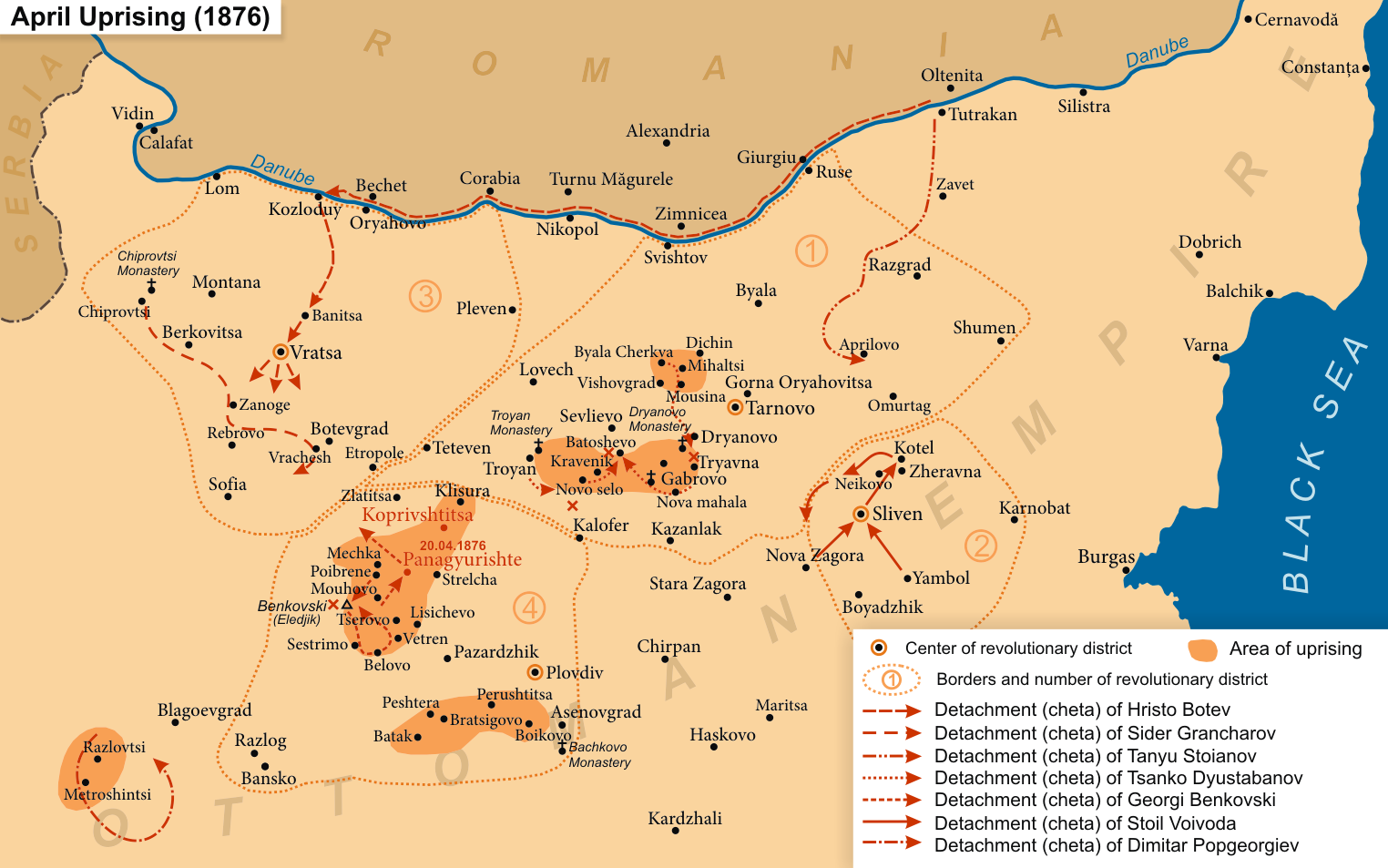
April Uprising

In April 1876, the Bulgarians revolted in the April Uprising. The revolt was poorly organized and started before the planned date. It was largely confined to the region of Plovdiv, though certain districts in northern Bulgaria, in Macedonia, and in the area of Sliven also took part. The uprising was crushed by the Ottomans, who brought in irregular troops (bashi-bazouks) from outside the area. Countless villages were pillaged and tens of thousands of people were massacred, the majority of them in the insurgent towns of Batak, Perushtitsa, and Bratsigovo, all in the area of Plovdiv.

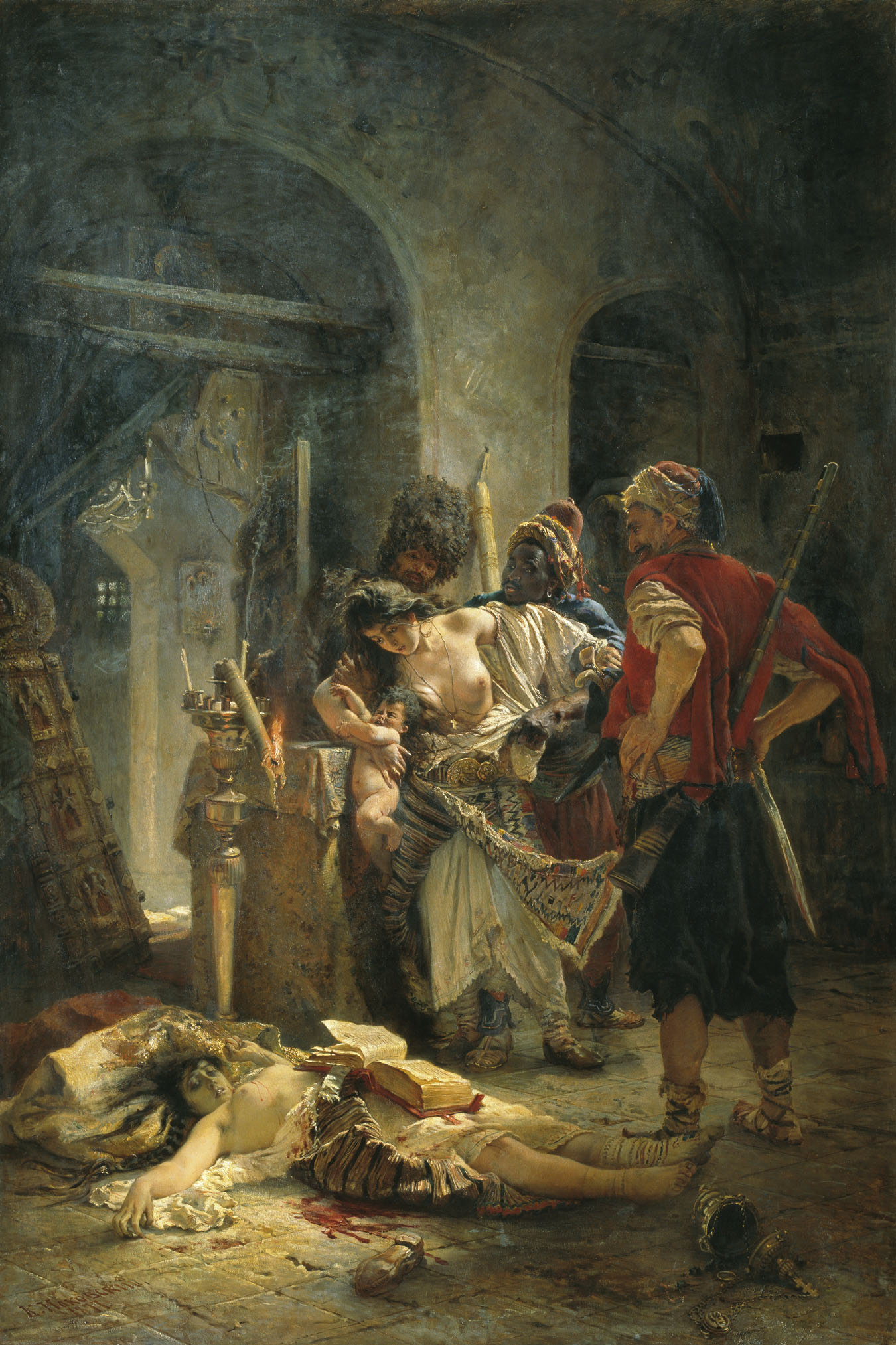
The Bulgarian Martyresses by Konstantin Makovsky, 1877

The massacres aroused a broad public reaction among liberal Europeans such as William Ewart Gladstone, who launched a campaign against the "Bulgarian Horrors". The campaign was supported by many European intellectuals and public figures. The strongest reaction, however, came from Russia. The enormous public outcry which the April Uprising had caused in Europe led to the Constantinople Conference of the Great Powers in 1876–77.

Turkey's refusal to implement the decisions of the conference gave Russia a long-waited chance to realise her long-term objectives with regard to the Ottoman Empire. Having its reputation at stake, Russia declared war on the Ottomans in April 1877. The Bulgarians also fought alongside the advancing Russians. Russia established a provisional government in Bulgaria. The Russian army and the Bulgarian Opalchentsi decisively defeated the Ottomans at Shipka Pass and Pleven. By January 1878 they had liberated much of the Bulgarian lands. (See Russo-Turkish War (1877–1878).)

== Third Bulgarian State (1878–1946) ==
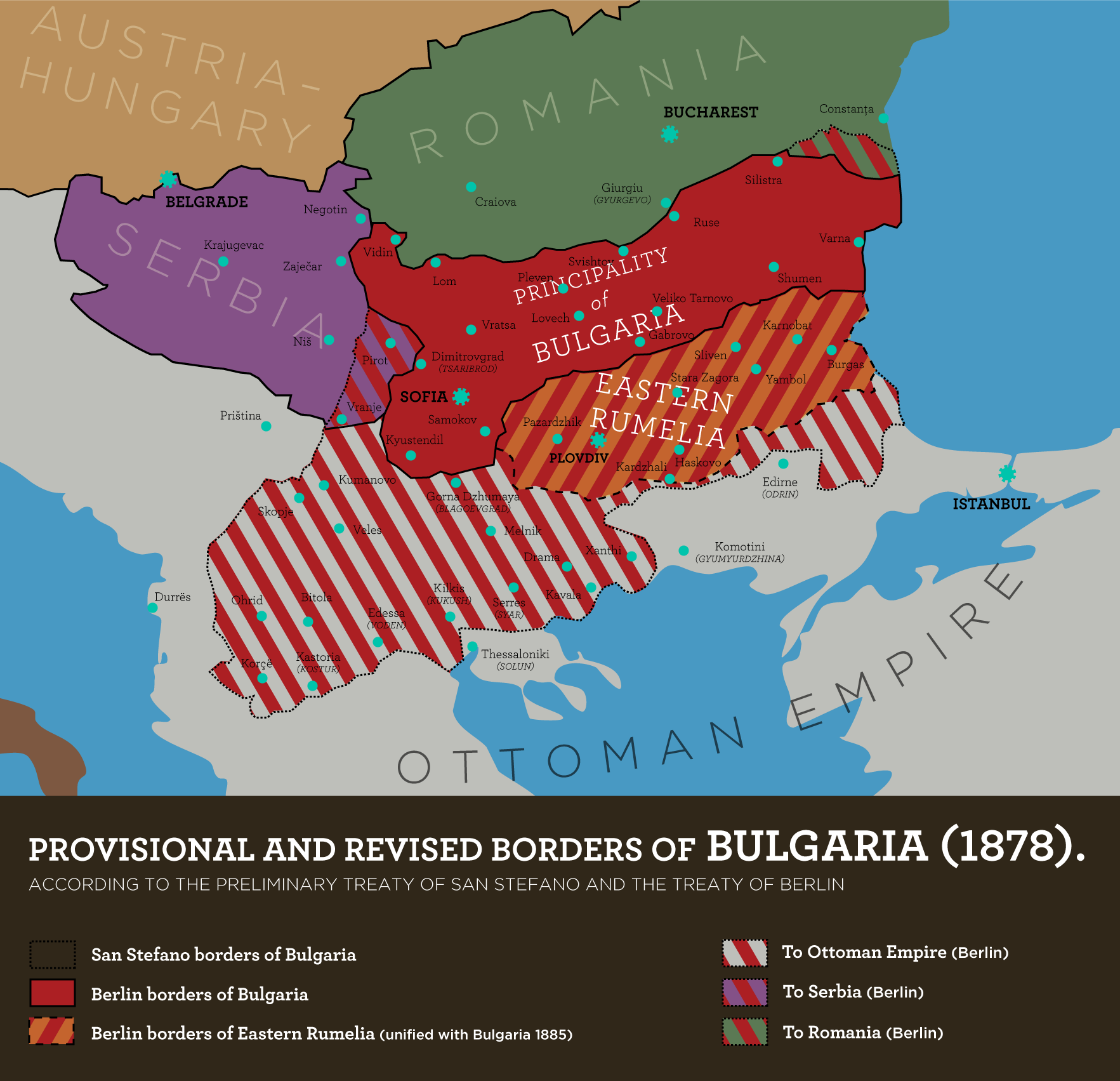
The borders of Bulgaria according to the Preliminary Treaty of San Stefano and the subsequent Treaty of Berlin (1878)

The Treaty of San Stefano was signed on 3 March 1878 and set up an autonomous Bulgarian principality on the territories of the Second Bulgarian Empire, including the regions of Moesia, Thrace and Macedonia, though the state was de jure only autonomous but de facto functioned independently. However, trying to preserve the balance of power in Europe and fearing the establishment of a large Russian client state in the Balkans, the other Great Powers were reluctant to agree to the treaty.

As a result, the Treaty of Berlin (1878), under the supervision of Otto von Bismarck of Germany and Benjamin Disraeli of Britain, revised the earlier treaty, and scaled back the proposed Bulgarian state. The new territory of Bulgaria was limited between the Danube and the Stara Planina range, with its seat at the old Bulgarian capital of Veliko Turnovo and including Sofia. This revision left large populations of ethnic Bulgarians outside the new country and defined Bulgaria's militaristic approach to foreign affairs and its participation in four wars during the first half of the 20th century.

Alexander of Battenberg, a German with close ties to the Russian Tsar, was the first prince (knyaz) of modern Bulgaria from 1879. Everyone had assumed Bulgaria would become a Russian ally. To the contrary, it became a bulwark against Russian expansion, and cooperated with the British. Bulgaria was attacked by Serbia in 1885, but defeated the invaders. It thereby gained respect from the great powers and defied Russia. In response Russia secured the abdication of Prince Alexander in 1886.

Stefan Stambolov (1854–1895) served 1886-1894 first as regent and then prime minister for the new ruler, Ferdinand I of Bulgaria (prince 1887–1908, tsar 1908–1918). Stambolov believed that Russia's liberation of Bulgaria from Turkish rule had been an attempt by Czarist Russia to turn Bulgaria into its protectorate. His policy was characterized by the goal of preserving Bulgarian independence at all costs, working with both the Liberal majority and Conservative minority parties. During his leadership Bulgaria was transformed from an Ottoman province into a modern European state. Stambolov launched a new course in Bulgarian foreign policy, independent of the interests of any great power. His main foreign policy objective was the unification of the Bulgarian nation into a nation-state consisting of all the territories of the Bulgarian Exarchate granted by the Sultan in 1870. Stambolov established close connections with the Sultan in order to enliven Bulgarian national spirit in Macedonia and to oppose Russian-backed Greek and Serbian propaganda. As a result of Stambolov's tactics, the Sultan recognised Bulgarians as the predominant people in Macedonia and gave a green light to the creation of a strong church and cultural institutions. Stambolov negotiated loans with western European countries to develop the economic and military strength of Bulgaria. In part, this was motivated by his desire to create a modern army which could secure all of the national territory. His approach toward western Europe was one of diplomatic manoeuvring. He understood the interests of the Austrian Empire in Macedonia and warned his diplomats accordingly. His domestic policy was distinguished by the defeat of terrorist groups sponsored by Russia, the strengthening of the rule of law, and rapid economic and educational growth, leading to progressive social and cultural change, and development of a modern army capable of protecting Bulgaria's independence. Stambolov was aware that Bulgaria had to be politically, militarily, and economically strong to achieve national unification. He mapped out the political course which turned Bulgaria into a strong regional power, respected by the great powers of the day. However, Bulgaria's regional leadership was short-lived. After Stambolov's death the independent course of his policy was abandoned.

Bulgaria emerged from Turkish rule as a poor, underdeveloped agricultural country, with little industry or tapped natural resources. Most of the land was owned by small farmers, with peasants comprising 80% of the population of 3.8 million in 1900. Agrarianism was the dominant political philosophy in the countryside, as the peasantry organized a movement independent of any existing party. In 1899, the Bulgarian Agrarian Union was formed, bringing together rural intellectuals such as teachers with ambitious peasants. It promoted modern farming practices, as well as elementary education.

The government promoted modernization, with special emphasis on building a network of elementary and secondary schools. By 1910, there were 4,800 elementary schools, 330 lyceums, 27 post-secondary educational institutions, and 113 vocational schools. From 1878 to 1933, France funded numerous libraries, research institutes, and Catholic schools throughout Bulgaria. In 1888, a university was established. It was renamed the University of Sofia in 1904, where the three faculties of history and philology, physics and mathematics, and law produced civil servants for national and local government offices. It became the center of German and Russian intellectual, philosophical and theological influences.

The first decade of the century saw sustained prosperity, with steady urban growth. The capital of Sofia grew by a factor of 600% - from 20,000 population in 1878 to 120,000 in 1912, primarily from peasants who arrived from the villages to become laborers, tradesman and office seekers. Macedonians used Bulgaria as a base, beginning in 1894, to agitate for independence from the Ottoman Empire. They launched a poorly planned uprising in 1903 that was brutally suppressed, and led to tens of thousands of additional refugees pouring into Bulgaria.

=== The Balkan Wars ===
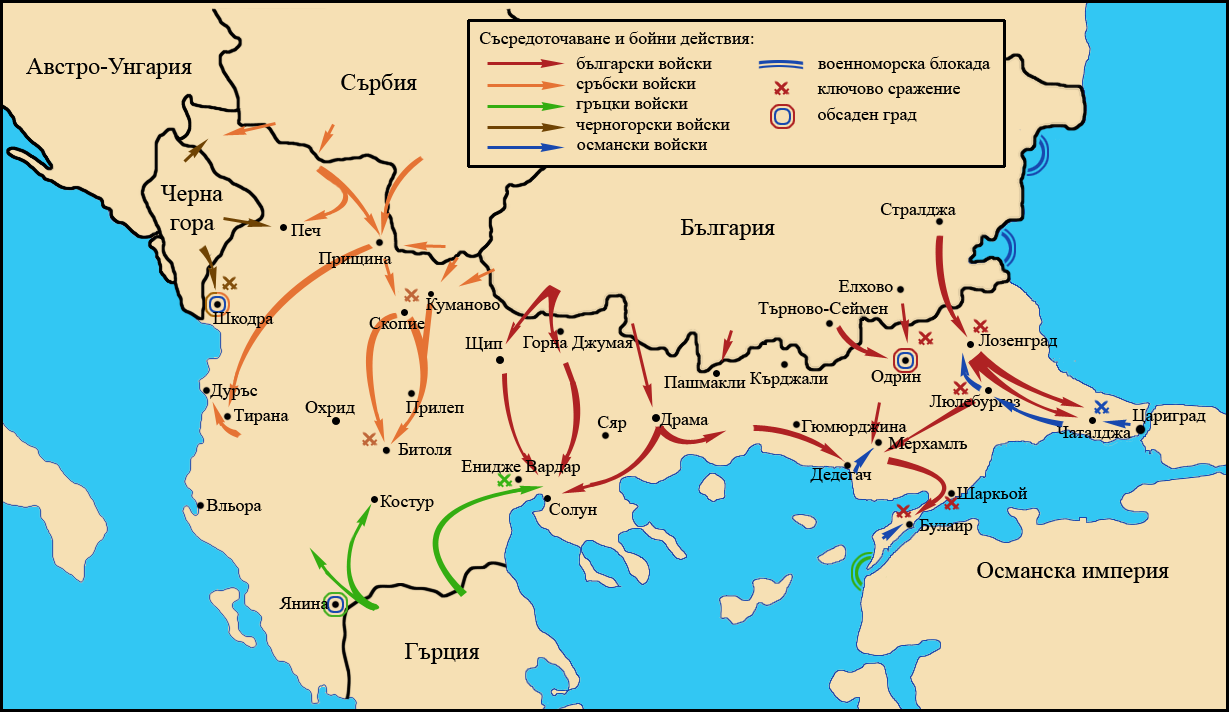
Map of Balkan League operations in 1912, Bulgarian forces in red

In the years following independence, Bulgaria became increasingly militarized and was often referred to as the "Prussia of the Balkans", with regard to its desire to revise the Treaty of Berlin through warfare. The partition of territories in the Balkans by the Great Powers without regard to ethnic composition led to a wave of discontent not only in Bulgaria, but also in its neighbouring countries. In 1911, Nationalist Prime Minister Ivan Geshov formed an alliance with Greece and Serbia to jointly attack the Ottomans and revise the existing agreements around ethnic lines.

In February 1912 a secret treaty was signed between Bulgaria and Serbia and in May 1912 a similar agreement was sealed with Greece. Montenegro was also brought into the pact. The treaties provided for the partition of the regions of Macedonia and Thrace between the allies, although the lines of partition were left dangerously vague. After the Ottoman Empire refused to implement reforms in the disputed areas, the First Balkan War broke out in October 1912 at a time when the Ottomans were tied down in a major war with Italy in Libya. The allies easily defeated the Ottomans and seized most of its European territory.

Bulgaria sustained the heaviest casualties of any of the allies while also making the largest territorial claims. The Serbs in particular did not agree and refused to vacate any of the territory they had seized in northern Macedonia (that is, the territory roughly corresponding to the modern Republic of North Macedonia), saying that the Bulgarian army had failed to accomplish its pre-war goals at Adrianople (to capture it without Serbian help) and that the pre-war agreement on the division of Macedonia had to be revised. Some circles in Bulgaria inclined toward going to war with Serbia and Greece on this issue.

In June 1913, Serbia and Greece formed a new alliance against Bulgaria. The Serbian Prime Minister Nikola Pasic promised Greece Thrace to Greece if it helped Serbia defend the territory it had captured in Macedonia; the Greek Prime Minister Eleftherios Venizelos agreed. Seeing this as a violation of the pre-war agreements, and privately encouraged by Germany and Austria-Hungary, Tsar Ferdinand declared war on Serbia and Greece on June 29.

The Serbian and Greek forces were initially beaten back from Bulgaria's western border, but they quickly gained the advantage and forced Bulgaria to retreat. The fighting was very harsh, with many casualties, especially during the key Battle of Bregalnitsa. Soon afterward, the Romania entered the war on the side of Greece and Serbia, attacking Bulgaria from the north. The Ottoman Empire saw this as an opportunity to regain its lost territories and also attacked from the south-east.

Facing war on three different fronts, Bulgaria sued for peace. It was forced to relinquish most of its territorial acquisitions in Macedonia to Serbia and Greece, Adrianapole to the Ottoman Empire, and the region of Southern Dobruja to Romania. The two Balkan wars greatly destabilized Bulgaria, stopping its hitherto steady economic growth, and leaving 58,000 dead and over 100,000 wounded. The bitterness at the perceived betrayal of its former allies empowered political movements who demanded the restoration of Macedonia to Bulgaria.

=== World War I ===
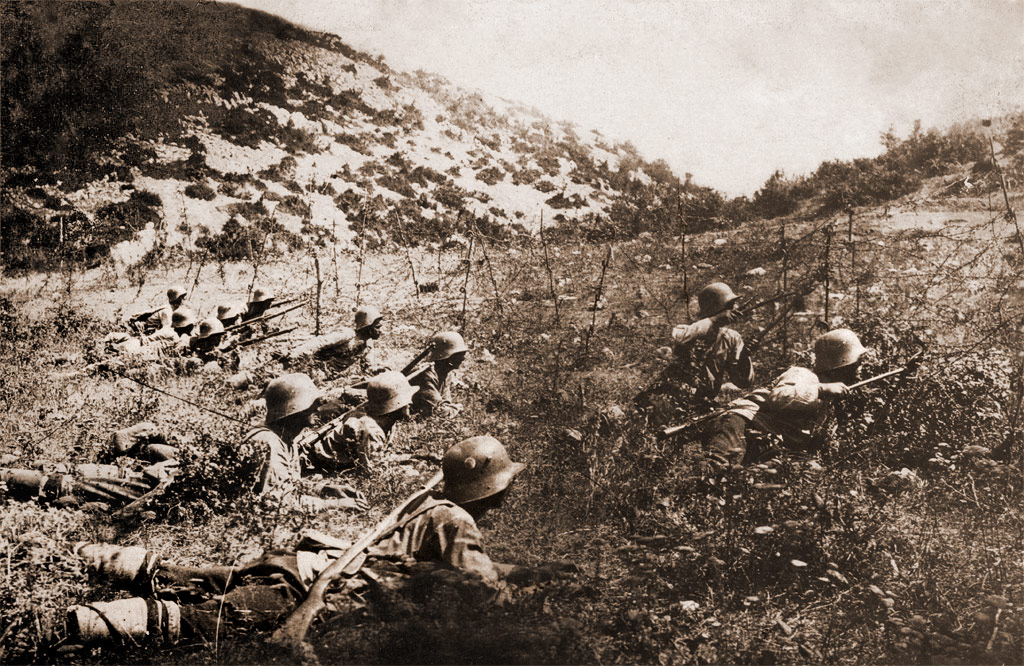
Bulgarian soldiers cutting enemy barbed wire and preparing to advance, probably 1917

In the aftermath of the Balkan Wars Bulgarian opinion turned against Russia and the Western powers, by whom the Bulgarians felt betrayed. The government of Vasil Radoslavov aligned Bulgaria with the German Empire and Austria-Hungary, even though this meant becoming an ally of the Ottomans, Bulgaria's traditional enemy. But Bulgaria now had no claims against the Ottomans, whereas Serbia, Greece and Romania (allies of Britain and France) held lands perceived in Bulgaria as Bulgarian.

Bulgaria sat out the first year of World War I recuperating from the Balkan Wars. Germany and Austria realized they needed Bulgaria's help in order to defeat Serbia militarily thereby opening supply lines from Germany to Turkey and bolstering the Eastern Front against Russia. Bulgaria insisted on major territorial gains, especially Macedonia, which Austria was reluctant to grant until Berlin insisted. Bulgaria also negotiated with the Allies, who offered somewhat less generous terms. The Tsar decided to go with Germany and Austria and signed an alliance with them in September 1915, along with a special Bulgarian-Turkish arrangement. It envisioned that Bulgaria would dominate the Balkans after the war.

Bulgaria, which had the land force in the Balkans, declared war on Serbia in October 1915. Britain, France and Italy responded by declaring war on Bulgaria. In alliance with Germany, Austria-Hungary and the Ottomans, Bulgaria won military victories against Serbia and Romania, occupying much of Macedonia (taking Skopje in October), advancing into Greek Macedonia, and taking Dobruja from Romania in September 1916. Thus Serbia was temporarily knocked out of the war, and Turkey was temporarily rescued from collapse. By 1917, Bulgaria fielded more than a quarter of its 4.5 million population in a 1,200,000-strong army, and inflicted heavy losses on Serbia (Kaymakchalan), Great Britain (Doiran), France (Monastir), the Russian Empire (Dobrich) and the Kingdom of Romania (Tutrakan).

However, the war soon became unpopular with most Bulgarians, who suffered great economic hardship and also disliked fighting their fellow Orthodox Christians in alliance with the Muslim Ottomans. The Agrarian Party leader Aleksandur Stamboliyski was imprisoned in 1915 for his opposition to the war. The Russian Revolution of February 1917 had a great effect in Bulgaria, spreading anti-war and anti-monarchist sentiment among the troops and in the cities. In June Radoslavov's government resigned. Mutinies broke out in the army, Stamboliyski was released and a republic was proclaimed.

=== Interwar years ===
In September 1918, Tsar Ferdinand abdicated in favour of his son Boris III in order to head off anti-monarchic revolutionary tendencies. Under the Treaty of Neuilly (November 1919) Bulgaria ceded its Aegean coastline to Greece, recognized the existence of Yugoslavia, ceded nearly all of its Macedonian territory to the Kingdom of Serbs, Croats and Slovenes, and had to give Dobruja back to Romania. The country had to reduce its army to no more than 22,000 men and pay reparations exceeding $400 million. Bulgarians generally refer to the results of the treaty as the "Second National Catastrophe."

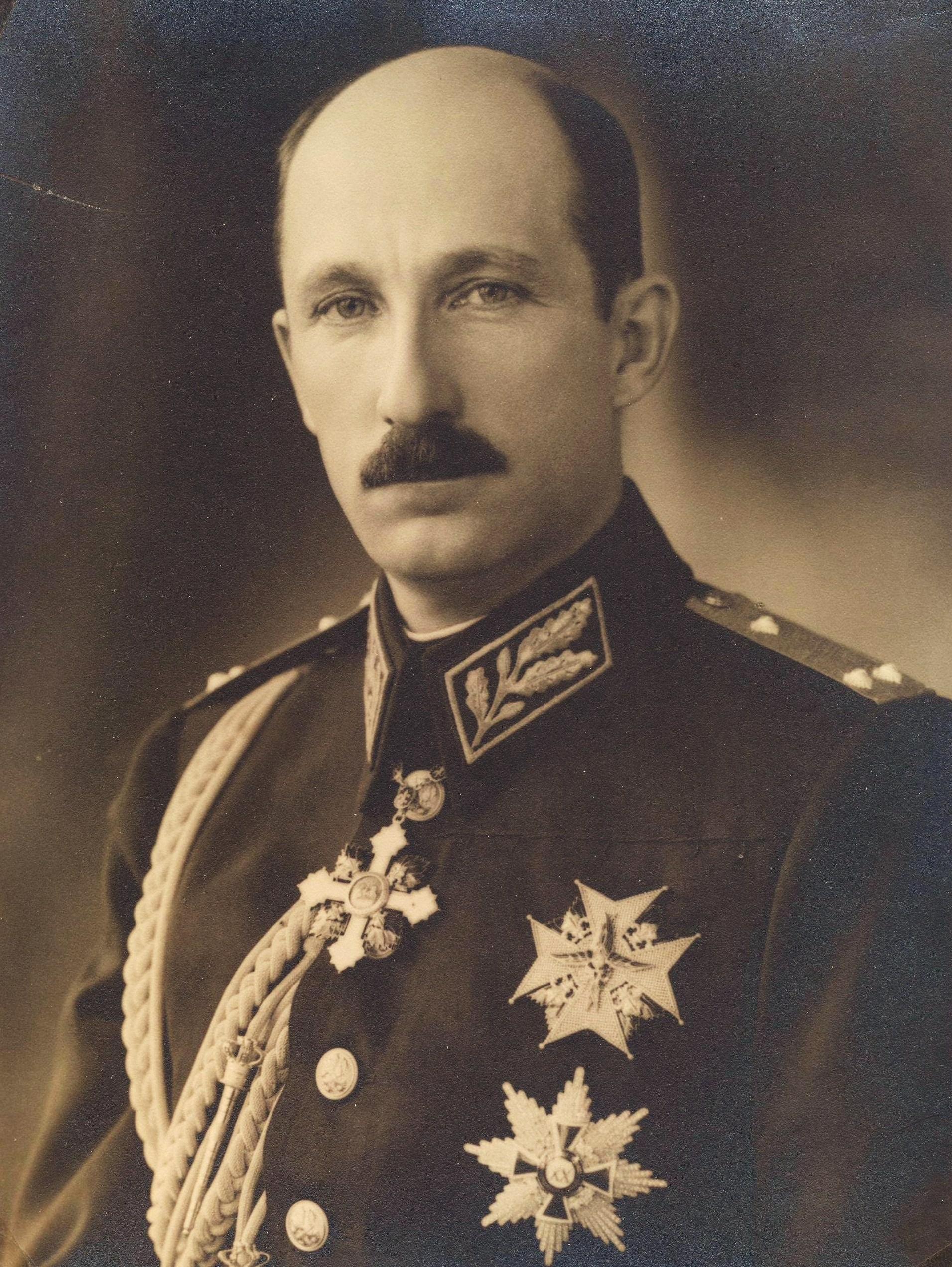
Tsar Boris III

Elections in March 1920 gave the Agrarians a large majority and Aleksandar Stamboliyski formed Bulgaria's first peasant government. He faced huge social problems, but succeeded in carrying out many reforms, although opposition from the middle and upper classes, the landlords and officers of the army remained powerful. In March 1923, Stamboliyski signed an agreement with the Kingdom of Yugoslavia recognising the new border and agreeing to suppress Internal Macedonian Revolutionary Organization (VMRO), which favoured a war to regain Macedonia from Yugoslavia.

This triggered a nationalist reaction and the coup d'état of 9 June 1923 eventually resulted in Stamboliykski's assassination. An extreme right-wing government under Aleksandar Tsankov took power, backed by the army and VMRO, which waged a White terror against Agrarians and Communists. In 1926, after the brief Incident at Petrich, the Tsar persuaded Tsankov to resign, a more moderate government under Andrey Lyapchev took office and an amnesty was proclaimed, although the Communists remained banned. A popular alliance, including the re-organised Agrarians, won the elections of 1931 under the name "Popular Bloc".

In May 1934 another coup took place, removing the Popular Bloc from power and establishing an authoritarian military régime headed by Kimon Georgiev. A year later, Tsar Boris managed to remove the military régime from power, restoring a form of parliamentary rule (without the re-establishment of the political parties) and under his own strict control. The Tsar's regime proclaimed neutrality, but gradually Bulgaria gravitated into alliance with Nazi Germany and Fascist Italy.

=== World War II ===
Upon the outbreak of World War II, the government of the Kingdom of Bulgaria under Bogdan Filov declared a position of neutrality, being determined to observe it until the end of the war, but hoping for bloodless territorial gains, especially in the lands with a significant Bulgarian population occupied by neighbouring countries after the Second Balkan War and World War I. But it was clear that the central geopolitical position of Bulgaria in the Balkans would inevitably lead to strong external pressure by both sides of World War II. Turkey had a non-aggression pact with Bulgaria.

Bulgaria succeeded in negotiating a recovery of Southern Dobruja, part of Romania since 1913, in the Axis-sponsored Treaty of Craiova on 7 September 1940, which reinforced Bulgarian hopes for solving territorial problems without direct involvement in the war. However, Bulgaria was forced to join the Axis powers in 1941, when German troops that were preparing to invade Greece from Romania reached the Bulgarian borders and demanded permission to pass through Bulgarian territory. Threatened by direct military confrontation, Tsar Boris III had no choice but to join the fascist bloc, which was made official on 1 March 1941. There was little popular opposition, since the Soviet Union was in a non-aggression pact with Germany. However the king refused to hand over the Bulgarian Jews to the Nazis, saving 50,000 lives. Bulgaria sent occupation forces into eastern Serbia, Macedonia and northern Greece (territories it claimed as its own), where atrocities were committed and local Jews were sent to death camps. A resistance movement organised to fight against the Wehrmacht forces in Bulgaria and the Tsardom of Bulgaria authorities. It was mainly communist and pro-Soviet Union.

Bulgarian troops marching at a victory parade in Sofia celebrating the end of World War II, 1945

Bulgaria did not join the German invasion of the Soviet Union that began on 22 June 1941 nor did it declare war on the Soviet Union. However, despite the lack of official declarations of war by both sides, the Bulgarian Navy was involved in a number of skirmishes with the Soviet Black Sea Fleet, which attacked Bulgarian shipping. Besides this, Bulgarian armed forces garrisoned in the Balkans battled various resistance groups. The Bulgarian government was forced by Germany to declare a token war on the United Kingdom and the United States on 13 December 1941, an act which resulted in the bombing of Sofia and other Bulgarian cities by Allied aircraft.

On 23 August 1944, Romania left the Axis Powers and declared war on Germany, and allowed Soviet forces to cross its territory to reach Bulgaria. On 5 September 1944 the Soviet Union declared war on Bulgaria and invaded. Within three days, the Soviets occupied the northeastern part of Bulgaria along with the key port cities of Varna and Burgas. Meanwhile, on 5 of September, Bulgaria declared war on Nazi Germany. The Bulgarian Army was ordered to offer no resistance.

On 9 September 1944 in a coup the government of Prime Minister Konstantin Muraviev was overthrown and replaced with a government of the Fatherland Front led by Kimon Georgiev. On 16 September 1944 the Soviet Red Army entered Sofia. In October 1944, mobilisation was ordered and Bulgaria sent three armies to fight under the operational command of the Red Army's 3rd Ukrainian Front to repel the Wehrmacht across Central Europe. The Bulgarian Army marked several victories against the 7th SS Volunteer Mountain Division Prinz Eugen (at Nish), the 22nd Infantry Division (at Strumica) and other German forces during the operations in Kosovo and at Stratsin. The Soviet army withdraws from Bulgaria after one year.

== People's Republic of Bulgaria (1946–1991) ==
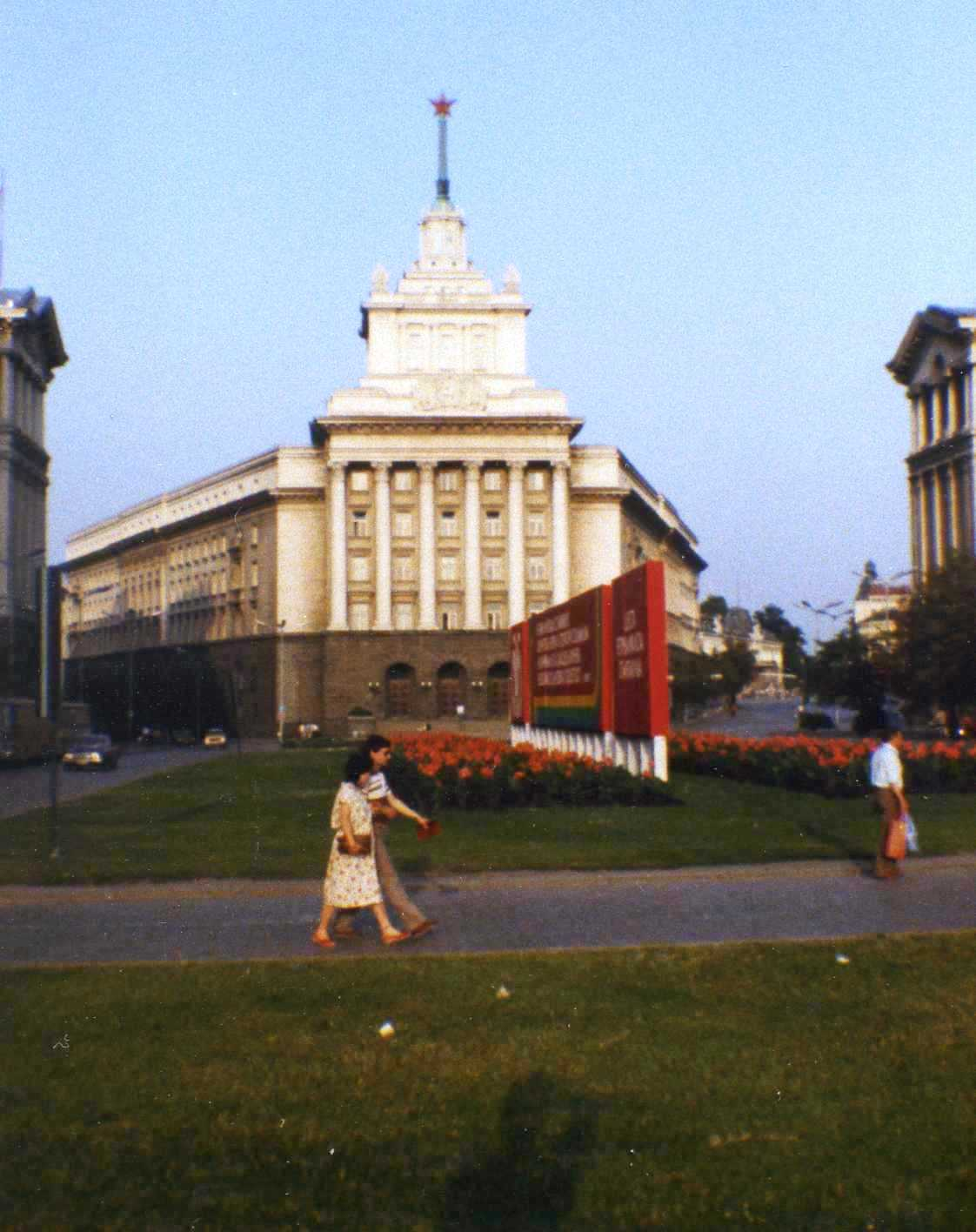
Headquarters of the Bulgarian Communist party in 1984

From 1946 to 1991 the country was known as the People's Republic of Bulgaria (PRB) and was ruled by the Bulgarian Communist Party (BCP), which underwent a transformation and changed its name to "Bulgarian Socialist Party" in 1990.

Communist leader Georgi Dimitrov had been in exile, mostly in the Soviet Union, since 1923. Although Stalin executed many other exiles, he was close to Dimitrov and thus appointed him to high positions. After Dimitrov was arrested in Berlin, he showed great courage during the Reichstag fire trial of 1933, which led to Stalin naming him head of the Comintern during the Popular Front period.

After 1944 Dimitrov also became close with the Yugoslav Communist leader Josip Broz Tito, and believed that Yugoslavia and Bulgaria, as closely related South Slav peoples, should form a federation. This idea was not favoured by Stalin. There have long been suspicions that Dimitrov's sudden death in Moscow in July 1949 was not accidental, but this has never been proven. Dimitrov's death coincided with Stalin's expulsion of Tito from the Cominform, and was followed by a "Titoist" witch hunt in Bulgaria. The witch hunt culminated in the show trial and execution of Deputy Prime Minister Traicho Kostov (died 16 December 1949). Once the elderly Prime Minister Vasil Kolarov (born 1877) died in January 1950, this seat was passed on to a Stalinist, Vulko Chervenkov (1900–1980).

Bulgaria's Stalinist phase lasted less than five years. Under Chervenkov's leadership, agriculture was collectivised and a massive industrialisation campaign was launched. Bulgaria also adopted a centrally planned economy, similar to those in other COMECON states; when collectivisation began in the mid-1940s, Bulgaria was a primarily agrarian state, with about 80% of its population located in rural areas. Although he broke off diplomatic relations with the U.S. in 1950, Chervenkov's support base in the Communist Party was too narrow for him to last long once Stalin, his patron, was no longer in charge. After Stalin's death in March 1953, Chervenkov was deposed as Party Secretary in March 1954 with the approval of the new leadership in Moscow, and Todor Zhivkov took his place. Chervenkov remained prime minister until April 1955, when he was dismissed and replaced by Anton Yugov.

By the mid-1950s, living standards rose significantly, and in 1957 collective farm workers benefited from the first agricultural pension and welfare system in Eastern Europe. Bulgaria underwent rapid industrial development from the 1950s onwards. Starting with the 1960s, the country's economy appeared profoundly transformed. Despite the achievements of this modernisation, many difficulties remained, such as poor housing and inadequate urban infrastructure. During this period, Zhivkov initiated various reforms and passed a few experimental market-oriented policies. The country's production eventually turned to high technology, a sector which represented 14% of its GDP between 1985 and 1990. It hosted the factory production of processors, hard disks, floppy disk drives and industrial robots.

Lyudmila Zhivkova, politician and daughter of Todor Zhivkov, worked to promote Bulgaria's national heritage, culture and arts on a global scale. An assimilation campaign of the late 1980s directed against ethnic Turks resulted in the emigration of some 300,000 Bulgarian Turks to Turkey, which caused a significant drop in agricultural production due to the loss of labor force.

== Republic of Bulgaria (since 1989) ==
By the time the impact of Mikhail Gorbachev's reform program in the Soviet Union was felt in Bulgaria in the late 1980s, the Bulgarian Communist Party (BCP) had grown too weak to resist the demand for change. In November 1989 Sofia saw demonstrations relating to ecological issues, and these soon expanded into a broad campaign for political reform. The BCP reacted by deposing Zhivkov and replacing him with Petar Mladenov, which resulted in only a short period of peace.

In February 1990 the BCP voluntarily gave up its monopoly on power, and in June the country held its first free election since 1931. In this election the BCP retained its position as Bulgaria's leading party, though not without shedding its hard-line wing, and adopted the name Bulgarian Socialist Party (BSP). In July 1991 a new Constitution was adopted, in which the system of government was fixed as a parliamentary republic with a directly elected President, and a Prime Minister held accountable by the National Assembly.

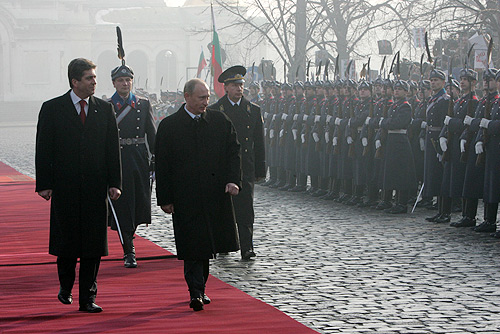
President Georgi Parvanov (left) with Russian president Vladimir Putin, 2008

Like other post-Communist regimes in Eastern Europe, Bulgaria found the transition to capitalism more troublesome than was expected. The anti-Communist Union of Democratic Forces (UDF) took office in the next election, and the Berov Government went through with the privatisation of land and industry between 1992 and 1994 through the issue of shares in government enterprises to all citizens. These were, however, accompanied by massive unemployment as uncompetitive industries failed and the backward state of Bulgaria's industry and infrastructure were revealed. BSP consequently campaigned on protecting the poor from the excesses of the free market.

Negative reactions to the economic reforms led to Zhan Videnov (BSP) taking the office of prime minister in 1995. By 1996 however the BSP government was also encountering difficulties, and UDF's Petar Stoyanov was elected president in the election held that year. In 1997 the BSP government collapsed and the UDF came to power. Unemployment, however, remained high and the electorate became increasingly dissatisfied with both parties.

On 17 June 2001, Simeon II, former child Tsar of Bulgaria (1943–1946) and son of Boris III, won a narrow victory in parliamentary elections. Simeon's party — National Movement Simeon II ("NMSII") — won 120 of the 240 seats in Parliament. Despite this, Simeon's popularity declined quickly during his four-year rule as prime minister, and the BSP gained his seat back in the 2005 parliamentary election. The BSP could not form a single-party government and had to seek a coalition. In the 2009 parliamentary election, Boyko Borisov's right-centrist party Citizens for European Development of Bulgaria won nearly 40% of the vote.

Since the introduction of multi-party elections in 1989 and the privatization of its economy, economic difficulties and widespread corruption led to the emigration of over 800,000 Bulgarians, including many qualified professionals. The reform package introduced in 1997 restored positive economic growth, but caused a rise in social inequality, failing to improve living standards. According to a 2009 Pew Global Attitudes Project survey, 76% of Bulgarians said they were dissatisfied with the democratic system, 63% thought that free markets did not make people better off and only 11% of Bulgarians agreed that ordinary people had benefited from the changes in 1989. Furthermore, the average quality of life and economic performance in the 2000s sunk lower than its level under socialism.

Bulgaria became a member of NATO on 29 March 2004 and of the European Union on 1 January 2007 (together with Romania). In 2010 it was ranked 32nd (between Greece and Lithuania) out of 181 countries in the Globalization Index. As of 2015, the freedom of speech and of the press are respected by the government, but many media outlets are beholden to major advertisers and owners with political agendas. Also see Human rights in Bulgaria. Polls carried out in 2014 (seven years after the country's accession to the EU) found only 15% of Bulgarians felt they had personally benefited from the membership.
From 1989 to the end of 2024, the European Union (EU) has accounted for about 90 percent of external financing in Bulgaria. Bulgaria has received (by conservative estimates) about 70 billion leva (~35 billion €), and by preliminary estimates for 2025 alone this is an additional six to seven billion leva. Over the last decade this has been about 3 percent of the average annual GDP (gross domestic product). Since Bulgaria's accession to the EU this funding have contributed about 7 percent of revenues in the consolidated budget.

Since 1 January 2026, the Euro is Bulgaria's currency. On May 16, 2026, Bulgaria won the 70th Eurovision competition.

== See also ==
- Timeline of Bulgarian history
- Hominid dispersals in Europe
- Cradle of civilization
- Neolithic Revolution
- Neolithic Europe
- Thracians
- Moesi
- Getae
- List of ancient Daco-Thracian peoples and tribes
- Dacians
- Paeonia (kingdom)
- Scythians
- Classical Antiquity
- Timeline of Varna
- Philippopolis (Thrace)
- Celtic settlement of Southeast Europe
- List of archaeological sites by country
- History of Sofia
- Edict of Serdica
- Ancient Roman architecture
- Early centers of Christianity
- List of oldest known surviving buildings
- List of oldest church buildings
- Fresco
- Migration Period
- Gothic Bible
- Bulgarian Empire
- Golden Age of medieval Bulgarian culture
- Early Cyrillic alphabet
- Balkan–Danubian culture
- Bulgarian–Latin wars
- Tsarevets (fortress)
- Architecture of the Tarnovo Artistic School
- Tarnovo Literary School
- Baba Vida
- Byzantine–Bulgarian wars
- National awakening of Bulgaria
- Bulgarian unification
- List of Bulgarian monarchs
- Medieval Bulgarian army
- Medieval Bulgarian navy
- Bulgarian lands across the Danube
- Bulgarian language
- Bulgarian dialects
- List of predecessors of sovereign states in Europe
- List of sovereign states by date of formation § Europe
- List of empires
- List of medieval great powers
- List of oldest continuously inhabited cities
- History of the Balkans
- History of the Mediterranean region
- History of Europe
- History of the European Union

== Bibliography ==
=== Surveys ===
- Chary, Frederick B. "Bulgaria (History)" in Richard Frucht, ed. Encyclopedia of Eastern Europe (Garland, 2000) pp 91–113.
- Chary, Frederick B. The History of Bulgaria (The Greenwood Histories of the Modern Nations) (2011) excerpt and text search; complete text
- Crampton, R.J. Bulgaria (Oxford History of Modern Europe) (1990) excerpt and text search; also complete text online
  - Crampton, R.J. A Concise History of Bulgaria (2005) excerpt and text search
- Detrez, Raymond. Historical Dictionary of Bulgaria (2nd ed. 2006). lxiv + 638 pp. Maps, bibliography, appendix, chronology. ISBN 978-0-8108-4901-3.
- Hristov, Hristo. History of Bulgaria [translated from the Bulgarian, Stefan Kostov; editor, Dimiter Markovski]. Khristov, Khristo Angelov. 1985.
- Jelavich, Barbara. History of the Balkans (1983)
- Kossev, D., H. Hristov and D. Angelov; Short history of Bulgaria (1963).
- Lampe, John R, and Marvin R. Jackson. Balkan Economic History, 1550–1950: From Imperial Borderlands to Developing Nations. 1982. online edition
- Lampe, John R. The Bulgarian Economy in the 20th century. 1986.
- MacDermott, Mercia; A History of Bulgaria, 1393–1885 (1962) online edition
- Todorov, Nikolai. Short history of Bulgaria (1921)
- Shared Pasts in Central and Southeast Europe, 17th-21st Centuries. Eds. G.Demeter, P. Peykovska. 2015

=== Pre 1939 ===
- Black, Cyril E. The Establishment of Constitutional Government in Bulgaria (Princeton University Press, 1943)
- Constant, Stephen. Foxy Ferdinand, 1861–1948: Tsar of Bulgaria (1979)
- Forbes, Nevill. Balkans: A history of Bulgaria, Serbia, Greece, Rumania, Turkey 1915.
- Hall, Richard C. Bulgaria's Road to the First World War. Columbia University Press, 1996.
- Hall, Richard C. War in the Balkans: An Encyclopedic History from the Fall of the Ottoman Empire to the Breakup of Yugoslavia (2014) excerpt
- Jelavich, Charles, and Barbara Jelavich. The Establishment of the Balkan National States, 1804–1920 (1977)
- Perry, Duncan M. (1993). Stefan Stambolov and the Emergence of Modern Bulgaria, 1870–1895. Archived from the original on July 21, 2012 – via Questia.
- Pundeff, Marin. "Bulgaria," in Joseph Held, ed. The Columbia History of Eastern Europe in the 20th Century (Columbia University Press, 1992) pp 65–118
- Runciman, Steven. A History of the First Bulgarian Empire (1930) online edition
- Stavrianos, L.S. The Balkans Since 1453 (1958), major scholarly history; online free to borrow

=== 1939–1989 ===
- Michael Bar-Zohar. Beyond Hitler's Grasp: The Heroic Rescue of Bulgaria's Jews (1998)
- Alexenia Dimitrova. The Iron Fist: Inside the Archives of the Bulgarian Secret Police (2007)
- Stephane Groueff. Crown of Thorns: The Reign of King Boris III of Bulgaria, 1918–1943 (1987)
- Pundeff, Marin. "Bulgaria," in Joseph Held, ed. The Columbia History of Eastern Europe in the 20th Century (Columbia University Press, 1992) pp 65–118
- Tzvetan Todorov The Fragility of Goodness: Why Bulgaria's Jews Survived the Holocaust (2001)
- Tzvetan Todorov. Voices from the Gulag: Life and Death in Communist Bulgaria (1999)

=== Contemporary ===
- John D. Bell, ed. Bulgaria in Transition: Politics, Economics, Society, and Culture after Communism (1998) online edition

=== Historiography ===
- Baeva, Iskra. "An Attempt to Revive Foreign Interest to Bulgarian History." Bulgarian Historical Review/Revue Bulgare d'Histoire 1-2 (2007): 266–268.
- Birman, Mikhail. "Bulgarian Jewry and the Holocaust: History and Historiography," Shvut 2001, Vol. 10, pp 160–181.
- Daskalova, Krassimira. "The politics of a discipline: women historians in twentieth century Bulgaria." Rivista internazionale di storia della storiografia 46 (2004): 171–187.
- Daskalov, Roumen. "The Social History of Bulgaria: Topics and Approaches," East Central Europe, (2007) 34#1-2 pp 83–103, abstract
- Daskalov, Roumen. Making of a Nation in the Balkans: Historiography of the Bulgarian Revival, (2004) 286pp.
- Davidova, Evguenia. "A Centre in the Periphery: Merchants during the Ottoman period in Modern Bulgarian Historiography (1890s-1990s)." Journal of European Economic History (2002) 31#3 pp 663–86.
- Grozdanova, Elena. "Bulgarian Ottoman Studies At The Turn Of Two Centuries: Continuity And Innovation," Etudes Balkaniques (2005) 41#3 PP 93–146. covers 1400 to 1922;
- Hacisalihoglu, Mehmet. "The Ottoman Administration of Bulgaria and Macedonia During the 19th - 20th Centuries in Recent Turkish Historiography: Contributions, Deficiencies and Perspectives." Turkish Review of Balkan Studies (2006), Issue 11, pP 85–123; covers 1800 to 1920.
- Meininger, Thomas A. "A Troubled Transition: Bulgarian Historiography, 1989–94," Contemporary European History, (1996) 5#1 pp 103–118
- Mosely, Philip E. "The Post-War Historiography of Modern Bulgaria," Journal of Modern History, (1937) 9#3 pp 348–366; work done in 1920s and 1930s in JSTOR
- Robarts, Andrew. "The Danube Vilayet And Bulgar-Turkish Compromise Proposal Of 1867 In Bulgarian Historiography," International Journal of Turkish Studies (2008) 14#1-2 pp 61–74.
- Todorova, Maria. "Historiography of the countries of Eastern Europe: Bulgaria," American Historical Review, (1992) 97#4 pp 1105–1117 in JSTOR

=== Other ===
- 12 Myths in Bulgarian History, by Bozhidar Dimitrov; Published by "KOM Foundation," Sofia, 2005.
- The 7th Ancient Civilizations in Bulgaria (The Golden Prehistoric Civilization, Civilization of Thracians and Macedonians, Hellenistic Civilization, Roman [Empire] Civilization, Byzantine [Empire] Civilization, Bulgarian Civilization, Islamic Civilization), by Bozhidar Dimitrov; Published by "KOM Foundation," Sofia, 2005 (108 p.)
- Evans, Stanley G. A Short History of Bulgaria (London: Lawrence & Wishart, 1960).
- Fine, John V. A. Jr. (1991) [1983]. The Early Medieval Balkans: A Critical Survey from the Sixth to the Late Twelfth Century. Ann Arbor: University of Michigan Press. ISBN 0-472-08149-7.
- Kazhdan, A. (1991). The Oxford Dictionary of Byzantium. New York, Oxford: Oxford University Press. ISBN 0-19-504652-8.
