= 2009 in Bulgaria =

- Decades: 1980s; 1990s; 2000s; 2010s; 2020s
- See also: Other events of 2009; Timeline of Bulgarian history

Events in the year 2009 in Bulgaria.

== Incumbents ==
- President: Georgi Parvanov
- Prime Minister: Sergei Stanishev (from 2005 until July 27) Boyko Borisov (from July 27 until 2013)

== Events ==
- 10 January – Russia's gas dispute with Ukraine cuts supplies to Bulgaria, resulting in a severe energy shortage lasting several weeks and widespread anger at the government's energy policies.

=== Undated ===
- Nimero, a Bulgarian software company is founded.
