= 2010 in Bulgaria =

- Decades: 1990s; 2000s; 2010s; 2020s
- See also: Other events of 2010; Timeline of Bulgarian history

Events in the year 2010 in Bulgaria.

== Incumbents ==
- President: Georgi Parvanov
- Prime Minister: Boyko Borisov
- Speaker: Tsetska Tsacheva

== Events ==
- 15 December – A government-appointed commission finds that 45 senior Bulgarian diplomats were secret service agents during the communist era. Boyko Borisov calls on the government to sack the diplomats.
