= 2012 in Bulgaria =

- Decades: 1990s; 2000s; 2010s; 2020s
- See also: Other events of 2012; Timeline of Bulgarian history

Events in the year 2012 in Bulgaria.

== Incumbents ==
- President: Rosen Plevneliev
- Prime Minister: Boyko Borisov

== Events ==
- May 22: A magnitude 5.6 earthquake struck 24 km west of Bulgaria's capital Sofia, at a depth of 9.4 km. A citizen died from heart attack, several buildings were damaged.
- July 18: An explosion has killed at least seven people on a bus carrying Israeli tourists in the eastern Bulgarian city of Burgas. More than 20 people were also injured when the bus exploded at Burgas airport, by the Black Sea.

== Deaths ==
- November 6: Maxim of Bulgaria, 98, patriarch of the Bulgarian Orthodox Church. (born 1914)
