= 2013 in Bulgaria =

- Decades: 1990s; 2000s; 2010s; 2020s
- See also: Other events of 2013; Timeline of Bulgarian history

Events in the year 2013 in Bulgaria.

== Incumbents ==
- President: Rosen Plevneliev
- Prime Minister: Boyko Borisov (from 2009 until 13 March), Marin Raykov (from 13 March to 29 May), Plamen Oresharski (from 29 May until 2014)

== Events ==
- 27 January – A controversial referendum on whether to build a second Bulgarian nuclear plant is invalidated by low turnout.
