= 2015 in Bulgaria =

- Decades: 1990s; 2000s; 2010s; 2020s
- See also: Other events of 2015; Timeline of Bulgarian history

Events in the year 2015 in Bulgaria.

== Incumbents ==
- President: Rosen Plevneliev
- Prime Minister: Boyko Borisov

== Events ==
- 14 January – The government says it will extend a controversial fence along its border with Turkey by 80 km to help stem the flow of illegal immigrants.

== Deaths ==
- December 5 - Dimitar Iliev Popov, prime minister (1990–1991)
