= 2014 in Bulgaria =

- Decades: 1990s; 2000s; 2010s; 2020s
- See also: Other events of 2014; Timeline of Bulgarian history

The following lists events that happened during 2014 in the Republic of Bulgaria.

== Incumbents ==
- President: Rosen Plevneliev
- Prime Minister:
  - until 6 August: Plamen Oresharski
  - 6 August-7 November: Georgi Bliznashki
  - starting 7 November: Boyko Borisov

== Events ==
=== April ===
- April 11 - Secretary General of NATO Anders Fogh Rasmussen visits Bulgaria and meets with President Rosen Plevneliev, during his visit he calls on Russia to withdraw their troops from the Ukrainian border.
