= 2011 in Bulgaria =

- Decades: 1990s; 2000s; 2010s; 2020s
- See also: Other events of 2011; Timeline of Bulgarian history

Events in the year 2011 in Bulgaria.

== Incumbents ==
- President: Georgi Parvanov
- Prime Minister: Boyko Borisov

== Events ==
- September 26: Two people are killed and six others injured in ethnic clashes in the Bulgarian city of Plovdiv.
- 2011 Bulgaria antiziganist protests The reason for the unrest was the murder of a local youth, who was run over by a car by the close associate of local Roma boss Kiril Rashkov.

== Deaths ==
- 1 April - Georgi Rusev, actor (b. 1928)
