= List of diplomatic missions of Bulgaria =

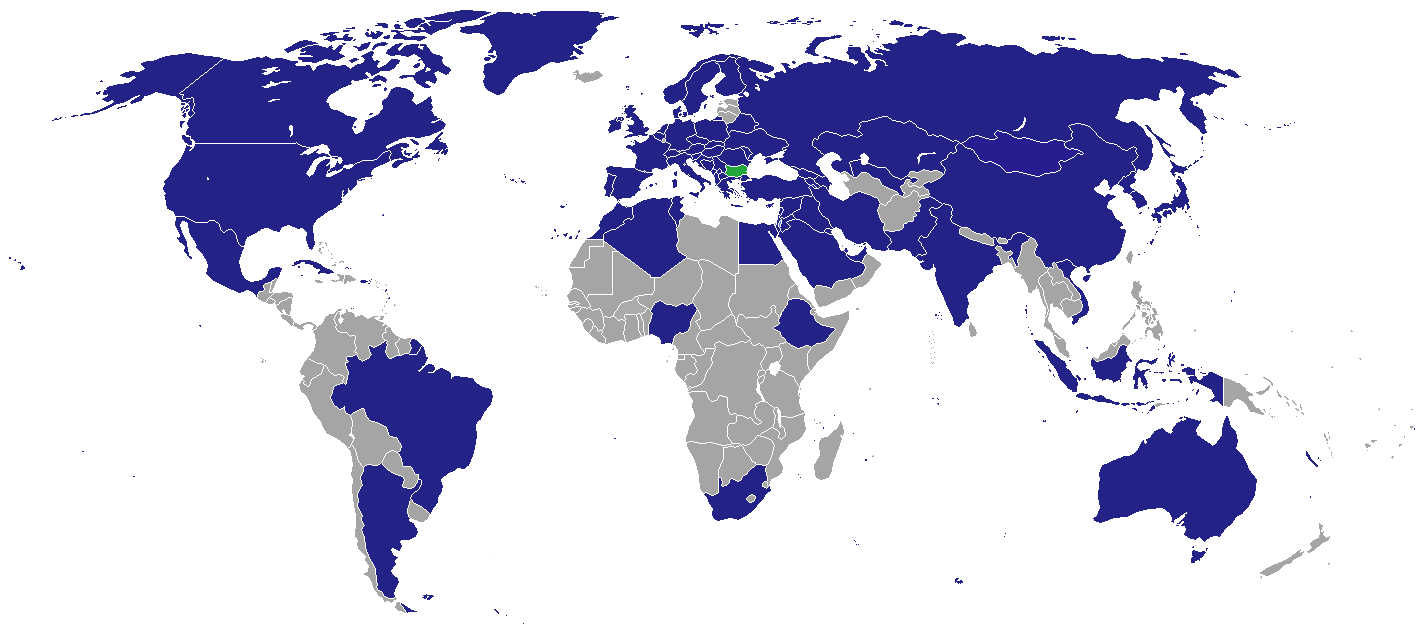
Diplomatic missions of Bulgaria

This is a list of diplomatic missions of Bulgaria, excluding honorary consulates.

== Current missions ==
=== Africa ===
Host country	Host city	Mission	Concurrent accreditation	Ref.
Algeria	Algiers	Embassy	Countries: Mali; Niger	
Egypt	Cairo	Embassy	Countries: Sudan	
Ethiopia	Addis Ababa	Embassy	Countries: Chad; Djibouti; Eritrea; Kenya; Seychelles; Somalia; South Sudan; Tanzania; Uganda	
Morocco	Rabat	Embassy	Countries: Senegal	
Nigeria	Abuja	Embassy	Countries: Benin; Burkina Faso; Burundi; Cameroon; Central African Republic; Republic of Congo; Democratic Republic of the Congo; Equatorial Guinea; Gabon; Gambia; Ghana; Guinea; Guinea Bissau; Ivory Coast; Liberia; Rwanda; São Tomé and Príncipe; Sierra Leone; Togo	
South Africa	Pretoria	Embassy	Countries: Angola; Botswana; Comoros; Eswatini; Lesotho; Madagascar; Malawi; Mauritius; Mozambique; Namibia; Zambia; Zimbabwe	
Tunisia	Tunis	Embassy	Countries: Libya; Mauritania	

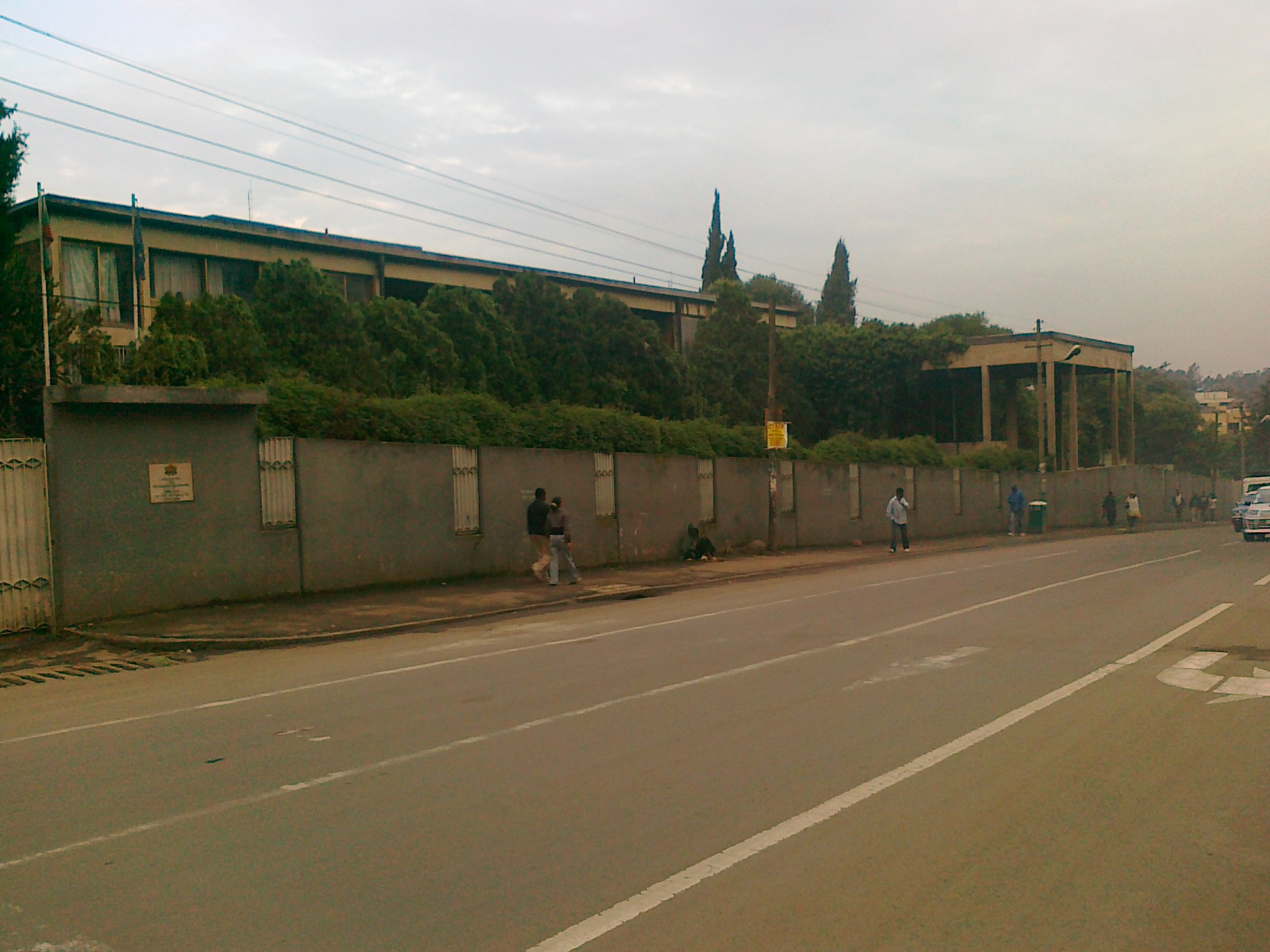
Embassy in Addis Ababa

=== Americas ===
Host country	Host city	Mission	Concurrent accreditation	Ref.
Argentina	Buenos Aires	Embassy	Countries: Bolivia; Chile; Paraguay; Uruguay	
Brazil	Brasília	Embassy	Countries: Colombia; Ecuador; Grenada; Guyana; Peru; Suriname; Venezuela	
Canada	Ottawa	Embassy		
Canada	Toronto	Consulate-General		
Cuba	Havana	Embassy	Countries: Antigua and Barbuda; Bahamas; Barbados; Dominica; Dominican Republic; Haiti; Jamaica; Trinidad and Tobago	
Mexico	Mexico City	Embassy	Countries: Belize; Costa Rica; El Salvador; Guatemala; Honduras; Nicaragua; Panama	
United States	Washington, D.C.	Embassy	Multilateral Organizations: Organization of American States (Note: Accredited as an observer mission.)	
United States	Chicago	Consulate-General	Multilateral Organizations: Organization of American States	
United States	Los Angeles	Consulate-General	Multilateral Organizations: Organization of American States	
United States	New York City	Consulate-General	Multilateral Organizations: Organization of American States	

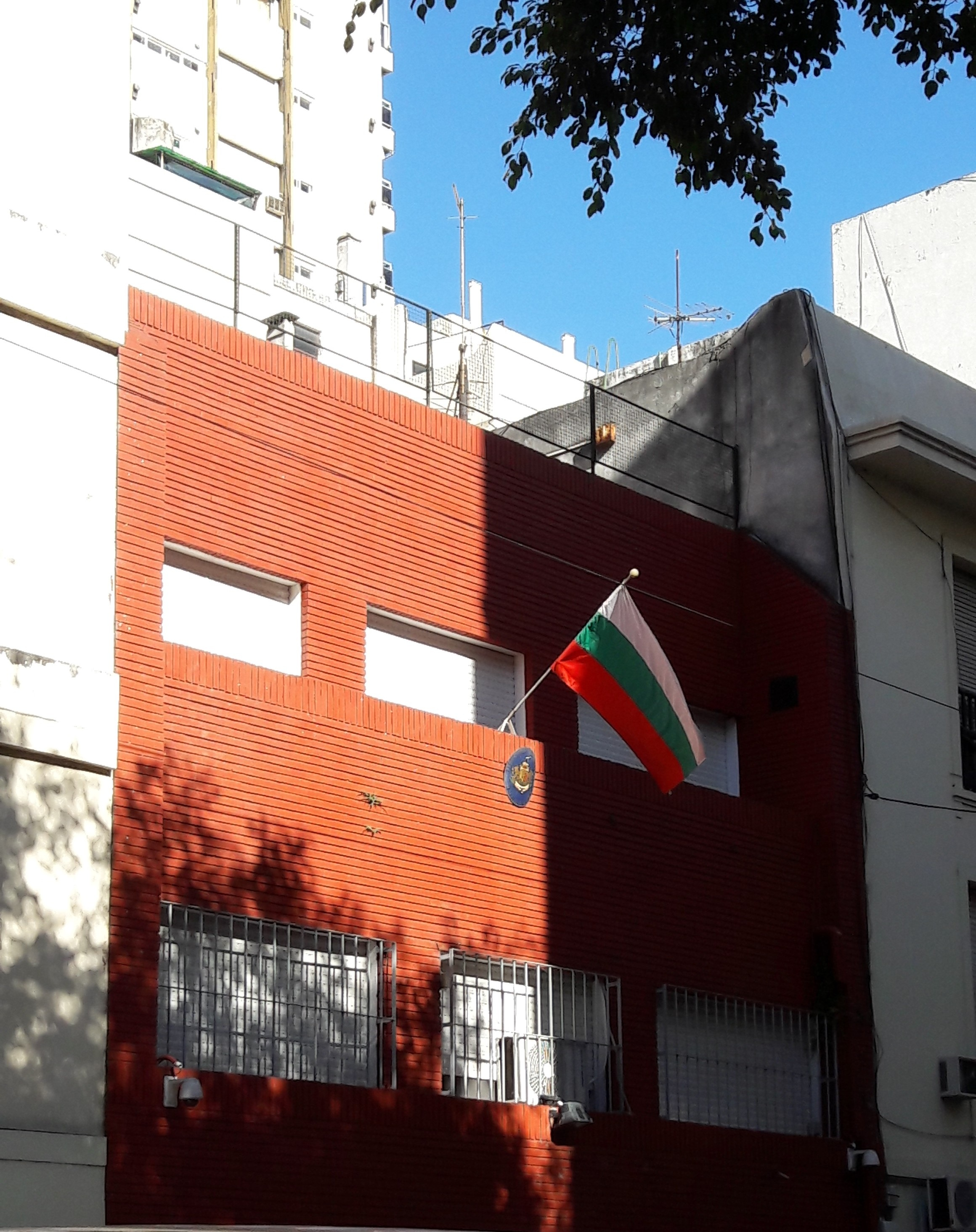
Embassy in Buenos Aires

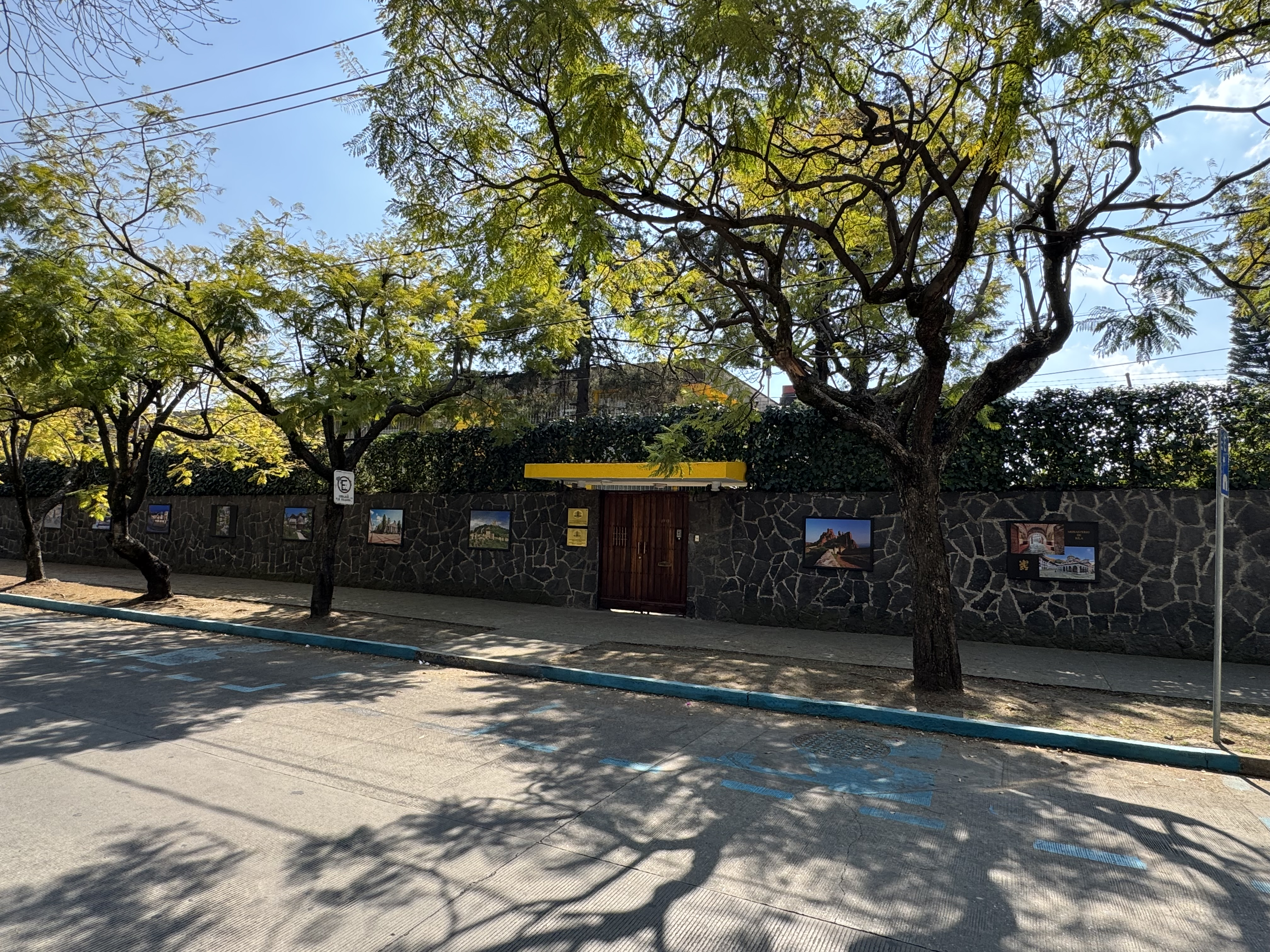
Embassy in Mexico City

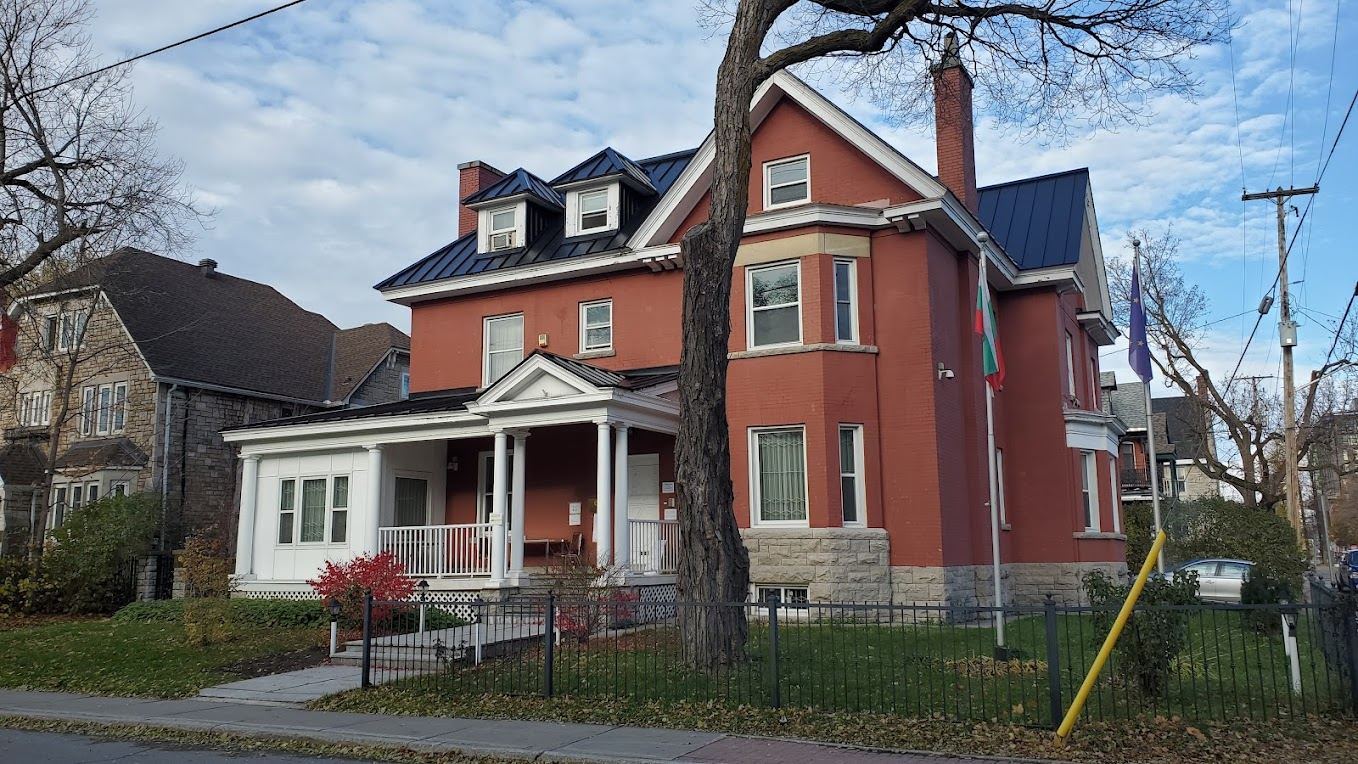
Embassy in Ottawa

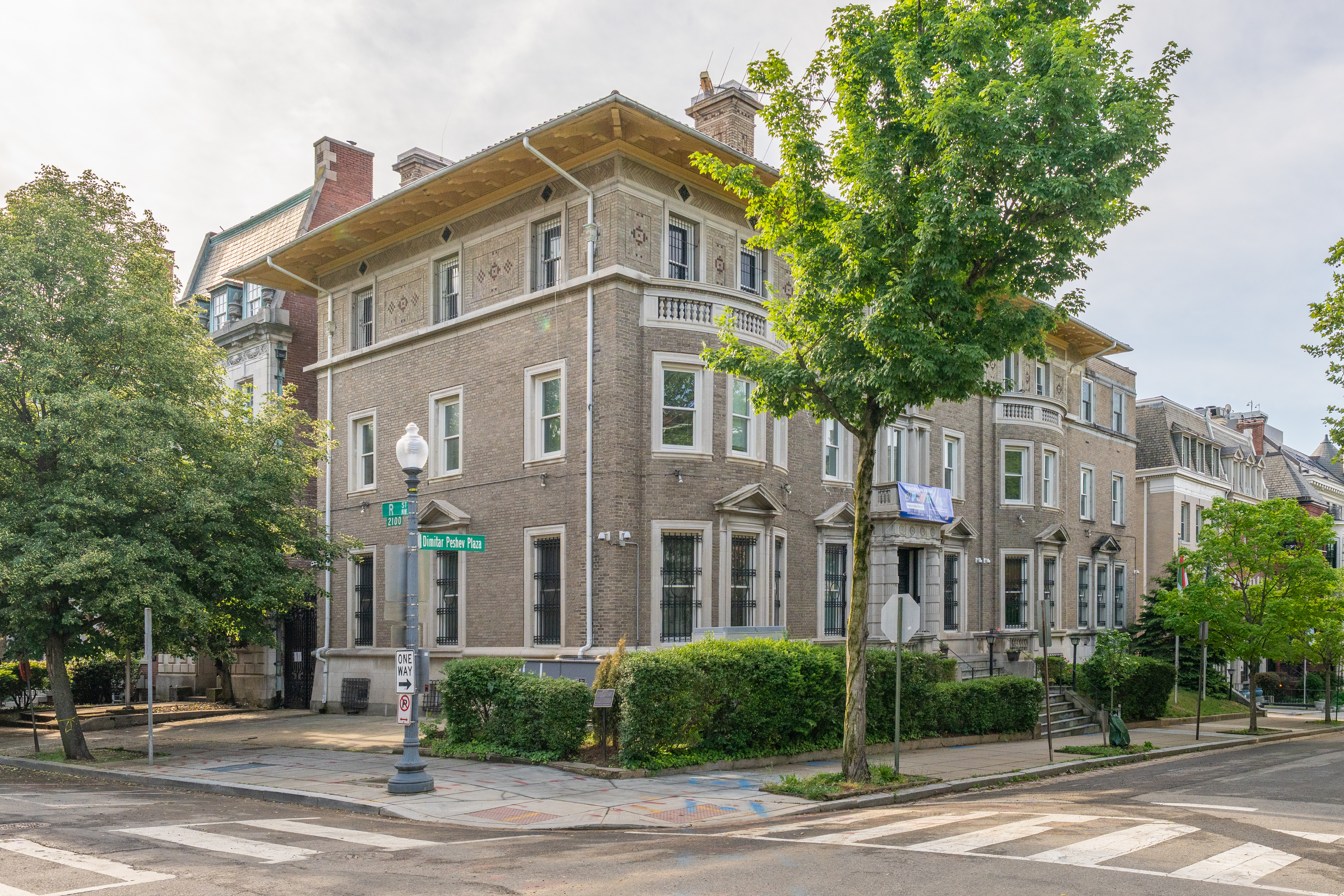
Embassy in Washington, D.C.

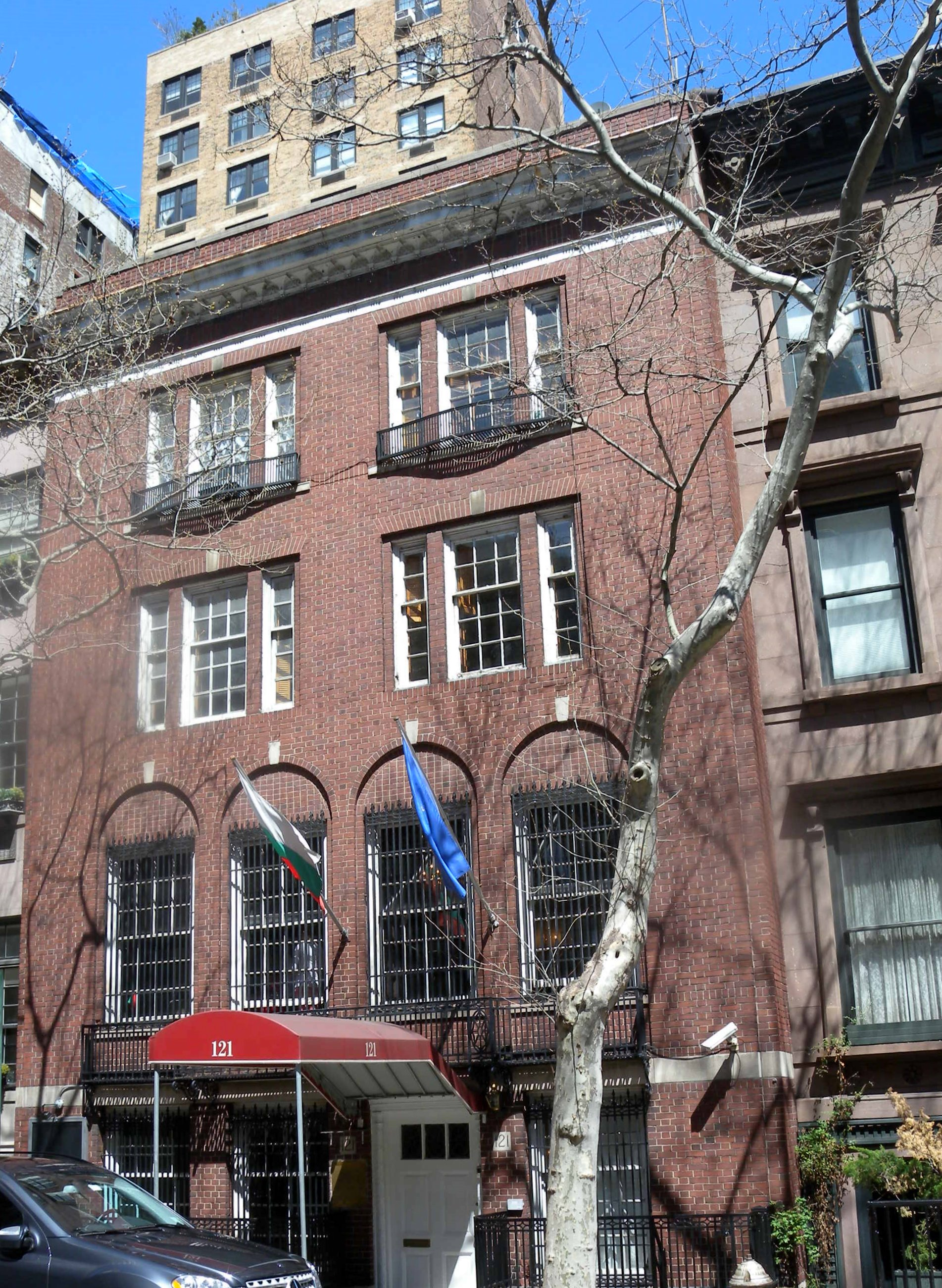
Consulate-General in New York City

=== Asia ===
Host country	Host city	Mission	Concurrent accreditation	Ref.
Armenia	Yerevan	Embassy		
Azerbaijan	Baku	Embassy	Countries: Turkmenistan	
China	Beijing	Embassy		
China	Shanghai	Consulate-General		
Georgia	Tbilisi	Embassy		
India	New Delhi	Embassy	Countries: Bangladesh; Bhutan; Maldives; Nepal; Sri Lanka	
Indonesia	Jakarta	Embassy	Countries: Brunei; Malaysia; Singapore; Timor-Leste; Multilateral Organizations: Association of Southeast Asian Nations (Note: Accredited as an observer mission.)	
Iran	Tehran	Embassy		
Iraq	Baghdad	Embassy		
Israel	Tel Aviv	Embassy		
Japan	Tokyo	Embassy		
Jordan	Amman	Embassy		
Kazakhstan	Astana	Embassy	Countries: Kyrgyzstan; Tajikistan	
Kuwait	Kuwait City	Embassy		
Lebanon	Beirut	Embassy		
Mongolia	Ulaanbaatar	Embassy		
North Korea	Pyongyang	Embassy		
Pakistan	Islamabad	Embassy		
Palestine	Ramallah	Representative office		
Qatar	Doha	Embassy	Countries: Oman	
Saudi Arabia	Riyadh	Embassy	Countries: Bahrain	
South Korea	Seoul	Embassy		
Syria	Damascus	Embassy		
Turkey	Ankara	Embassy		
Turkey	Edirne	Consulate-General		
Turkey	Istanbul	Consulate-General		
Turkey	Bursa	Consular office		
United Arab Emirates	Abu Dhabi	Embassy		
United Arab Emirates	Dubai	Consulate-General		
Uzbekistan	Tashkent	Embassy		
Vietnam	Hanoi	Embassy	Countries: Cambodia; Laos; Myanmar; Philippines; Thailand	

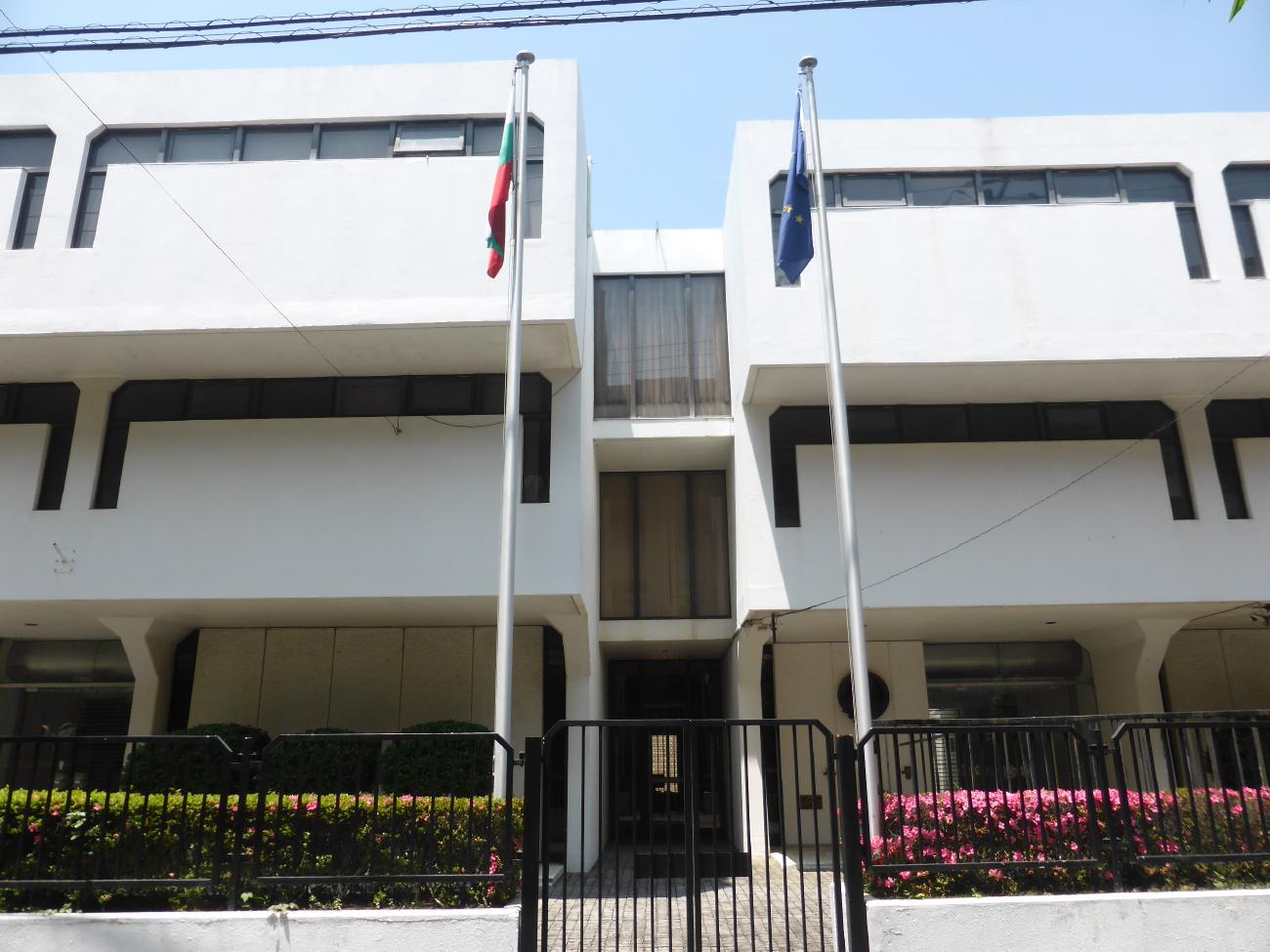
Embassy in Tokyo

=== Europe ===
Host country	Host city	Mission	Concurrent accreditation	Ref.
Albania	Tirana	Embassy		
Austria	Vienna	Embassy		
Belarus	Minsk	Embassy		
Belgium	Brussels	Embassy	Countries: Luxembourg	
Bosnia and Herzegovina	Sarajevo	Embassy		
Croatia	Zagreb	Embassy		
Cyprus	Nicosia	Embassy		
Czech Republic	Prague	Embassy		
Denmark	Copenhagen	Embassy		
Finland	Helsinki	Embassy	Countries: Estonia	
France	Paris	Embassy	Countries: Monaco	
France	Lyon	Consulate-General	Countries: Monaco	
Germany	Berlin	Embassy		
Germany	Düsseldorf	Consulate-General		
Germany	Frankfurt	Consulate-General		
Germany	Munich	Consulate-General		
Greece	Athens	Embassy		
Greece	Thessaloniki	Consulate-General		
Holy See (Note: The Bulgarian Embassy to the Holy See is located outside Vatican territory in Rome.)	Rome	Embassy	Sovereign Entity: Sovereign Military Order of Malta	
Hungary	Budapest	Embassy		
Ireland	Dublin	Embassy		
Italy	Rome	Embassy	Countries: Malta; San Marino	
Italy	Milan	Consulate-General	Countries: Malta; San Marino	
Kosovo	Pristina	Embassy		
Moldova	Chişinău	Embassy		
Moldova	Taraclia	Consulate		
Montenegro	Podgorica	Embassy		
Netherlands	The Hague	Embassy		
North Macedonia	Skopje	Embassy		
North Macedonia	Bitola	Consulate		
Norway	Oslo	Embassy	Countries: Iceland	
Poland	Warsaw	Embassy	Countries: Latvia; Lithuania	
Portugal	Lisbon	Embassy	Countries: Cape Verde	
Romania	Bucharest	Embassy		
Russia	Moscow	Embassy		
Russia	Saint Petersburg	Consulate-General		
Serbia	Belgrade	Embassy		
Serbia	Niš	Consulate-General		
Slovakia	Bratislava	Embassy		
Slovenia	Ljubljana	Embassy		
Spain	Madrid	Embassy	Countries: Andorra	
Spain	Barcelona	Consulate-General	Countries: Andorra	
Spain	Valencia	Consulate-General	Countries: Andorra	
Sweden	Stockholm	Embassy		
Switzerland	Bern	Embassy	Countries: Liechtenstein	
Ukraine	Kyiv	Embassy		
Ukraine	Odesa	Consulate-General		
United Kingdom	London	Embassy		
United Kingdom	Edinburgh	Consulate		

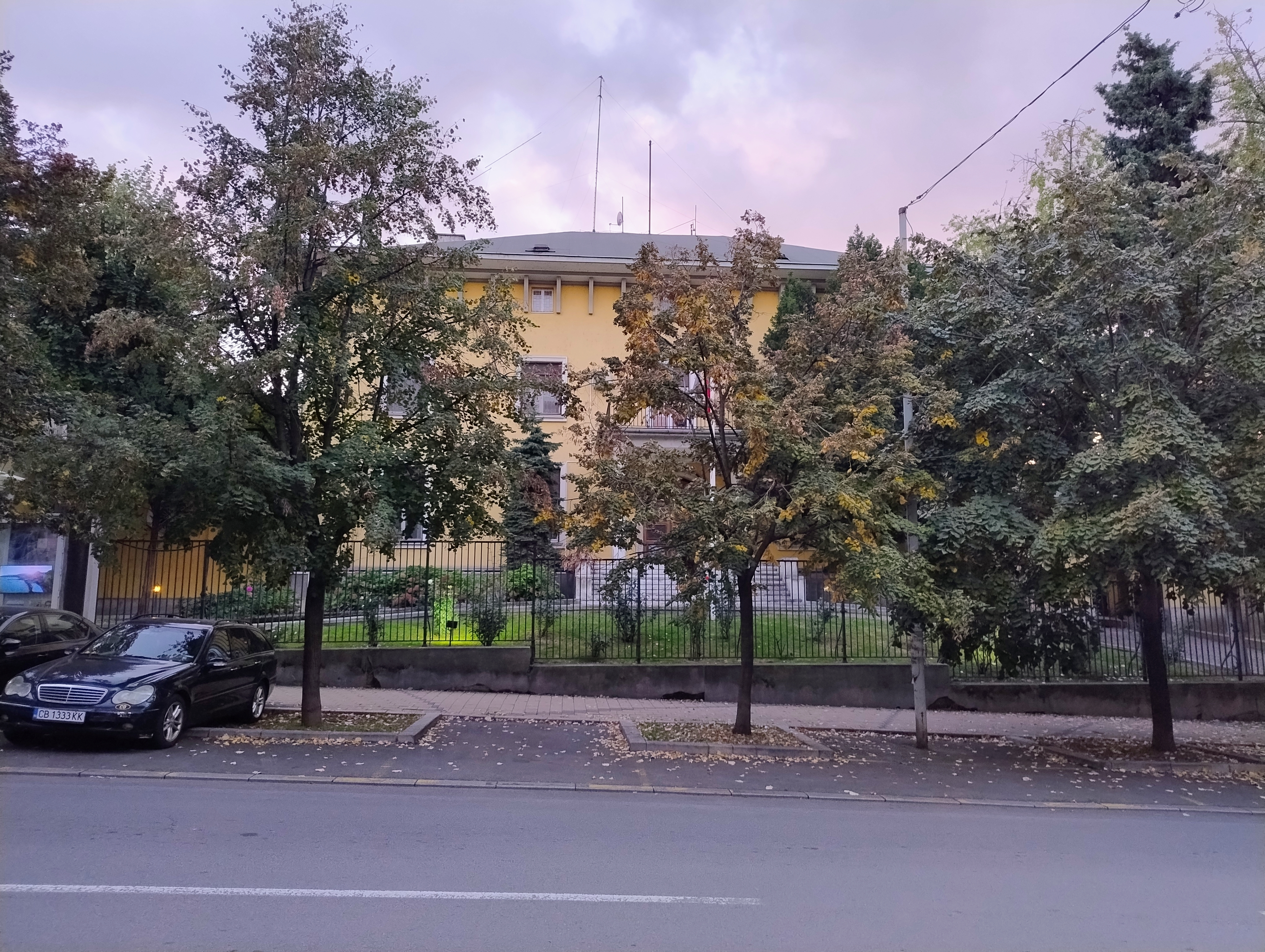
Embassy in Belgrade

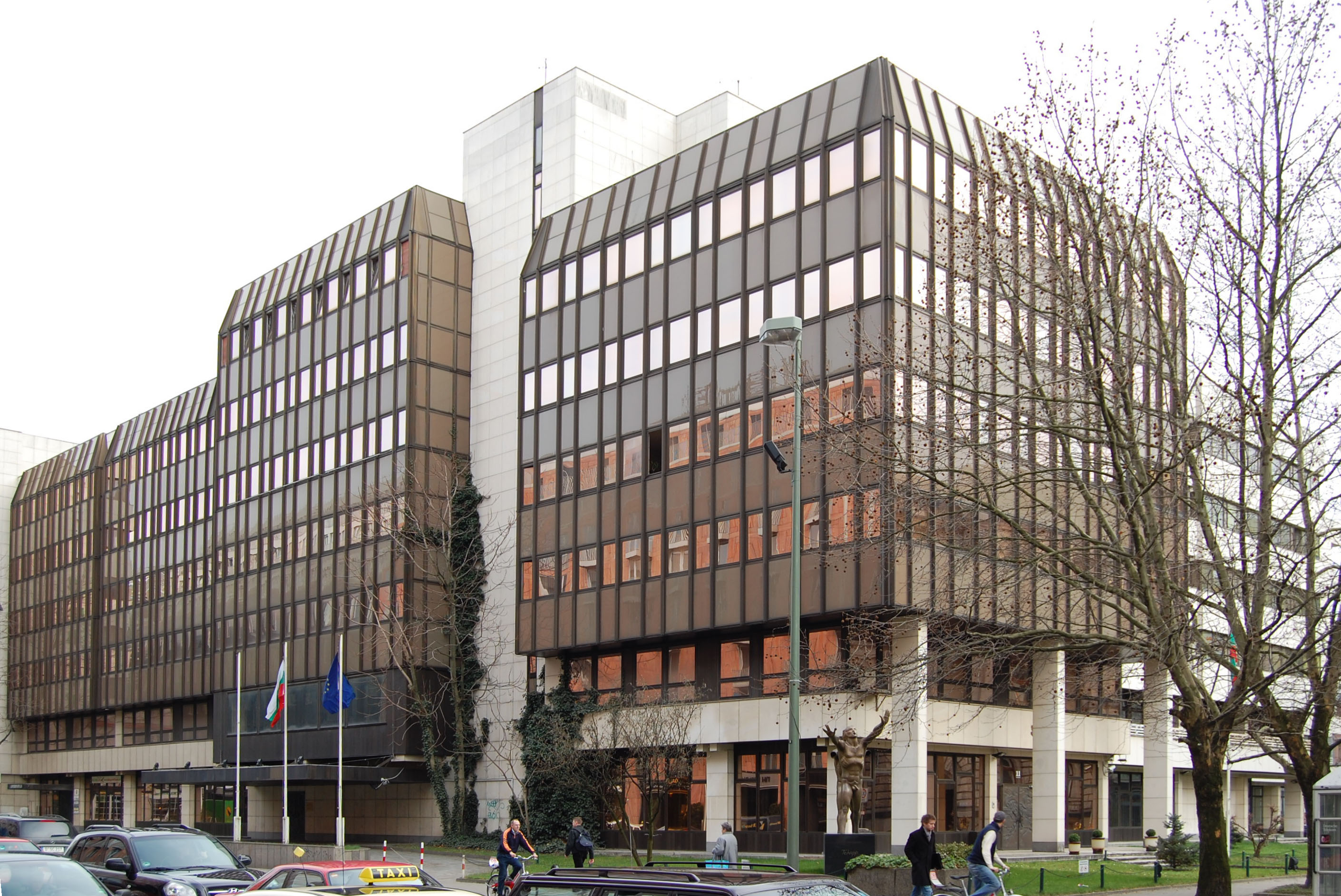
Embassy in Berlin

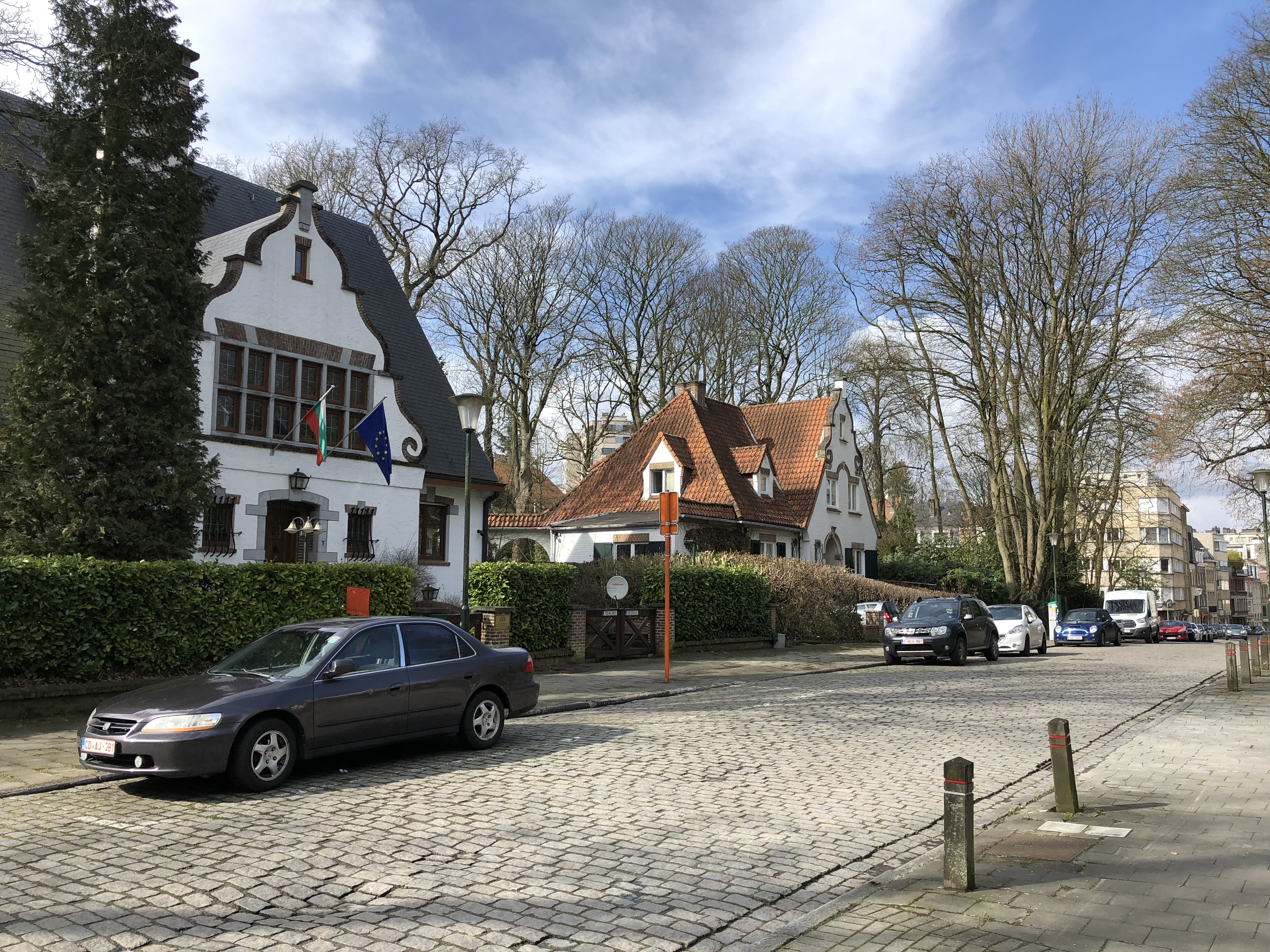
Embassy in Brussels

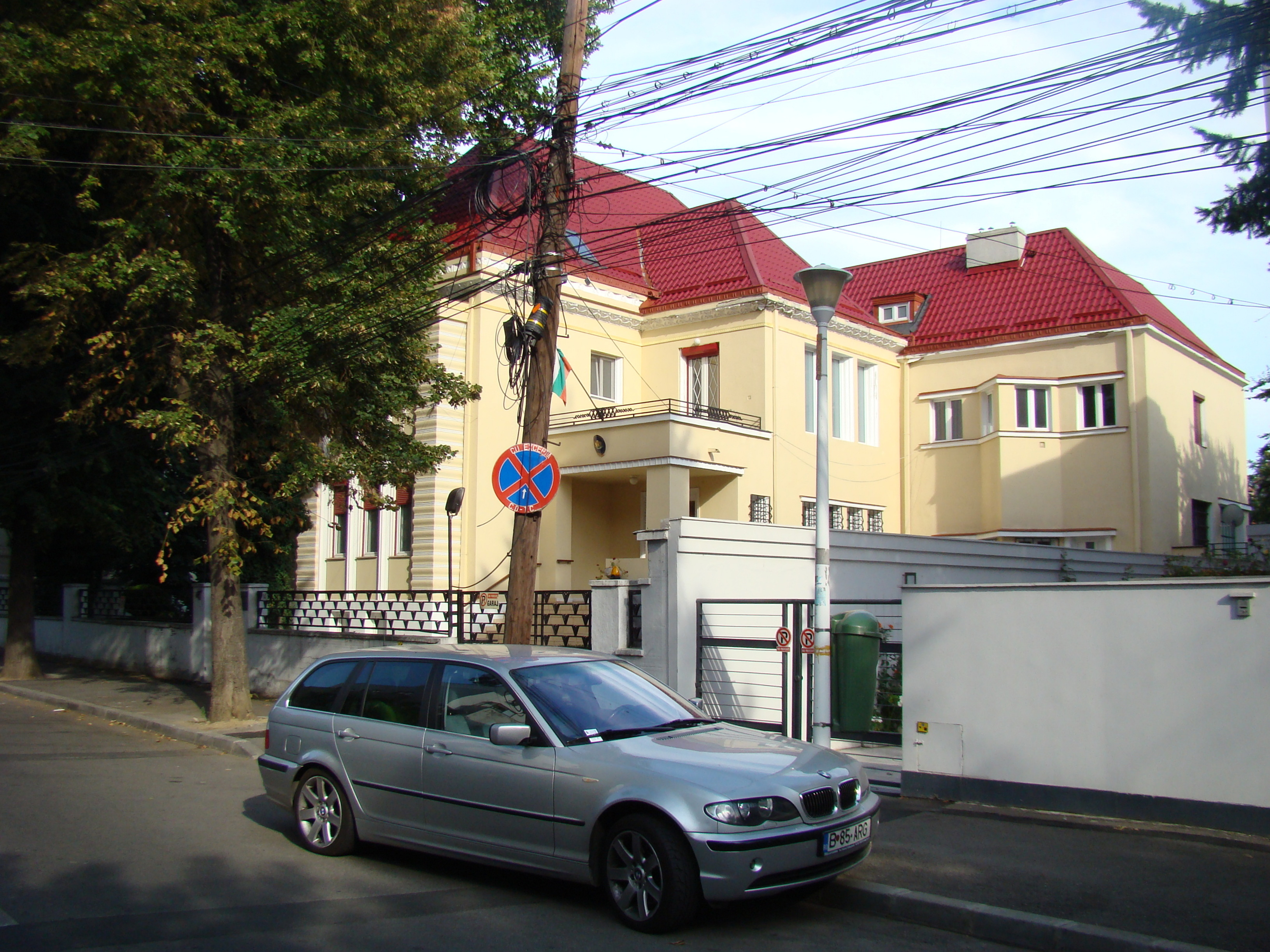
Embassy in Bucharest

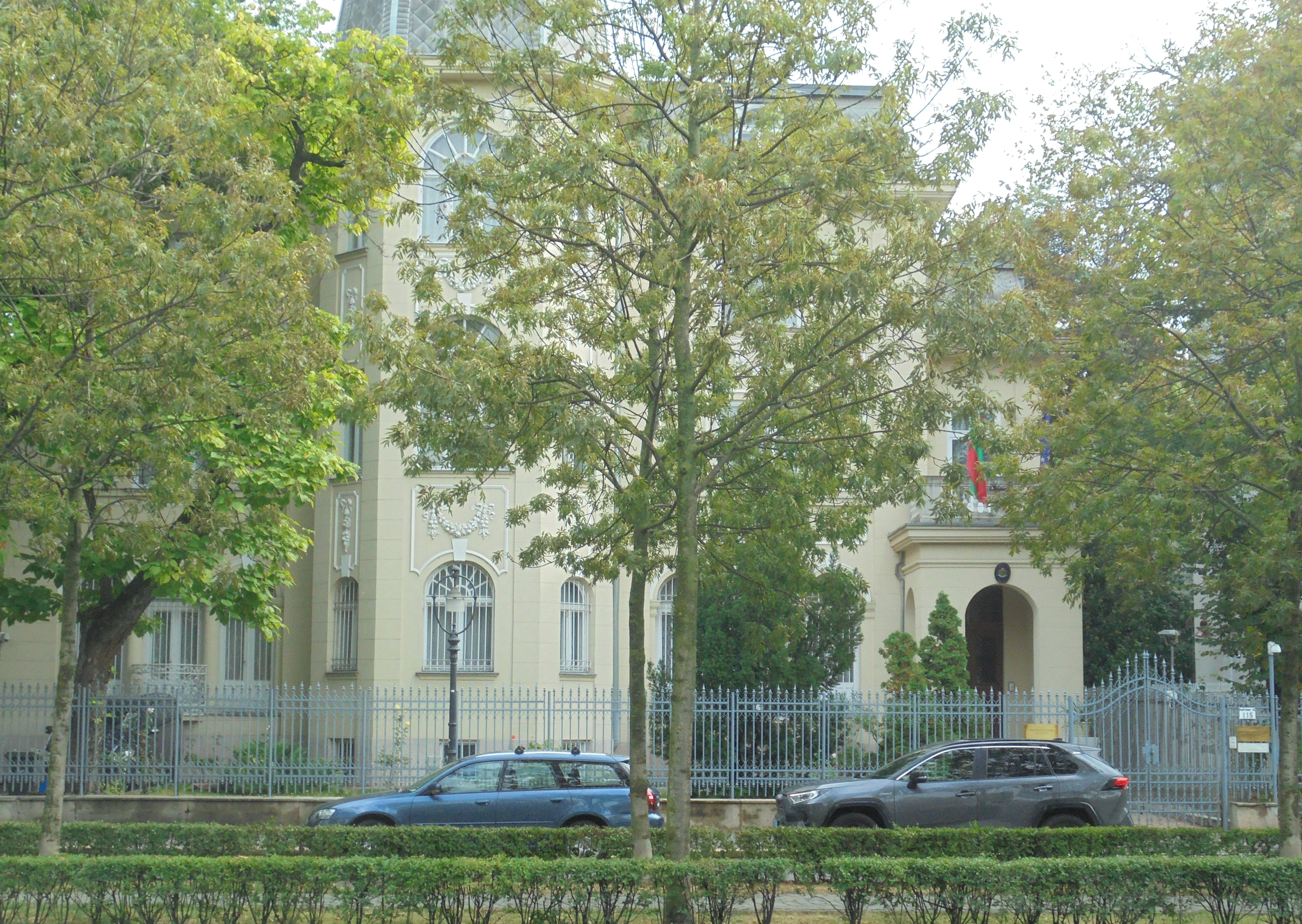
Embassy in Budapest

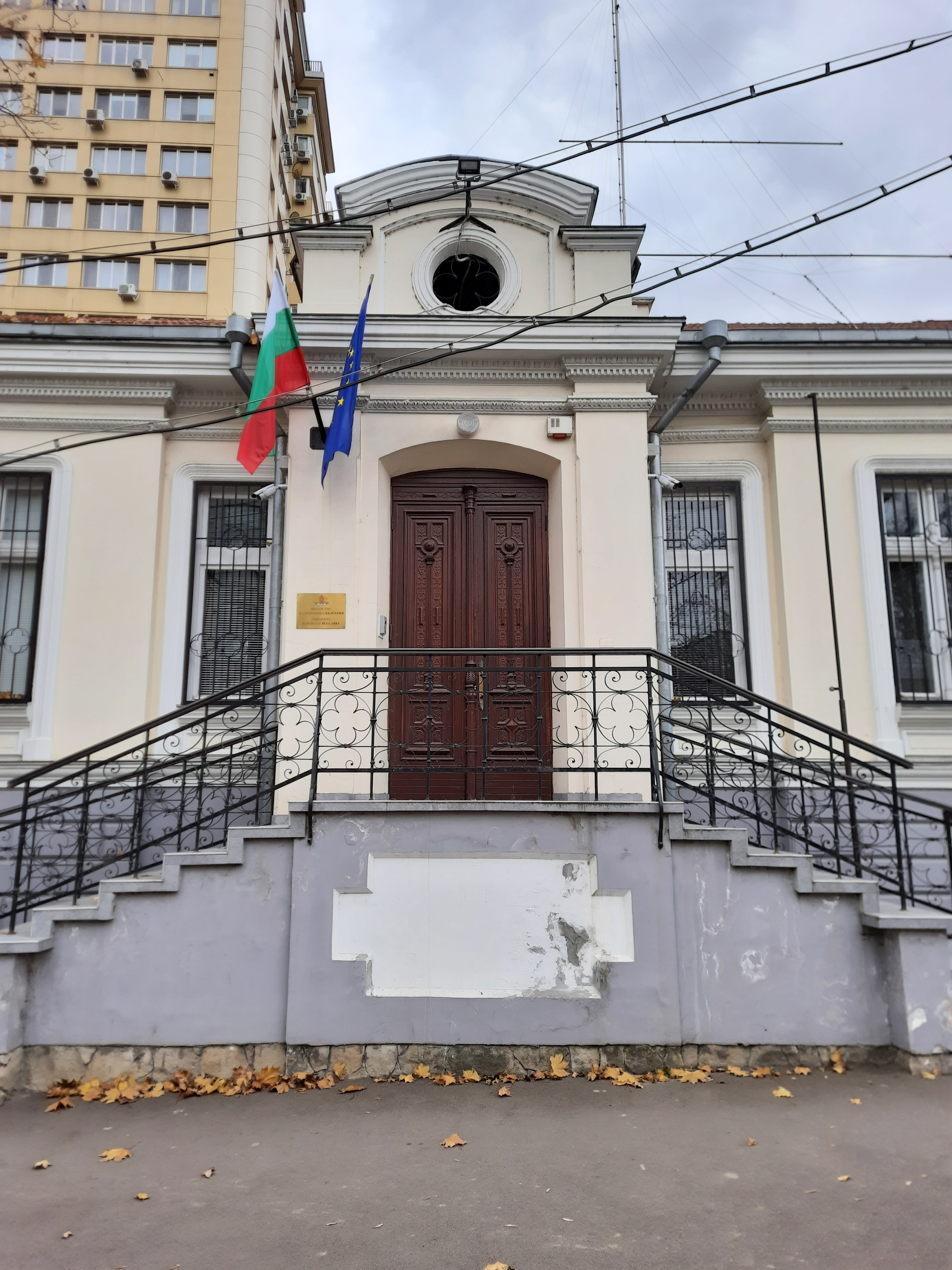
Embassy in Chişinău

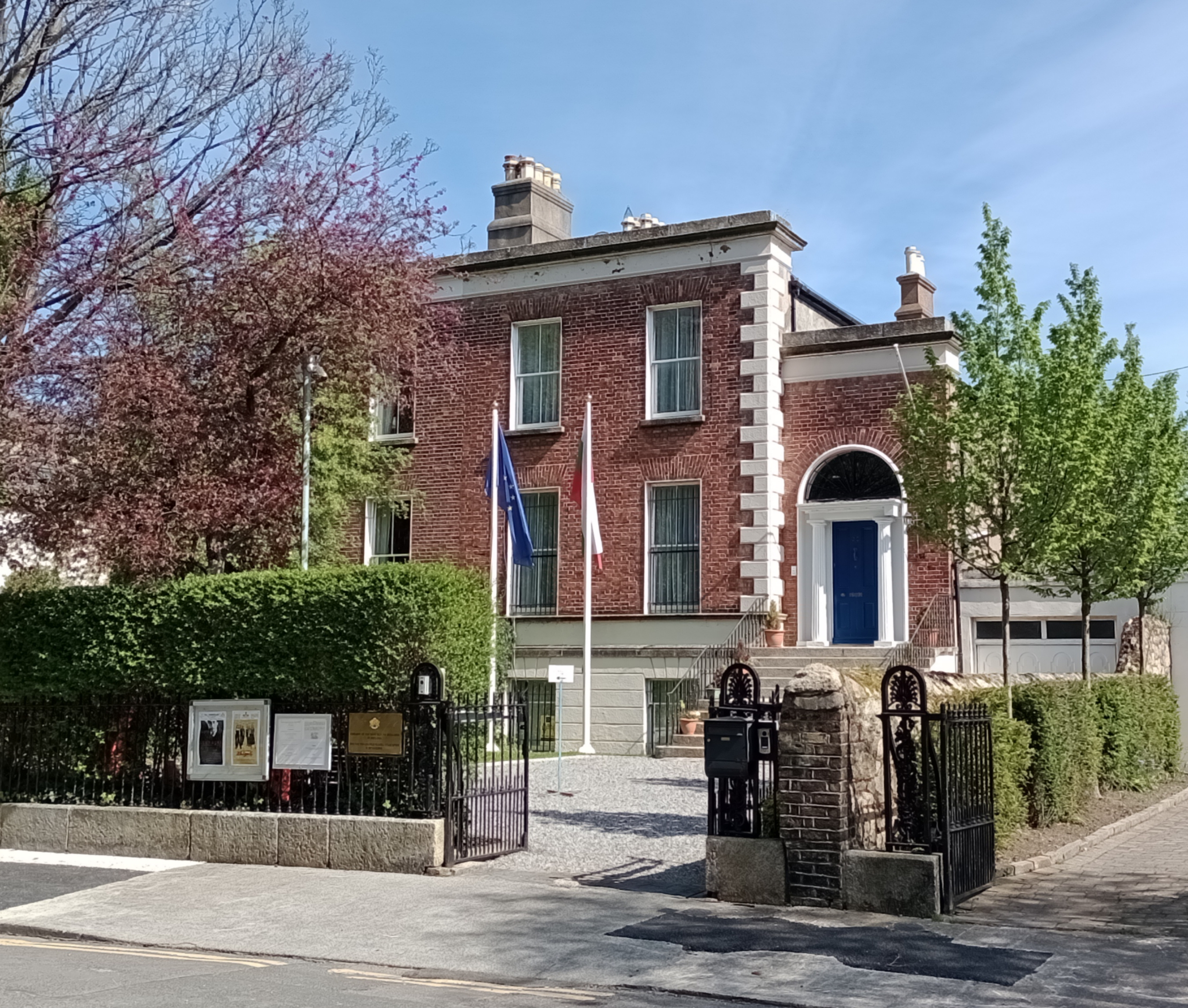
Embassy in Dublin

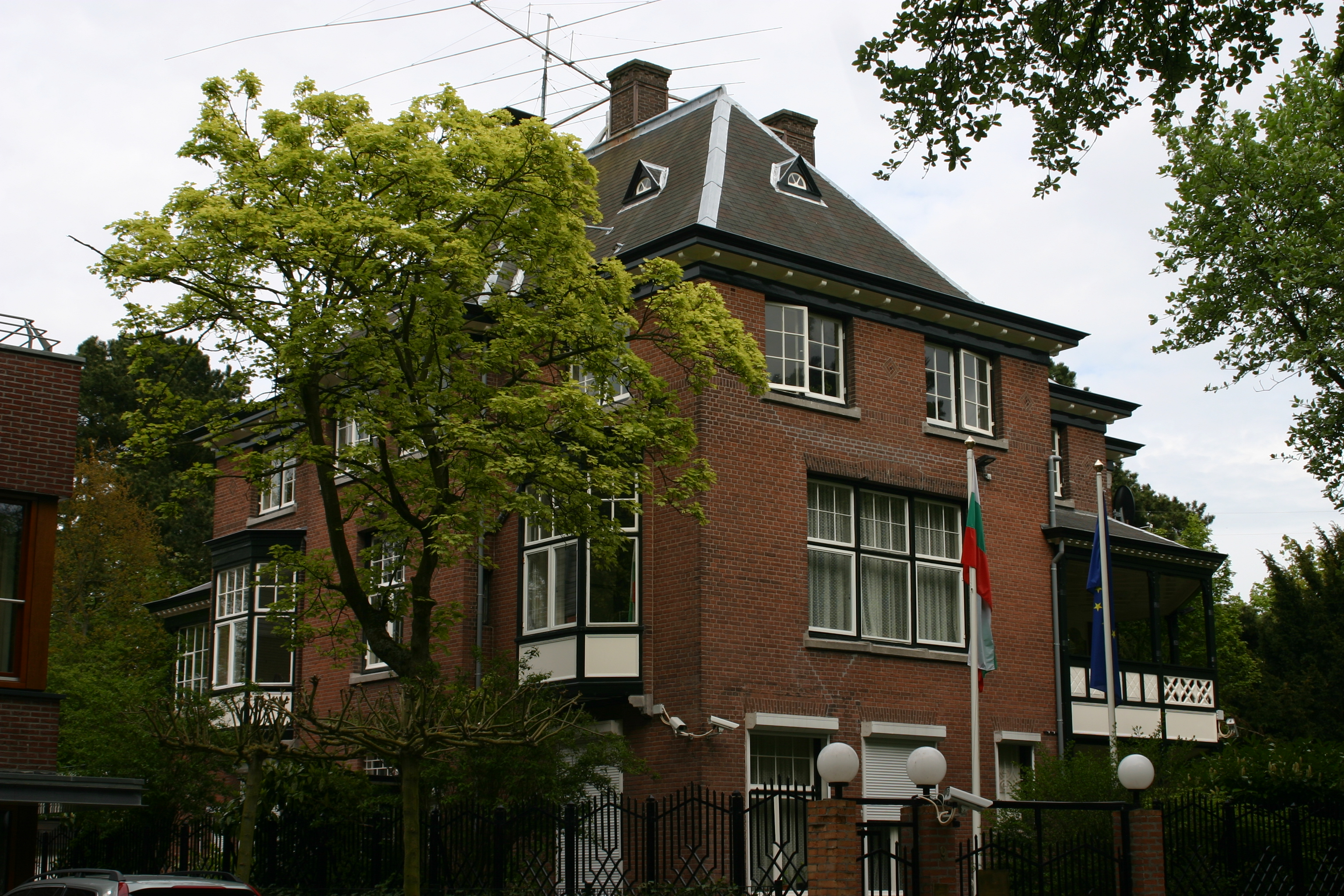
Embassy in The Hague

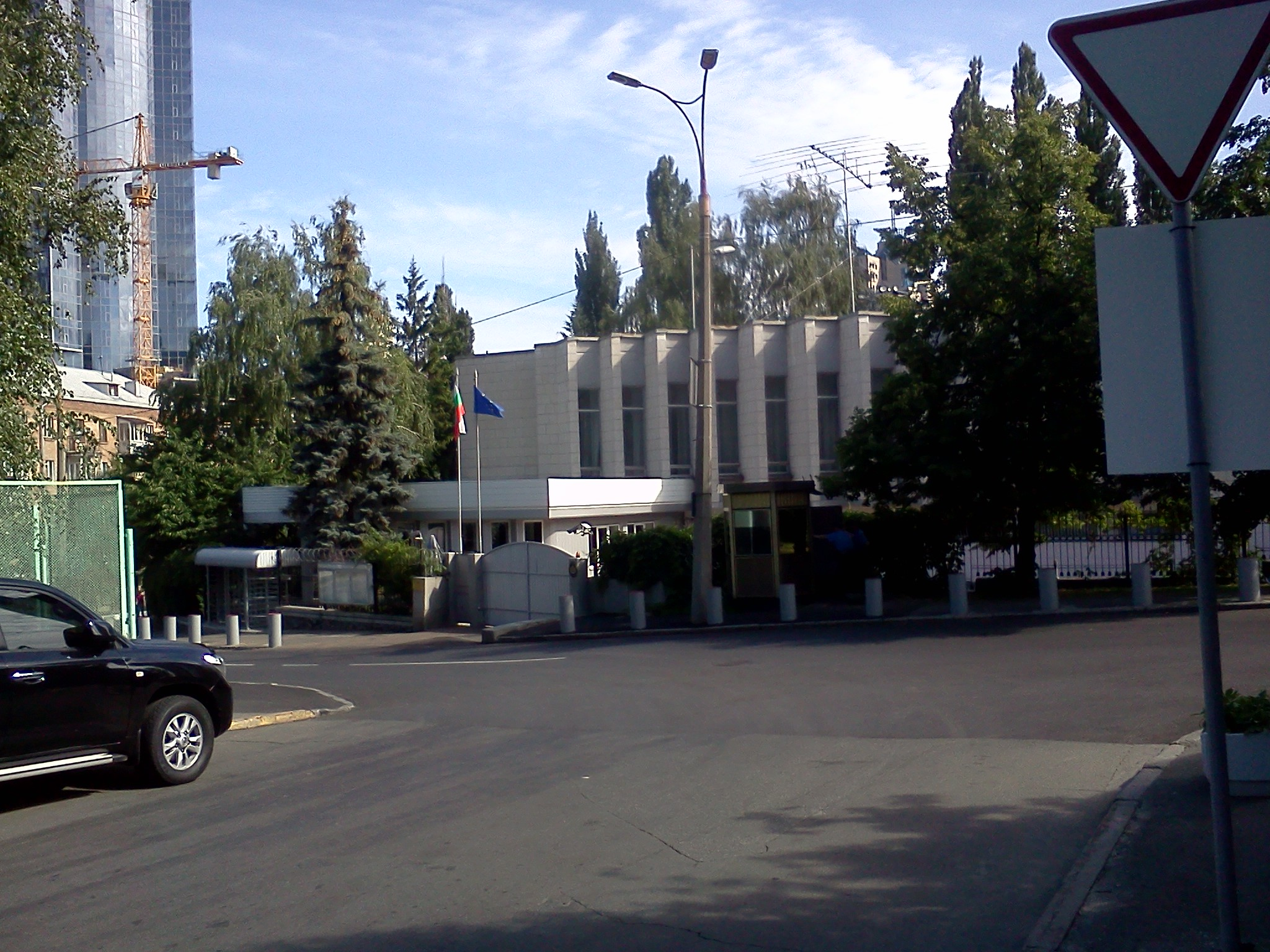
Embassy in Kyiv

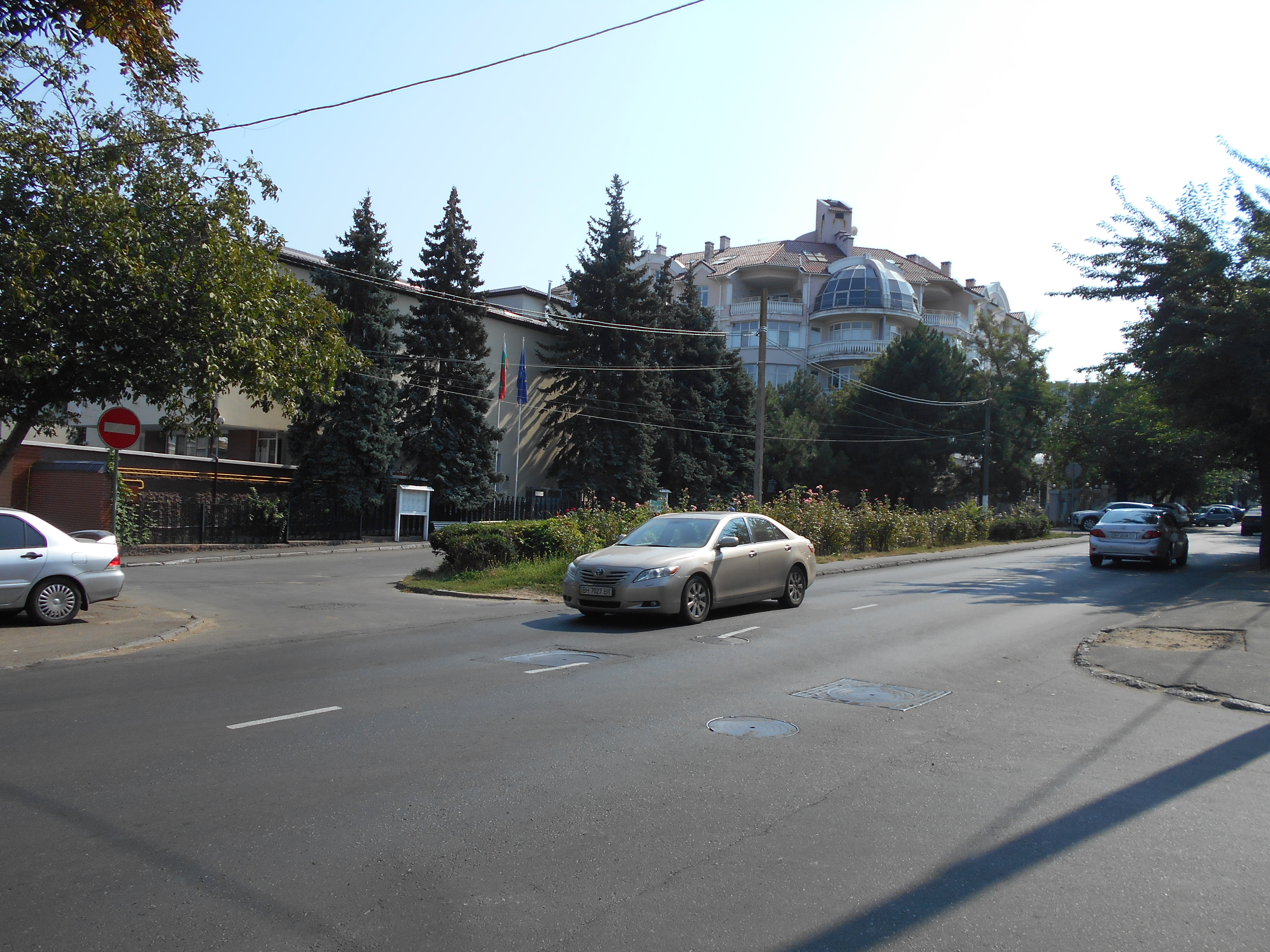
Consulate-General in Odesa

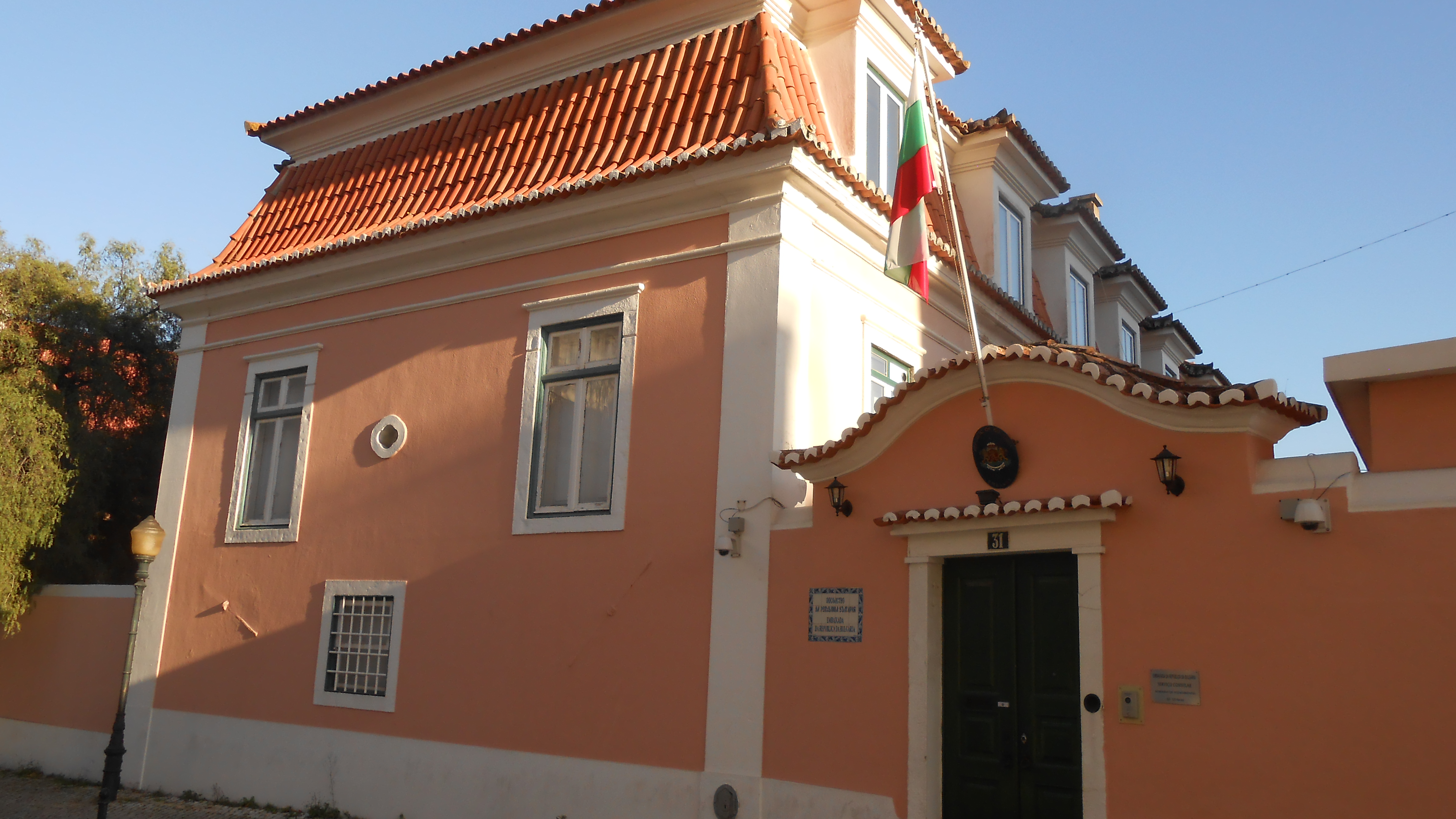
Embassy in Lisbon

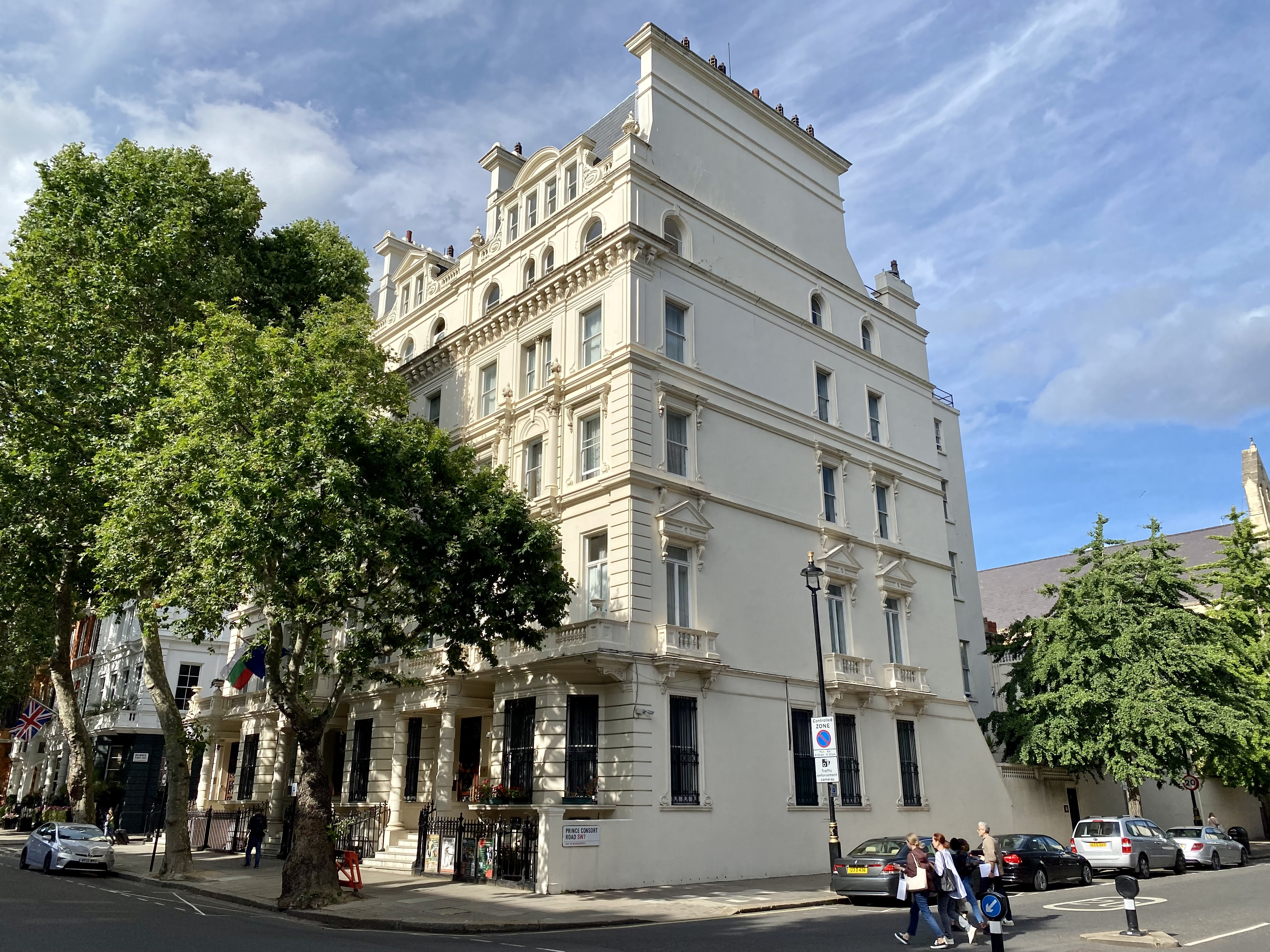
Embassy in London

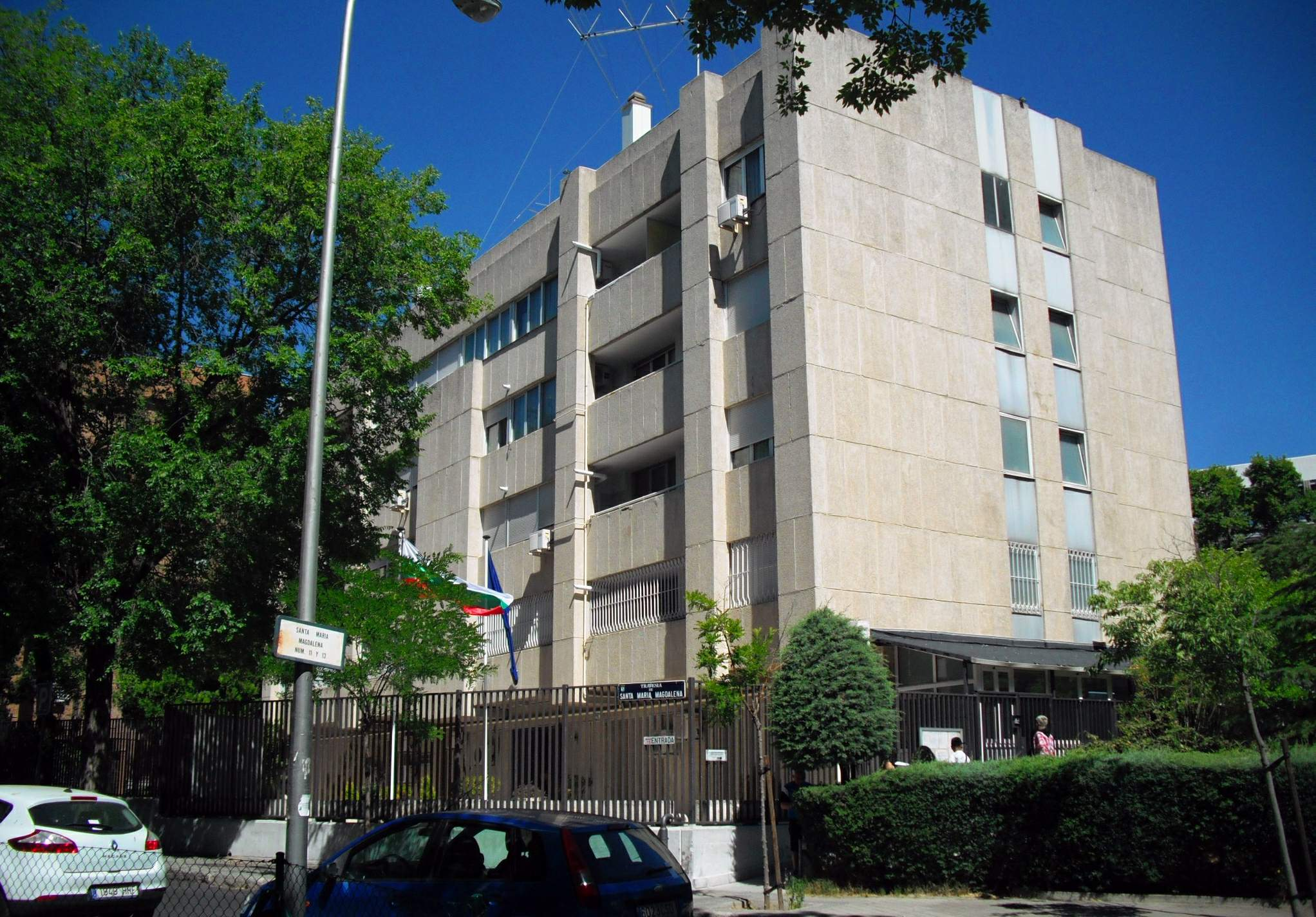
Embassy in Madrid

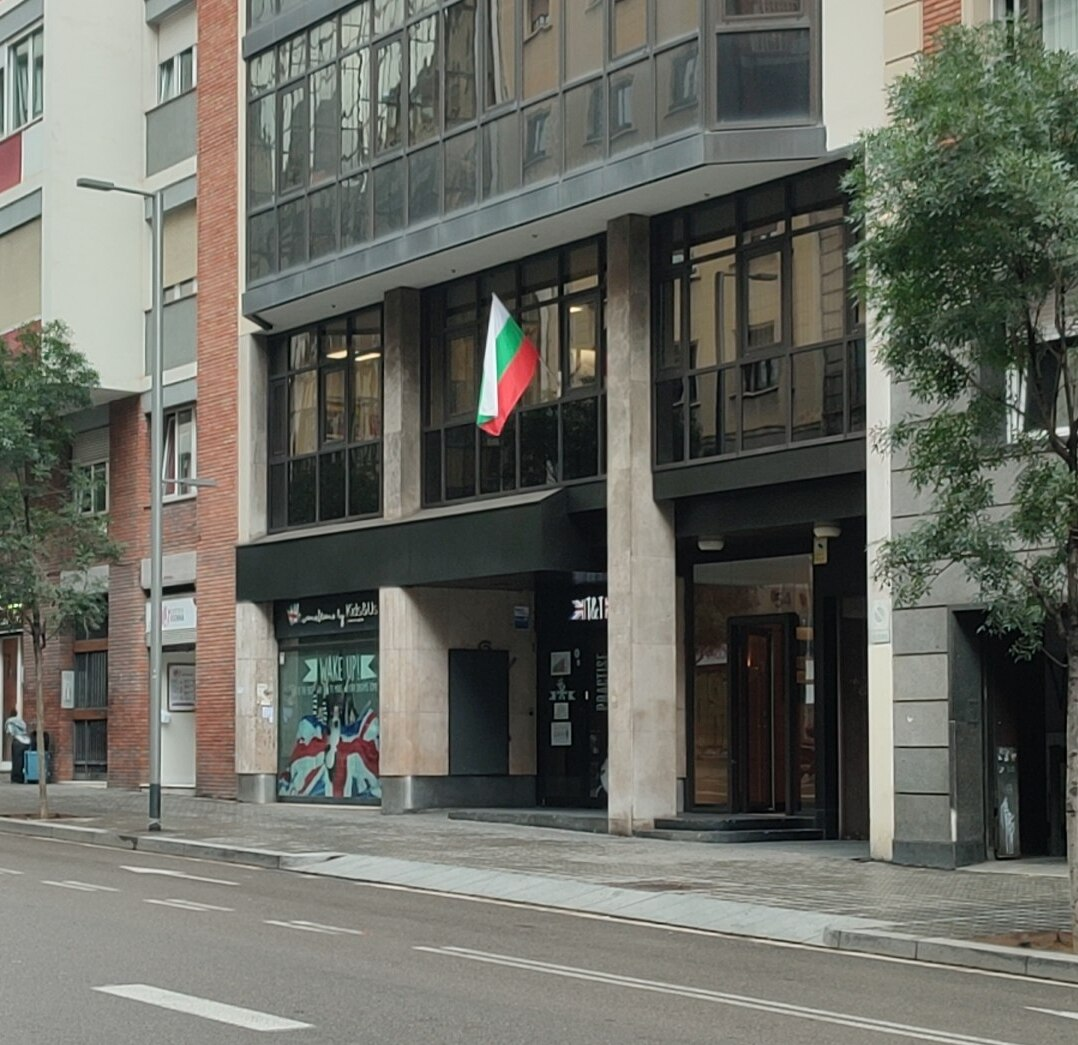
Consulate-General in Barcelona

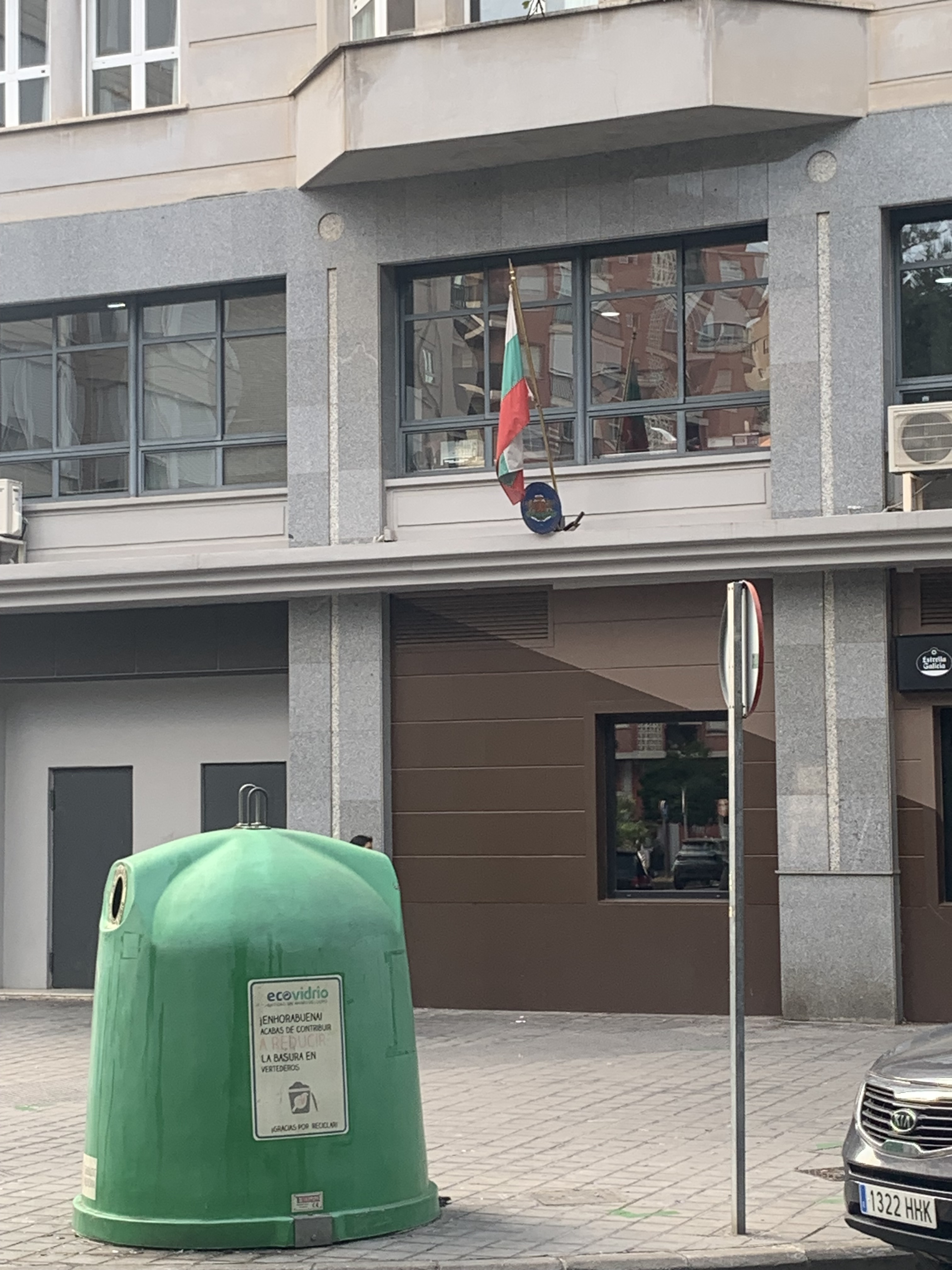
Consulate-General in Valencia

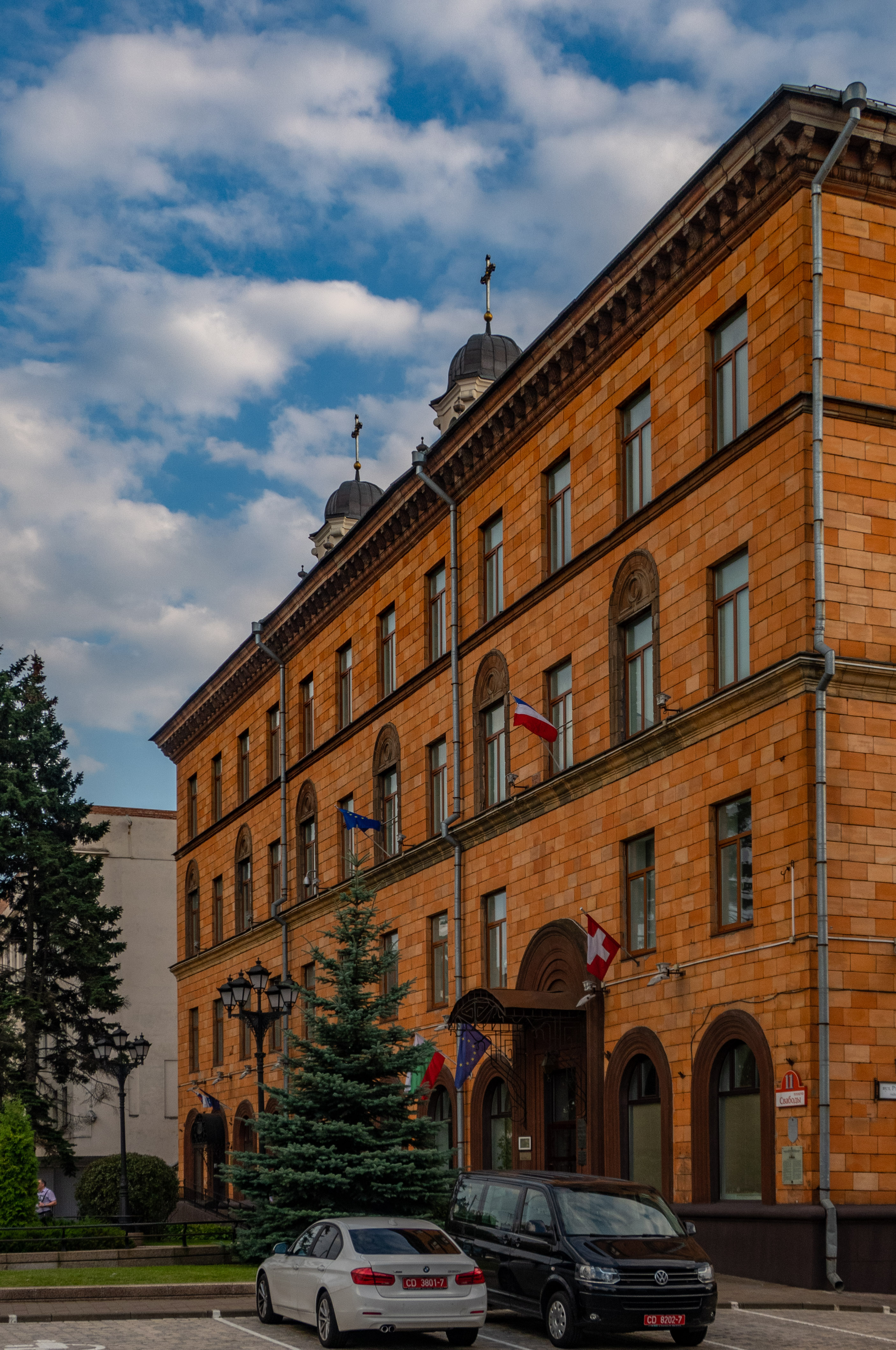
Embassy in Minsk

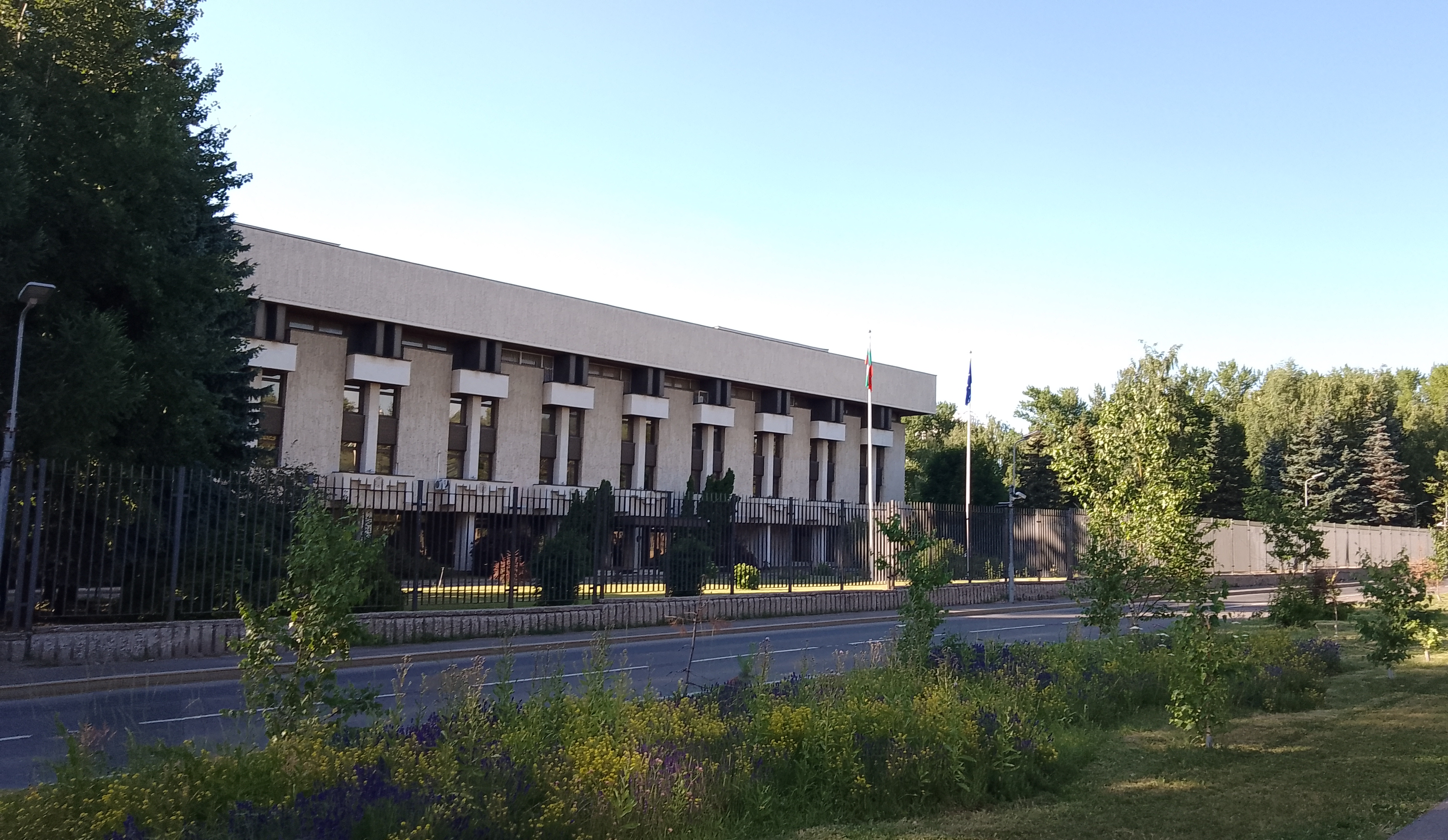
Embassy in Moscow

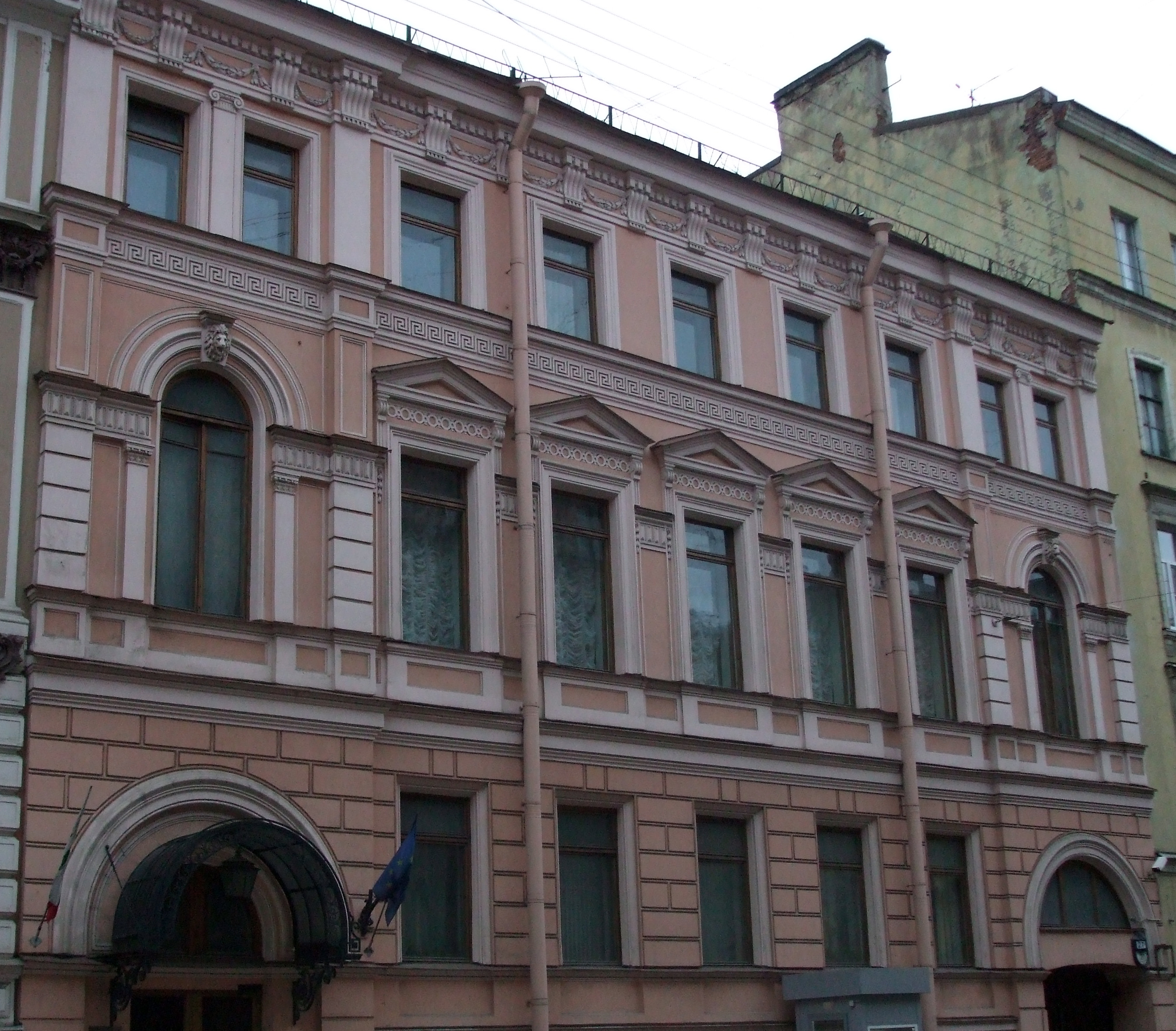
Consulate-General in Saint Petersburg

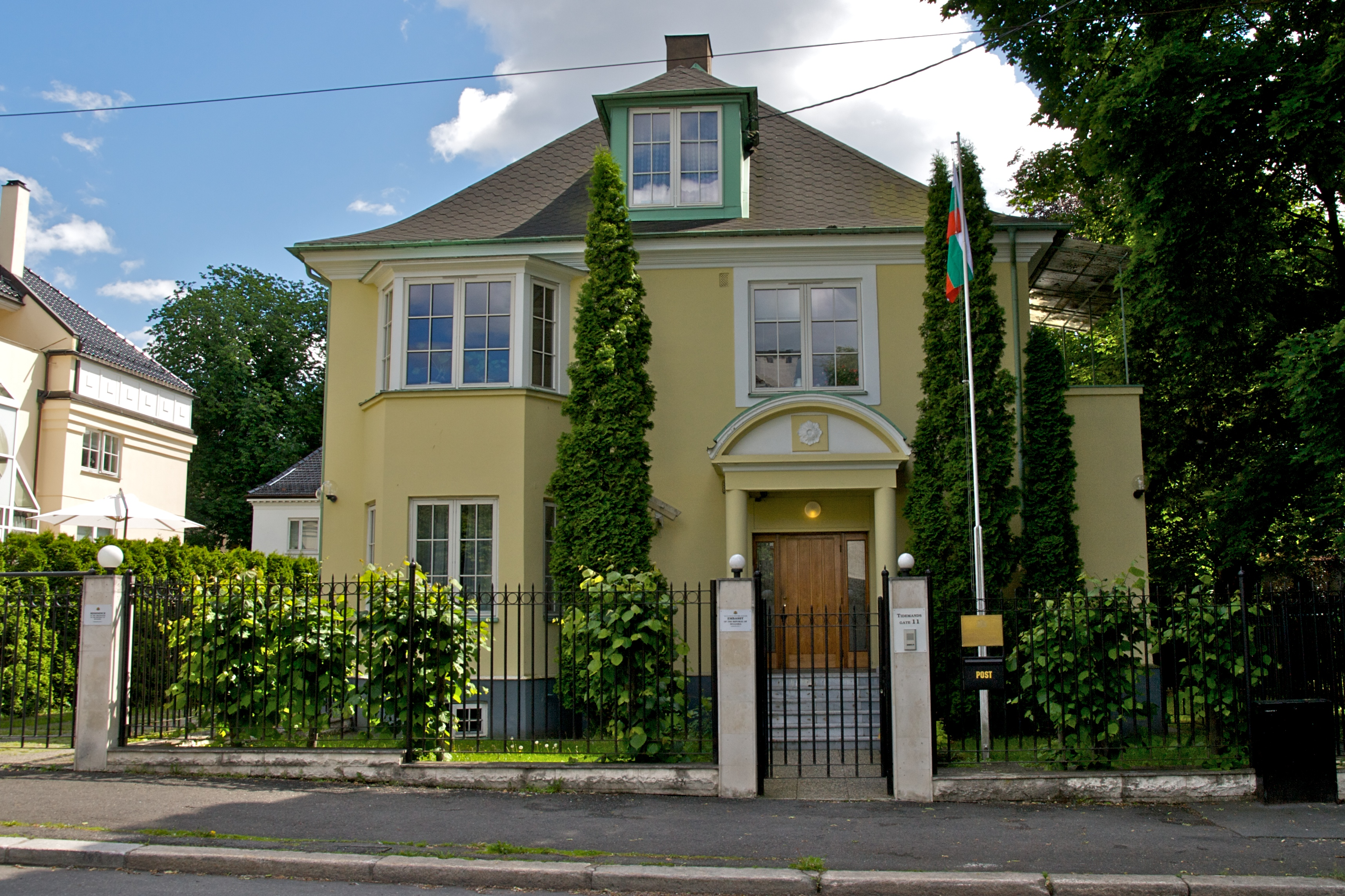
Embassy in Oslo

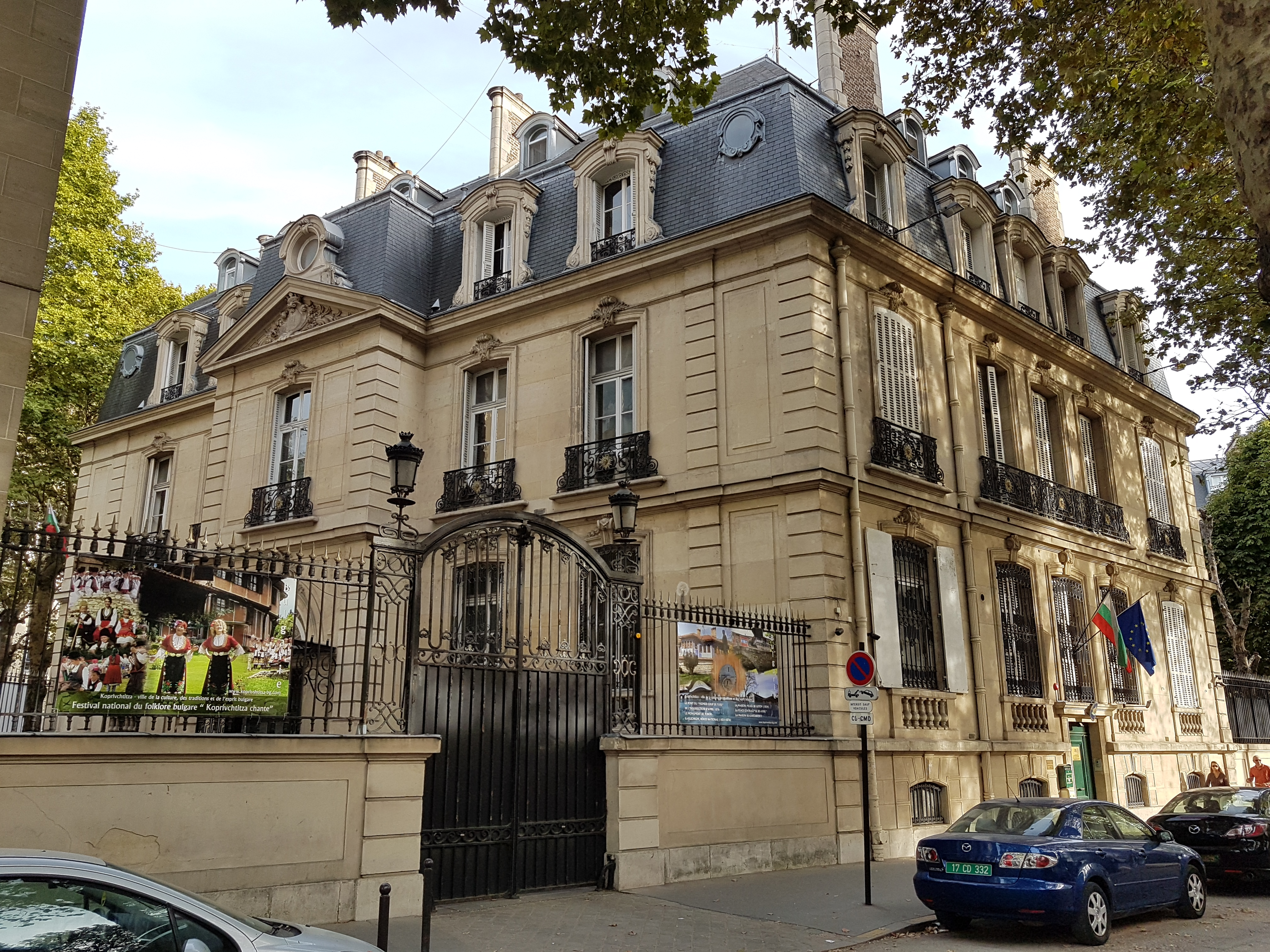
Embassy in Paris

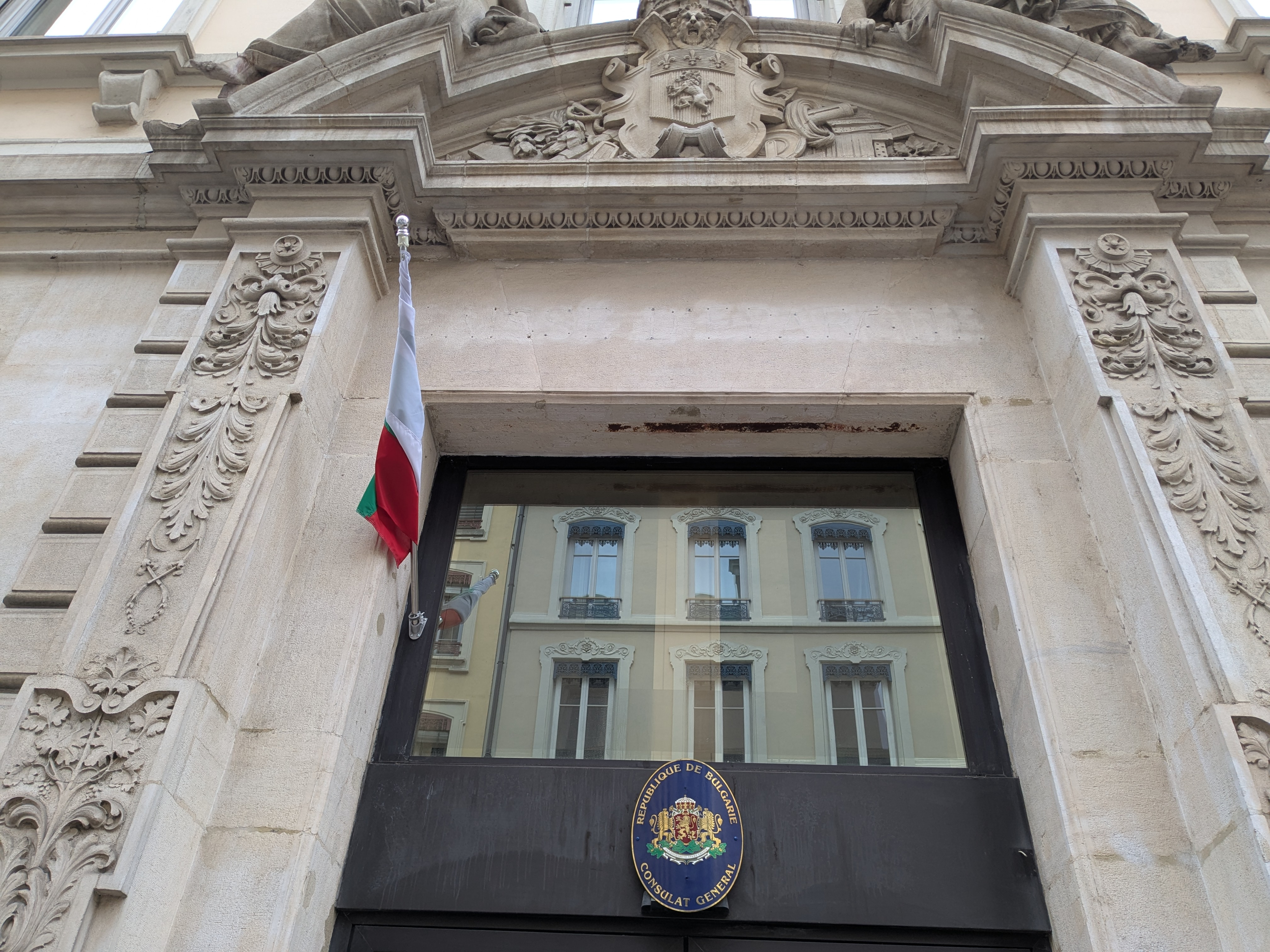
Consulate-General in Lyon

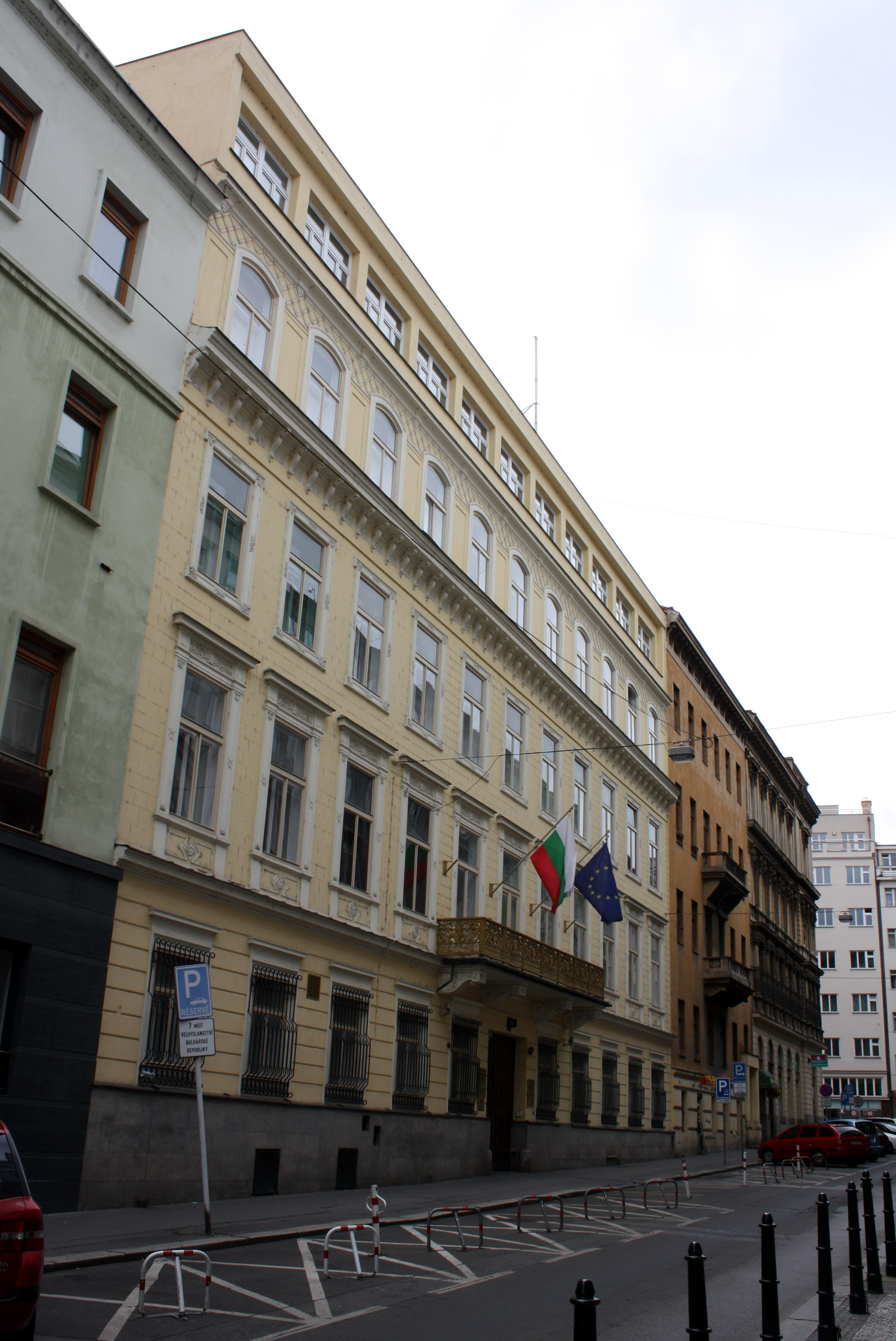
Embassy in Prague

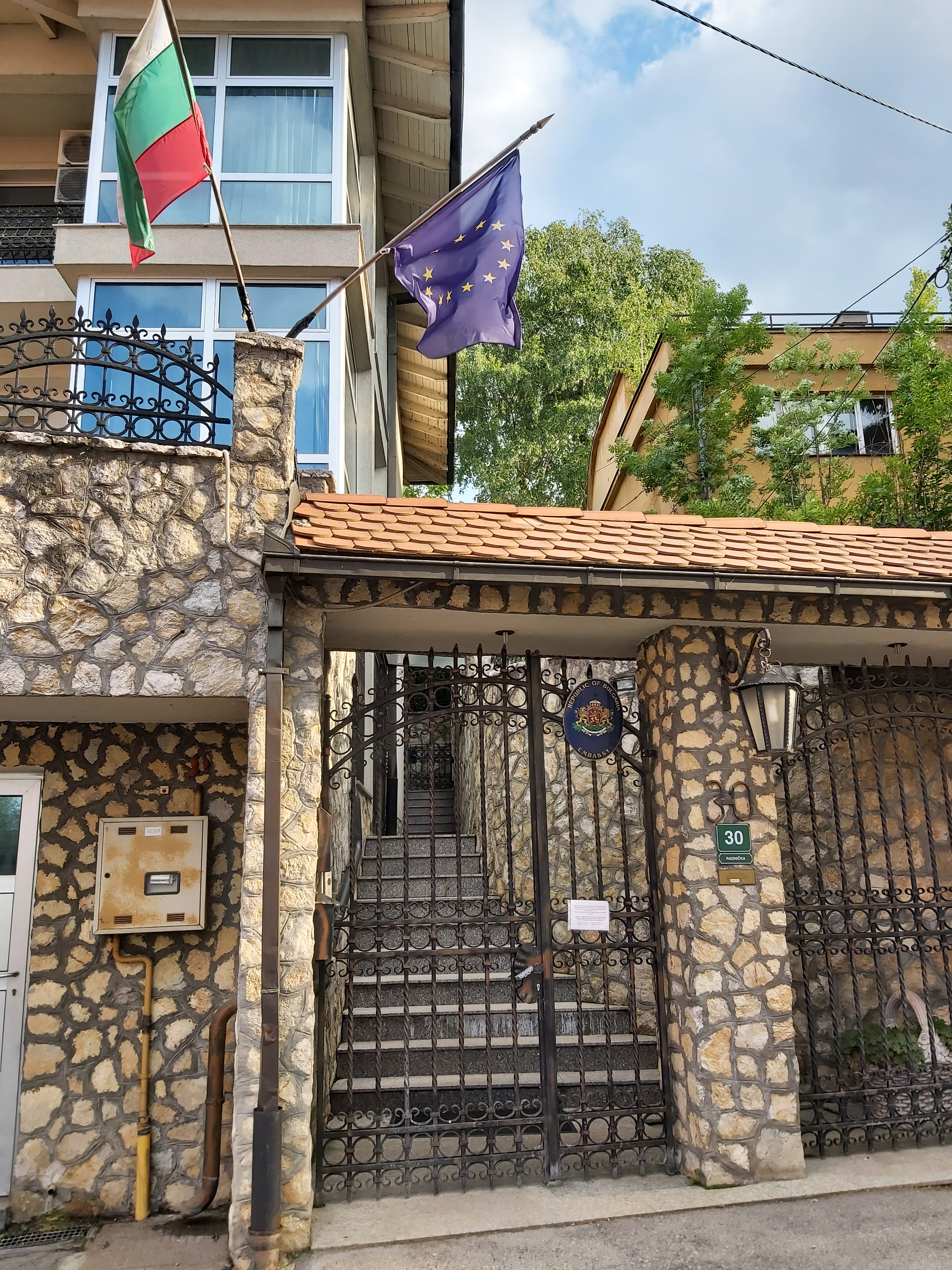
Embassy in Sarajevo

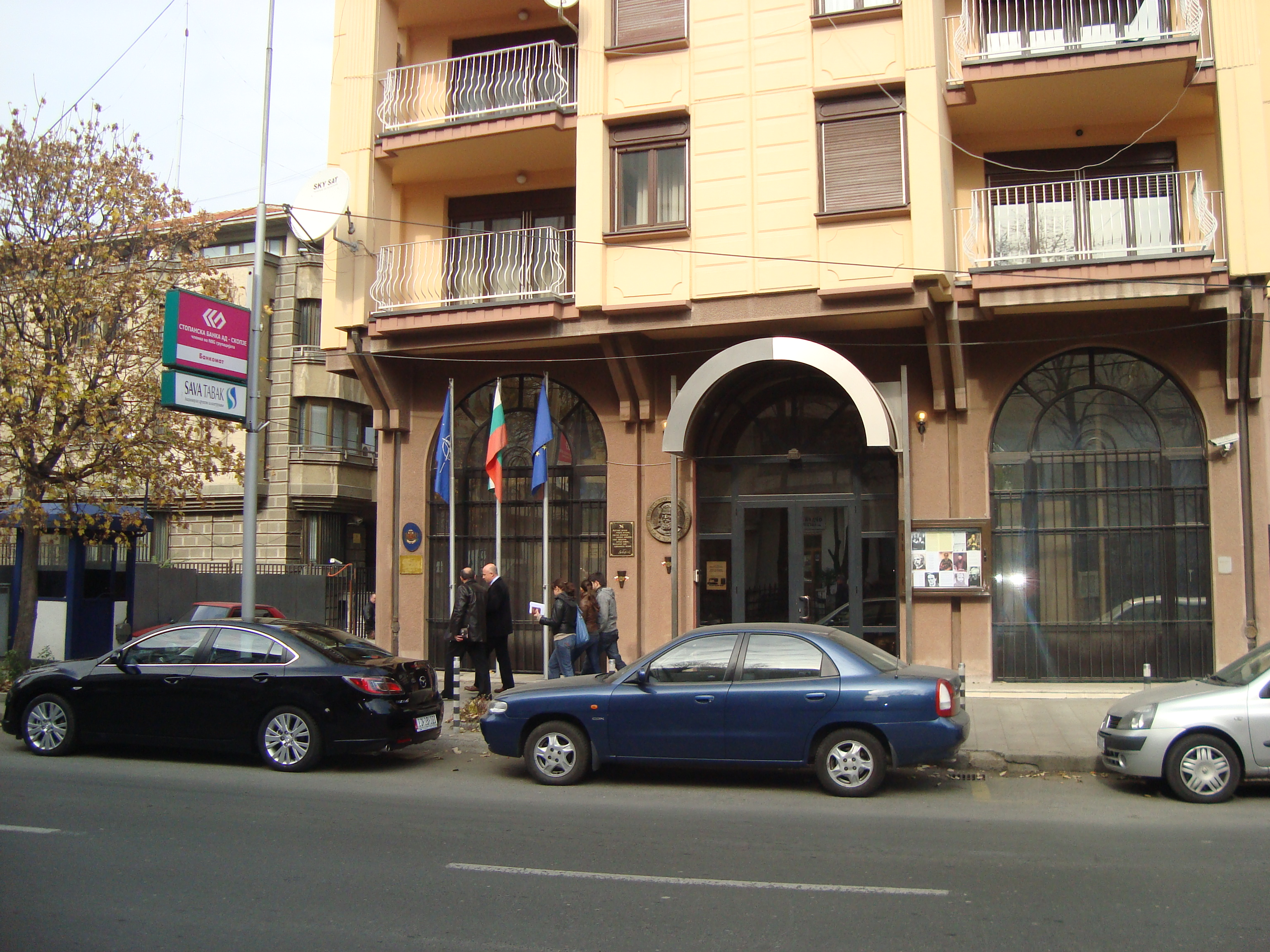
Embassy in Skopje

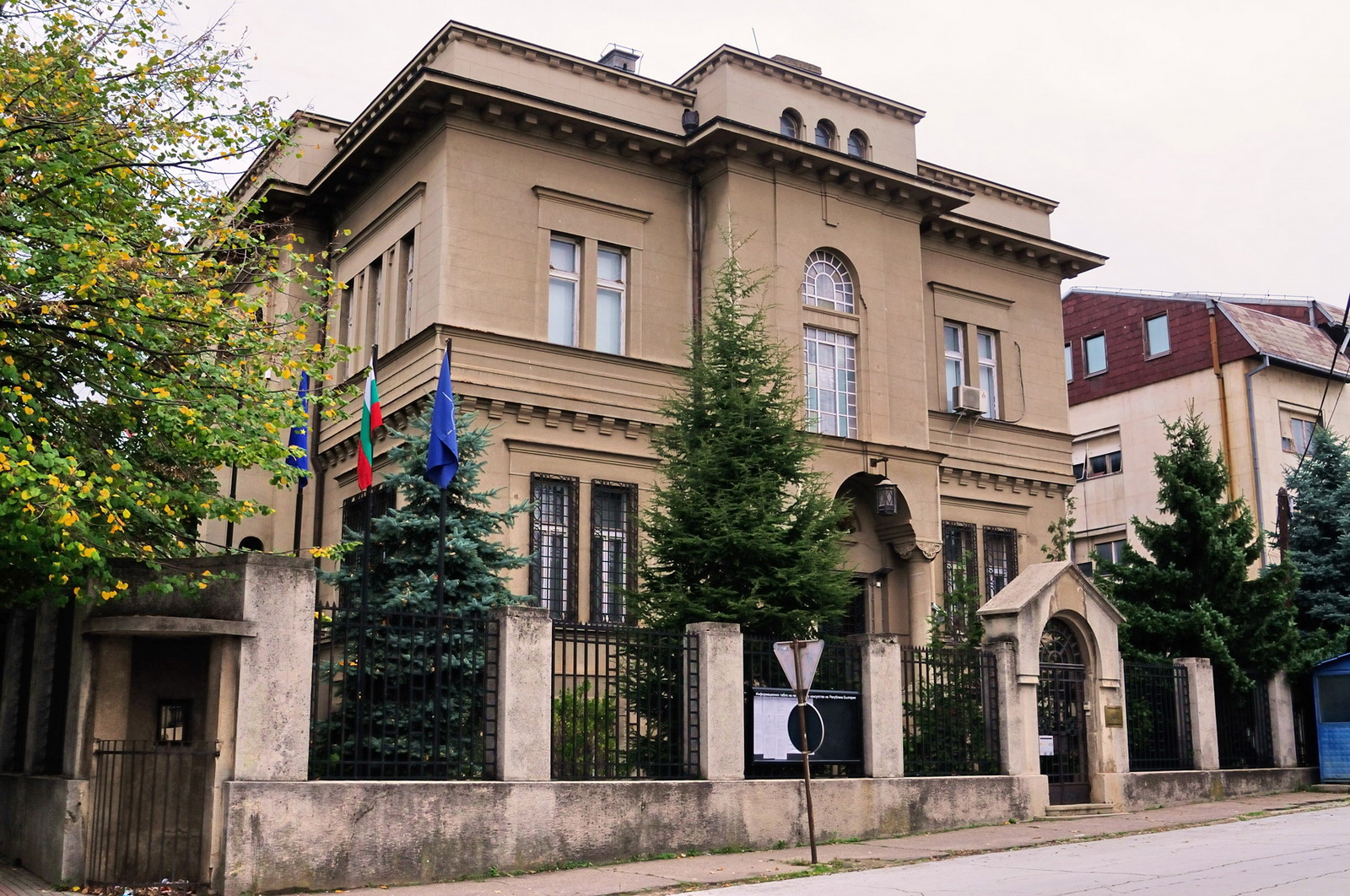
Consulate in Bitola

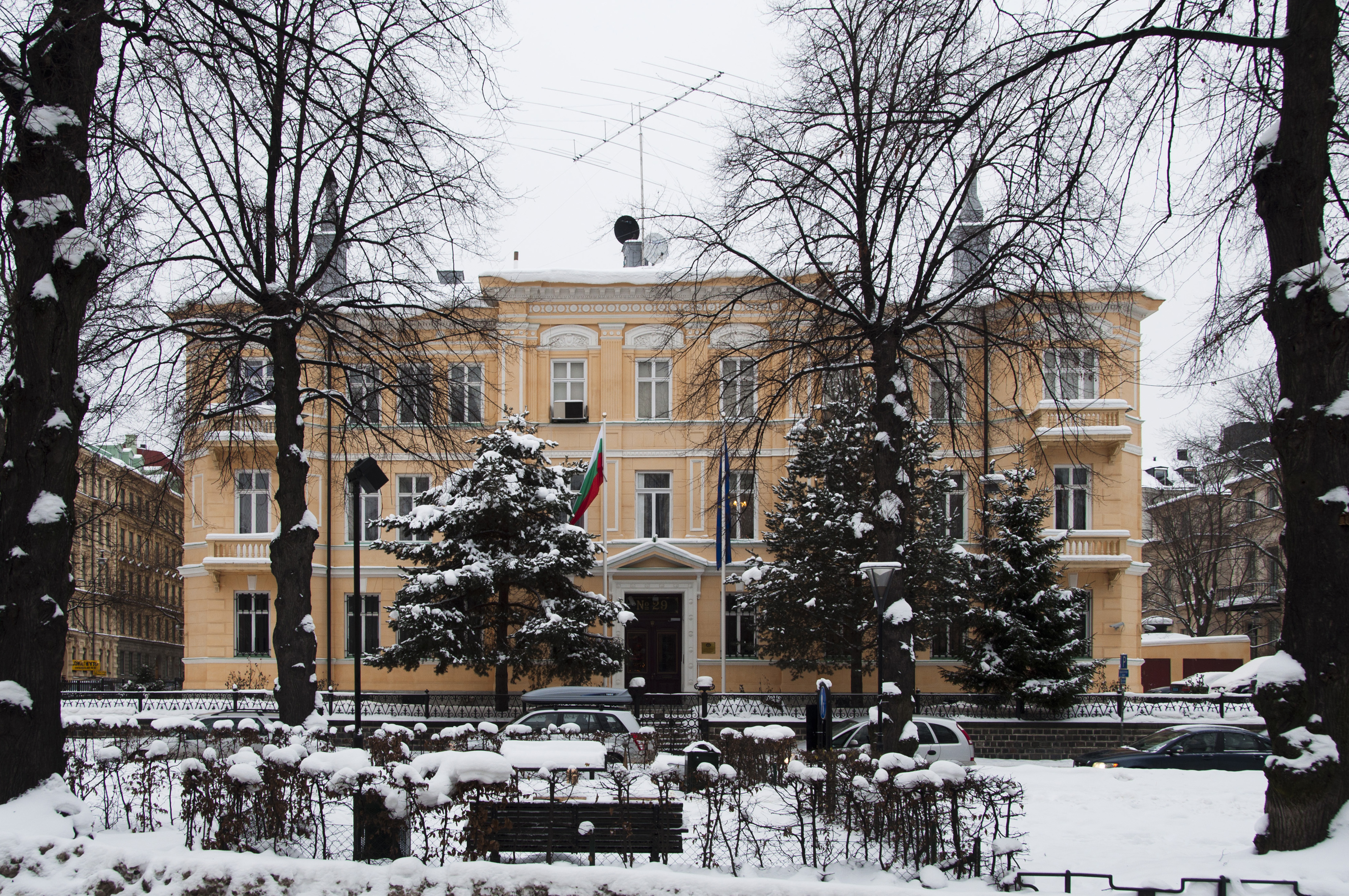
Embassy in Stockholm

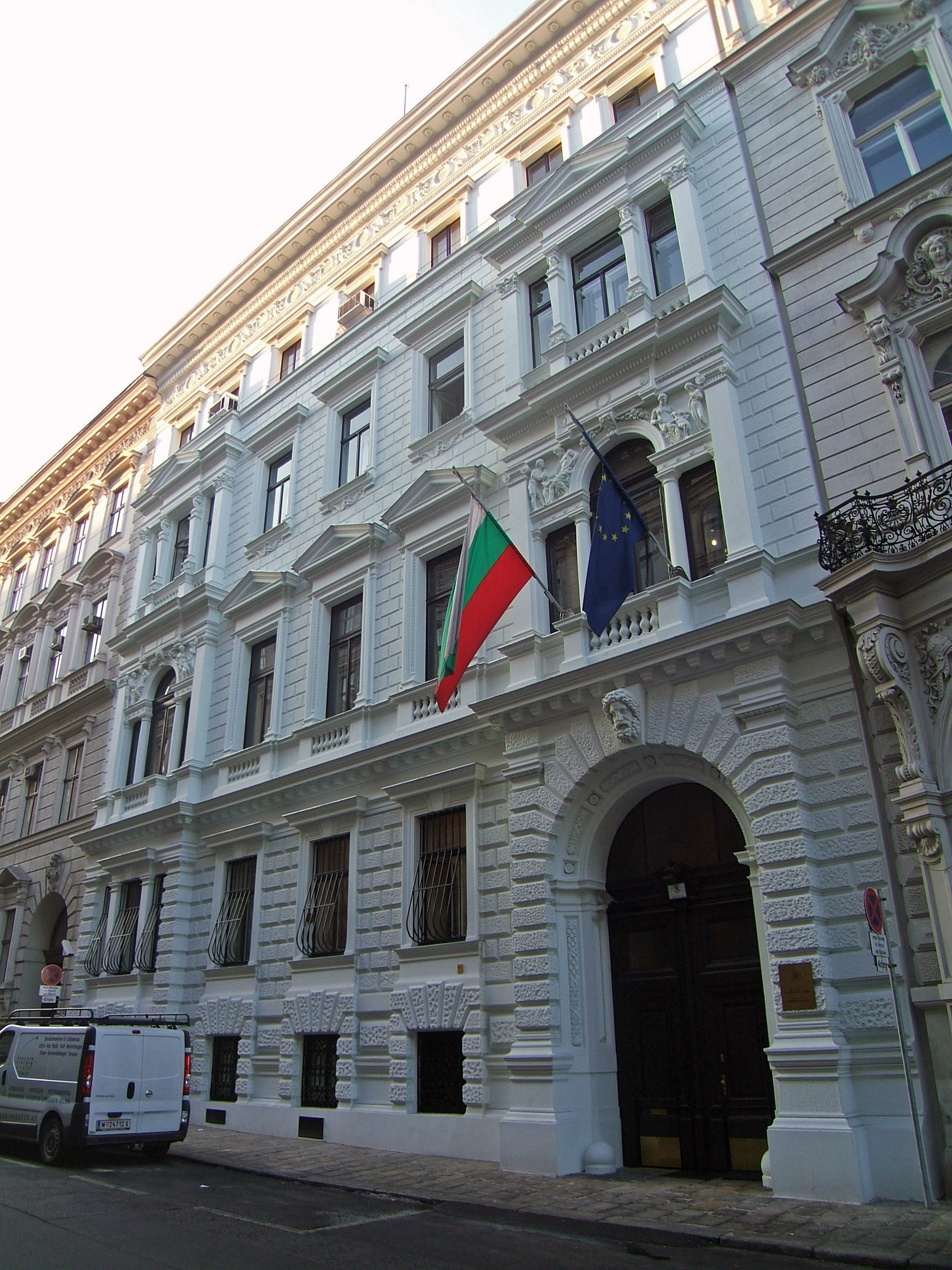
Embassy in Vienna

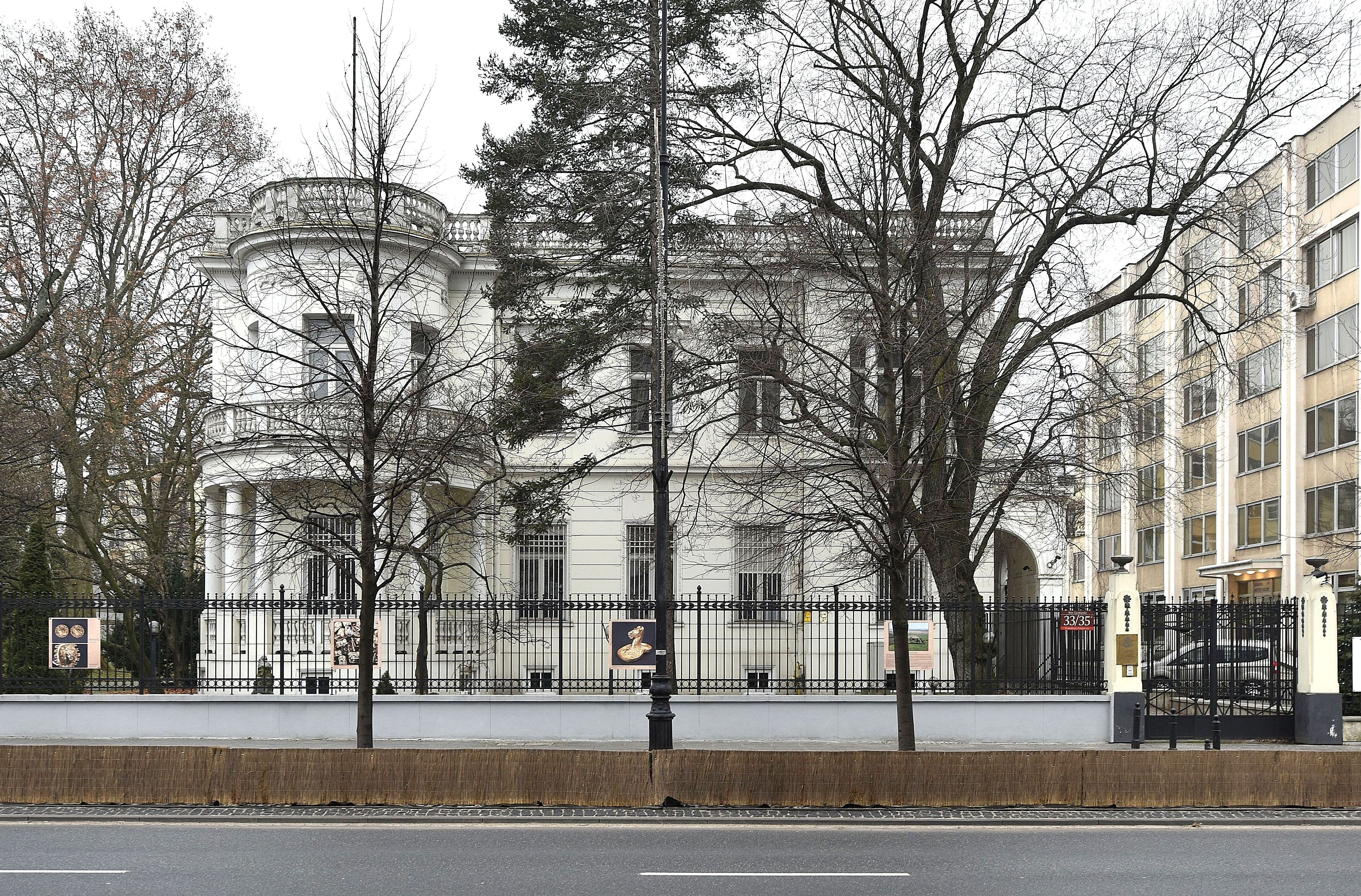
Embassy in Warsaw

=== Oceania ===
Host country	Host city	Mission	Concurrent accreditation	Ref.
Australia	Canberra	Embassy	Countries: Fiji; New Zealand; Papua New Guinea; Tonga; Vanuatu	

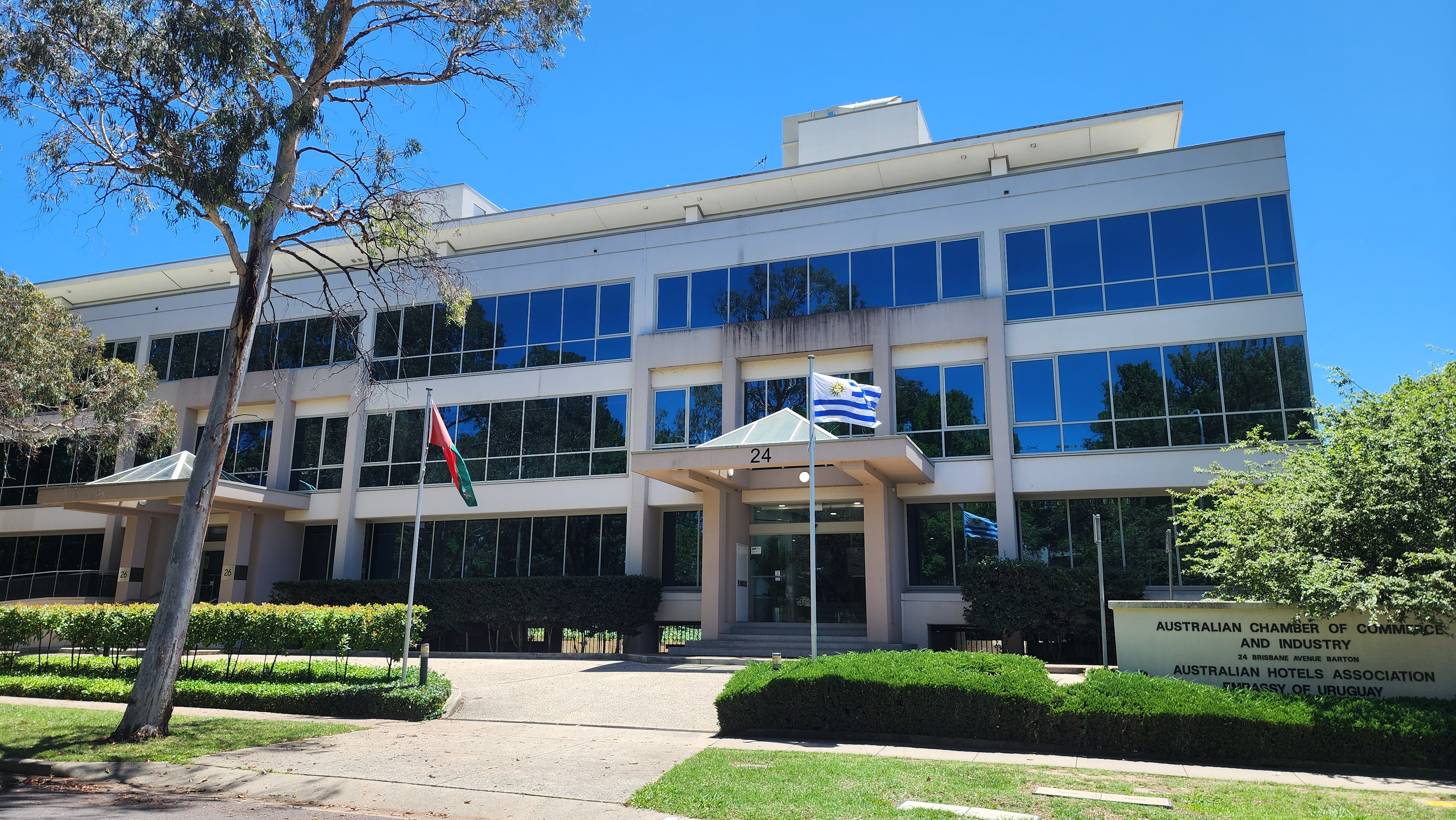
Embassy in Canberra

=== Multilateral organizations ===
Organization	Host city	Host country	Mission	Concurrent accreditation	Ref.
Council of Europe	Strasbourg	France	Permanent Representation		
European Union	Brussels	Belgium	Permanent Representation		
NATO	Brussels	Belgium	Permanent Delegation		
Food and Agriculture Organization	Rome	Italy	Permanent Mission	International Organizations: International Fund for Agricultural Development; World Food Programme	
United Nations	New York City	United States	Permanent Mission		
United Nations	Geneva	Switzerland	Permanent Mission	International Organizations: Conference on Disarmament; World Health Organization; World Intellectual Property Organization; World Trade Organization	
United Nations	Vienna	Austria	Permanent Mission	International Organizations: International Atomic Energy Agency; OSCE; UNIDO; United Nations Office on Drugs and Crime; UNCITRAL	
UNESCO	Paris	France	Permanent Mission		

== Closed missions ==
=== Africa ===
Host country	Host city	Mission	Year closed	Ref.
Angola	Luanda	Embassy	2011	
Ghana	Accra	Embassy	2011	
Kenya	Nairobi	Embassy	1990	
Libya	Benghazi	Consulate	2007	
Sudan	Khartoum	Embassy	2011	
Zimbabwe	Harare	Embassy	2011	

=== Americas ===
Host country	Host city	Mission	Year closed	Ref.
Colombia	Bogotá	Embassy	1998	
Ecuador	Quito	Embassy	1990	
Chile	Santiago de Chile	Embassy	2012	
Nicaragua	Managua	Embassy	1997	
Peru	Lima	Embassy	1998	
Uruguay	Montevideo	Embassy	1998	
Venezuela	Caracas	Embassy	2012	

=== Asia ===
Host country	Host city	Mission	Year closed	Ref.
Afghanistan	Kabul	Embassy	2018	
Bangladesh	Dhaka	Embassy	1992	
Cambodia	Phnom Penh	Embassy	2011	
Laos	Vientiane	Embassy	1991	
Philippines	Manila	Embassy	1991	
Singapore	Singapore	Embassy	Unknown	
Sri Lanka	Colombo	Embassy	1990	
Thailand	Bangkok	Embassy	2011	
Yemen	Sana'a	Embassy	2020	

=== Europe ===
Host country	Host city	Mission	Year closed	Ref.
Lithuania	Vilnius	Embassy	2011	

== See also ==
- List of diplomatic missions in Bulgaria
- Foreign relations of Bulgaria
