= Nimero =

Nimero is Bulgarian software company created in 2009. Its main product is Envision. The software allows interaction between students and teacher via one computer, one projector and multiple mice.

The company participated in multiple competitions such as:

- Start-up of the year, 2011, Bulgaria, 1st place
- Imagine Cup, UK, April 2010, 2nd place
- IBTEC worldwide finals, USA, November 2009
- NovaTechCEE finals, Israel, October 2009, 3rd place (participated with different name – MindPoint)
- NovaTech, Bulgaria, July 2009, 3rd place (participated with different name – MindPoint)
- Imagine Cup worldwide finals, Egypt, July 2009 (participated with different name – MindPoint)
- Imagine Cup, Bulgaria, May 2009, 1st place (participated with different name – MindPoint)

The software of the company is used in Bulgaria, the USA, Cyprus and Spain.

== See also ==
- Economy of Bulgaria
