= 1890s in Bulgaria =

The 1890s in the Principality of Bulgaria

== Incumbents ==
- Prince of Bulgaria: Ferdinand I (1887–1918)
- Prime Minister of Bulgaria:
  - Stefan Stambolov (1887–1894)
  - Konstantin Stoilov (1894–1899)
  - Dimitar Grekov (1899)
  - Todor Ivanchov (1899–1901)

== Events ==
=== 1890 ===
- The first opera company in Bulgaria is founded.
- 7 September – Parliamentary elections are held. The result is an overwhelming victory for the People's Liberal Party of Prime Minister Stefan Stambolov.

=== 1891 ===
- The Eagles' Bridge in Sofia is constructed by Czech architect Václav Prošek, his brother Jozef and his cousins Bohdan and Jiří. They also construct the Lions' Bridge.
- The Young Macedonian Literary Association is established.
- 2 August – The Buzludzha Congress begins at Buzludzha, resulting in the founding of the Bulgarian Social Democratic Party.

=== 1892 ===
- Bolyarka, a Bulgarian beer brand from the city of Veliko Tarnovo, is founded by the HadjiSlavchevi brothers.
- 25 July – The Navibulgar shipping company is founded.

=== 1893 ===
- 30 July – Parliamentary elections are held.

=== 1894 ===
- 23 September – Parliamentary elections are held. Voter turnout is unusually high.

=== 1895 ===
- The Macedonian Secret Revolutionary Committee (MSRC) is founded in Plovdiv.
- The Supreme Macedonian Committee chetas' action takes place.
- The Macedonian Secret Revolutionary Committee is established.
- The Supreme Macedonian-Adrianople Committee is established.

=== 1896 ===
- Bulgaria sends one athlete, Swiss gymnast Charles Champaud, to the inaugural 1896 Summer Olympics.
- The Democratic Party is founded.
- The National Academy of Art is founded.
- The Strandzha is founded.
- 29 November – Parliamentary elections are held in the country. The elections are marred by disturbances, particularly in Sofia. The elections are won by the ruling party (the People's Party) led by Prime Minister Konstantin Stoilov.

=== 1897 ===
- Sucreries Raffineries Bulgares becomes active.

=== 1898 ===
- The Bulgarian News Agency is founded.
- The first Rozhen National Folklore Fair is held.

=== 1899 ===
- 30 January – Dimitar Grekov is appointed as Prime Minister of Bulgaria by King Ferdinand I, but removed from office less than 10 months later on October 13.
- 25 April – The Liberal Party wins 89 of the 169 seats in the parliament following parliamentary elections. Voter turnout is 49.5%.

== Deaths ==
- 1895
  - 18 July – Stefan Stambolov, former Prime Minister and regent of Bulgaria (born 1854)

== See also ==
- History of Bulgaria
- Timeline of Bulgarian history
