= 1940s in Bulgaria =

The 1940s in the Kingdom of Bulgaria (until 1946) and the People's Republic of Bulgaria (from 1946).

== Incumbents ==
=== Kingdom of Bulgaria ===
- Tsar of Bulgaria:
  - Boris III (1918–1943)
  - Simeon II (1943–1946)
- Regent:
  - Kiril, Prince of Preslav (1943–1944)
  - Bogdan Filov (1943–1944)
  - Nikola Mihov (1943–1944)
  - Todor Pavlov (1944–1946)
  - Venelin Ganev (1944–1946)
  - Tsvetko Boboshevski (1944–1946)
- Prime Minister of Bulgaria:
  - Georgi Kyoseivanov (1935–1940)
  - Bogdan Filiov (1940–1943)
  - Petar Gabrovski (acting, 1943)
  - Dobri Bozhilov (1943–1944)
  - Ivan Bagrianov (1944)
  - Konstantin Muraviev (1944)
  - Kimon Georgiev (1944–1946)

=== People's Republic of Bulgaria ===
- General Secretary of the Bulgarian Communist Party:
  - Georgi Dimitrov (1948–1949)
  - Valko Chervenkov (1949–1954)
- Chairman of the Provisional Presidency: Vasil Kolarov (1946–1947)
- Chairman of the Presidium: Mincho Neychev (1947–1950)
- Prime Minister of Bulgaria:
  - Kimon Georgiev (1946)
  - Georgi Dimitrov (1946–1949)
  - Vasil Kolarov (1949–1950)

== Events ==
=== 1940 ===
- 7 September – Bulgaria regained control of Southern Dobruja under the Treaty of Craiova.
- 14 December – Shipwreck of the Salvador, a ship carrying Jewish refugees to Palestine, in the Sea of Marmara. 230 of the 326 passengers died in the wreck.
- 24 December – The Law for the Protection of the Nation, an anti-Jewish racial law which included banning Jews from having Bulgarian citizenship, was ratified.

=== 1941 ===
- March 1 – Bulgaria joined the Axis.

=== 1942 ===
- June 5 – The United States declared war on Bulgaria following the latter's joined of the Axis bloc the previous year.

=== 1943 ===
- December 10 – The allies conduct bombing raids over Sofia.

=== 1944 ===
- August 26 – Bulgaria officially withdraws from World War II.
- September 8 - Soviet forces cross the border. They occupy the north-eastern part of Bulgaria along with the key port cities of Varna and Burgas by the next day. By order of the government, the Bulgarian Army offers no resistance.

=== 1945 ===
- 18 November – Parliamentary elections were held in Bulgaria.
- 21 July – The University of Ruse was founded.

=== 1946 ===
- 8 September – A referendum was held in Bulgaria on whether to become a republic. The result were unanimously in favour of the change, with 95.6% supporting and with 91.7% voter turnout.
- 31 December – The 1946 Bulgarian census.

=== 1947 ===
- Bulgaria's second constitution, the Dimitrov Constitution, came into effect. It was later replaced by the Zhivkov Constitution in 1971.

=== 1948 ===
- 6 January – Balkantourist (the oldest still running Bulgarian tour operator) is established.

=== 1949 ===
- 18 December – Parliamentary elections were held in Bulgaria.

== Births ==
- 1940
  - 2 July – Georgi Ivan Ivanov, first Bulgarian in space.
  - 8 December – Alexander Yossifov, composer and conductor.

== Deaths ==
- 1940
  - 23 March – Dimitar Stanchov, 15th Prime Minister of Bulgaria (b. 1863)
  - 10 September – Nikola Ivanov, Bulgarian general (b. 1861)
  - 23 December – Mariyka Popova, actress (b. 1866).

== See also ==
- Bulgaria during World War II
- History of Bulgaria
- Timeline of Bulgarian history
