= 1900s in Bulgaria =

The 1900s in the Principality of Bulgaria (until 1908) and the Kingdom of Bulgaria (from 1908).

== Incumbents ==
- Prince of Bulgaria: Ferdinand I (1887–1908)
- Tsar of Bulgaria: Ferdinand I (1908–1918)
- Prime Minister of Bulgaria:
  - Todor Ivanchov (1899–1901)
  - Racho Petrov (1901)
  - Petko Karavelov (1901–1902)
  - Stoyan Danev (1902–1903)
  - Racho Petrov (1903–1906)
  - Dimitar Petkov (1906–1907)
  - Dimitar Stanchov (1907, acting)
  - Petar Gudev (1907–1908)
  - Aleksandar Malinov (1908–1911)

== Events ==
=== 1900 ===
- 1899–1900 peasant unrest in Bulgaria.

=== 1901 ===
- The Miss Stone Affair when an American and a Bulgarian are kidnapped by the Internal Macedonian Revolutionary Organization.
- 28 January – Parliamentary elections are held in the country. Despite receiving only the third highest number of votes, the Progressive Liberal Party emerges as the largest party in Parliament with 40 of the 164 seats. Voter turnout is 42.7%.
- 16 February – Macedonian demonstrators in Sofia demand independence from Turkey.

=== 1902 ===
- The Zagorka brand of beer is created.
- 17 February – The Progressive Liberal Party wins 89 of the 189 seats in the parliament following parliamentary elections. Voter turnout is 49.8%.

=== 1903 ===
- August–October – The Ilinden–Preobrazhenie Uprising occurs against the Ottoman Empire in the Balkans.
- 19 August – The Strandzha Commune is established.
- 7 September – The Strandzha Commune is disestablished.
- 19 October – The People's Party wins 134 of the 169 seats in the parliament following parliamentary elections. Voter turnout is 41.2%.

=== 1904 ===
- The First School of Higher Education is renamed Sofia University.
- The Ivan Vazov National Theatre is founded.
- 31 March – The Treaty of Sofia is signed between the Principality of Bulgaria and Kingdom of Serbia.
- 4 April – The 1904 Kresna earthquakes occur, resulting in the deaths of 200 people.
- August – The Free Trade Unions is established.

=== 1905 ===
- 5 October – The Old High School of Music in Ruse is inaugurated.

=== 1906 ===
- 20 April – The Vazduhoplavatelno Otdelenie (roughly translated as Aviation Squad) is created. This was the earliest version of the modern Bulgarian Air Force.
- The Church of the Assumption, previously a mosque, is consecrated as a church.

=== 1907 ===
- The Varna Shipyard is founded.
- Skobelev Park is founded.
- 30 August – The Monument to the Tsar Liberator is inaugurated.

=== 1908 ===
- 25 May – The Democratic Party wins 166 of the 203 seats in the parliament following parliamentary elections. Voter turnout is 50.2%.
- 7 September – The Bulgarian Constitutional Clubs is founded.
- 5 October – The Principality of Bulgaria declares independence as the Kingdom of Bulgaria.

=== 1909 ===
- FC 13, a football club based in Sofia, is established.

== See also ==
- History of Bulgaria
- Timeline of Bulgarian history
