= 2002 in Bulgaria =

- Decades: 1980s; 1990s; 2000s; 2010s; 2020s
- See also: Other events of 2002; Timeline of Bulgarian history

Events in the year 2002 in Bulgaria.

== Incumbents ==
- President: Georgi Parvanov
- Prime Minister: Simeon Sakskoburggotski
- Speaker: Ognyan Gerdzhikov

== Events ==
- 14 January – Bulgaria competed at the 2002 Winter Olympics in Salt Lake City, United States, winning one silver and two bronze medals.

== Deaths ==
- 28 December – Georgi Rikov, Bulgarian linguist and scientist (born 1946)
