= Marek Stachowski =

Marek Stachowski may refer to:

- Marek Stachowski (composer)
- Marek Stachowski (linguist)
