= 1920s in Bulgaria =

The 1920s in the Kingdom of Bulgaria.

== Incumbents ==
- Tsar of Bulgaria: Boris III (1918–1943)
- Prime Minister of Bulgaria:
  - Aleksandar Stamboliyski (1919–1923)
  - Aleksandar Tsankov (1923–1926)
  - Andrey Lyapchev (1926–1931)

== Events ==
=== 1920 ===
- 28 March – The Bulgarian Agrarian National Union won 110 of the 229 seats in the parliament following parliamentary elections. Voter turnout was 77.3%.

=== 1921 ===
- The Macedonian Federative Organization (MFO) was established in Sofia by former Internal Macedonian Revolutionary Organization (IMRO) left wing's activists.
- The first organized football championship is held in Sofia.

=== 1922 ===
- 19 November – A referendum on the prosecution of war criminals was held and approved by 74.33% of voters.
- 23 February 1922 Lord Newton had given Notice to ask if the Supreme Council are still insisting upon the formation of voluntary Armies in Bulgaria and Hungary in spite of the excessive additional expenditure involved and the difficulty of obtaining recruits.

=== 1923 ===
- 22 April – The Bulgarian Agrarian National Union won 212 of the 245 seats in the parliament following parliamentary elections. Voter turnout was 86.5%.
- 9 June – 1923 Bulgarian coup d'état
- June Uprising
- September Uprising
- November 1923 Bulgarian parliamentary election

=== 1924 ===
- January – State Protection Act
- 27 July – A Greek officer killed 17 Bulgarian peasants at Tarlis (present-day Vathytopos), a mountainous village in the Kato Nevrokopi region near the Greco-Bulgarian border.

=== 1925 ===
- 14 April – King Boris III of Bulgaria escapes an assassination attempt by armed anarchists while being driven through the Arabakonak Pass.
- 16 April – St Nedelya Church assault: A church in Sofia is damaged by an explosion set by Bulgarian Communists during the funeral of General Konstantin Georgiev. Two hundred people are killed.
- 30 August – The 1925 Bulgarian State Football Championship is won by SC Vladislav Varna.
- 19 October – Incident at Petrich: Near the Bulgarian town of Petrich on the border with Greece, a Greek soldier is shot. One theory is that a Greek soldier was running across the border after his dog, thus the incident is sometimes called "The War of the Stray Dog".

=== 1926 ===
- The first men's event of the Bulgarian Athletics Championships was held.

=== 1927 ===
- 29 May – Parliamentary elections were held in Bulgaria.

=== 1928 ===
- The 1928 Chirpan–Plovdiv earthquakes kills at least 114 people.
- The Sofia Philharmonic was founded.
- August 20 – The Yunak Stadium was opened.

=== 1929 ===
- FC Balkan Botevgrad, a Bulgarian football club, was established under the name "Stamen Panchev".

== Births ==
- 1920
  - Robert Lynn, Bulgarian born American businessman and cofounder of DHL
- 1925
  - 15 January – Georgi Kaloyanchev, actor (died 2012)
  - 3 April – Duke Ferdinand Eugen of Württemberg, first child of Princess Nadezhda of Bulgaria and her husband Duke Albrecht Eugen of Württemberg
  - 10 April – Dobromir Tashkov, footballer (died 2017)
- 1928
  - 7 May - Georgi Rusev, actor (died 2011)
- 1929
  - 1 March - Georgi Markov, writer (died 1978)

== Deaths ==
- 1925
  - 16 April – Stefan Nerezov, military leader, 57 (killed in the St Nedelya Church assault)
- 1929
  - 21 October – Vasil Radoslavov, Bulgarian liberal politician (b. 1854)

== See also ==
- History of Bulgaria
- Timeline of Bulgarian history
