= 2000 in Bulgaria =

- Decades: 1980s; 1990s; 2000s; 2010s; 2020s
- See also: Other events of 2000; Timeline of Bulgarian history

This is a list of events that occurred in the year 2000 in Bulgaria.

== Incumbents ==
- President: Petar Stoyanov
- Vice President: Todor Kavaldzhiev
- Prime Minister: Simeon Sakskoburggotski

== Events ==
- 13 May - first murder committed by serial killers Ludwig Tolumov and Ivan Serafimov
- 31 October - the Serdika Metro Station opens in Sofia

== Sports ==
- 31 May - 2000 Bulgarian Cup Final

== Births ==
- April 7 - Ivan Ivanov, singer and songwriter

== Deaths ==
- 3 April - Milko Bobotsov, chess grandmaster
