= Football in Sofia =

Map showing the locations of Sofia's four largest clubs (red), the two smaller teams, which have at times been promoted to the top flight (yellow), as well as the national stadium (blue).

Football is the most popular sport in Sofia, the capital of Bulgaria. Sofia was the first city in the country to have an organized football championship, which was created in 1921. Teams from Sofia have been crowned national champions on 70 occasions in the 90 seasons between 1924 and 2013. As of the late 20th and early 21st centuries, there are four teams from Sofia which have been constant participants in the top national division – Levski, CSKA, Slavia and Lokomotiv. All four have managed to reach the latter stages of European competitions on several occasions, the best of which are CSKA's two European Cup semi-finals in 1967 and 1982, and Slavia's Cup Winners' Cup semi-final in 1967.

== History ==
Football has been played in Sofia as an organized sport since 1921, with some clubs having been founded more than a decade earlier. The Sofia Regional Sports Organization (SOSO) oversaw the running of the Sofia Sports League (SSL), until the creation of the national championship in 1948. The number of divisions in the Sofia league varied over the years and, in the early 1940s, reached a maximum of six divisions, with 43 teams competing in this "Organized" league system. Aside from them, there were dozens of so-called "Unorganized" teams playing outside this league in the Bulgarian capital, which at the time had a population of between 150 000 (1920) and half a million (1946) people.

The history of Sofia football follows the political life of Bulgaria, with all major upheavals having both direct and indirect effects on the shape and character of the clubs and their players. This history can be split into three broad periods, all of which are themselves subdivided into smaller sections. The three main periods are – the early 1900s–1944, during the Kingdom of Bulgaria; 1944–1989 during the communist People's Republic of Bulgaria; and 1989 to the present, during the so-called "Transition" ^{(bg)}.

=== The early years, 1900s–1944 ===
Organized sport did not develop in Bulgaria until the very end of the 19th century, as the country had only recently gained autonomy within the Ottoman Empire, in 1878. The earliest sports organizations began appearing as gymnastic societies, the most famous of which was the Yunak Gymnastic Society, founded in 1895. Football, if it featured at all, was merely one of many sports practiced at these societies. The very first specially oriented football clubs were formed towards the end of the first decade of the twentieth century, and did not begin officially registering themselves as such until several years later. Even then, most did not refer to themselves as football clubs, but rather as sports clubs, and the very first among them had the actual words "Football Club" or "Sports Club" as their official name – examples include Sofia's FK13, originally simply "Futbol Klub" (est. 1909, registered 1913), and Atletik, originally simply "Klub Futbol" (est. 1910, reg. 1913); later clubs were "Sportklub" (est. 1920), and "Sportist" ("Sportsman", est. 1923).

The first organized football match in the Sofia Sports League was played on 8 Sept 1921 between Sportklub and Pobeda, and ended with a 6–1 win for Sportklub. The SSL began in 1921 with ten teams, and gradually expanded until there were 23 teams playing in four divisions in 1926. Aside from a temporary split in the very first season, which led to the short-lived Sofia Sports Union (SSS) in 1922–23, the SSL was the sole organized league system in the city until it was disbanded in 1944.

In 1923, the Bulgarian National Sports Federation (BNSF) was created, which began organizing the national championship. As of the summer of 1924, this was held as a knock-out tournament at the end of each season, with the participation of all of the regional champions. The first edition was not completed, with SC Levski losing in the final to Vladislav Varna in 1925, and SC Slavia being the first Sofia team to win it, in 1928. Slavia were national champions on six occasions before 1945, Levski on three, and ZhSK and Vladislav Varna twice each.

In 1926, the first citywide knock-out tournament was created in Sofia, the Ulpia Serdica Cup, which existed until 1942. Levski won this cup four times and then boycotted it, after the club was not allowed to keep the trophy, as the rules stipulated.

A small series of changes occurred in club organization following the assassination attempt on the Tsar during the Sveta Nedelya bombing in 1925. A much wider-reaching wave of changes occurred ten years later, following the coup d'état by the Zveno organization in 1934, and the subsequent counter-coup by Tsar Boris a few months later, in 1935. Following this series of political upheavals, many small Sofia clubs were merged into larger ones, or else they underwent temporary or permanent name changes, depending on the political affiliations of their members.

In 1937, the BNSF decided to replace the knock-out format of the national championship with a new National Division, which contained 10 teams. Four of these were from Sofia, which therefore left the SSL in order to participate nationally. The National Division existed for three seasons and, when it was disbanded, the Sofia teams from it returned to play in the capital, forming the "Sofia Regional Division". This was a sort of "Sofia Premiership", which sat above the Sofia 1st Division.

After the creation of the national league in 1937, a new nationwide knockout competition was created. This cup tournament ran between 1938 and 1942, and on all 5 occasions was won by teams from Sofia, with FK13 winning it twice.

Several amalgamations also occurred during the war, such as "Sportklub–Sredets", formed in 1942 from the amalgamation of Sportklub with two smaller clubs – the municipal workers' Sredets (est. 1936) and the Armenian émigrés' club Homentmen (est. 1918), which existed for two years until the Soviet Army entered Bulgaria in late 1944.

After the communist takeover in 1944, the number of teams in Sofia was drastically slashed through forced mergers, with the number of organized clubs dropping from 29 teams in 5 divisions in 1944 to 14 teams in 2 divisions in 1945. Over the following five years, the entire history of football in Sofia was effectively erased and started afresh with newly named and differently organized sports teams.

During the entire pre-communist period (1921–1944), the most successful club in Bulgaria was Slavia Sofia, with six national championships and 11 Sofia championships, followed by Levski, with five national and 8 Sofia championships. The next best teams in the Sofia championship were – Sportklub and ZhSK (once national and once Sofia champions each), AS23 (twice Sofia champions), FK13 (once), and Shipka (one national cup and one Ulpia Serdika cup winners). Other consistently strong teams, but which never won any major competitions, are Botev, Benkovski and Rakovski.

=== The socialist period, 1944–1989 ===
When the communist regime took over in September 1944, they implemented many changes in the Bulgarian sports scene. One of the immediate effects in Sofia was that many clubs immediately began to be renamed, merged, their boards of directors rearranged, and their assets transferred to the new entities (see below for details). One example is the team Knyaz Kiril, which, in the days immediately following the beginning of communist rule, was initially renamed Fatherland Front, a month later this was changed to Poshtenski SK ("Post Office SC"), before being merged into Levski under the name PSK–Levski. Teams stopped being called "sports clubs", and rather began being referred to as "people's physical culture associations" – narodno fizkulturno druzhestvo, or NFD.

The DSO period – 1949–57

The most dramatic change occurred in 1949, when the country's entire sports structure was overhauled. On 19 Sept 1949, a decision was taken by the communist party that all sport in the country would be arranged into six national "Voluntary Sporting Organizations" (dobrovolna sportna organizatsiya, or DSO), set up along professional lines, following the model already extant in the Soviet Union. Thus, people would only be allowed to train within their respective industry-relevant DSO – so, for example, people working in light industry would have to go and train at the DSO Dinamo facilities, while people working in heavy industry would train at DSO Torpedo. Since the DSOs took over not only the assets but also the first-team players of the clubs they inherited, this meant that all of the players also received honorary jobs within the respective industry, and received their wages not through their DSO, but from the factory in which they were registered as workers, thus officially still remaining amateur players.

Since each town and city nationwide had the same DSOs, this meant that there was, e.g. – a Torpedo Sofia (which was a merger of Lokomotiv and three other clubs from northern Sofia); a Torpedo Plovdiv (which merged Lokomotiv Plovdiv and Sportklub Plovdiv); a Torpedo Pleven (which was a continuation of Belite Orli Pleven and several other clubs), and so on. The situation in Sofia was slightly more complex than in other cities – due to the many clubs which had existed prior to the mergers, the capital had one extra DSO, arguably its largest, at least in terms of the number of teams that it had taken over. This was DSO Septemvri, which was an amalgamation of Sportklub Sofia, Botev Sofia, and at least six other clubs. As well as these seven DSOs, there was also an eighth sports organization in the capital – that of the armed forces, which were outside the DSO structure. While all cities had army teams, before the start of the 1950 season the army decided that Sofia's CSKA (then "CDNV") would take the best players from the whole country, and all other cities' army teams would be sent to the lower divisions. During the 8 years that the DSO structure existed, the championship stayed in Sofia, with the most successful team being CDNV, later CDNA, which won six championships, followed by DSO Dinamo, which took the other two. No team from outside Sofia even came runner-up during this time.

As part of the destalinization era, the DSOs were disbanded in 1957. The main change was that the teams, which were now referred to as "associations for physical culture and sport" (druzhestvo za fizkultura i sport, or DFS), would now be organized on a territorial, rather than a professional basis – i.e. people had to train wherever their nearest DFS was located. The other major change was that most DFSs took on the names of their most successful pre-1944 predecessor. Thus DSO Dinamo became DFS Levski, while DSO Udarnik became DFS Slavia.

The post-Prague Spring period

A third wave of major changes during the communist era came after the 1969 Warsaw Pact invasion of Czechoslovakia, which ended the Prague Spring. This led to a wide-reaching reorganization within the entire Eastern Bloc, which also drastically affected sport. In Bulgaria, this meant yet another wave of mergers, with Sofia's six strongest teams being reduced to three – CSKA-Cherveno Zname merged with DFS Septemvri to form CSKA–Septemvriysko zname ("CSKA–September flag"); Levski and the Interior Ministry-sponsored Spartak merged to form Levski–Spartak; and Slavia and Lokomotiv merged into ZhSK–Slavia. Due to major lobbying by the fans, however, this last DFS was split up again two years later, which was an unprecedented development. This structure of four major teams in Sofia, created in 1969–71, remains to this day.

A major event in Sofia (and Bulgarian) football as a whole took place during the 1985 Soviet Cup final between CSKA-Septemvriysko zname and Levski-Spartak. After a tense match with several minor skirmishes between players, the communist party decided to disband the two teams, and re-formed them under different names – respectively Sredets (the former name of Sofia) and Vitosha (the name of the mountain to the south of the capital). Many of the players which went on to make up Bulgaria's 1994 World Cup squad were playing in this match and received lifetime bans, which were lifted over the following years. They changed back to their original names in a matter of weeks after the internal party coup of November 1989.

The most successful team in Bulgaria by far during the communist period is CSKA, under its various appellations. They won 25 championships during this 45-year period and came runners-up 11 times. They are followed by Dinamo/Levski/Levski-Spartak/Vitosha (who generally mirrored CSKA in the top two spots). The other successful Sofia teams are Lokomotiv (national champions twice, three Soviet cups) and Stroitel/Udarnik/Slavia (six Soviet Cups, but only ever runners-up in the league, on six occasions). Akademik Sofia (originally the higher education DSO) had a strong period during the 1970s, managing to come third twice and even play in Europe. Three other Sofia teams made brief appearances in the national division – Zavod 12 (three seasons, finished 4th in 1954), Septemvri (2 seasons, 5th in 1961) and the air force's VVS (2 seasons, 8th in 1955).

=== The democratic period, post-1989 ===
After the fall of communism, all of the clubs, until then state-owned, became private companies, with those playing in the top two divisions taking on names beginning with "PFC" ("professional football club").

The 1990s was a chaotic period with falling attendances and little investment in the sport and, due to business differences among shareholders, a situation often arose with splits and resulting in several teams often claiming to be the "real" club from a given town; or else of owners of more than one club "swapping" these between leagues. Thus, for example, in the 2008–09 season, a team called "Akademik" played in Division B, while another called AFC Akademik played in the Sofia Regional division. A more satirical situation occurred during the 2006–07 season, when the owner of Chernomorets Burgas bought the Sofia team Conegliano German and renamed it "Chernomorets Burgas Sofia" ("Chernomorets" means "of the Black Sea"). They made an increasingly strong presence in Division A competition and overshadowed the original Chernomorets Burgas who were in Division B; they never mutually competed.

As of the 2012–13 season, the most successful post-1989 club in Bulgaria is Levski, with 9 championships, followed by CSKA with 5. As of the 2013–14 season, aside from the four big clubs in the A PFG, the only other club in the city in the top three flights is Septemvri, in the V AFG. Even though Akademik played in the A PFG in 2010–11, they are now out of professional football. Below the amateur 3rd division is the Sofia regional division, made up entirely of local teams.

== Teams ==
Here is a summary of the main teams in Sofia over the years –

=== Early period ===
- Slavia – established 1913 in the southwestern part of central Sofia after the merger of two local teams – Botev (est. 1909) and Razvitie (est. 1910). 7 times national champions; 10 times Sofia champions; once local (Ulpia Serdica) cup winners. Colours – all-white.
- Levski – established 1914 in the southeast part of central Sofia. 3 times national champions; 8 times Sofia champions; three times national knock-out competition (Tsar's Cup) winners; four times local (Ulpia Serdica) cup winners. Originally played in red and yellow with black shorts, later in all blue.
- AS23 – formed in east-central Sofia after the merger of Atletik (est. 1910), Slava (est. 1916) and Officers' Sports Club (est. 1919). AS23 was the club of the tsar's army, and many of the players were acting officers. Once national champions, twice Sofia champions, once national cup and once local cup winners. Played in white shirts with large black collars and black shorts.
- FK13 – established 1909 in central Sofia, registered in 1913 as "Fulbol Klub", which was their official name until 1924. Known as "the Veterans" due to their long history, they were once Sofia champions and twice Tsar's Cup winners. They played in red and black stripes and black shorts.
- Shipka – established 1923 as Sparta in what was then eastern Sofia after the merger of two local teams – Pobeda (est. 1919) and Mephisto (est. 1920). The name was changed to Shipka a year later after special permission was granted by the war veterans from the Battle of Shipka Pass half a century earlier. Shipka won the national cup and local cup once each. Played in claret shirts with large white sky blue collars and white shorts.
- Sportklub – established in 1920 in south-central Sofia. They were originally formed in 1912 as Karavelov, but were merged into Slavia two years later, before being reestablished as the separate Sportklub in 1920. A couple of smaller clubs were later merged into it in 1942 – the municipal workers' Sredets (est. 1936) and the Armenian community's club Homentmen (est. 1918), to form Sportklub–Sredets. Local and national champions once. Played in purple shirts and white shorts.
- ZhSK – established in 1929 as Zheleznicharski Sporten Klub, or Railworkers' Sports Club, in northern Sofia. Promoted to the top flight in Sofia for the first time in 1938, they became national champions two years later. Played in all black.
- Botev – established in 1919 in what was then west Sofia. Several clubs merged into Botev over the years but the name was always retained. Botev never won a major trophy, save the Sofia league once, when the stronger clubs were playing in the national division. Botev played in red shirts and white shorts and were known as "the Red Devils".
- Benkovski – established 1919 in what was then north Sofia from the merger of three local clubs – Orel, Vihar and Spartak. In 1926, Benkovski merged with local clubs Diana (est. 1923) and Sokol (est. 1919), but the latter split off again several years later. Benkovski originally played in white shirts with a wide horizontal navy stripe, later with navy shirts and black shorts.
- Rakovski – established in 1907 as Iskra Gymnastic Society, registered as Rakovski in 1911 in what was then south Sofia. While it "yo-yo’ed" between the top two divisions, Rakovski was the only other team in Sofia, aside from the above-mentioned, that was a regular participant in the top flight in the interwar years. Rakovski played in navy shirts and black shorts.

Throughout most of this period, there were between twenty and thirty organized teams in Sofia playing in the SSL, with around a hundred smaller, "unorganized" teams. Some teams switched between organized and unorganized status over the years. The peak of organized activity was the 1940–41 season, when there was a total of six divisions with 43 teams.

Immigrant and minority clubs –

There were several clubs which were founded by immigrant or minority communities in Sofia during this period. These were –

- Bezhanets (lit. "Refugee") – founded 1923 in south-west Sofia by Bulgarian refugees who had been displaced in the post-Russo-Turkish War and the post-Balkan Wars periods from lands which had ended up outside Bulgaria's new borders. They mainly hailed from Greek and Serbian Macedonia, Thrace, the Western Outlands and Dobrudja. Bezhanets mainly played at the 2nd and 3rd levels of the Sofia league system. Another local side, Nishava, made up mainly of refugees from the Western Outlands, merged into Bezhanets in the mid-20s.
- Homentmen (abbr. of Հ.Մ.Ը.Մ., or "HMEM" – Armenian general union of body culture) – founded 1918 in eastern Sofia by the Armenian community, which has lived in Bulgaria for centuries, but increased in the late 19th and early 20th centuries. They played in the third tier of the Sofia league during the 1930s.
- Akoah (from כּוֹחַ, koah – "power") – founded 1925 in west Sofia by the Jewish community, after the merger of SK Zhabotinski (est. 1919) and SK Gloria (est. 1920, itself part of the Maccabi gymnastic society). Akoah moved between the second and third divisions during the 1920s–1930s.
- Gallipoli – this was the club of the Russian White Guard émigrés, who came to Bulgaria following the Russian Civil War. Although they never played organized football, Gallipoli were a strong side – three documented results of theirs from 1922 are – a 4–2 win over Levski in April, a 7–1 win over OSK Slava in August, and a 4–4 draw with FK13 in September.
- Egipet ("Egypt") – founded 1929 in west Sofia by the Roma community. This was an unorganized club, merged into Botev in 1935.

Team colours summary

Slavia
(1913–45)
Levski
(~1920–44)
AS23
(1923–44)
FK13
(1909–44)
Shipka
(1924–42)

Sportklub
(1920–42)
ZhSK
(1929–49)
Botev
(1919–46)
Rakovski
(1911–43)
Benkovski
(1919–49)

=== Transitional period – 1944–49 ===
After the communists came to power, they immediately began rearranging Bulgarian football by merging many of the existing clubs into agglomerated teams. The number of organized teams was halved in the first few months – from 29 to 14. The main newly formed "people’s physical culture associations", or NFDs, during this period are –

- Chavdar – unofficially supported by the People's Army, "Chavdar" was the name of a partisan brigade fighting against the tsar's army and gendarmerie.^{(bg)} They took over the AS23 Stadium as well as all of the assets and many players from five large and half a dozen smaller clubs from central and eastern Sofia. In Chavdar were amalgamated – AS23 and Shipka from the Regional Division, Pobeda Orlandovtsi and Tsar Boris III from Division I, and Asparuh from Division II, as well as several unorganized clubs. After Chavdar were relegated from the top division for the 1947–48 season, the decision was taken to merge it with the strong Septemvri mid-season, at which point the club became officially sponsored by the people's army, was renamed Septemvri pri CDV ("Septemvri at Central Army Home") and took Septemvri's place in the Regional Division. The two would separate out again with the creation of the DSOs a year later.
- Septemvri – ("September", in honour of the communist coup d’état) were the other large team that was formed. In it were amalgamated eight large clubs from western Sofia – Sportist, who had recently been promoted to the Regional Division; Pobeda Sofia, Ustrem, Sportklub–Sredets and Botev from Division I, Svoboda and Sokol from Division II, as well as the now unorganized club Vazrazhdane (est. 1925 as Akoah). The core of Septemvri was the old Sportklub. Merged with Chavdar to form Septemvri pri CDV in 1948.
- Slavia 45 – a merger of three large and several small clubs from south-west Sofia – Slavia from the Regional Division, Bulgaria (est. 1915) from Division II and Bezhanets (est. 1923) from Division III.
- Rakovski–FK – a merger of two clubs from south-central Sofia – FK13 from the Regional Division and Rakovski from Division I.
- PSK–Levski – a merger of two south-central Sofia clubs – Levski and the postal workers' club Knyaz Kiril, both from the Regional Division.
- Aside from having their name changed to Lokomotiv, ZhSK were hardly affected during this period, as they were already a workers' club, which conformed to the socialist ideal. Benkovski were also not majorly affected.

=== DSO period – 1949–57 ===
In September 1949, before the start of the 1950 season, the central committee of the communist party decided to rearrange the nation's sporting structure according to the Soviet model. Thus, Sofia initially ended up with eight teams in 1949. As the new "A" Republican Football Group" was formed that same year, the best among these teams competed directly at national level, as they had done during the three seasons between 1937 and 1940. The party generally attempted to amalgamate teams from all over the city when forming the new DSOs, so that the workers who worked at the various factories around the city could train at relatively convenient locations at their respective DSO facility. Sofia's teams during this period were –

- CDNV – the "Central home of the people’s troops" was directly run by the people's army and was outside the DSO structures. The team often changed its name over its early years, with "CDNV" being retained for the longest period before 1957. CDNV was more or less a direct continuation of Chavdar, and kept essentially the same structure that was already established since Chavdar's founding in 1944, the main difference being that CDNV was now overtly the armed forces' team, rather than merely being backed by them. CDNV won five titles during the DSO period.
- Dinamo Sofia – the light industry workers' organization. This was an amalgamation of PSK–Levski, Borislav (est. 1914 in west Sofia and recently renamed to Tekstilets, or "textile worker"), Polet ("Flight", est. 1920 in north Sofia) and the printers' team Grafik. Dinamo were champions twice during this period.
- Spartak Sofia – the interior ministry DSO (including militsiya and fire service), so-named in honour of Spartacus. This amalgamated Rakovski–FK and Yunak, along with its stadium, located within walking distance of the ministry headquarters. In fact, Spartak was fully formed as early as 1947, merely changing its initials from NFD to DSO in 1949. Runners-up twice during this period.
- Torpedo Sofia – the heavy industry workers' organization. This organization was essentially centred around the railway workers and, indeed, soon reverted to the name DSO Lokomotiv. DSO Torpedo amalgamated NFD Lokomotiv, Benkovski, Fortuna (est. 1920 in north Sofia and recently renamed Himik, or "Chemist"), and Metalik (est. 1946 through the merger of two newly formed workers' clubs – one in east Sofia, one in west Sofia).
- Cherveno Zname Sofia ("Red Flag") – the bureaucrats' and accountants' DSO. This was the smallest DSO and merged Sportist (formed 1923 in east Sofia) and the municipal workers' Sredets (formed 1936).
- Akademik Sofia – the higher education DSO. This was newly formed in 1947, finishing third once during the DSO period.
- DSO Septemvri – split off from CDV. A direct continuation of NFD Septemvri, which had existed 1944–48.
- Stroitel Sofia ("Builder") – the construction industry and tradesmen's DSO. The structure of the organization was essentially a direct continuation of Slavia 45. Runners-up once, disbanded in 1954.
- Udarnik Sofia ("Productive worker") – the construction troops' DSO, separated out from Stroitel in 1951. Runners-up twice during the DSO period.
- Unified Team – this was in reality the national side, which was entered into the A RFG during the first half of the 1953 season with the aim that it would have regular competitive practice. It was taken out halfway through the campaign due to international engagements, and its players returned to their regular teams. At the time it left the A RFG, the Unified Team was top of the league with 11 wins and 2 losses.

There were also several smaller factory, ministry and army unit sides. These fielded separate teams which were nevertheless still under the auspices of their respective DSOs, and mainly played in the regional divisions. The most successful of these were –

- Zavod 12 – the team from "Factory 12" in southwestern Sofia, which made industrial vehicles. Promoted to the A RFG for three seasons, finishing 3rd once.
- VVS Sofia – the air force team, which managed two seasons in the A RFG, best finish – 8th. Merged into CDNA in 1956.

No other Sofia team made it into the A RFG during this period. Among those in the Sofia Regional Group were the army team "Regiment 1605", the "6th September Factory" (not far from Factory 12), the security services’ "Chekist", and "Prenos–Prevoz" ("Freight and transport").

=== DFS period – 1957–89 ===
During the destalinization period, the DSOs were disbanded and the teams were rearranged on a territorial basis. They were rebranded DFSs (see above), and ordinary people were only allowed to train with their local team. The core structures of the DSOs remained, however they functioned in a different way. Some, for example, were sent to different parts of the city, such as DFS Levski, which inherited much of DSO Dinamo's structure, but had to move its headquarters across town from southwestern Sofia to the northeast part of the capital. Sofia greeted the DFS period with eight large teams, which were gradually reduced to five –

- DFS Cherveno zname was merged into CDNA in 1963 to form "CSKA–Cherveno zname", which in 1969 also swallowed up DFS Septemvri, to form "CSKA–Septemvriysko zname". This was essentially the structure the club retained until the end of communism, in November 1989, although it was renamed "Sredets" in 1985. The strongest team during the three decades of the DFS era, CSKA won 20 championships.
- DFS Levski and DFS Spartak were merged in 1969 to form DFS Levski–Spartak, which remained under the auspices of the interior ministry. Levski were runners-up several times and champions once before the merger, while Spartak's best performances were three 4th-place finishes, and it had been relegated on two occasions. After the merger, Levski–Spartak were champions on six occasions, and, after 1985, the renamed Vitosha were champions once.
- DSO Udarnik was renamed DFS Slavia and remained under the auspices of the construction troops. Aside from being briefly merged with DFS Lokomotiv to form DFS ZhSK–Slavia, it underwent no major changes until 1989. Runners-up three times.
- DFS Lokomotiv underwent no major changes save for their 1969–71 merger with Slavia. They were champions twice before 1989.
- DFS Akademik also underwent no major changes until 1989. They only became a strong side after being "wild-carded" into the A RFG mid-season in 1969, to fill the void left by the merger of Levski and Spartak. They finished third once, qualifying for Europe, but were relegated to the local division in the early 1980s.

=== Democratic period – 1989–present ===
After the end of communism, Bulgaria's DFSs gradually became joint stock companies. Sofia's four big clubs from before 1989 remain unchanged to this day, although under a capitalist mode of governance. At no point have any of them been relegated. As of 2013 –

- Levski – Play in northeast Sofia, in the Poduyane neighbourhood. Nine-time champions since 1990. Play in all-blue.
- CSKA – broke off ties to the armed forces but retained the name. They play at the Bulgarian Army Stadium in the city's central park, the Borisova Gradina. Champions five times. Play in all-red.
- Slavia – play in southwest Sofia in the suburb of the same name. Champions once, in 1996. Play in all-white.
- Lokomotiv – play in the north Sofia suburb of Nadezhda. Best finish – runners-up in 1995 and three 3rd-place finishes. Play in red and black stripes and black shorts.

During part of the 1990s–2000s, all Sofia derbies were played at the National Stadium. As of the 2013–14 season, this is only true for the Levski–CSKA derby.

Though Septemvri made a brief appearance in the A PFG in 1998, as did Akademik in 2010, the general structure of Sofia football has remained unchanged throughout the democratic period.

Continuity of club histories

While there is not much debate about which current teams are the legal successors of which teams from the past, there is a certain amount of confusion and debate as to which clubs can be considered the "moral successors" of their predecessors. A stark example of this came to a head before the 2013–14 season, when а new JSC called "CSKA 1923" was formed, by several ex-CSKA stars aiming to buy the club, including ex-manager Asparuh Nikodimov. The reason behind the name is the date of formation of CSKA's earliest predecessor, AS23. However, many people, including Levski owner Todor Batkov, criticized the moral implications of this, with the Levski president saying that it is not correct for the one-time club of the People's Army to allocate itself the history of a club whose members were its ideological enemies, some of whom were killed during the anti-monarchist purges^{(bg)} of 1944–45, such as AS23's honorary chairman, Gen. Constantine Lukasz. The controversy was the most public debate about an issue which pervades many modern Bulgarian clubs, including Levski themselves, many of whose members distance themselves from Levski–Spartak's history of association with the communist-era Interior Ministry and State Security service.

== Stadia ==
As of 2013, there are seven functioning football stadiums in Sofia –

- The national Vasil Levski stadium,
- CSKA's Bulgarian Army Stadium, just to the south of it
- Levski's Georgi Asparuhov stadium
- Lokomotiv Stadium in north Sofia
- Slavia Stadium in southwestern Sofia
- Akademik Stadium in eastern Sofia
- Vihar stadium in the southeastern suburb of Gorublyane.

There are also several other semi-functioning stadiums which are mainly used for training and non-official matches, such as the –

- Old Akademik Stadium, to the south of the new one
- Septemvri Stadium in western Sofia
- Levski's Rakovski Stadium, in southern Sofia. This was called Torpedo Stadium during the 1950s. Rakovski stadium is currently owned by Levski, which has a second training school there. Thus, Levski fields two separate teams in the local youth competition – Levski-Gerena and Levski-Rakovski.

There are also several other stadiums in the detached suburbs and villages surrounding Sofia, which are also part of Sofia municipality.

Demolished stadia –

Built before 1944

Before the communist era, most teams played on hard soil (dirt) pitches. Very few grounds had specially built stands, and the ones that did were mostly wooden. Nevertheless, the big clubs' home grounds were officially owned pieces of land and were sanctioned for official matches by the SOSO. The main stadia were –

- Yunak Stadium – this was the largest pre-war stadium in Bulgaria, located immediately to the southwest of the current national stadium. It was owned by the amateur Yunak Gymnastic Society, which did not field a football team in the local leagues. Built in concrete and completed in 1928, it was demolished in 1949. Capacity – 25 000
- AS23 Field, completed 1938. Capacity – 15 000. In the 1940s it was fitted with a turf field, thus becoming the only grass-covered football ground in Bulgaria. Demolished in the early 1960s to make place for the larger People's army stadium that now stands in its place.
- Slavia Field – near the Russian Monument, south-central Sofia, built in the mid-1920s. Capacity – 12,000.
- Levski Field, completed 1934, capacity – 10 000. Demolished in 1949 to make way for the new national stadium, opened 1953.
- Bulgaria Field – the home ground of Bulgaria Sofia SC, built in the mid-1920s. Capacity – 5,000. The Rakovski Stadium currently stands in its place.
- Old Lokomotiv Stadium – in the industrial zone just to the northeast of Zaharna Fabrika railway station in northern Sofia.
- FK13 Field – located between the Yunak and Levski stadiums. Demolished in 1949 along with the Yunak Stadium in order to make way for the smaller "Druzhba" ("Friendship") stadium, which was also used as an ice rink.

Built after 1944

- Dinamo Stadium – located to the southeast of Rakovski/Torpedo stadium. After 1957, DFS Levski were sent to north-eastern Sofia, and DFS Spartak inherited the stadium. The Spartak swimming and fitness complex now stands in its place.
- Cherveno Zname Stadium – at the "4th Kilometre" area of southeast Sofia. This was part of a sports complex that later passed to CSKA after the merger of the two teams. As of 2011, the parking lot of the Sofia Arena stands on the site of the stadium.

== Success in Europe ==
As of the 2013–14 season, Bulgaria has a low UEFA coefficient and few quotas for European competition – the country is ranked 28th out of 53 UEFA members, having one spot in the 2nd qualifying round of the Champions' League, and three spots for the 1st and 2nd qualifying rounds of the Europa League. Bulgaria has performed much better in the past on the European stage, however. Here is a summary of the most successful moments of Sofia teams playing in Europe, until 1989 –

- CSKA –
  - Oct 1960 – CDNA knock out Italian champions Juventus 4–3 on aggregate, including a 4–1 win in Sofia.
  - May 1967 – CSKA–Cherveno zname reach the semi-finals of the European Cup after a relatively easy run of matches, eventually losing to Inter 1–0 after a replay.
  - Nov 1973 – CSKA–Septemvriysko zname knock out European champions Ajax 2–1 on aggregate, after having been beaten 6–1 by them the previous season. They go on to reach the quarter-finals, where they lose 5–3 to Bayern Munich.
  - Oct 1980 – CSKA knock out European champions Nottingham Forest 2–0 on aggregate, eventually losing 6–1 to eventual champions Liverpool in the quarter-finals.
  - Mar 1982 – CSKA knock out European champions Liverpool 2–1 on aggregate in the quarter-finals, a year after having been knocked out by them at the same stage of the tournament. CSKA go on to lose 7–4 to Bayern Munich at the semi-final stage, including a dramatic 4–3 first leg win in Sofia.
  - April 1989 – CSKA–Sredets reach the semi-finals of the Cup Winners' Cup, beating Dutch cup winners Roda JC on penalties along the way, eventually losing 6–3 to Barcelona.
  - Mar 1990 – CSKA reach the quarter-finals of the European Cup, eventually losing 4–1 to Marseille.
- Slavia –
  - May 1967 – Slavia reach the semi-finals of the Cup Winners' Cup, beating Strasbourg along the way, eventually losing 2–0 to Rangers.
  - Mar 1981 – Slavia reach the quarter-finals of the Cup Winners' Cup, eventually losing 6–3 to Feyenoord.
- Levski–Spartak –
  - Mar 1970 – Levski–Spartak reach the quarter-finals of the Cup Winners' Cup, eventually losing on penalties to Górnik Zabrze.
  - Mar 1976 – Levski–Spartak reach the quarter-finals of the UEFA Cup, beating Ajax on penalties along the way, eventually losing 8–5 to Barcelona.
  - Mar 1977 – Levski–Spartak reach the quarter-finals of the Cup Winners' Cup, beating Boavista on away goals along the way, eventually losing 3–2 to Atlético Madrid.
  - Mar 1987 – Vitosha reach the quarter-finals of the Cup Winners' Cup, eventually losing 4–0 to Real Zaragoza.
- Lokomotiv –
  - Mar 1980 – Lokomotiv reach the quarter-finals of the UEFA Cup, beating Monaco 5–4 and Dynamo Kyiv on away goals along the way, eventually losing 4–1 to Stuttgart.
- Akademik –
  - Oct 1976 – Akademik beat AC Milan 4–3 in a dramatic first-leg tie in Sofia, before bowing out 5–4 on aggregate in the second round.

Post-1989

The only team to have reached a European quarter final in the post-1989 era is Levski, who did so during the 2005–06 UEFA Cup.
