= 2001 in Bulgaria =

- Decades: 1980s; 1990s; 2000s; 2010s; 2020s
- See also: Other events of 2001; Timeline of Bulgarian history

Events in the year 2001 in Bulgaria.

== Incumbents ==
- President: Petar Stoyanov
- Prime Minister: Ivan Kostov (from 1997 until July 24) Simeon Sakskoburggotski (from July 24 until 2005)

== Events ==
- November – Thousands march through Sofia on 100th day of Simeon's premiership, saying he has failed to improve living standards.
