= Georgi Rikov =

Bulgarian linguist and scientist (1946–2002)

Georgi Todorov Rikov
- Георги Тодоров Риков
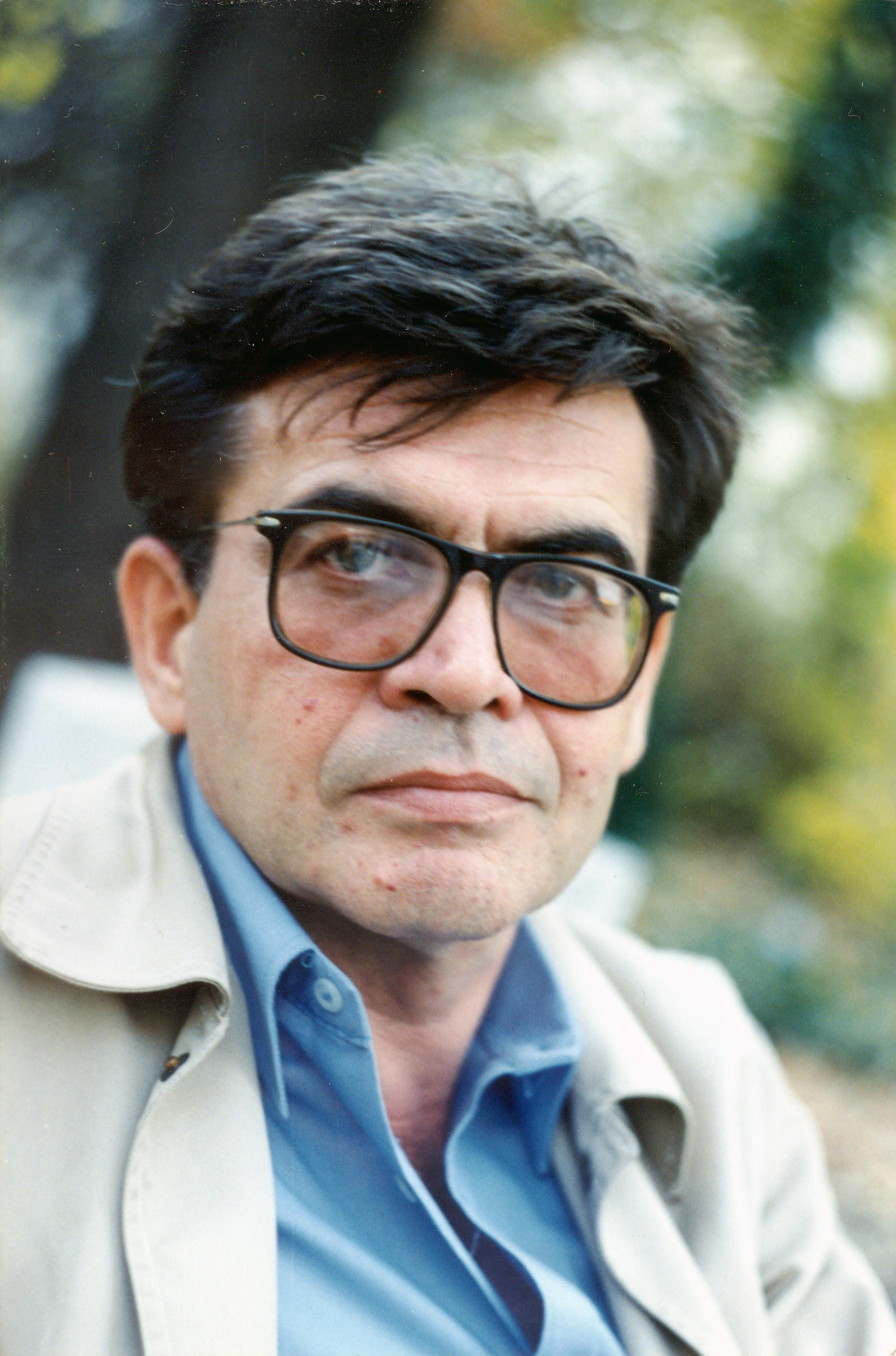
- Born: August 14, 1946
- Died: December 28, 2002 (aged 56)
- Occupation(s): Linguist, Philologist

Georgi Todorov Rikov (Bulgarian: Георги Тодоров Риков) (14 August 1946 – 28 December 2002) was a Bulgarian linguist and scientist, the editor-in-chief of Orpheus: Journal of Indo-European and Thracian Studies.

Rikov attended Sofia University "St. Kliment Ohridski", graduating in 1972. From 1977 through 1992, he worked at the Institute for Bulgarian Language of the Bulgarian Academy of Sciences. From 1992 through 2002, he worked in the department of General, Indo-European and Balkan Languages at Sofia University.

His body of work has been divided into five sections: Indo-European linguistics, with a focus on a present nasal infix in the Heto-Luwian languages called "ultimae laryngalis"; Slavic studies with a focus on ska- etymology; Anatolian languages; Greek; and miscellanea.

== Published works ==
A copy of select papers was published in 2018, funded by a grant from Sofia University "St. Kliment Ohridski". The articles were compiled from the journals Linquistique Balkanique ISSN 0324-1653, Orpheus: Journal of Indo-European and Thracian Studies ISSN 0861-9387, Studia Etymologica Cracoviensia ISSN 1427-8219, and Studia Indogermanica Lodziensia ISSN 1506-7254, all with the permission of his sister Reni Rikova. One of the editors of that publication, Professor Biliana Mihaylova of Sofia University's department of General, Indo-European and Balkan Languages, also published a bibliography of Rikov's works dating from 1979 through 2002.

His works have been described to "represent an incalculable wealth and an example of precise work, attention to every little element of language".

=== Select bibliography ===
==== Indo-European linguistics ====
- Rikov, Georgi T. (1992). "Sonants, Laryngeals and the Indo-European Nasal Infix Presents". Orpheus. Journal of Indo-European and Thracian Studies (2): 87–96. ISSN 0861-9387 – via CEEOL.
- Rikov, Georgi T. (1993). "Lithuanian peneti, peslas and the Indo-European Nasal Infix Presents". Linguistica Baltica (2): 115–119. ISSN 1230-3984.
- Rikov, Georgi T. (1996). "On the Formation of the Hittite Nasal Verbs in -na-/-niya-". Orpheus. Journal of Indo-European and Thracian Studies (6): 71–79. ISSN 0861-9387 – via CEEOL.
- Rikov, Georgi T. (1997). "Hittite (i)yanna-, Tocharian B yanem and the Indo-European Nasal Infix Présents of the Type CRenhx". Orpheus. Journal of Indo-European and Thracian Studies (7): 9–36. ISSN 0861-9387 – via CEEOL.

==== Slavic linguistics ====
- Rikov, Georgi T. (1981). "Основа и флексия в индоевропейската и праславянската глаголна система" [Stem and inflection in Indo-European and the Proto-Slavic verb system]. Съпоставително езикознание (in Bulgarian). 6 (3–5): 14–18. ISSN 0204-8701.
- Rikov, Georgi T. (1986). "The Indo-European ex-Conjugation and the Origin of the Proterodynamic VerbInflection (part 1)". Linguistique Balkanique. 29 (1): 19–58. ISSN 0324-1653.
- Rikov, Georgi T. (1987). "The Indo-European ex-Conjugation and the Origin of the Proterodynamic VerbInflection (part 2)". Linguistique Balkanique. 30 (4): 209–245. ISSN 0324-1653.
- Rikov, Georgi T. (1987). "Бълг. диал. мренка, мрянка". Балканско езикозние (in Bulgarian). 37 (1–2): 106–108. ISSN 0324-1653.
- Rikov, Georgi T. (1987). "Бълг. мотая=лит. matóti, matóju". Балканско езикозние (in Bulgarian). 37 (3): 198–199. ISSN 0324-1653.
- Rikov, Georgi T. (1987). "Преслав. *strąkъ (> бълг. стрък), норв. диал. strange 'стъбло без клони, тояга, пън'и пр". Балканско езикозние (in Bulgarian). 37 (4): 307–310.
- Rikov, Georgi T. (1987). "Праслав. *njuxāti, *njuxā ją (бълг. диал. нюам)". Балканско езикозние (in Bulgarian). 37 (6): 472–474. ISSN 0324-1653.
- Rikov, Georgi T. (1988). "Бълг. диал.cmpakà и cmpykà". Балканско езикозние (in Bulgarian). 38 (1): 27–28. ISSN 0324-1653.
- Rikov, Georgi T. (1998). "The long root vowels in the Slavic verbs of the type běžą, sěką, zěją". In Rusek, Jerzy; Boryś, Wiesław (eds.). Prasłowiańszczyzna i jej rozpad (1 ed.). Warsaw: Wydawn. Energeia. pp. 107–115. ISBN 9788385118879.

==== Anatolian languages ====
- Rikov, Georgi T. (1981). "Hittite Etymologies I (1–3)". Linguistique Balkanique. 24 (3): 29–30. ISSN 0324-1653.
- Rikov, Georgi T. (1982). "Two Etymologies". Linguistique Balkanique. 25 (1): 81–82. ISSN 0324-1653.
- Rikov, Georgi T. (1982). "Hittite Etymologies II (4–8)". Linguistique Balkanique. 25 (2): 21–26. ISSN 0324-1653.
- Rikov, Georgi T. (1980). "On the Distinction between Indo-European H2 and H3 in Hittite". Linguistique Balkanique. 23 (1): 75–82. ISSN 0324-1653.
- Rikov, Georgi T. (1982). "Notes on Hittite and Luwian Grammar". Linguistique Balkanique. 25 (3): 21–38. ISSN 0324-1653.
- Rikov, Georgi T. (1983). "Zum hethitischen a -Lokativ" [To the Hittite from -Lokativ]. Linguistique Balkanique (in German). 26 (2): 81. ISSN 0324-1653.
- Rikov, Georgi T. (1984). "Etymologies". Linguistique Balkanique. 27 (1): 63–65. ISSN 0324-1653.
- Rikov, Georgi T. (1988). "Luwian za-/zi- 'this'". Linguistique Balkanique. 31 (1–2): 85–86. ISSN 0324-1653.

==== Greek language ====
- Rikov, Georgi T. (1988). "Greek ρώμη, ρῶσις and Sanskrit sāra". Glotta. Zeitschrift für griechische und lateinische Sprache. 66 (1–2): 124–125. ISSN 0017-1298. JSTOR 40266810.

==== Miscellanea ====
- Rikov, Georgi T. (1985). "Этимологические заметки" [Etymological Notes]. Этимология (in Russian): 148–151.
- Rikov, Georgi T. (1988). "Zur Entstehung der hethitischen hi-Konjugation". Šulmu: Papers on the Ancient Near East Presented at International Conference of Socialist Countries (Prague, Sept 30–Oct 3, 1986) (in German): 319–327.
