= Old High School of Music, Ruse =

Coordinates: 43°50′39″N 25°57′16.50″E

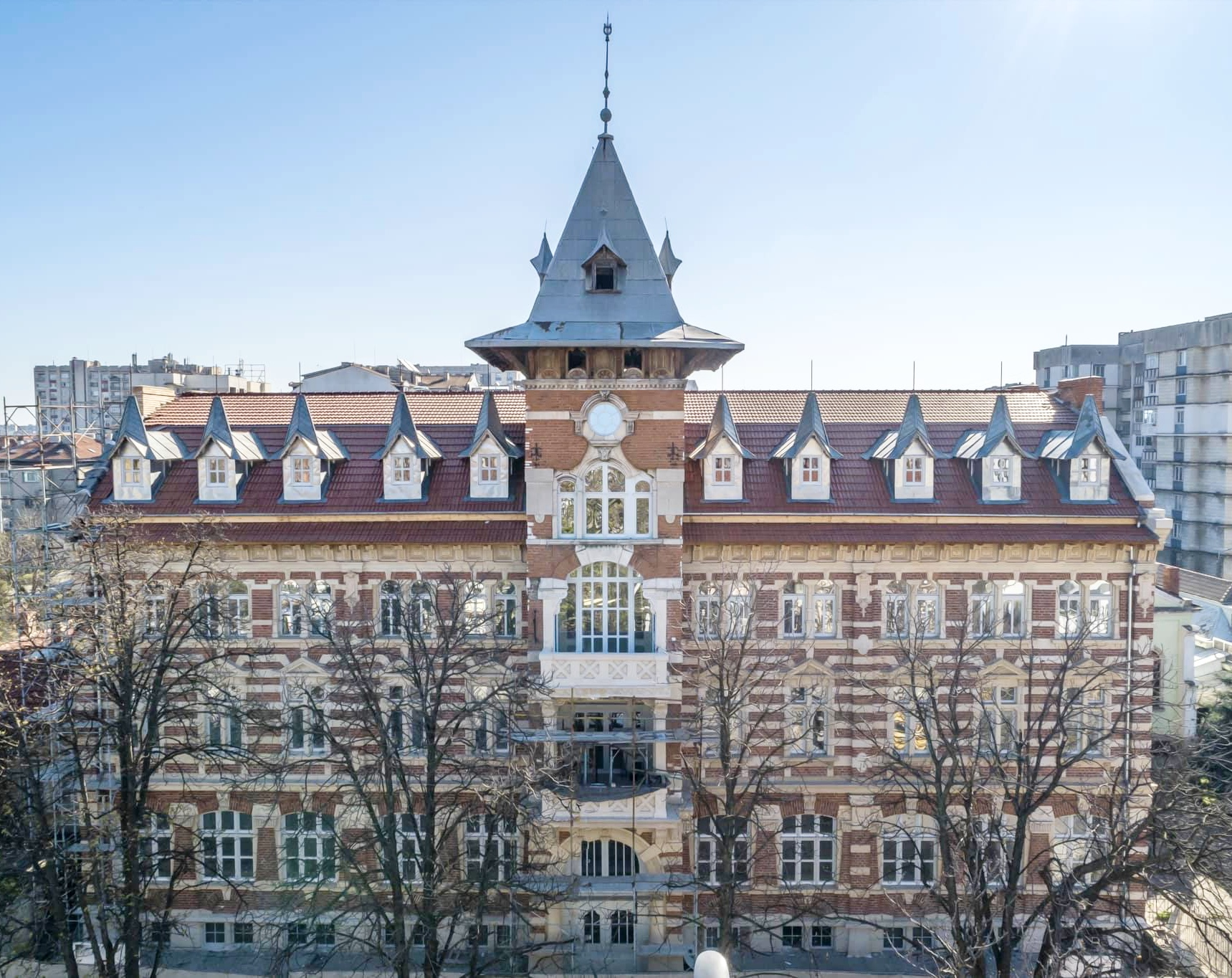
Numismatic Museum Building, former High School of Music in Ruse

The Old High School of Music (Bulgarian: Стара музикална гимназия, Stara muzikalna gimnaziya) is a historic building in Ruse, Bulgaria, located at 33 Borisova Street, which is to become a private numismatic museum and cultural center. It is currently in the process of restoration, with major work already completed as of 2019.

The building was constructed in 1900–1901 by Ruse's Protestant community to be used by the German Protestant school, as well as to accommodate its boarding house, kindergarten and orphanage. Funds (a total of 320,000 German gold marks) were secured by the local pastor Theodor Wandemann. The four-storey edifice was designed by the architect Udo Ribau and the construction was supervised by the engineers Todor Tonev and Merbach. The architectural style is eclectic, combining Neoclassical and Gothic Revival elements and Northern European influences.

The German school was inaugurated on 5 October 1905 and declared a Secondary School of Business by the Bulgarian Ministry of Economy in 1909. It was attended not only by the city's German colony, but also by the children of eminent local merchant families. During World War I, on 28 September 1918, the school, as German property, was confiscated by the Bulgarian authorities. Although it was damaged by Romanian shellfire, it was reconstructed after the war and consecutively accommodated the French St Joseph School for Boys, the Petar Beron Junior High School (since 1935), the State University of Technology (University of Ruse), and the school of the local farming machinery factory (the former Müllhaupt Factory). After that, it began to be used by Ruse's High School of Music. In 1973, it was declared a monument of culture.

Severely damaged by the 1977 Bucharest earthquake, although it was reinforced, the edifice was subsequently abandoned in disrepair until it was acquired by auction by the Bobokov brothers in April 2007. The two brothers are to invest €1,000,000 in the building's reconstruction and are obliged to convert it into a cultural and arts centre. In 2017, renovation started to convert the building into a private museum.

Directly next to the old school is Ruse's Baptist church.

== Gallery ==
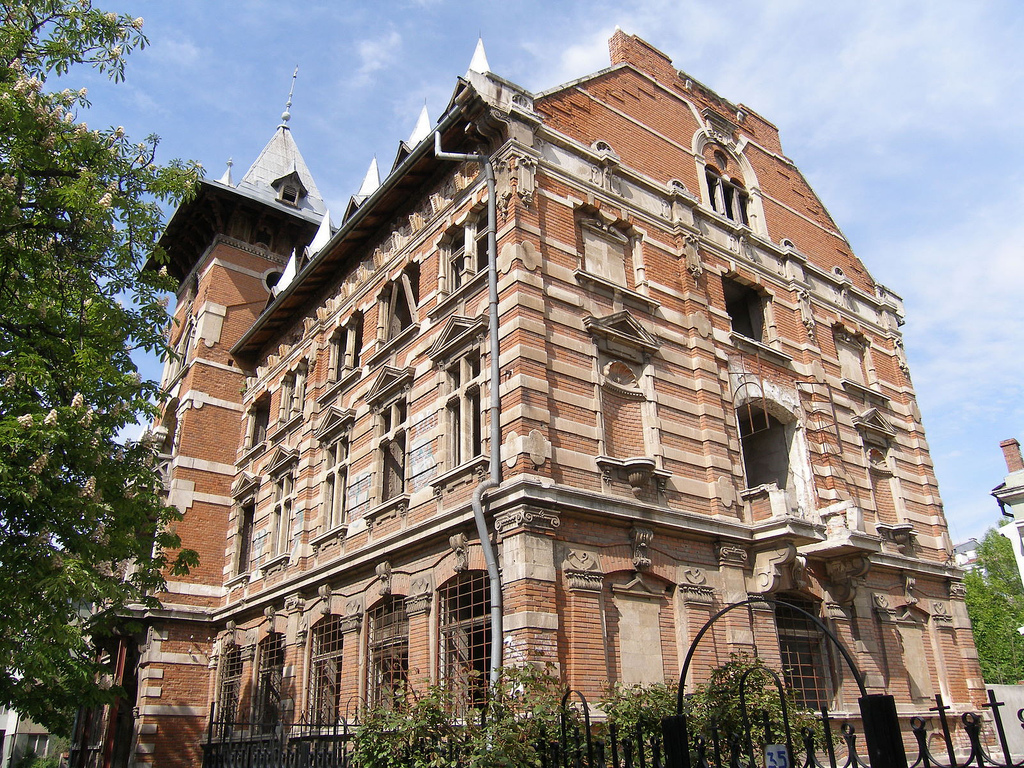

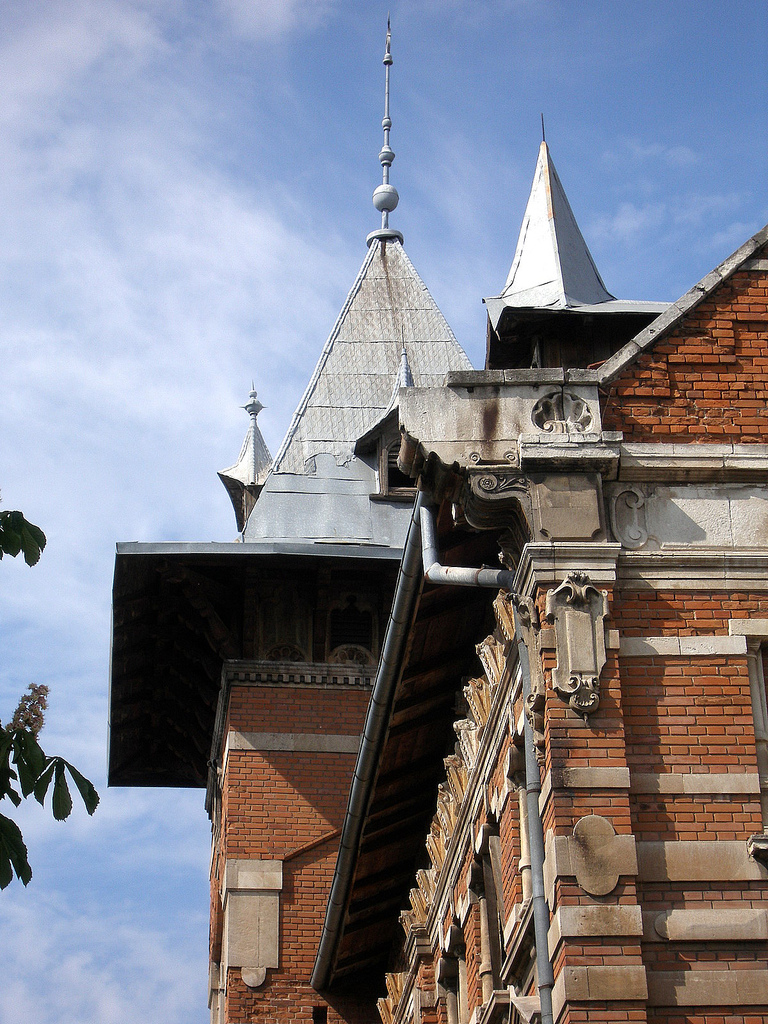

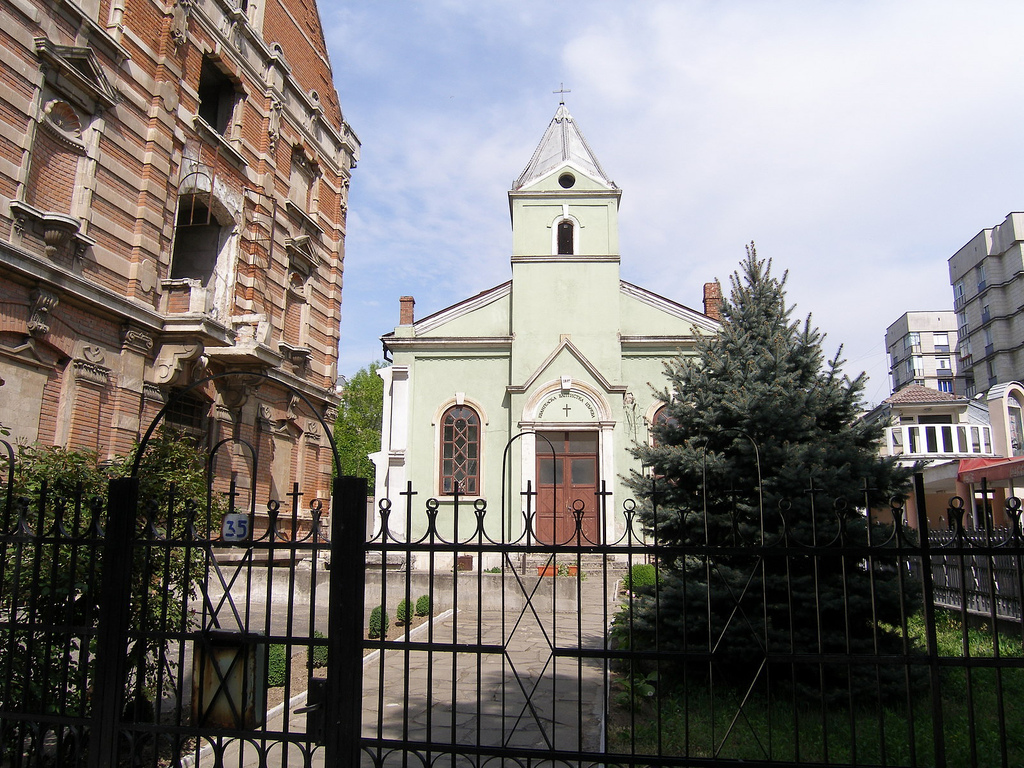

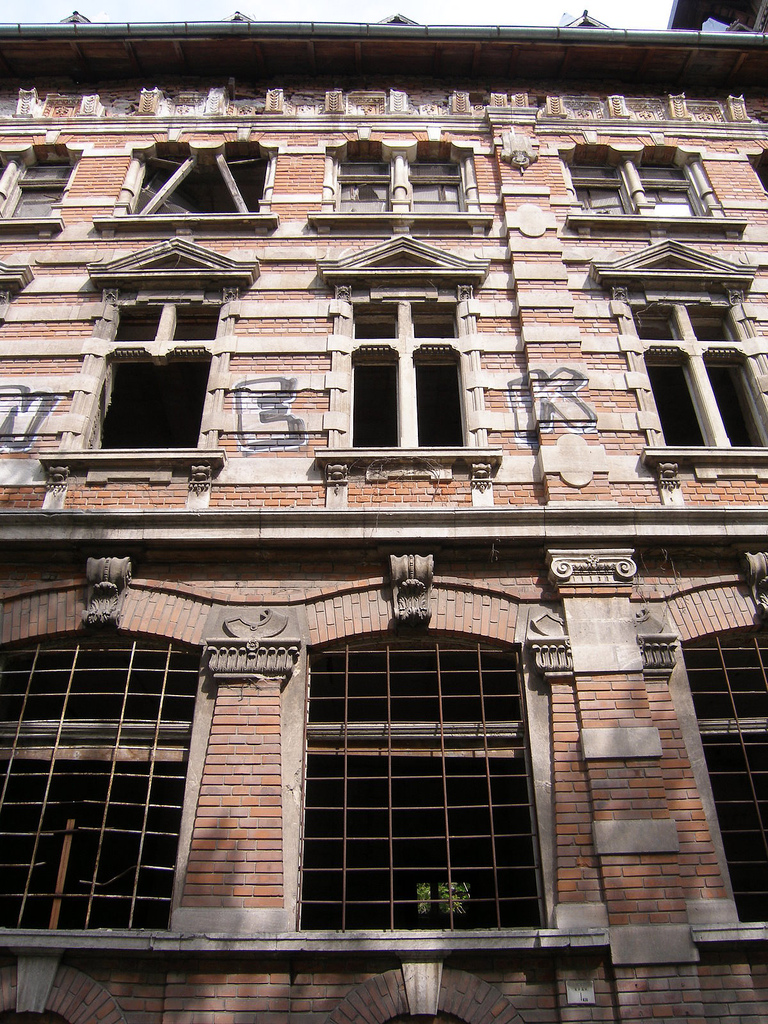
