= Sucreries Raffineries Bulgares =

Former Belgian company

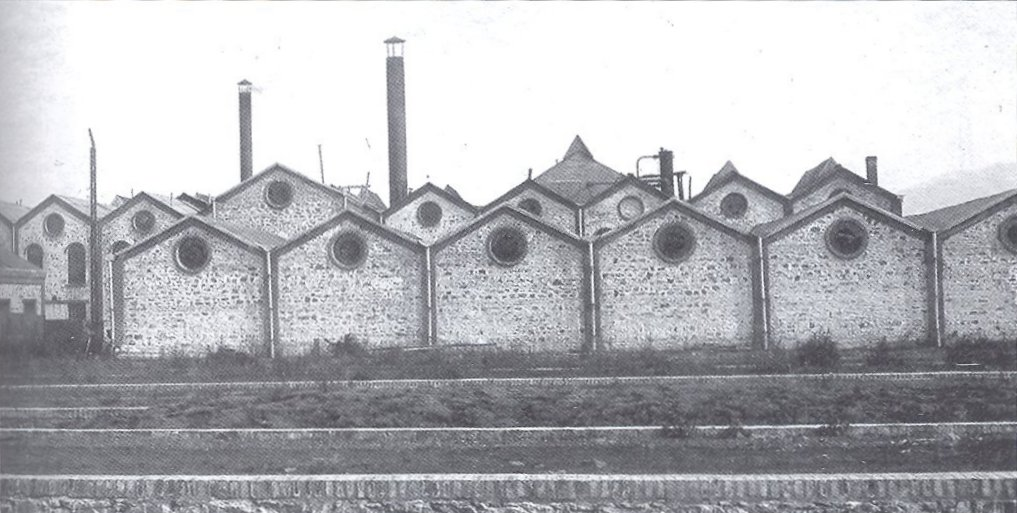
The Sucreries Raffineries Bulgares factory around 1900

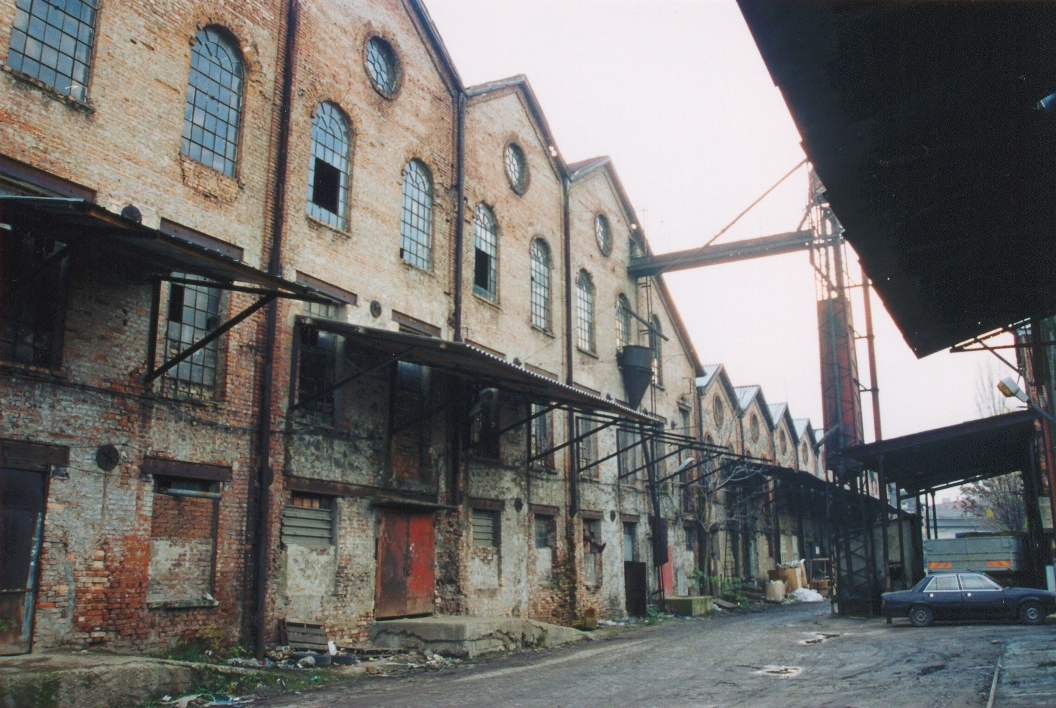
The abandoned factory in 2005

Sucreries Raffineries Bulgares (French for "Bulgarian sugar refineries"; Bulgarian: Български захарни фабрики и рафинерии, Balgarski zaharni fabriki i rafinerii) was a Belgian company active in Bulgaria from 1897 to 1916.

In March 1895, three Belgian industrialists were granted a 10-year concession over sugar beet production in the Bulgarian regions of Sofia, Tran and Kyustendil. The investors were also given tax concessions and a Bulgarian State Railways transport discount. The concession was extended in 1897 and a subsidy of five Bulgarian leva per tonne of refined beet was granted to the Belgians.

The Sucreries Raffineries Bulgares joint-stock company was established in Brussels in May 1897; it took over the concessioners' rights and assets immediately. The main shareholder in the company was the Solvay group under Belgian chemist Ernest Solvay. Sucreries Raffineries Bulgares's factory, situated four kilometres out of Sofia's city limits at the time, in what is today the Zaharna Fabrika ("sugar factory") neighbourhood, was opened on 28 November 1898 in the presence of Bulgarian monarch Prince Ferdinand I. The Sucreries Raffineries Bulgares was the largest industrial enterprise in the Principality of Bulgaria at the time. It was constructed near the Sofia–Kyustendil railway in order to facilitate transport. Most of the equipment was Belgian-made, though some of the machinery and the coke were shipped from the German Empire and machine oil was delivered from Austria-Hungary. The refinery used limestone from Slivnitsa and water from the Vladaya River. 23 Belgian specialists arrived in Bulgaria to work in the factory and train the staff.

Production in the refinery was pronouncedly seasonal: the factory employed from 500 to 1,200 people from October to March and only around 150 in the remaining months. The factory had the capacity to produce 7,000 tonnes of refined sugar a year, though production hardly ever exceeded 5,000 tonnes annually. The company's market share reached a maximum of 20%. In 1916, with Bulgaria's entry into World War I as part of the Central Powers, the Belgian investors sold their assets and left the country; the factory closed in 1925 despite modernisation in 1921.

The factory's buildings, officially designed a monument of culture of national importance, have been abandoned and disused for many decades, which has led to their very bad condition. A group of architects has informally suggested several ideas to use the buildings, for example as a museum of modern art, as loft apartments or as an unlimited space for smokers (smoking in public places is to be banned in Bulgaria in 2010). The factory played a prominent role in Bulgarian director Ivan Nichev's 2005 film Children of Wax; in the film, the Sucreries Raffineries Bulgares factory was the set for the Berlin immigrant neighbourhood Kreuzberg.
