= Balkantourist =

Travel and holiday companies of Bulgaria

Balkantourist logo

Balkantourist (Bulgarian: Балкантурист) is the oldest existing Bulgarian tour operator, established on 6 January 1948 as a state-owned government monopoly in what was then the People's Republic of Bulgaria. Privatised in 1995, it has continued to exist in the post-1989 conditions of market economy.

Balkantourist was founded as a self-supporting enterprise, part of the Ministry of Railways, during the government of Georgi Dimitrov. With a starting capital of 300 million leva, its initial service was to compensate Czechoslovakia's enterprises in Bulgaria that were nationalized after the Bulgarian coup d'état of 1944 by offering holidays on the Bulgarian Black Sea Coast to Czechoslovak citizens. As the war reparations imposed on Bulgaria after World War II made the country unable to compensate Czechoslovakia financially, Czechoslovak leader Klement Gottwald suggested the idea.

In the following decades, Balkantourist gradually expanded its business to include mountain and cultural tourism in Bulgaria, as well as servicing tourists from other countries of the Eastern Bloc besides Czechoslovakia: the Soviet Union, East Germany, Poland, Hungary, Romania. Balkantourist played a major role in the establishment of planned seaside resorts such as Golden Sands and Sunny Beach, and Bulgaria's policy of international tourism as a profitable branch inspired other socialist countries such as Yugoslavia and Romania to develop their own seaside resorts.

After the democratic changes in 1989, Balkantourist was privatised in 1995 by the Bulgarian Tourist Holding. As of 2008, it offers holidays in Bulgaria and in more than 35 destinations abroad. The company owns Grand Hotel Varna, the Lebed, Rubin, Delfin, Delfin Marina, Paradise Beach and International hotels on the Black Sea coast, Hotel Rila in Borovets, Arbanasi Palace and Grand Hotel Bulgaria in Sofia.
