= 2003 in Bulgaria =

- Decades: 1980s; 1990s; 2000s; 2010s; 2020s
- See also: Other events of 2003; Timeline of Bulgarian history

Events in the year 2003 in Bulgaria.

== Incumbents ==
- President: Georgi Parvanov
- Prime Minister: Simeon Sakskoburggotski

== Events ==
- 29 August – A grenade launcher was fired at Bulgarian troops supporting the United States in Iraq in the second holiest Shiite city of Karbala, but there were no casualties.
