= 1980s in Bulgaria =

The 1980s in the People's Republic of Bulgaria.

== Incumbents ==
- General Secretary of the Bulgarian Communist Party:
  - Todor Zhivkov (1954–1989)
  - Petar Mladenov (1989–1990)
- Chairman of the State Council:
  - Todor Zhivkov (1971–1989)
  - Petar Mladenov (1989–1990)
- Prime Minister of Bulgaria:
  - Stanko Todorov (1971–1981)
  - Grisha Filipov (1981–1986)
  - Georgi Atanasov (1986–1990)

== Events ==
=== 1980 ===
- Konstantin Pavlov's screenplay for the film Illusion won the Grand Prix at the Karlovy Vary Film Festival.

=== 1981 ===
- The philosopher Zhelyu Zhelev publishes a book called "Fascism" in which he compares communism to fascism. Shortly after the books completion however, the government bans it from stores. The book becomes legally available again following the end of communist rule in Bulgaria.
- Elias Canetti wins the 1981 Nobel Prize in Literature "for writings marked by a broad outlook, a wealth of ideas and artistic power".
- Construction was completed on the Buzludzha Monument, to commemorate the early socialist movement in Bulgaria.

=== 1982 ===
- The 1982 Bulgarian Cup Final was the 42nd final of the Bulgarian Cup (in this period the tournament was named Cup of the Soviet Army), and was contested between Lokomotiv Sofia and Lokomotiv Plovdiv on 12 June 1982 at Slavi Aleksiev Stadium in Pleven. Lokomotiv Sofia won the final 2–1 after extra time.

=== 1983 ===
- The 1983 Winter Universiade, the XI Winter Universiade, took place in Sofia, Bulgaria. This was one of only four Universiades since Winter 1981 with no official mascot.

=== 1984 ===
- The 6th World Sports Acrobatics Championships were held in Sofia, Bulgaria.

=== 1985 ===
- November 4–30 – The Expo 85 took place in Plovdiv, Bulgaria and had the theme "The creations of young inventors". It was second one to be held in Plovdiv.

=== 1986 ===
- June 8 – Parliamentary elections were held in Bulgaria.

=== 1987 ===
- The 1987 World Rhythmic Gymnastics Championships were held in Varna, Bulgaria from September 17 to September 20.

=== 1988 ===
- December 27 – Bulgaria gets rid of its ban on Radio Free Europe.

=== 1989 ===
- Long time ruler Zhivkov is ousted and a multiparty system is introduced. The opposition Union of Democratic Forces (UDF) party is formed.

== Births ==
- 1985
  - 20 October – Zhana Bergendorff, singer
- 1988
  - 28 January – Marin Yonchev, tenor

== See also ==
- History of Bulgaria
- Timeline of Bulgarian history
