= 2005 in Bulgaria =

- Decades: 1980s; 1990s; 2000s; 2010s; 2020s
- See also: Other events of 2005; Timeline of Bulgarian history

Events in the year 2005 in Bulgaria.

== Incumbents ==
- President: Georgi Parvanov
- Prime Minister: Simeon Sakskoburggotski (from 2001 until August 17) Sergei Stanishev (from August 17 until 2009)

== Events ==
- December – Bulgaria's contingent of 400 light infantry troops leaves Iraq. In February 2006 parliament agrees to dispatch a non-combat guard unit.

== Deaths ==
- 25 August - Reyhan Angelova, Bulgarian singer (n. 1986)
