= Treaty of Sofia =

1904 treaty between Bulgaria and Serbia

- Signed: 31 March 1904
- Location: Sofia, Principality of Bulgaria
- Signatories: Nikola Pašić
- Parties: Bulgaria; Serbia

The Treaty of Sofia was signed between the Principality of Bulgaria and Kingdom of Serbia on 31 March 1904. It was made up of two separate agreements regarding political and economical issues and first came into effect in April 1904. The second trade agreement was signed the following year. Influential Serbian politician Nikola Pašić sought to halt Austro-Hungarian influence. The alliance was unrealized due to Austro-Hungarian pressure and deteriorating Bulgarian–Serbian relations.
