= 1960s in Bulgaria =

The 1960s in the People's Republic of Bulgaria.

== Incumbents ==
- General Secretary of the Bulgarian Communist Party: Todor Zhivkov (1954–1989)
- Chairman of the Presidium:
  - Dimitar Ganev (1958–1964)
  - Georgi Traykov (1964–1971)
- Prime Minister of Bulgaria:
  - Anton Yugov (1956–1962)
  - Todor Zhivkov (1962–1971)

== Events ==
=== 1960 ===
- June 3–11 – The 1960 European Women's Basketball Championship was held in Sofia. The Soviet Union won the gold medal, Bulgaria won the silver medal, and Czechoslovakia won the bronze medal.
- July 20 – Po sveta i u nas, the flagship Bulgarian news program aired each day on the Bulgarian public television channel BNT 1 and the flagship channel of Bulgarian National Television (BNT), aired its pilot episode.

=== 1961 ===
- The March Music Days, a festival held annually for two weeks in the second half of March in Rousse, Bulgaria, was established.
- The 1961 Summer Universiade (II Summer Universiade), an international sporting event for university students, took place in Sofia.

=== 1962 ===
- 25 February – Parliamentary elections were held in Bulgaria.
- September 15 – October 10 – The 15th Chess Olympiad took place between in Varna.

=== 1963 ===
- September 15 – The St. Cyril and St. Methodius University of Veliko Tarnovo was established.
- The freestyle competition of the 1963 World Wrestling Championships was held in Sofia.

=== 1964 ===
- Srebyrnite grivni, one of the first rock music groups in Bulgaria, was created in Sofia.
- The A.S. Popov School of Electronics in Veliko Tarnovo was founded.
- HC CSKA Sofia, an ice hockey team from Sofia that currently plays in the Bulgarian Hockey League, was founded.

=== 1965 ===
- Officials in the Bulgarian Communist Party and officers in the Bulgarian People's Army attempted a coup d'état against the party leadership and specifically General-Secretary Todor Zhivkov. However, a counter-intelligence operation discovered these plans before the coup could be carried out.
- The 5th European Women's Artistic Gymnastics Championships were held in Sofia.

=== 1966 ===
- February 27 – Parliamentary elections were held in Bulgaria.
- November 24 – TABSO Flight LZ101, a scheduled service of the Bulgarian national airline from Sofia via Budapest and Prague to East Berlin, crashed near Bratislava. The crash, which killed all 82 passengers and crew on board, remains Slovakia's worst air disaster in history.

=== 1968 ===
- July 28 – The 9th World Festival of Youth and Students was held in Sofia. The festival attracted 20,000 people from 138 countries.
- The Mantaritza Biosphere Reserve was established to protect the old coniferous forests and the biotopes of the Western capercaillie (Tetrao urogalus).

=== 1969 ===
- The Bulgarian drama film Tango, directed by Vasil Mirchev, entered into the 6th Moscow International Film Festival.
- 27 – 29 September – The IV World Rhythmic Gymnastics Championships were held in Varna, Bulgaria.

== Births ==
- 1965
- 19 September - Iliya Lazarov, Bulgarian member of the European parliament
- 10 December - Slavcho Binev, Bulgarian politician and taekwondo champion (d. 2026)
- 1967
- 18 February - Magarditch Halvadjian, Bulgarian director and producer.
- 21 March - Ivan Tasev, Bulgarian volleyball player.

== See also ==
- History of Bulgaria
- Timeline of Bulgarian history
