= 1890 Bulgarian parliamentary election =

Parliamentary elections were held in Bulgaria on 7 September 1890. The result was an overwhelming victory for the People's Liberal Party of Prime Minister Stefan Stambolov.
