= 1910s in Bulgaria =

The 1910s in the Kingdom of Bulgaria.

== Incumbents ==
- Tsar of Bulgaria:
  - Ferdinand I (1887–1918)
  - Boris III (1918–1943)
- Prime Minister of Bulgaria:
  - Aleksandar Malinov (1908–1911)
  - Ivan Evstratiev Geshov (1911–1913)
  - Stoyan Danev (1913)
  - Vasil Radoslavov (1913–1918)
  - Aleksandar Malinov (1918)
  - Teodor Teodorov (1918–1919)
  - Aleksandar Stamboliyski (1919–1923)

== Events ==
=== 1910 ===
- The Ruse blood wedding occurs.

=== 1911 ===
- 4 September – The People's Party-Progressive Liberal Party alliance wins 190 of the 213 seats in the parliament following parliamentary elections. Voter turnout is 47.2%.

=== 1912 ===
- The First Balkan War begins.

=== 1913 ===
- 24 November – Parliamentary elections are held, resulting in a victory for the Liberal Concentration. Liberal Concentration, an alliance of the Liberal Party (Radoslavists), the People's Liberal Party and the Young Liberals Party, between them win 88 of the 204 seats in the parliament. Voter turnout is 55.0%.

=== 1914 ===
- 23 February – Parliamentary elections are held in the country. The result was a victory for the Liberal Concentration. It wins 126 of the 245 seats in the parliament. Voter turnout is 67.1%.
- July 28 – Bulgaria declares "strict and loyal neutrality"

=== 1915 ===
- 11 – 30 September – The mobilization of the Bulgarian Army on the eve of the Kingdom of Bulgaria's entry into World War I takes place.

=== 1916 ===
- 5 – 7 September – The Battle of Bazargic takes place.

=== 1917 ===
- Undated - Women's food riots begin 1917 and continue until the end of World War I.
- April 22 ~ May 9 - The Battle of Doiran is fought between the United Kingdom and Bulgaria during World War I.
- June - Greece declares war on Bulgaria.

=== 1918 ===
- 29 September – The Armistice of Salonica (also known as the Armistice of Thessalonica) is signed between Bulgaria and the Allied Powers in Thessaloniki.

=== 1919 ===
- 17 August – The Bulgarian Agrarian National Union wins 77 of the 236 seats in the parliament following parliamentary elections. Voter turnout is 54.5%.

== See also ==
- Bulgaria during World War I
- History of Bulgaria
- Timeline of Bulgarian history
