= 2006 in Bulgaria =

- Decades: 1980s; 1990s; 2000s; 2010s; 2020s
- See also: Other events of 2006; Timeline of Bulgarian history

Events in the year 2006 in Bulgaria.

== Incumbents ==
- President: Georgi Parvanov
- Prime Minister: Sergei Stanishev

== Events ==
- 22 October – Presidential elections were held in Bulgaria.

== Deaths ==
- December 7 - Lyuben Berov, prime minister (1992-1994)
