= 1930s in Bulgaria =

The 1930s in the Kingdom of Bulgaria.

== Incumbents ==
- Tsar of Bulgaria: Boris III (1918–1943)
- Prime Minister of Bulgaria:
  - Andrey Lyapchev (1926–1931)
  - Aleksandar Malinov (1931)
  - Nikola Mushanov (1931–1934)
  - Kimon Georgiev (1934–1935)
  - Pencho Zlatev (1935)
  - Andrey Toshev (1935)
  - Georgi Kyoseivanov (1935–1940)

== Events ==
=== 1930 ===
- October 4 – Tsar Boris III married Giovanna of Savoy.

=== 1931 ===
- 21 June – Parliamentary elections were held in Bulgaria.

=== 1932 ===
- The Varna Aquarium was unveiled to the public.
- FC Lokomotiv Gorna Oryahovitsa, a Bulgarian association football club based in Gorna Oryahovitsa, was founded.

=== 1933 ===
- February 27 – Following the burning of Germany's parliament building, Bulgarian Communist Georgi Dimitrov is accused of co-conspiring in what the Nazi's claimed was arson. He was later acquitted.

=== 1934 ===
- The Bulgarian coup d'état of 1934 (also called the 19 May coup d'état) took place.
- The National Art Gallery of Bulgaria was established.

=== 1935 ===
- April 21 – Tsar Boris banned all political parties.

=== 1936 ===
- 1 March – Trud, a Bulgarian daily newspaper that is the largest in circulation and one of the oldest, released its first issue.

=== 1937 ===
- The Vakarel radio transmitter near Vakarel, Bulgaria was inaugurated.

=== 1938 ===
- 6 – 27 March – Parliamentary elections were held in Bulgaria.

=== 1939 ===
- 24 December – Parliamentary elections were held in Bulgaria.

== See also ==
- History of Bulgaria
- Timeline of Bulgarian history
