= Studia Etymologica Cracoviensia =

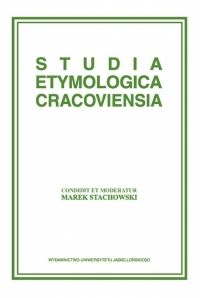
- Discipline: Historical linguistics
- Language: English, French, German
- Edited by: Marek Stachowski

Publication details
- History: 1996-2015
- Publisher: Cracow University (Poland)
- Frequency: Annually

Standard abbreviations
- ISO 4: Stud. Etymologica Crac.

Indexing
- ISSN: 1427-8219 (print); 2084-3836 (web)
- OCLC no.: 37359425

Links
- Journal homepage

Studia Etymologica Cracoviensia was an annual peer-reviewed academic journal covering historical linguistics on languages of Eurasia. The founder and the editor-in-chief was Marek Stachowski. It was established in 1996 and published by Cracow University. It operated until 2015.

The journal is abstracted and indexed in the Central and Eastern European Online Library, the Central European Journal of Social Sciences and Humanities, ProQuest, and EBSCO databases.

== Contents ==
The journal printed articles in English, German and French. The published contributions was mainly original articles. Some volumes contained a small number of reviews, as well as obituaries for prominent linguists. There was no preset limit for the length of an article.

Some volumes are thematic. Vols. 10 (2005) and 11 (2006) were a two-volume edition dedicated to the 170th anniversary of August Pott's seminal work, Etymologische Untersuchungen auf dem Gebiete der indo-germanischen Sprachen. Vol. 13 (2008) was mostly dedicated to etymology of proper names. Vol. 14 (2009) was in memoriam of the deceased member of the editorial staff, professor E. Helimski.
