= 1893 Bulgarian parliamentary election =

Parliamentary elections in Bulgaria

Parliamentary elections were held in Bulgaria on 30 July 1893. Following changes to the constitution earlier in the year, the number of members of the National Assembly was reduced.

The elections were marred by riots in Peshtera, where attempts were made to steal the ballot boxes and assault the presiding officer. Violence also occurred in Belogradchik, where attempts were made to prevent the polling station closing until supporters of one candidate had arrived. Voter turnout was low, largely due to indifference in rural areas where national politics was not considered of importance.
