= 1950s in Bulgaria =

The 1950s in the People's Republic of Bulgaria.

== Incumbents ==
- General Secretary of the Bulgarian Communist Party:
  - Valko Chervenkov (1949–1954)
  - Todor Zhivkov (1954–1989)
- Chairman of the Presidium:
  - Mincho Neychev (1947–1950)
  - Georgi Damyanov (1950–1958)
  - Georgi Kulishev (acting, 1958)
  - Nikolay Georgiev (acting, 1958)
  - Dimitar Ganev (1958–1964)
- Prime Minister of Bulgaria:
  - Vasil Kolarov (1949–1950)
  - Valko Chervenkov (1950–1956)
  - Anton Yugov (1956–1962)

== Events ==
=== 1950 ===
- October 14 – 22 – The 1950 Men's European Volleyball Championship, the second edition of the event, was hosted in Sofia.

=== 1951 ===
- 1 April – The Plovdiv derby, a derby in Bulgarian football between Botev Plovdiv and Lokomotiv Plovdiv, had its first match.

=== 1952 ===
- The Bulgarian Mint was established.
- Bulgaria competed at the 1952 Winter Olympics in Oslo, Norway.
- FC Minyor Radnevo, a Bulgarian football club from the town of Radnevo, was founded.

=== 1953 ===
- 20 December – Parliamentary elections were held in Bulgaria.
- Vasil Levski National Stadium, Bulgaria's second largest stadium, was officially opened.

=== 1954 ===
- The Ministry of Culture of Bulgaria became its own separate institution.
- FC Ravda 1954, a Bulgarian football club from the village of Ravda (near the city Nesebar), was established.

=== 1955 ===
- July 27 – El Al Flight 402, an international passenger flight from London to Tel Aviv via Vienna and Istanbul, strayed into Bulgarian airspace and was shot down by two Bulgarian MiG-15 jet fighters. It later crashed near Petrich, killing all 7 crew and 51 passengers on board. The crash took place amid highly strained relations between the Eastern Bloc and the West and was the deadliest involving the Constellation at the time.
- December 14 – United Nations Security Council Resolution 109 is adopted, leading to the admission of Bulgaria and other countries into the United Nations.

=== 1956 ===
- 13 December – Uzunbodzhak (also known as Ouzounboudjak and Lopushna), a UNESCO Biosphere Reserve, was established.
- The Nesebar Archaeological museum was founded.
- Spartak Sofia, an ice hockey team in Sofia, was founded.

=== 1957 ===
- 22 December – Parliamentary elections were held in Bulgaria.
- 7 November – The 1957 Bulgarian Cup Final (the 17th final of the Bulgarian Cup) was contested between Levski Sofia and Spartak Pleven at the Vasil Levski National Stadium in Sofia. Levski won the final 2–1.

=== 1958 ===
- The First English Language School was founded in Sofia.
- November 7 – The 1958 Bulgarian Cup Final (the 18th final of the Bulgarian Cup) was contested between Spartak Plovdiv and Minyor Pernik at the Vasil Levski National Stadium in Sofia. Spartak won the final 1–0.
- June 20 – 22 – The 1958 Wrestling World Cup was held in Sofia.

=== 1959 ===
- December 26 – The Bulgarian National Television (BNT) was founded in this year. It started broadcasting on this day.

== See also ==
- History of Bulgaria
- Timeline of Bulgarian history
