= 1946 Bulgarian census =

As of December 31, 1946, the population of the country was 7,029,349.

== Ethnic groups ==
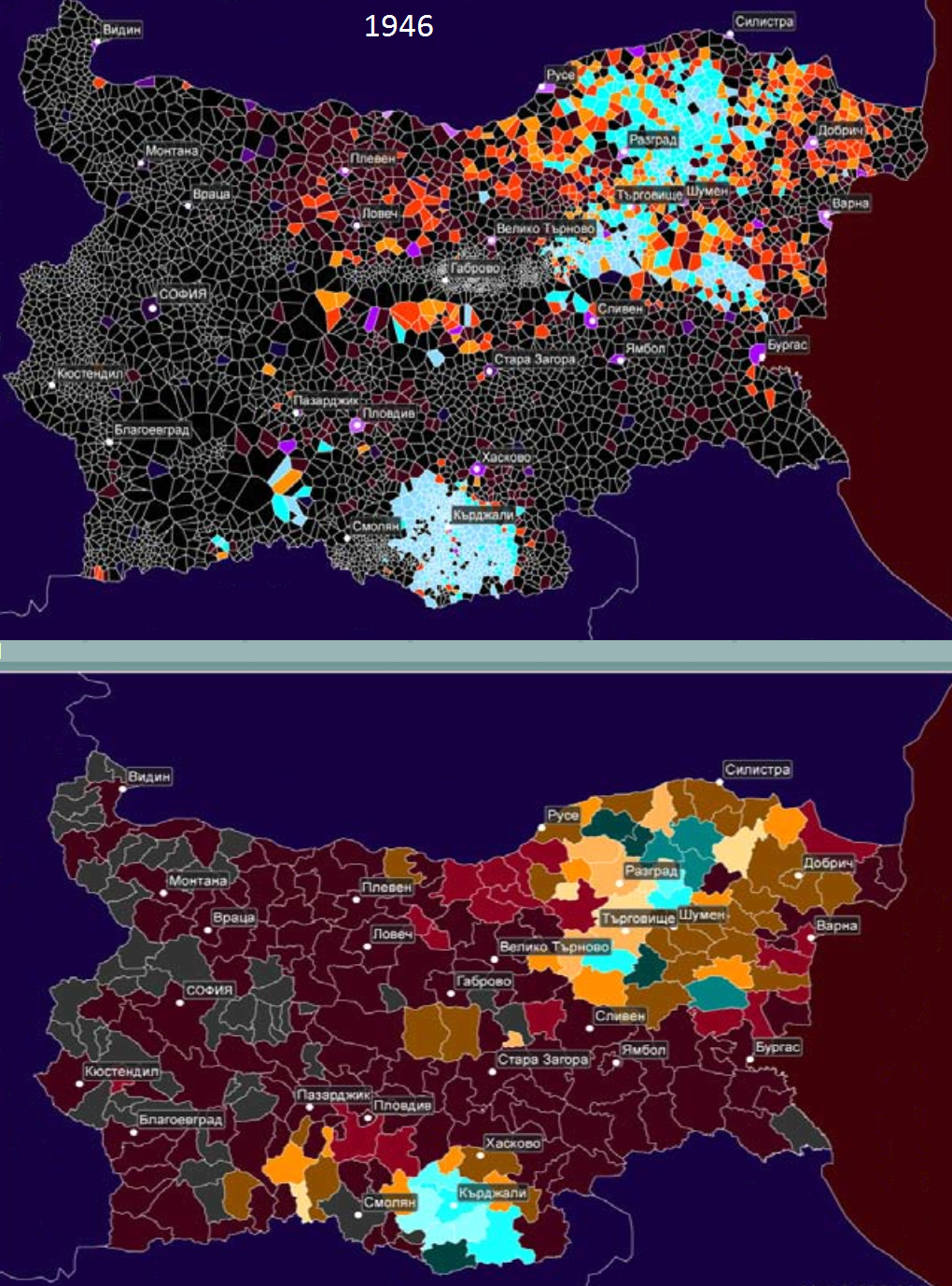
Share of Turks in town halls, compared to the territories of today's municipalities.

Number and share of ethnic groups.

Ethnicity	Numbers	%
Bulgarians	5,903,580	84.0
Turks	675,500	9.6
Roma	170,011	2.4
Macedonians	169,544	2.4
Jews	44,209	0.6
Armenians	21,637	0.3
Russians	13,200	0.2
Tatars	8,133	
Greeks	3,623	
Romanians	2,459	
Czechs	1,868	
Germans	1,407	
Albanians	1,128	
Hungarians	778	
Serbs	723	
Slovaks	656	
Italians	580	
Slovenes	545	
French	301	
Croats	290	
Poles	276	
Ukrainians	61	

Ethnicity (1946)
Bulgarians	84.0%
Turks	9.6%
Roma	2.4%
Macedonians	2.4%
Jews	0.6%
