= Marek Stachowski (linguist) =

Polish linguist

Marek Stachowski (born 1957) is a Polish linguist and etymologist specializing in Turkic languages, especially Yakut, Dolgan and Turkish. He is a professor at Jagiellonian University and the founding editor of the historical linguistics journal Studia Etymologica Cracoviensia.

He has published twelve books and more than 300 articles on Turkic, Mongolic, Yeniseian, Tungusic and some European languages. He publishes in English, German, Polish, Turkish and Russian.

== Main works ==
- Stachowski, Marek 1993. Dolganischer Wortschatz, Kraków, 264 p.
- Stachowski, Marek 1993. Geschichte des jakutischen Vokalismus. Kraków, 208 p.
- Stachowski, Marek 1995. Studien zum Wortschatz der jakutischen Übersetzung des Neuen Testaments, Kraków, 63 p.
- Stachowski, Marek 1997. Dolganische Wortbildung, Kraków, 124 p.
- Stachowski, Marek 1998. Dolganischer Wortschatz – Supplementband, Kraków, 282 p.
- Stachowski, Marek 1999. Konsonantenadaptation russischer Lehnwörter im Dolganischen, Kraków,

140 p.

- Stachowski, Marek 2007. Gramatyka języka tureckiego w zarysie, 1st edition, Kraków, 407 p.
- Stachowski, Marek 2009. Gramatyka języka tureckiego w zarysie, 2nd revised edition, Kraków,

407 p.

- Stachowski, Marek 2011. Etimoloji, Ankara, X + 118 p.
- Stachowski, Marek 2019. Kurzgefaßtes etymologisches Wörterbuch der türkischen Sprache, Kraków, 377 p.
- Stachowski, Marek 2023. Podstawy turkologii dla bałkanistów, Kraków, 238 p.
- Stachowski, Marek 2025. Turkologia, etymologia i ja (Wspomnienia wybrane), Kraków, 483 p.
- Stachowski, Marek 2025. Rumeli bilimine giriş. Türkçenin Balkanlar’daki izleri, 1st edition, İstanbul, 164 p.
- Stachowski, Marek 2026. Rumeli bilimine giriş. Türkçenin Balkanlar’daki izleri, 2nd edition, İstanbul, 164 p.
