= Rozhen National Folklore Fair =

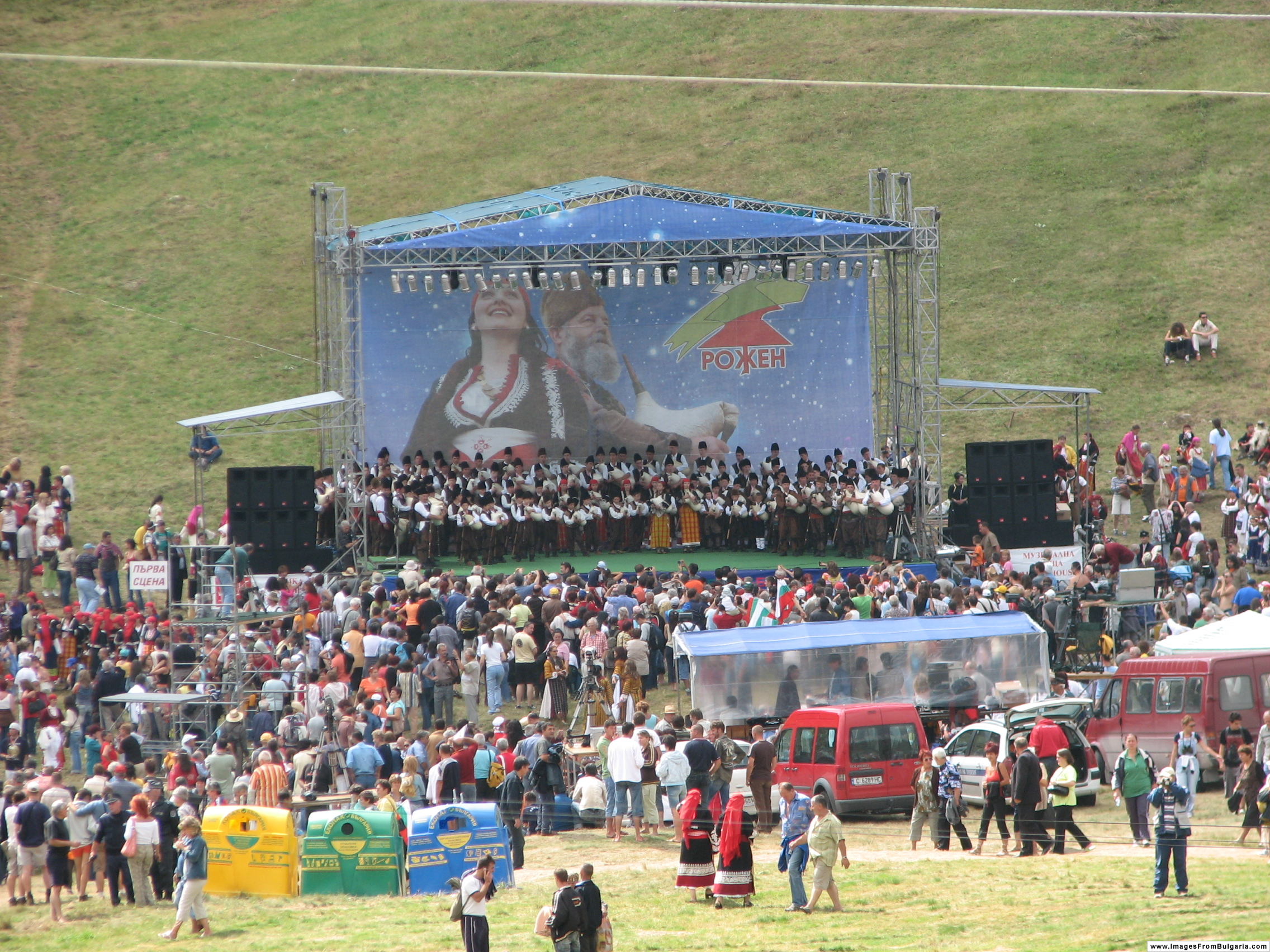
Rozhen National Folklore Fair 2006

The Rozhen National Folklore Fair (Bulgarian: Национален фолклорен събор „Рожен“, Natsionalen folkloren sabor „Rozhen“) is a major Bulgarian folklore fair that is held every four years on the meadows of the Rozhen area in Smolyan, Smolyan Province, of southern Bulgaria. The festival is a celebration of Bulgarian folk dance, singing, and artisanal crafts.

The first fair was held in 1898. At the time, the border between Bulgaria and the Ottoman Empire ran through Rozhen Peak, and Bulgarians from neighbouring villages on both sides of the border would gather. Initially, the fair was annual, and took place every year with the exception of 1901, 1903, 1906 and 1907.

After 1912, when the Rhodopes were liberated from Ottoman rule, the fair lost its political importance, but nevertheless remained a symbol of freedom, Bulgarian unity and traditions. Initially only targeted at Rhodopean music and dances, the fair later became a nationwide event, a festival and a singing competition at once, as well as the largest folk song festival in the country. The peak was in 1972, when 3,500 musicians and dancers participated (of which 300 gaida players) and the audience reached 150,000.

The fair is traditionally opened with the Bela Sam Bela Yunache („Бела съм бела юначе“) song, the unofficial anthem of the Rhodopes, and reaches its climax with the Zvezden Rozhen („Звезден Рожен“; "Starry Rozhen") performance, when, on the evening of the first day, under the stars, the most prominent Rhodopean singers perform the best known songs from the region.

== Gallery ==
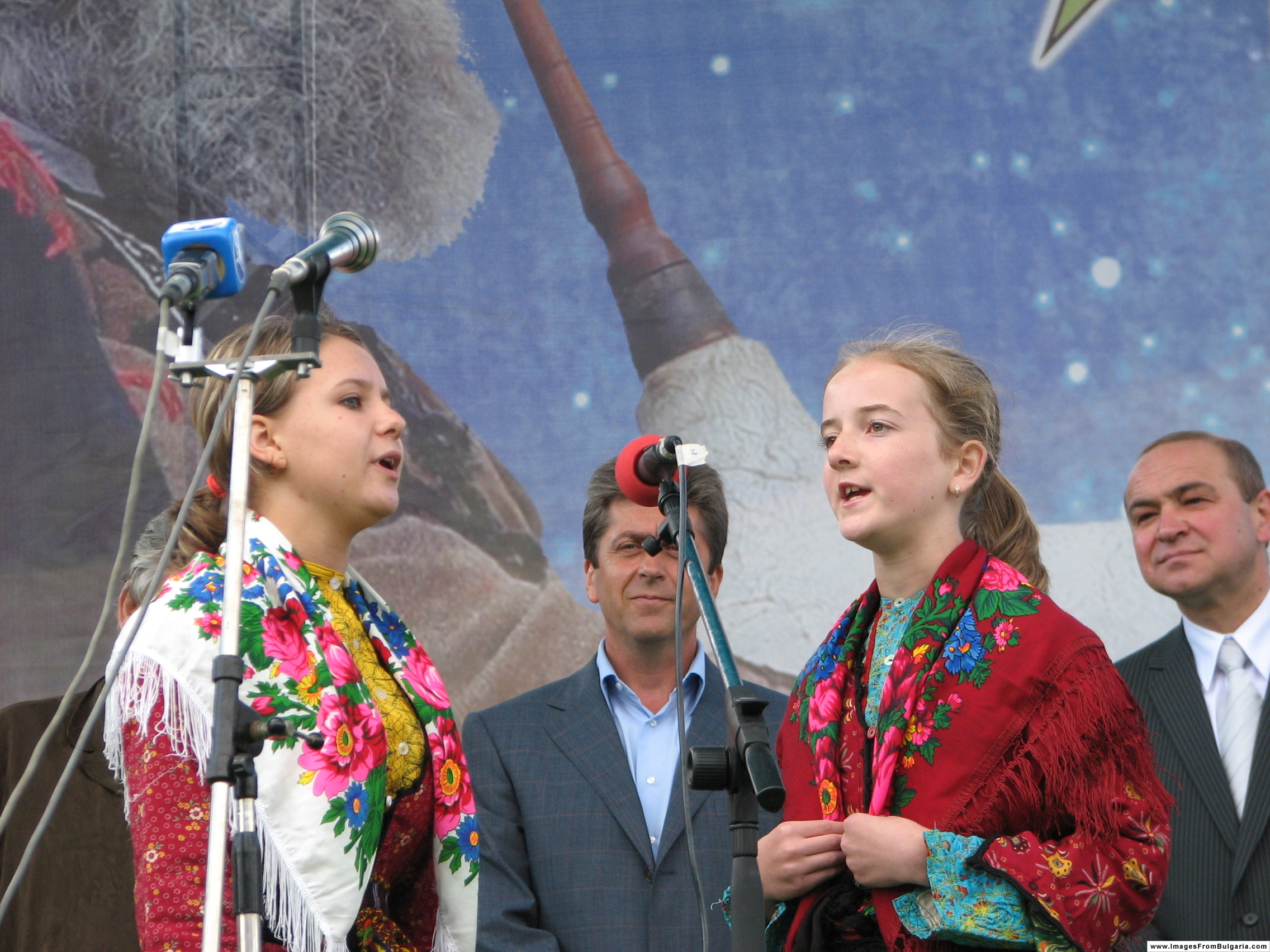
Girls singing (President of Bulgaria Georgi Parvanov is in the background in the centre)

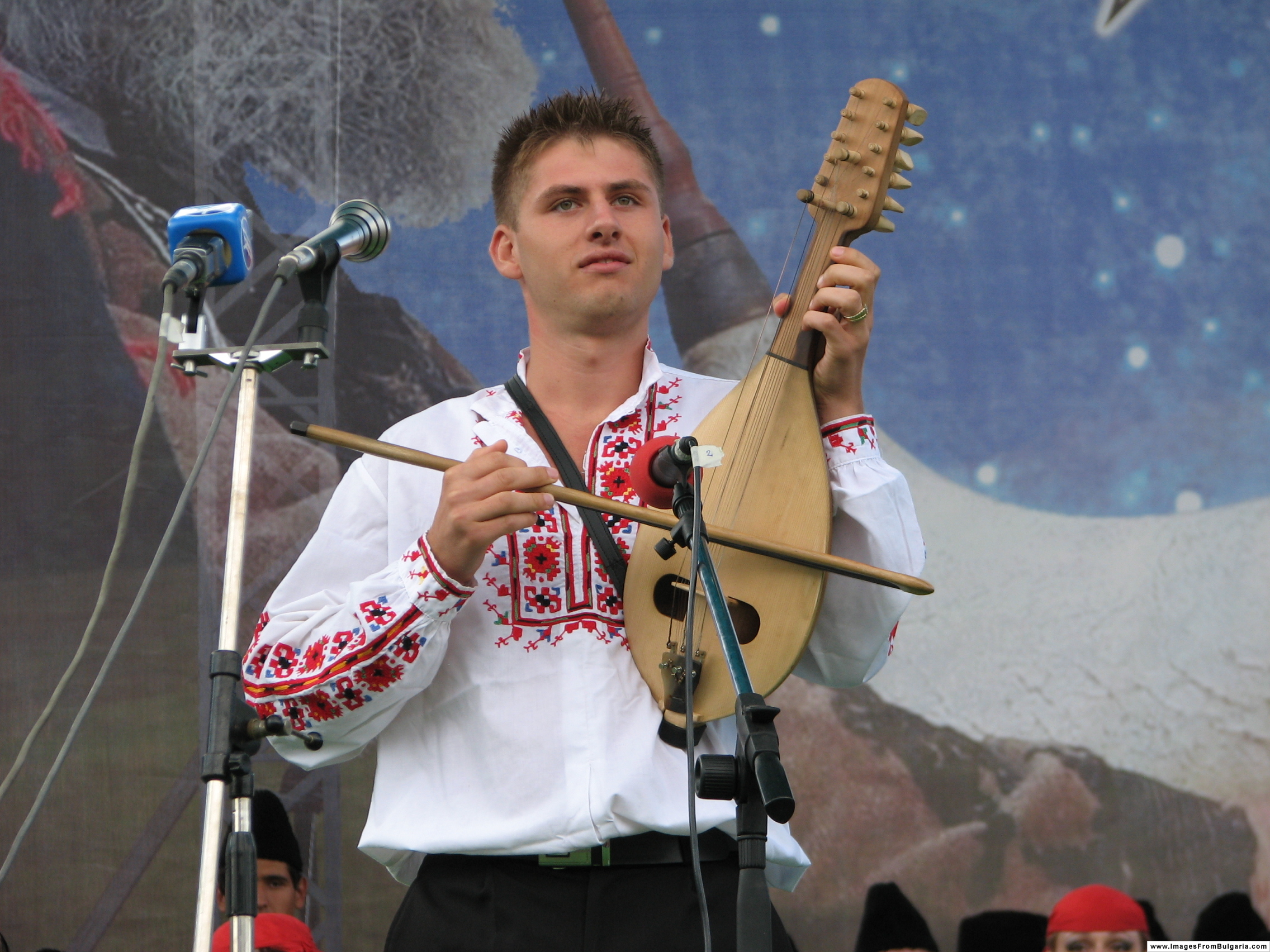
A boy playing the folk string instrument gadulka

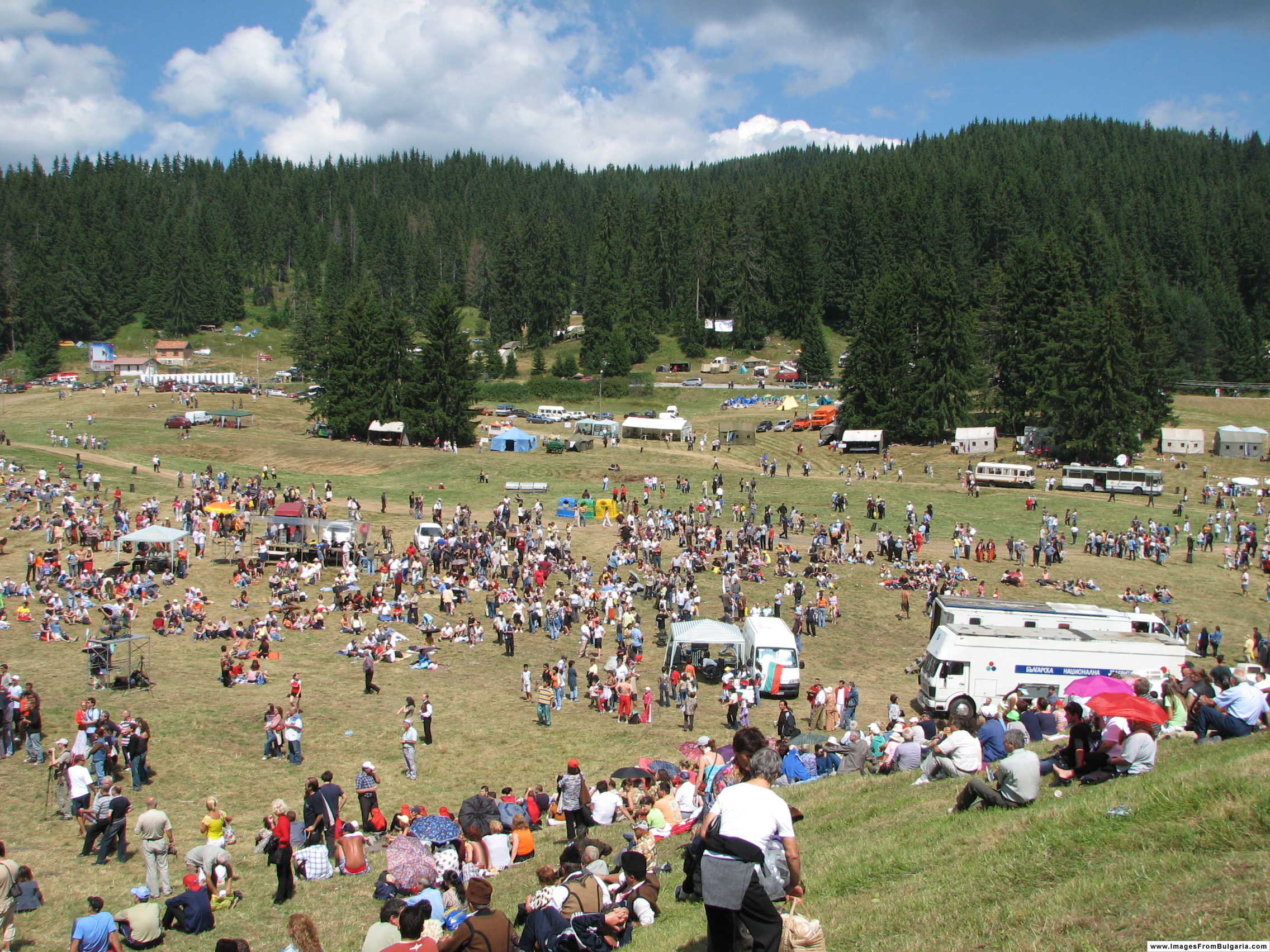
Overview of the Rozhen Meadows crowded with people during the fair
