= Sportklub Sofia =

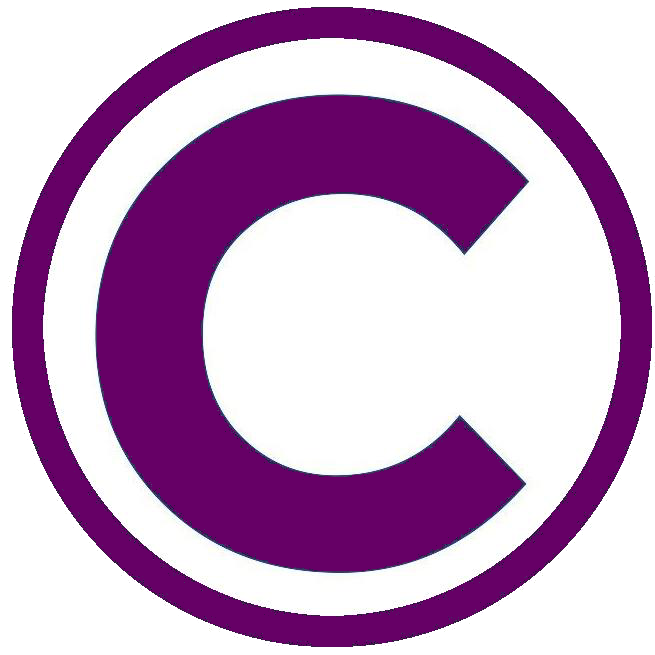
- Full name: Спортклуб София; Sportclub Sofia
- Nickname: Моравите (The Purples)
- Founded: 1 December 1912; 113 years ago
- Dissolved: 5 November 1944; 81 years ago
- Ground: Sportklub Stadium; Sofia, Bulgaria
Home colours	Away colours

Sportklub Sofia (Bulgarian: Спортклуб София) is a defunct Bulgarian sports club based in Sofia. During its existence it won the Bulgarian Championship once, in 1935.

== History ==
The club was formed as SC Karavelov on 1 December 1912 in honour of Lyuben Karavelov, a Bulgarian writer and an important figure of the Bulgarian National Revival.

During 1919 to September 1920 the club was merged with Slavia Sofia. However, misunderstanding in the management of both clubs let to the separation of the team. The club was then renamed to Sportklub Sofia, as suggested by Aleksandar Vazov, nephew of Ivan Vazov. Aleksandar, who as a student in Germany used to play for Sportclub Berlin, known today as Hertha BSC. With the establishment of Communist rule in Bulgaria after WWII, significant changes took place affecting all leading clubs without exception. On 5 November 1944, Sportklub Sofia was merged with Sokol Sofia and Vazrazhdane Sofia and a new club was founded on Sportklub Sofia's basis – Septemvri Sofia, who is also its official descendant.

== Honours ==
Bulgarian State Football Championship:

- Winners: 1935
