= 2007 in Bulgaria =

- Decades: 1980s; 1990s; 2000s; 2010s; 2020s
- See also: Other events of 2007; Timeline of Bulgarian history

Events from the year 2007 in Bulgaria

== Incumbents ==
- President: Georgi Parvanov
- Prime Minister: Sergei Stanishev
- Speaker: Georgi Pirinski

== Events ==
=== January ===
- January 1: The Bulgarian political party Citizens for European Development of Bulgaria, which had only been founded on 2006-12-03 by Sofia mayor Boyko Borisov, instantly comes second in a public poll on party support, trailing only the Bulgarian Socialist Party.
- January 1: Bulgaria and Romania join the European Union.

=== March ===
- March 15: Russia, Greece and Bulgaria sign a deal to build a pipeline to transport Russian oil to the Greek port of Alexandroupolis.

=== May ===
- May 20: Bulgaria elects Members of the European Parliament for the first time, the three top parties each possibly receiving five deputies. The narrow winner of the elections is the opposition Citizens for European Development of Bulgaria.

=== July ===
- July 10: The Gadhafi Foundation announces a deal has been reached with families of more than 400 children infected with HIV in the case of five Bulgarian nurses and a Palestinian doctor.
- July 11: The Supreme Court of Libya upholds the death penalty for the six Bulgarian medics and one Palestinian doctor accused of infecting children with HIV.
- July 12: Cécilia Sarkozy, the wife of French President Nicolas Sarkozy, flies to Libya and visits the Bulgarian medics condemned to death for allegedly infecting children with HIV and also the families of the infected children. She will also meet Colonel Muammar al-Gaddafi, the President of Libya.
- July 24: The 5 Bulgarian nurses and the Palestinian assistant, imprisoned in Libya for 8 years and that had been sentenced to death, in several trials based on allegations of having inoculated AIDS to children, are leaving Libya and returning to Sofia with Mrs Cécilia Sarkozy who negotiated their liberation.
- July 27: A Serbian gunman kills at least nine people in the village of Jabukovac in eastern Serbia, near the Bulgarian border.

=== August ===
- August 25: On the 132-year anniversary of the first crossing, Bulgarian swimmer Petar Stoychev becomes the fastest person ever to swim across the English Channel.

=== October ===
- October 19: EU leaders agree in Lisbon that the transcription "eвро" (evro) will be used in Bulgarian translations of the euro in official EU documents.
- October 19: Leaders of the European Union reach agreement on the Lisbon Treaty following last-minute concessions to Poland, Italy and Bulgaria.

== Deaths ==
- April 17 — Steven Derounian (89), Republican Representative from New York state (1953–1965)
- August 1 — Sergei Antonov (59), accused of involvement in attempt by Mehmet Ali Ağca to kill Pope John Paul II

== See also ==
- 2007 in the European Union
- 2007 in Europe
