= 2008 in Bulgaria =

- Decades: 1980s; 1990s; 2000s; 2010s; 2020s
- See also: Other events of 2008; Timeline of Bulgarian history

Events in the year 2008 in Bulgaria.

== Incumbents ==
- President: Georgi Parvanov
- Prime Minister: Sergei Stanishev

== Events ==
- September – The European Commission permanently strips Bulgaria of half of the aid frozen in July over what it says is the government's failure to tackle corruption and organised crime.

== Deaths ==
- 13 September – Konstantin Pavlov, screenwriter, author and poet (b. 1933).
