= 1992 Bulgarian census =

The population census in Bulgaria in 1992 was conducted on December 4, by the National Statistical Institute (NSI). It was accompanied by a study of the processes of restitution, privatization and the progress of the agrarian reform. A survey of employment and unemployment was conducted. The census was carried out in accordance with a decision of the National Assembly from 1992.

As of December 4, 1992, the country's population was 8,487,317, of which 4,170,622 (49.1%) were men and 4,316,695 (50.9%) were women. The population in cities was 5,704,552 (67.2%), and in villages it was 2,782,765 (32.8%).

== Results ==
=== Ethnic composition ===
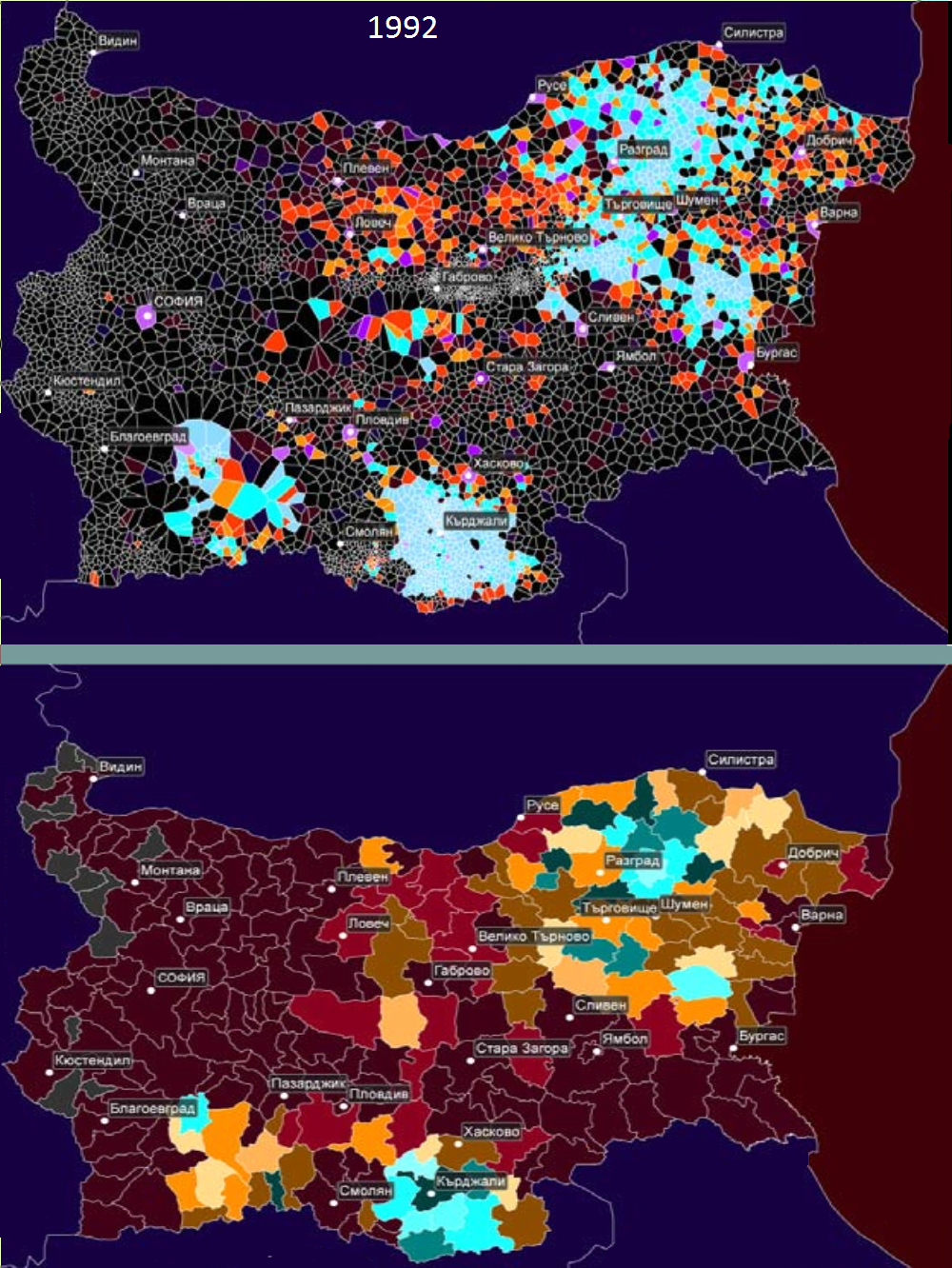
Proportion of Turks by townships compared to the territories of today's municipalities.

Number and percentage of the population by ethnic group:

Ethnic group	Number	Percentage
Total	8,487,317	100.00
Bulgarians	7,271,185	85.67
Turks	800,052	9.42
Romani	313,396	3.69
Other	94,203	1.10
Undefined	8,481	0.09

=== Religion ===
Number and percentage of the population by religion:

Religion	Number	Percentage
Total	8,487,317	100.00
Eastern Orthodox	7,274,592	85.71
Islam	1,110,295	13.08
Catholicism	53,074	0.62
Protestantism	21,878	0.25
Armenian-Gregorian Church	9,672	0.11
Judaism	2,580	0.03
Other	15,226	0.17
Undefined	–	–

=== Economic activity ===
Population by ethnic group and economic activity:

Ethnic group	Общо	Economic activity				Not shown
Ethnic group	Общо	Economically active			Economically inactive	Not shown
Ethnic group	Общо	Everything	Busy	Unemployed	Economically inactive	Not shown
Bulgaria	8,487,317	3,932,468	3,286,655	645,813	4,546,368	8,481
Bulgarians	7,271,185	3,354,542	2,871,029	483,513	3,916,643	–
Turks	800,052	394,260	295,526	98,734	405,792	–
Romanis	313,396	138,252	84,120	54,132	175,144	–

=== Education ===
Population aged 7 and over by ethnic group and education:

Ethnic group	Total	Education						Unfinished	Illiterate	Not shown
Ethnic group	Total	Higher education	Bachelor's degree	Secondary school (special)	Secondary school	Primary school	Elementary school	Unfinished	Illiterate	Not shown
Bulgaria	7,797,602	619,294	266,907	1,311,652	1,309,585	2,370,214	1,231,727	527,392	152,955	7876
Bulgarians	6,735,540	602,204	258,077	1,253,549	1,20,742	1,978,680	969,696	395,113	64,479	–
Turks	708,107	2,798	5,523	38,416	73,527	287,891	171,741	75,612	52,599	–
Romanis	257,840	464	274	4,210	8,514	83,410	80,179	51,892	28,897	–
Other	88,239	13,828	3,033	15,477	18,802	20,233	10,111	4,775	1,980	–

== See also ==
- Demographics of Bulgaria
