= 1970s in Bulgaria =

The 1970s in the People's Republic of Bulgaria.

== Incumbents ==
- General Secretary of the Bulgarian Communist Party: Todor Zhivkov (1954–1989)
- Chairman of the Presidium: Georgi Traykov (1964–1971)
- Chairman of the State Council: Todor Zhivkov (1971–1989)
- Prime Minister of Bulgaria:
  - Todor Zhivkov (1962–1971)
  - Stanko Todorov (1971–1981)

== Events ==
=== 1970 ===
- 26 February – Rusenski Lom Nature Park, a protected area in northern Bulgaria in the Ivanovo Municipality of the Ruse Province, was established.
- September 29 – October 12 – The 1970 FIVB Volleyball Men's World Championship, the seventh edition of the tournament, was held in Sofia, Bulgaria.

=== 1971 ===
- 18 May – The Zhivkov Constitution (which was the third Constitution of Bulgaria and the second of the Communist era) came into effect.
- June 19 – 27 – The 1971 European Weightlifting Championships, the 50th edition of the event, were held at the Universiada Hall in Sofia, Bulgaria. There were 123 participants from 23 nations.

=== 1972 ===
- The 1972 European Women Basketball Championship, commonly called EuroBasket Women 1972, was held in Bulgaria. The Soviet Union won the gold medal, Bulgaria won the silver medal, and Czechoslovakia won the bronze medal.

=== 1973 ===
- 3 March – Balkan Bulgarian Airlines Flight 307, a scheduled international passenger flight from Sofia to Moscow, crashed on its final approach to Moscow's Sheremetyevo Airport killing all 25 passengers and crew on board.

=== 1974 ===
- Diana Express, a Bulgarian rock band, is formed by Mitko Shterev in Yambol.
- The 18th Artistic Gymnastics World Championships were held in the city of Varna. This was the first world championships at which the individual all-around titles were contested in a separate session of competition, rather than being decided after the team competition.
- FC Parva Atomna Kozloduy, a Bulgarian football club from the town of Kozloduy, is founded.

=== 1975 ===
- FSB, an influential Bulgarian progressive rock band, was formed in Sofia as a studio project.

=== 1976 ===
- 30 May – Parliamentary elections were held in Bulgaria.
- 8 September – Construction on the Asparuhov Bridge was completed.

=== 1977 ===
- 4 March – The Vrancea/Svishtov earthquake occurs, leading to the collapse of three blocks of flats in the Bulgarian town of Svishtov (near Zimnicea) and the deaths of more than 100 people.
- The 1977 Canoe Sprint World Championships are held in Sofia, Bulgaria.

=== 1978 ===
- 16 March – A Balkan Bulgarian Airlines Tupolev Tu-134 airliner crashes near the village of Gabare (130 km northeast of Sofia) on an international flight from Sofia, Bulgaria, to Warsaw Airport, Poland, killing all 73 on board.

=== 1979 ===
- The Neolithic Dwellings Museum in Stara Zagora, Bulgaria, was built.

== See also ==
- History of Bulgaria
- Timeline of Bulgarian history
