= 1990s in Bulgaria =

The 1990s in the People's Republic of Bulgaria (until November 1990) and the Republic of Bulgaria (from November 1990).

== Incumbents ==
=== People's Republic of Bulgaria ===
- General Secretary of the Bulgarian Communist Party: Petar Mladenov (1989–1990)
- Chairman of the State Council: Petar Mladenov (1989–1990)
- Chairman of the Republic:
  - Petar Mladenov (1990)
  - Stanko Todorov (1990)
  - Nikolai Todorov (1990)
  - Zhelyu Zhelev (1990)
- Prime Minister of Bulgaria:
  - Georgi Atanasov (1986–1990)
  - Andrey Lukanov (1990)

=== Republic of Bulgaria ===
- President of Bulgaria:
  - Zhelyu Zhelev (1990–1997)
  - Petar Stoyanov (1997–2002)
- Prime Minister of Bulgaria:
  - Andrey Lukanov (1990)
  - Dimitar Iliev Popov (1990–1991)
  - Philip Dimitrov (1991–1992)
  - Lyuben Berov (1992–1994)
  - Reneta Indzhova (1994–1995)
  - Zhan Videnov (1995–1997)
  - Stefan Sofiyanski (1997)
  - Ivan Kostov (1997–2001)

== Events ==
=== 1990 ===
- 10 June – Constitutional Assembly elections were held in Bulgaria.

=== 1991 ===
- January 22–27 – The 1991 European Figure Skating Championships was a senior-level international competition held in Sofia, Bulgaria.

=== 1992 ===
- 12 – 19 January – The first direct presidential elections were held in Bulgaria. Incumbent President Zhelyu Zhelev of the Union of Democratic Forces won 52.8% of the vote in the second round.
- 4 December - The national census is conducted, providing a population of 8,487,317 people.

=== 1994 ===
- The International Commission for the Protection of the Danube River (ICPDR), an organisation established by the Danube River Protection Convention, was signed by the Danube countries in Sofia, Bulgaria.

=== 1995 ===
- 1 April – The first episode of the Bulgarian television comedy Kanaleto is broadcast on Bulgarian National Television.

=== 1996 ===
- May 25 – King Simeon returned to Bulgaria.

=== 1997 ===
- 19 April – Parliamentary elections were held in Bulgaria.

=== 1998 ===
- 18 – 25 April – The 16th European Badminton Championships were held in Sofia, Bulgaria and were hosted by the European Badminton Union and the Bulgarian Badminton Federation.

=== 1999 ===
- Protracted demolition attempts on the marble mausoleum of the first communist leader Georgi Dimitrov become national joke.
- Duet Mania, a Bulgarian pop duet is formed in Sofia.

== Deaths ==
- 1990
  - January 17 – Panka Pelishek, pianist and music teacher (b. 1899).
- 1991
  - July 6 – Anton Yugov, prime minister (1956–1962)
- 1993
  - 28 June – Boris Christoff, bass singer (b. 1914).
- 1994
  - November 2 – Grisha Filipov, prime minister (1981–1986)
- 1996
  - October 2 – Andrey Lukanov, prime minister (1990)
  - December 17 – Stanko Todorov, prime minister (1971–1981)
- 1998
  - August 5 – Todor Zhivkov, head of state (1954–1989).

== See also ==
- History of Bulgaria
- Timeline of Bulgarian history
