= 2025 in Bulgaria =

- Decades: 2000s; 2010s; 2020s
- See also: Other events of 2025; Timeline of Bulgarian history

Events in the year 2025 in Bulgaria.

== Incumbents ==
- President: Rumen Radev
- Prime Minister: Dimitar Glavchev (until 16 January); Rosen Zhelyazkov (16 January onwards)

== Events ==
=== January ===
- 1 January – Bulgaria and Romania fully join the Schengen Area.
- 16 January – The National Assembly approves a coalition government between GERB, the BSP and the ITN led by Prime Minister Rosen Zhelyazkov of GERB.

=== February ===
- 6 February – The National Assembly votes against a bill from the pro-Russian Vazrazhdane party on foreign-funded NGOs. The bill is rejected after 112 MPs vote against, 38 support it and 48 abstain.
- 22 February – A door at the Sofia branch of the European Commission is set on fire by protesters organized by the pro-Russian Vazrazhdane party demonstrating against Bulgaria's adoption of the euro.
- 26 February – The Constitutional Court of Bulgaria orders a recount of votes cast in the October 2024 Bulgarian parliamentary election after voting discrepancies are found in half of polling stations sampled as part of an audit.

=== March ===
- 14 March – The 51st National Assembly of Bulgaria is reconvened with adjustments made following the recount, which sees the Velichie party entering parliament.

=== April ===
- 3 April – The Zhelzyazkov government survives a no-confidence motion filed by Vazrazhdane in the National Assembly.
- 17 April – The Zhelzyazkov government survives a no-confidence motion filed by MECh in the National Assembly.

=== June ===
- 4 June – The European Union approves Bulgaria's adoption of the euro, becoming the 21st member state of the eurozone effective 1 January 2026.

=== July ===
- 20 July – Authorities seize a van at the border with Turkey in Haskovo Province carrying nearly 206 kilograms of cocaine valued at 20 million euros ($22 million) and arrest three people on board, including a Congolese diplomat stationed in Belgium, in what is the largest such seizure in Bulgaria's land orders.

=== August ===
- 31 August – An aircraft carrying European Commission President Ursula von der Leyen is subjected to suspected GPS jamming blamed on Russia, forcing it to land at Plovdiv Airport.

=== September ===
- 15 September – Authorities announce the arrest in Vasil Levski Sofia Airport of Igor Grechushki, the Russian owner of the cargo vessel that delivered a shipment of ammonium nitrate to Lebanon that caused the 2020 Beirut explosion.
- 28 September – Bulgaria finishes in second place at 21st FIVB Volleyball Men's World Championship in the Philippines after losing to Italy in four sets (25–21, 25–17, 17–25, 25–10).

=== October ===
- 3 October – Two people are killed in flooding caused by heavy rains in Elenite.
- 28 October – German arms manufacturer Rheinmetall and Bulgarian VMZ Sopot sign an agreement to build a gunpowder and ammunitions factory in Sopot, Plovdiv Province.

=== November ===
- 6 November – A van carrying migrants plunges into a lake after being chased by police near Burgas, killing six passengers and injuring four others.
- 7 November – The National Assembly passes a law allowing the Bulgarian state to take control of the Lukoil Neftohim Burgas oil refinery operated by the Russian petroleum firm Lukoil amid impending US sanctions against the plant.
- 27 November – The government withdraws its proposed budget for 2026 following massive protests against proposed tax increases.

=== December ===
- 1 December – 2025 Bulgarian budget protests: Tens of thousands of people gather in Sofia and other cities across the country to protest against government corruption and the proposed 2026 budget and calls for members of prime minister Rosen Zhelyazkov's cabinet to resign.
- 10 December – A court in Sofia rejects an extradition request by Lebanon for Igor Grechushki, the Russian owner of the cargo vessel that delivered a shipment of ammonium nitrate to Lebanon that caused the 2020 Beirut explosion.
- 11 December – 2025 Bulgarian budget protests: Rosen Zhelyazkov resigns as prime minister.

== Art and entertainment ==
- List of Bulgarian submissions for the Academy Award for Best International Feature Film

== Holidays ==
- 1 January – New Year's Day
- 3 March – Liberation Day
- 18 April – Orthodox Good Friday
- 19–21 April – Orthodox Easter
- 1 May – Labour Day
- 6 May – Armed Forces Day and Saint George's Day
- 24 May – Bulgarian Education and Culture, and Slavic Script Day
- 6 September – Unification Day
- 22 September – Independence Day
- 1 November – Day of the Bulgarian Enlighteners
- 24 December – Christmas Eve
- 25–26 December – Christmas Days

== Deaths ==
- 2 July – Verka Siderova, 99, folk singer.
- 6 August – Krastyo Ralenkov, 60, poet.
- 10 August – Tatyana Chervenyakova, 71, physician.
- 16 August – Mincho Panayotov, 80, painter.
- 3 December – Naĭden Vŭlchev, 98, poet and translator.
