= 2026 in Bulgaria =

- Decades: 2000s; 2010s; 2020s
- See also: Other events of 2026; Timeline of Bulgarian history

Events in the year 2026 in Bulgaria.

== Incumbents ==
- President: Rumen Radev (until 23 January); Iliana Iotova (since 23 January)
- Prime Minister: Rosen Zhelyazkov (until 12 February); Andrey Gurov (12 February to 8 May); Rumen Radev (from 8 May)

== Events ==
=== January ===
- 1 January – Adoption of the euro.
- 19 January – President Rumen Radev announces his resignation effective 23 January.
- 23 January – Iliana Iotova becomes the first female president of Bulgaria following Rumen Radev's resignation.

=== February ===
- 1 February – The end of circulation of the Bulgarian lev.
- 11 February – President Iotova nominates Andrey Gurov, the deputy governor of the Bulgarian National Bank, as caretaker prime minister. He is formally appointed the next day.

=== April ===
- 19 April – 2026 Bulgarian parliamentary election: The Progressive Bulgaria coalition led by former president Rumen Radev wins a plurality of 44.6% of votes in elections to the National Assembly.

=== May ===
- 8 May – Rumen Radev is formally elected as prime minister by the National Assembly.
- 16 May – Bulgaria's Dara wins Eurovision 2026 in Austria with the single "Bangaranga", making her the first contestant from Bulgaria to win the Eurovision Song Contest.

=== June ===
- 9 June – The Radev government announces that it would stop supplying weapons to Ukraine.

=== July ===
- 17 July – The Monument to Vasil Levski in Targovishte is officially opened.
- 22 July – The National Assembly approves the stationing of an American aerial refueling tanker at Bezmer Air Base.

=== August ===
- 8 August – A drone that originated from Romania explodes near a section of the Trans-Balkan pipeline in the vicinity of the Kardam border crossing.
- 10–16 August – 2026 Men's European U-20 Water Polo Championship in Varna.

=== September ===
- 9–26 September – 2026 Men's European Volleyball Championship in Bulgaria, Finland, Italy and Romania.

=== October ===
- 3 October – Greece repatriates the remains of Samuel of Bulgaria, which were previously stored in Thessaloniki, to Sofia.
- 25 October – 2026 Bulgarian presidential election (first round): No candidate wins a majority in the first round, with incumbent president Iliana Iotova winning 35% of the vote against Andrey Gurov with 32%.

=== November ===
- 1 November – 2026 Bulgarian presidential election (second round): Iliana Iotova is elected to full term as president.
- 3 November – Two passenger aircraft traveling from Bergamo and Dublin are searched upon landing at Sofia Airport after being subjected to bomb threats that are subsequently found to be false.
- 5 November – Several passenger aircraft flying to Bulgaria are searched upon landing at Sofia and Plovdiv after being subjected to bomb threats that are subsequently found to be false.
- 10 November – Two pileups caused by fog along the Trakia motorway near Zimnitsa, Yambol Province leave 12 dead and 50 injured.

== Art and entertainment ==
- List of Bulgarian submissions for the Academy Award for Best International Feature Film

== Holidays ==
- 1 January – New Year's Day
- 3 March – Liberation Day
- 10 April – Orthodox Good Friday
- 11–13 April – Orthodox Easter
- 1 May – Labour Day
- 6 May – Armed Forces Day and Saint George's Day
- 24 May – Bulgarian Education and Culture, and Slavic Script Day
- 6 September – Unification Day
- 22 September – Independence Day
- 1 November – Day of the Bulgarian Enlighteners
- 24 December – Christmas Eve
- 25–26 December – Christmas Days

== Deaths ==
- 3 January – Dimitar Penev, 80, football player (CSKA Sofia, national team) and manager (national team)
- 16 March – Elza Goeva, 97, painter.
- 28 April – Vasko Boev, 37, football player (Spartak Varna, Kaliakra Kavarna, Dobrudzha Dobrich)
- 2 June – Lyuben Dilov Jr., 61, writer and journalist, MP (2005–2009, since 2021).
- 10 July – Aleksandr Panayotov Aleksandrov, 74, cosmonaut (Mir EP-2).
- 6 September – Hristo Spasov, 38, footballer (Chepinets, Naftex, Bansko).
- 24 October – Slavcho Binev, 60, MEP (2007–2014).
- 6 November –
  - Vezhdi Rashidov, 74, sculptor, minister of culture (2009–2013, 2014–2017) and chairman of the National Assembly (2022–2023).
  - Konstantin Trenchev, 71, founder and president of the Confederation of Labour Podkrepa (since 1989).
