= 2024 in Bulgaria =

- Decades: 2000s; 2010s; 2020s
- See also: Other events of 2024; Timeline of Bulgarian history

Events in the year 2024 in Bulgaria.

== Incumbents ==
- President: Rumen Radev
- Prime Minister: Nikolay Denkov (until 9 April); Dimitar Glavchev (since 9 April)

== Events ==
=== January ===
- 8–14 January – 2024 IIHF World Women's U18 Championship Division II B at Sofia

=== March ===
- 13 March – Bulgarian Patriarch Neophyte dies in Sofia at the age of 78.
- 31 March – Bulgaria and Romania partially join the Schengen Area, allowing travel by air and sea without border checks, Austria vetoed travel by land without border checks over fears that non-EU citizens could get easier access to the European Union.
- 31 March – Customs agents seize 403 kilograms (about 887 pounds) of heroin valued at 8.5 million euros ($9 million) from a truck traveling from Iran to Western Europe at the Kapitan Andreevo border crossing with Turkey.

=== June ===
- 6–9 June – 2024 European Parliament election: GERB emerges as the largest party in the Bulgarian contingent to the European Parliament.
- 9 June – June 2024 Bulgarian parliamentary election: No party attains a majority in the National Assembly, with GERB attaining a plurality of seats.
- 30 June – The Bulgarian Orthodox Church elects Metropolitan Daniel of Vidin, a member of the pro-Russian faction among the church's senior clergy, as Patriarch of All Bulgaria.

=== July ===
- 3 July – The National Assembly votes 138-98 to reject a proposed GERB-SDS minority government to be headed by former parliamentary speaker Rosen Zhelyazkov.

=== August ===
- 7 August – The National Assembly votes in favor of a legislative amendment banning the teaching of LGBTQ related topics in schools.
- 12 August – Authorities announce the seizure of 436 kilograms of heroin valued at 35 million euros from a trailer in the port of Burgas that originated from Kyrgyzstan via Georgia.

=== September ===
- 13 September – An Aero L-39 Albatros trainer jet of the Bulgarian Air Force crashes during a rehearsal for an airshow near Graf Ignatievo Air Base, killing its two pilots.

=== October ===
- 27 October – October 2024 Bulgarian parliamentary election: No party attains a majority in the National Assembly, with GERB attaining a plurality of seats.

=== December ===
- 12 December – The European Union grants Bulgaria and Romania full entry to the Schengen Area beginning in 2025.
- 15 December – Authorities seize 190 kilograms of cocaine valued at $7 million from a cargo ship that had docked in the port of Burgas from Peru.
- 20 December – One person is killed in an avalanche in the Pirin.

== Deaths ==
- 19 January – Georgi Kostov, composer and politician
- 2 February – Stefan Yanev, football player and writer
- 18 March – Angel Marin, Vice President of Bulgaria (2002–2012)
- 7 December – Doychin Vasilev, mountaineer and filmmaker, stroke.
- 16 December – Margarita Mihneva, journalist and television presenter, cancer.

== Art and entertainment ==
- List of Bulgarian submissions for the Academy Award for Best International Feature Film

== Holidays ==
- 1 January – New Year's Day
- 3 March – Liberation Day
- 1 May – Labour Day
- 3 May – Orthodox Good Friday
- 4–6 May – Orthodox Easter
- 6 May – Armed Forces Day and Saint George's Day
- 24 May – Bulgarian Education and Culture, and Slavic Script Day
- 6 September – Unification Day
- 22 September – Independence Day
- 1 November – Day of the Bulgarian Enlighteners
- 24 December – Christmas Eve
- 25–26 December – Christmas Days

== See also ==
- List of years in Bulgaria
