= 2027 in Bulgaria =

- Decades: 2000s; 2010s; 2020s
- See also: Other events of 2027; Timeline of Bulgarian history

Events in the year 2027 in Bulgaria.

== Events ==
=== Predicted and scheduled events ===
- May – Eurovision Song Contest 2027 in Bulgaria.
- TBA – 2027 Women's Ice Hockey World Championships Division III Group B in Sofia

== Holidays ==
- 1 January – New Year's Day
- 3 March – Liberation Day
- 30 April – Orthodox Good Friday
- 1 May – Labour Day
- 1–3 May – Orthodox Easter
- 6 May – Armed Forces Day and Saint George's Day
- 24 May – Bulgarian Education and Culture, and Slavic Script Day
- 6 September – Unification Day
- 22 September – Independence Day
- 1 November – Day of the Bulgarian Enlighteners
- 24 December – Christmas Eve
- 25–26 December – Christmas Days
