= Public holidays in Bulgaria =

The official public holidays in Bulgaria are listed in the table below.

Date	Holiday	Official name (Bulgarian)	Notes
1 January	New Year's Day	Нова година	
3 March	Liberation Day	Ден на Освобождението на България от османско иго	1878 - see Liberation of Bulgaria.
1 May	Labour Day	Ден на труда и на международната работническа солидарност	
6 May	Saint George's Day	Гергьовден, ден на храбростта и Българската армия	See Armed Forces Day.
24 May	Bulgarian Education and Culture and Slavonic Literature Day	Ден на светите братя Кирил и Методий, на българската азбука, просвета и култура и на славянската книжовност	
6 September	Unification Day	Ден на Съединението	1885 - see Bulgarian unification.
22 September	Independence Day	Ден на независимостта на България	1908 - see Bulgarian Declaration of Independence.
24 December	Christmas Eve	Бъдни вечер	
25-26 December	Christmas Day	Рождество Христово	
Moveable	Orthodox Good Friday, Holy Saturday & Easter Sunday and Monday	Велики петък, Велика събота и Великден	Good Friday, The Sunday and Monday of Easter are non-working days.

== Other observances ==
- 1 March - Baba Marta Day - Баба Марта
- 8 March - Mother's Day - Ден на майката
- 26 December - Father's Day - Ден на бащата

== Former national holidays ==
- 9 September - Day of the People's Uprising of 9 September (Ден на народното въстание на 9 септември) was celebrated in the People's Republic of Bulgaria until 1989.
- 7 November - October Revolution Day (Ден на октомврийската революция)
