= 2022 in Bulgaria =

- Decades: 2000s; 2010s; 2020s
- See also: Other events of 2022; Timeline of Bulgarian history

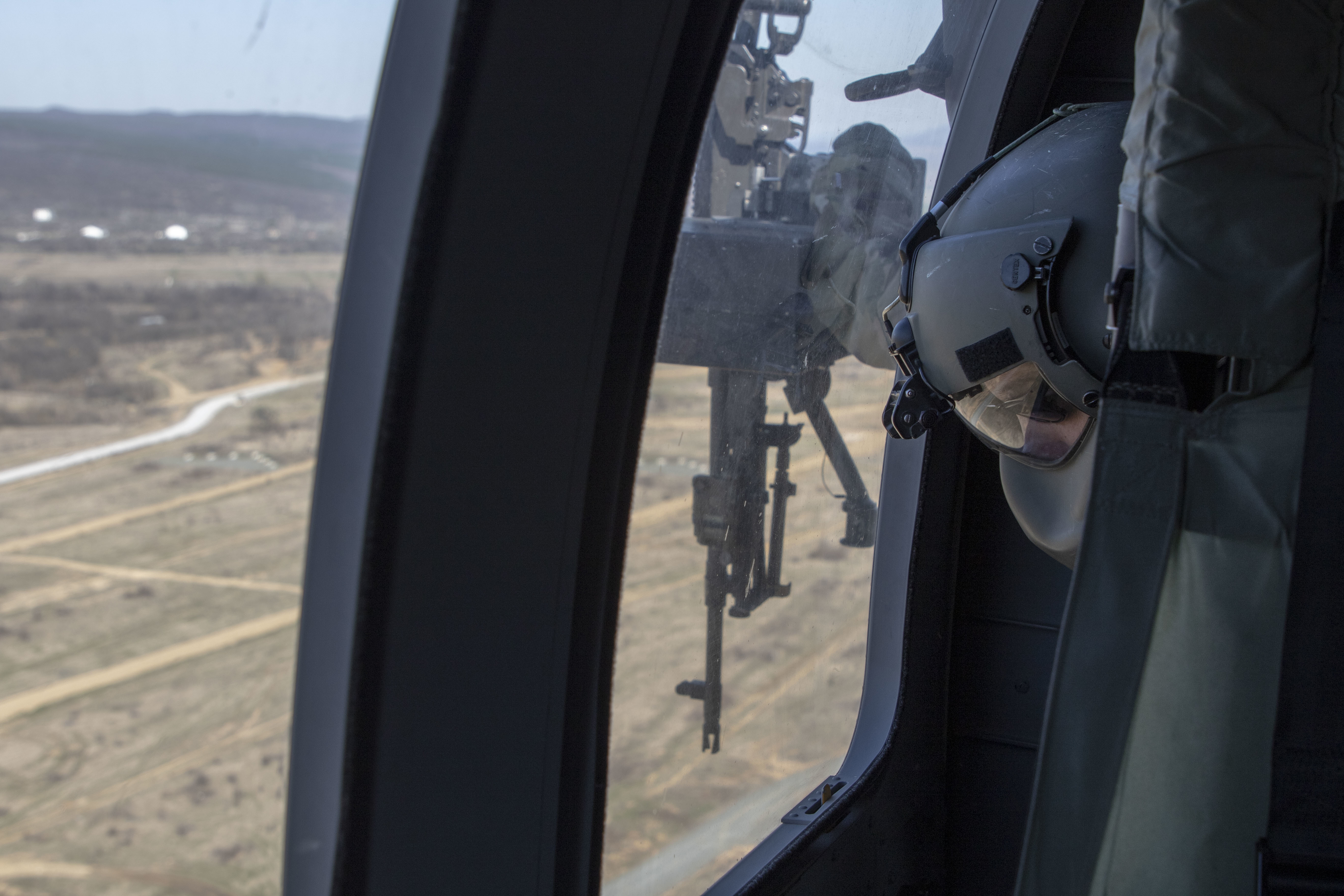
U.S. Army Soldier acts as an instructor for the gunner during UH-60 Black Hawk aerial gunnery qualifications at Novo Selo Training Area, Bulgaria, 2022. NSTA is a Bulgarian training facility operated by U.S. Army.

Events in the year 2022 in Bulgaria.

== Incumbents ==
- President: Rumen Radev
- Vice President: Iliana Iotova
- Prime Minister: Kiril Petkov (by 2 August) Galab Donev (since 2 August, acting)

== Events ==
Ongoing – COVID-19 pandemic in Bulgaria

- 2 January – The country reports its first 12 cases of the SARS-CoV-2 Omicron variant in five vaccinated people and seven unvaccinated people, most of whom had not travelled abroad.
- 7 January – The country imposes a rule that requires almost all travellers aged above 12 years from the European Union and the United Kingdom to have a negative PCR test in the previous 72 hours along with a valid COVID-19 certificate prior to arrival, in order to limit the spread of the SARS-CoV-2 Omicron variant.
- 16 February - Bulgarian MEP from the VMRO – Bulgarian National Movement Angel Dzhambazki after defending the governments of Hungary and Poland in a speech at the European Parliament, Dzhambazki insulted his fellow MEP Sandro Gozi (Renew Europe) and apparently made a Nazi salute while leaving the chamber. Dzhambazki's actions were immediately censored by the Vice-President of the European Parliament Giuseppina Picierno, who was presiding over the session.
- 17 March – The Bulgarian Interior Ministry says that former Prime Minister Boyko Borisov has been detained by police amid a probe into corruption and the alleged misuse of European Union funds. Former Finance Minister Vladislav Goranov is also arrested as part of the operation.
- 19 March – An anti-NATO protest is held in Bulgaria during a meeting between U.S. Defense Secretary Lloyd Austin and Bulgarian Prime Minister Kiril Petkov to oppose Bulgaria selling weapons to Ukraine during the invasion.
- 20 March – Bulgaria says it will end gas imports from Russia's Gazprom when its 10-year deal with Gazprom expires at the end of 2022, signaling a shift away from Russian energy. Bulgarian Energy Minister Alexander Nikolov says Bulgaria will also seek increased gas imports from Azerbaijan.
- 26 March – The government announces that the country will not extend their COVID-19 state of emergency beyond March 31.
- 26 April – Gazprom announces that it will stop delivering natural gas to Poland via the Yamal–Europe pipeline and to Bulgaria as both countries rejected Russia's demand to pay for the fossil fuel supply in Russian rubles. Poland does not expect to experience disruptions from the suspension of natural gas deliveries. However, the suspension of Russian gas deliveries to Bulgaria "poses a serious challenge to the security of supply to the country" as Bulgaria is almost completely dependent on Russian gas.
- 27 April – Gazprom announces that it has "completely suspended gas supplies" to the gas companies of Poland and Bulgaria "due to [the] absence of payments in roubles". Bulgaria, Poland, and the European Union condemn the suspension.
- 28 April – Bulgaria calls on its citizens to leave Moldova immediately by "any available means of transport" due to the "complicating situation" in the country and warns against any travel there.
- 27 May – The Bulgarian government approves adopting the euro as the country's currency on January 1, 2024, replacing the lev.
- 7 June – Three people are killed and several others are injured when a train collides with a truck in Gara Oreshets, Bulgaria.
- 9 June – A 2-seater Beechcraft plane violates the airspace of seven countries in Eastern Europe, and is intercepted by two Hungarian Air Force Gripen jets, two USAF F-16s and two Romanian Air Force F-16s before being abandoned at an airfield near Targovishte, Bulgaria.
- 22 June – The government of Bulgarian prime minister Kiril Petkov loses a motion of no confidence vote in the National Assembly.
- 24 June –
  - Bulgaria reports its first cases of monkeypox.
  - Bulgaria lifts its veto against North Macedonia's bid to join the European Union.
- 1 July – The Bulgarian Navy destroys a naval mine that had drifted close to the country's Black Sea coast in a controlled explosion. A team of divers stated that the mine was of Soviet origin.
- 16 July – The Assembly of North Macedonia passes a motion to amend North Macedonia’s Constitution to recognize its Bulgarian minority, while pledging to discuss remaining issues with the Bulgarian government. In exchange, Bulgaria will allow membership talks with the European Union to begin.
- 6 August – Four people are killed, and eight others are injured when a bus travelling from Istanbul, Turkey, to Bucharest, Romania, crashes near Veliko Tarnovo, Bulgaria.
- 2 October – 2022 Bulgarian parliamentary election: Bulgarians vote for the fourth time in 18 months to elect members of the National Assembly.

== Deaths ==
- 5 February – Anani Yavashev, 89, actor (Rio Adio, We Were Young)
- 9 February – Nora Nova, 93, singer
- 24 February – Ivanka Khristova, 80, Shot putter, Olympic champion (1976).
- 26 February – Michail Goleminov, 65, pianist, conductor and composer.
- 8 March – Desislav Chukolov, 47, politician, MEP (2007–2009)
- 27 March – Lyubomir Milchev-Dandy, 58, journalist, writer, and television personality,
- 31 March – Georgi Atanasov, 88, politician, prime minister (1986–1990).
- 22 May – Andréi Nakov, 80, French-Bulgarian art historian.
- 26 May – Enyu Todorov, 79, freestyle wrestler, Olympic silver medallist (1968).
- 2 August – Velichko Minekov, 93, sculptor
- 11 August – Yuri Mitev, 64, Olympic biathlete (1980, 1984).
- 13 August – Ekaterina Yosifova, 81, educator and poet
- 28 August – Kamen Kostadinov, 51, politician, MP (2005–2009).
- 20 October – Anton Donchev, 92, writer (Time of Parting).
- 21 October – Milen Getov, 96, Bulgarian film director.

== See also ==
- List of years in Bulgaria
