= 2016 in Bulgaria =

- Decades: 1990s; 2000s; 2010s; 2020s
- See also: Other events of 2016; Timeline of Bulgarian history

This article lists events from the year 2016 in Bulgaria

== Incumbents ==
- President: Rosen Plevneliev
- Prime Minister: Boyko Borisov

== Events ==
- 5-21 August – Bulgaria at the 2016 Summer Olympics: 51 competitors in 14 sports.
- 30 September – a legal ban on full face-covering veils was adopted by the Bulgarian parliament.
- 6 November – Bulgarian presidential election, 2016
- 6 November – a three-question referendum was held alongside presidential elections
- 10 December – the Hitrino train derailment, killing at least seven people

== Deaths ==
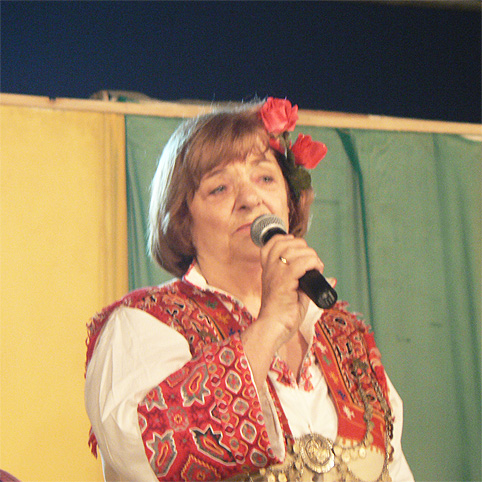
Lyubka Rondova

- 13 February – Trifon Ivanov, footballer (b. 1965).
- 24 February – Yordan Sokolov, jurist and politician (b. 1933)
- 15 March – Lyubka Rondova, folk singer (b. 1936).
- 19 March – Pavel Chernev, politician and lawyer (b. 1969)
- 4 April – Georgi Hristakiev, footballer (b. 1944)
- 1 August – Trayan Dyankov, footballer (b. 1976)
- 8 August – Nikola Anastasov, actor (b. 1932)
- 6 November – Biser Kirov, pop singer (b. 1942)
- 10 November – Nikola Korabov, film director and screenwriter (b. 1928)
- 25 November – Alexander Yossifov, composer and conductor (b. 1940)
- 26 November – Velko Valkanov, politician (b. 1927)
- 3 December – Nikola Gigov, poet (b. 1937)
- 18 December – Guinio Ganev, politician (b. 1928)

== Links ==
Media related to 2016 in Bulgaria at Wikimedia Commons
