= Parties in the European Council during 2017 =

This article describes the party affiliations of leaders of each member state represented in the European Council during the year 2017. The list below gives the political party that each head of government, or head of state, belongs to at the national level, as well as the European political alliance to which that national party belongs. The states are listed from most to least populous. More populous states have greater influence in the council, in accordance with the qualified majority system.

== Summary ==
Party	1 January 2017		27 January		4 May		14 May		13 December		18 December	
Party	#	Pop.%	#	Pop.%	#	Pop.%	#	Pop.%	#	Pop.%	#	Pop.%
European People's Party	10	35.78%	9	34.97%	10	35.78%	10	35.78%	10	35.78%	11	37.49%
Party of European Socialists	8	33.83%	8	33.83%	8	33.83%	7	20.73%	6	18.66%	5	16.95%
Alliance of Liberals and Democrats for Europe Party	6	7.46%	6	7.46%	6	7.46%	6	7.46%	7	9.53%	7	9.53%
Alliance of European Conservatives and Reformists	2	20.28%	2	20.28%	2	20.28%	2	20.28%	2	20.28%	2	20.28%
Party of the European Left	1	2.10%	1	2.10%	1	2.10%	1	2.10%	1	2.10%	1	2.10%
Independent	1	0.56%	2	1.37%	1	0.56%	2	13.66%	2	13.66%	2	13.66%

== List of leaders (1 January 2017) ==
Member state	Pop.%	Leader	Party
Germany	16.18%	Angela Merkel	CDU-EPP
France	13.10%	François Hollande	PS-PES
United Kingdom	12.86%	Theresa May	Con-AECR
Italy	11.84%	Paolo Gentiloni	PD-PES
Spain	9.09%	Mariano Rajoy	PP-EPP
Poland	7.42%	Beata Szydło	PiS-EACR
Romania	3.84%	Klaus Iohannis	Ind. (Note: Supported by PNL)-EPP
Netherlands	3.34%	Mark Rutte	VVD-ALDE
Belgium	2.22%	Charles Michel	MR-ALDE
Greece	2.10%	Alexis Tsipras	SYRIZA-PEL
Czech Republic	2.07%	Bohuslav Sobotka	ČSSD-PES
Portugal	2.01%	António Costa	PS-PES
Sweden	1.95%	Stefan Löfven	S-PES
Hungary	1.91%	Viktor Orbán	Fidesz-EPP
Austria	1.71%	Christian Kern	SPÖ-PES
Bulgaria	1.39%	Boyko Borisov	GERB-EPP
Denmark	1.12%	Lars Løkke Rasmussen	V-ALDE
Finland	1.08%	Alexander Stubb	Kok.-EPP
Slovakia	1.06%	Robert Fico	SMER-SD-PES
Ireland	0.93%	Enda Kenny	FG-EPP
Croatia	0.81%	Andrej Plenković	HDZ-EPP
Lithuania	0.56%	Dalia Grybauskaitė	Ind.
Slovenia	0.40%	Miro Cerar	SMC-ALDE
Latvia	0.38%	Māris Kučinskis	V-EPP
Estonia	0.26%	Jüri Ratas	K-ALDE
Cyprus	0.17%	Nicos Anastasiades	DISY-EPP
Luxembourg	0.12%	Xavier Bettel	DP-ALDE
Malta	0.09%	Joseph Muscat	PL-EPP

== Changes ==
Date	State	Former		Newer	
Date	State	Leader	Party	Leader	Party
27 January	Bulgaria	Boyko Borisov	GERB-EPP	Ognyan Gerdzhikov	Ind.
4 May	Bulgaria	Ognyan Gerdzhikov	Ind.	Boyko Borisov	GERB-EPP
14 May	France	François Hollande	PS-PES	Emmanuel Macron	LREM-NI
14 June	Ireland	Enda Kenny	FG-EPP	Leo Varadkar	FG-EPP
11 December	Poland	Beata Szydło	PiS-EACR	Mateusz Morawiecki	PiS-EACR
13 December	Czech Republic	Bohuslav Sobotka	ČSSD-PES	Andrej Babiš	ANO-ALDE
18 December	Austria	Christian Kern	SPÖ-PES	Sebastian Kurz	ÖVP-EPP

== See also ==
- Presidency of the Council of the European Union
