= 2017 in Bulgaria =

- Decades: 1990s; 2000s; 2010s; 2020s
- See also: Other events of 2017; Timeline of Bulgarian history

Events in the year 2017 in Bulgaria.

== Incumbents ==
- President: Rosen Plevneliev (until 22 January); Rumen Radev
- Prime Minister: Boyko Borisov (until 27 January); Ognyan Gerdzhikov (until 4 May); Boyko Borisov

== Events ==
- 22 January – Rumen Radev takes over as President
- 27 January – Ognyan Gerdzhikov takes over as Prime Minister
- 26 March – The 2017 Bulgarian parliamentary election are held, making Bokyo Borisov the Prime Minister. GERB wins the most seats, and the far-right United Patriots alliance enters parliament for the first time.
- 13 May – Bulgaria gets 2nd place in The 2017 Eurovision.
- 10 June – The annual Sofia Pride march takes place, with heightened security concerns due to announced counter-demonstration by a nationalist group.
- October – Television journalist Viktor Nikolaev is publicly threatened by senior government figures during an on-air exchange related to investigative reporting.
- December – Parliament approves new anticorruption legislation that establishes a centralized agency; President Radev then announces his intention to veto the bill.

== Deaths ==
Atanas Kirov

- 25 January – Ivan Pritargov, footballer (b. 1952).
- 27 January – Atanas Kirov, weightlifter, three times world champion (b. 1946).
- 29 January – Boris Nikolov, boxer and Olympic bronze medalist (b. 1929).
- 15 June – Rumen Nenov, footballer (b. 1969).
- 20 August - Velichko Cholakov, weightlifter (b.12 January 1982)
