= Valentin Plamenov =

Valentin Plamenov (Bulgarian: Валентин Пламенов) (6 February 1951 – 4 September 2003, Sofia, Bulgaria) was a Bulgarian writer, essayist, satirist, dramatist, screenwriter, and journalist.

== Biography ==
Plamenov attended the French Gymnasium in Sofia, achieving the highest academic distinction for which he was awarded the gold medal. Plamenov graduated from Sofia University St. Kliment Ohridski in Bulgarian and French Philology.

Plamenov worked for the Bulgarian satirical newspaper Starshel (Hornet) as well as the Bulgarian Cultural Center in Delhi, India until 1992. Plamenov renewed the satirical newspaper Bulgaran under the title New Bulgaran and became its editor-in-chief. He published in the newspapers People's Youth, Pardon, Novinar and the magazine Caricature.

Plamenov actively contributed to shows broadcast by the Bulgarian National Television and Radio, as well as Bulgarian cinema. His literary work varies from theater plays, crime novels to children's plays, and over 400 scripts TV shows, and 200 scripts for radio shows.

Plamenov died of lung cancer on September 4, 2003.
