= 2011 Bulgaria anti-Romani protests =

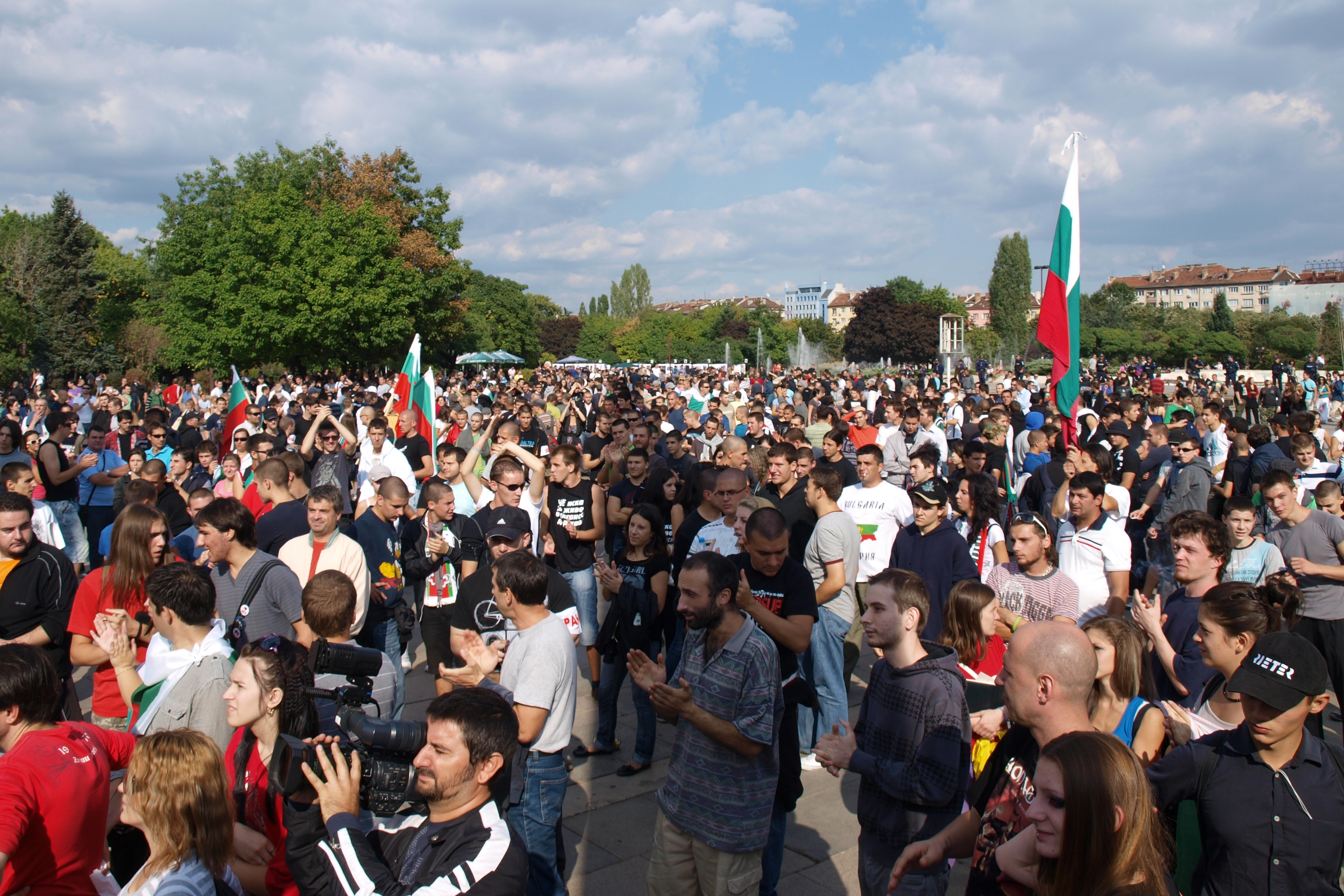
- Protesters outside of the National Palace of Culture
- Date: 23 September 2011 – 2 October 2011
- Location: Bulgaria
- Caused by: Murder of Angel Petrov; Government corruption Anti-Romani sentiment
- Result: Protests suppressed: Multiple cars and houses burned

Parties
Protesters: Ataka	Bulgaria: National Police Service

Lead figures
Volen Siderov	(Bulgaria) Georgy Parvanov (Bulgaria) Boyko Borisov

Number
Over 10,000	Unknown

Casualties and losses
Several wounded 127 arrested	Several wounded

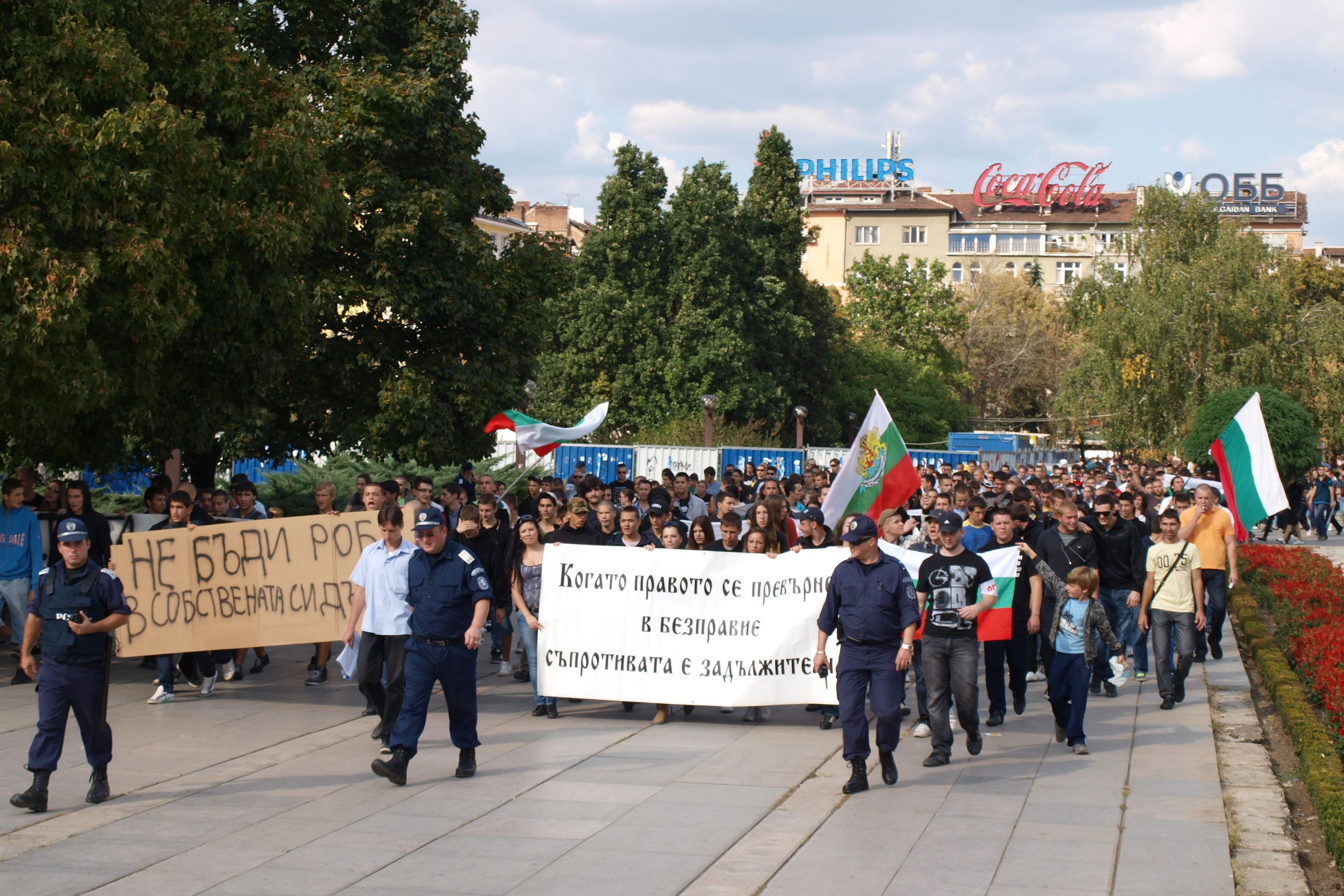
Protest in Sofia at 1 Oct 2011 Left: Do not be a slave in your own country. Right: When law becomes lawlessness, resistance is obligatory.

The 2011 Bulgaria anti-Romani protests started during the night of 23 to 24 September 2011 in the village Katunitsa and later spread to other locations all over the country, including Plovdiv, Sofia, Varna, Burgas, Pleven, Ruse, Pazardzhik, Stara Zagora and others. The reason for the unrest was the murder of a local youth, who was run over by a car by the close associate of local Roma boss Kiril Rashkov. These protests were accompanied with racist chants and calls for violence against Romani. The riots in Katunitsa led to the burning of two cars and four houses, owned by different members of the family of the alleged Romani crime boss Kiril Rashkov, also known as "Tsar Kiro". The United Nations and the OSCE condemned the demonstrations and the violence.

== Background ==
The protests started in response to the vehicular homicide of 19-year-old Angel Petrov in Katunitsa. The murder was committed by 55-year-old Simeon Yosifov, who is believed to be a close associate of crime boss Kiril Rashkov. The death of Angel Petrov was preceded by death threats involving a "car accident", which were published in the Bulgarian video-sharing website "vbox7".

== October protests ==
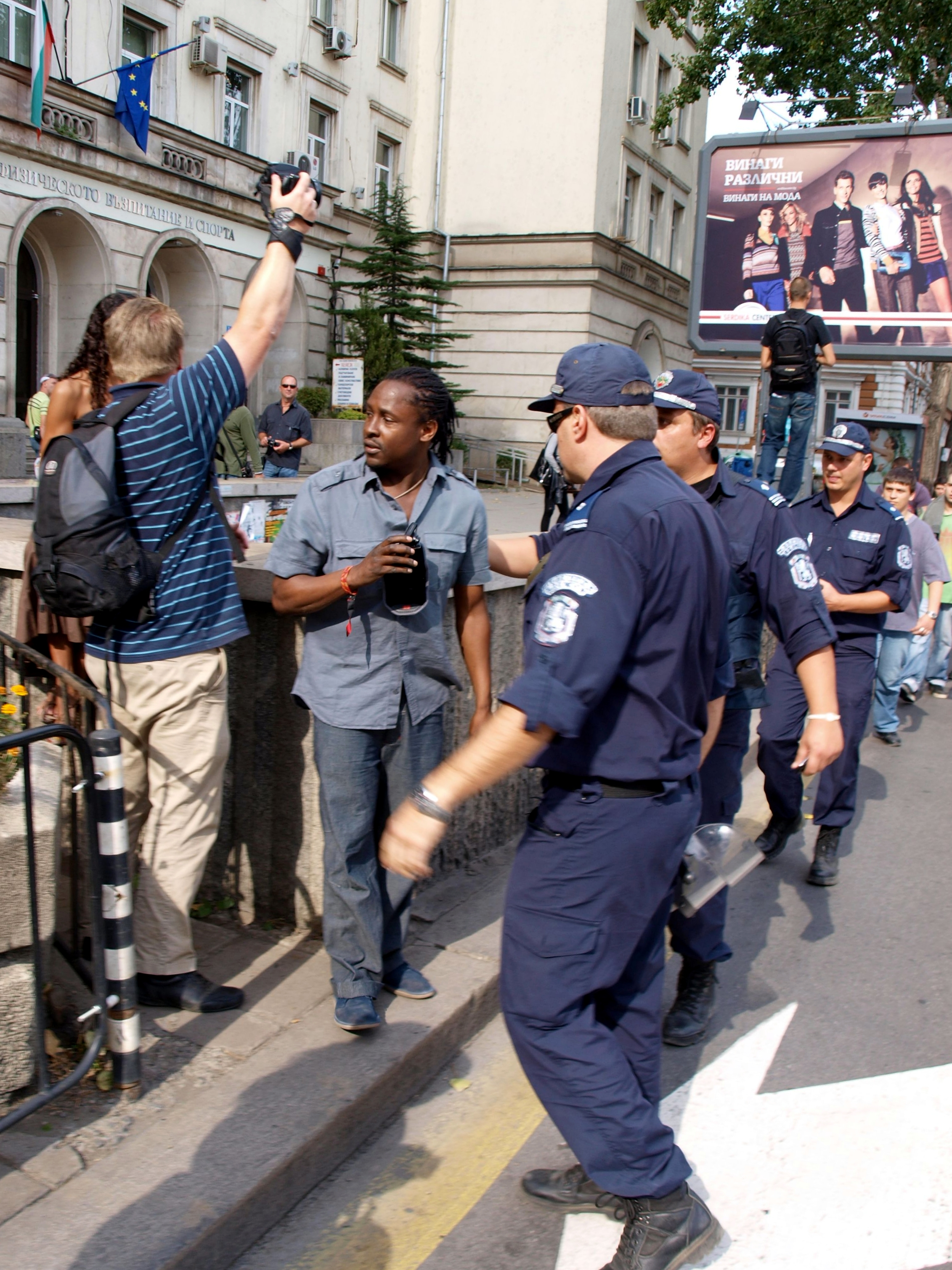
Sofia anti-Romani protest, 1 Oct 2011 Bulgarian policemen lead a dark-skinned hobby photographer away from the route of the demonstration, to prevent possible beating. White photographers shoot undisturbed.

Protests continued on 1 October in Sofia, with 2000 Bulgarians marching against the Romani and what they viewed to be the "impunity and the corruption" of the political elite in the country.

Volen Siderov, leader of the far-right Ataka party and presidential candidate, spoke to a crowd at the Presidential Palace in Sofia, calling for the death penalty to be reinstated, as well as Romani ghettos to be dismantled. Many of these organized protests were accompanied by ethnic clashes and racist violence against Romani. The protesters shouted racist slogans like "Gypsies into soap" and "Turks under the knife." Many protesters were arrested for public order offenses. The news media labelled the protests as anti-Romani Pogroms.

== Political reaction ==
According to the BBC, President Georgy Parvanov called on the protesters for "an end to the language of hatred". Parvanov and Prime Minister Boyko Borisov called a meeting of the national security council to address the issue.

These protests came before the presidential elections on 23 October. Far-right Ataka party leader Volen Siderov tried to capitalise on the tensions and called for the death penalty to be reinstated and for Romani "ghettos" to be dismantled. The United Nations and the OSCE condemned the demonstrations and the violence.

== International reaction ==
Reuters attributed the protests and civil disturbances to the lack of an effective justice system in the country. Russian media emphasized the ethnic nature of the societal polarizations, expressing the belief that the Roma are indirectly benefiting from positive discrimination on the part of law enforcement agents.

== Trial ==
In January 2012, Kiril Rashkov was convicted of making death threats against two villagers from Katunitsa. He was sentenced to 3 1/2 years in jail.
