= Krastyo Ralenkov =

Bulgarian poet (1965–2025)

Krastyo Ralenkov (Bulgarian: Кръстьо Раленков; 16 July 1965 – 6 August 2025) was a Bulgarian poet.

== Biography ==
Ralenkov was born in Panagyurishte on 16 July 1965. He graduated from high school in Sofia, and then studied philosophy at Sofia University. His debut publications appeared in the student magazines Rodna rech and Srednoshkolsko zname. He published poems, stories and feuilletons in numerous newspapers, including Starshel, Standard, and Fakel.

In 1990 he was among the founders of the magazine Hermes, together with Mladen Misana, Vyacheslav Oster and Emilia Dvoryanova. The journal developed in the form of an annual almanac and aimed to publish "undeservedly rejected or not offered manuscripts". In the period 1997–1998 he was a screenwriter of Canaletto.

In 2012 he won the Slaveykov Prize for Lyrical Poem. The following year, his debut collection of poems The Day of the One-Day was published, with the support of the Municipality of Panagyurishte. In 2018, his second poetry book Oxygen was published.

In 2022, he was awarded the Ivan Nikolov Prize for his book Death Questions Who You Are.

Ralenkov died of cancer in Plovdiv on 6 August 2025, at the age of 60.
