= 2023 in Bulgaria =

- Decades: 2000s; 2010s; 2020s
- See also: Other events of 2023; Timeline of Bulgarian history

Events in the year 2023 in Bulgaria.

== Incumbents ==
- President: Rumen Radev
- Prime Minister:
  - Galab Donev (up to 6 June 2023)
  - Nikolay Denkov (from 6 June 2023)

== Events ==
=== February ===
- 26 February – One person is killed and 29 others are injured after a bus carrying migrants crashes near Chirpan, Stara Zagora Province.

=== April ===
- 2 April – 2023 Bulgarian parliamentary election: Bulgarians elect the 240 members of the parliament. Exit polls show former Prime Minister Boyko Borisov's party GERB narrowly defeating former Prime Minister Kiril Petkov's alliance PP–DB.

=== September ===
- 6 September – At least 10 people have been killed by floods caused by torrential rain in Bulgaria, Turkey, and Greece.

=== October ===
- 27 October – The Financial Action Task Force adds Bulgaria to its "grey list" for increased monitoring due to strategic deficiencies in countering money laundering and terrorism financing.

=== December ===
- 28 December – Bulgaria and Romania reach an agreement to become members of the Schengen Area through sea and air routes in March 2024, while discussions regarding the opening of land borders are scheduled to commence next year.

== Sports ==
- 6 July 2022 – June 2023: 2022–23 First Professional Football League (Bulgaria)
- 14 July 2022 – 3 June 2023: 2022–23 Second Professional Football League (Bulgaria)
- 2022–23 Third Amateur Football League (Bulgaria)
- 2022–23 Bulgarian Cup

== See also ==
- List of years in Bulgaria
