= 2018 in Bulgaria =

- Decades: 1990s; 2000s; 2010s; 2020s
- See also: Other events of 2018; Timeline of Bulgarian history

Events in the year 2018 in Bulgaria.

== Incumbents ==
- President: Rumen Radev
- Prime Minister: Boyko Borisov

== Events ==
- 1st January - Bulgaria adopts the euro as its official currency.
- January - Large protests over environmental and development issues, thousands of people protested in Sofia opposing plans to expand a ski resort in Pirin National Park.
- March - Bulgarian National Union – New Democracy had a nationalist rally with More than 1,000 far-right supporters, Shouting slogans such as "Freedom or death!" and "All communists to court! Bulgaria is taking a new nationalist path!. Members of nationalist groups from a number of other European countries such as the Sweden's Nordic Resistance Movement also took part.
- March - The Bulgarian government withdrew Istanbul convention Ratification plan on preventing violence against women.
- 17 May - Sofia hosts the EU-Western Balkans Summit, bringing together European leaders and the leaders of the six Western Balkan countries — Albania, Bosnia, Serbia, Macedonia and Kosovo —, agreeing to closer ties.
- August - A bus crash caused the death of 16 people and injured many others.

== Deaths ==
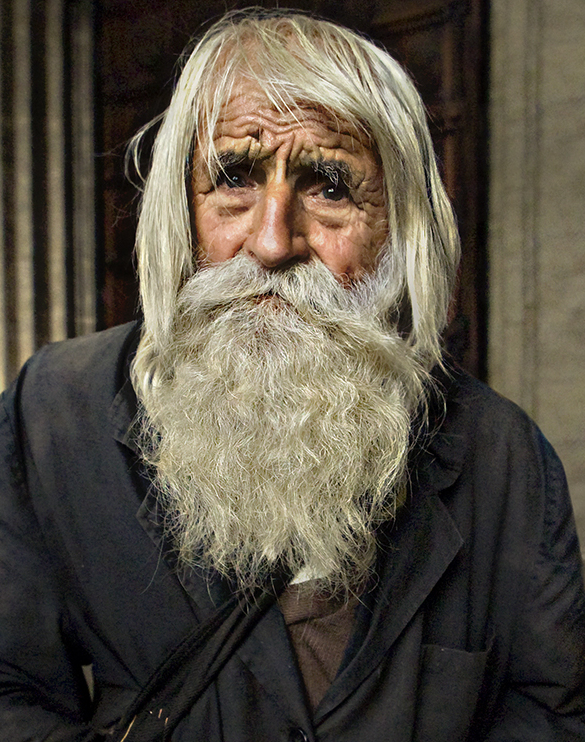
Dobri Dobrev

- 15 January – Mariana Alamancheva, actress (b. 1941).
- 13 February – Dobri Dobrev, ascetic and philanthropist (b. 1914).
- 25 February – Tsvetan Veselinov, footballer (b. 1947).
- 10 June – Rumen Petkov, animator, painter and comic creator (b. 1948).
