= 2019 in Bulgaria =

- Decades: 1990s; 2000s; 2010s; 2020s
- See also: Other events of 2019; Timeline of Bulgarian history

Events in the year 2019 in Bulgaria.

== Incumbents ==
- President: Rumen Radev
- Prime Minister: Boyko Borisov

== Events ==
- 6 January – Thousands of Orthodox Christians dived into icy rivers and lakes throughout the country to retrieve crucifixes placed by priests in the water to celebrate Epiphany.
- 16 February – More than 2,000 far-right activists from several European countries staged a torchlit procession through Sofia honoring the Nationalist general and politician Hristo Lukov.
- 5 – 11 February – The 2019 Sofia Open tennis tournament took place at the Arena Armeec in Sofia.
- 8 – 10 March – The 2019 World Short Track Speed Skating Championships were held in Sofia.

== Deaths ==
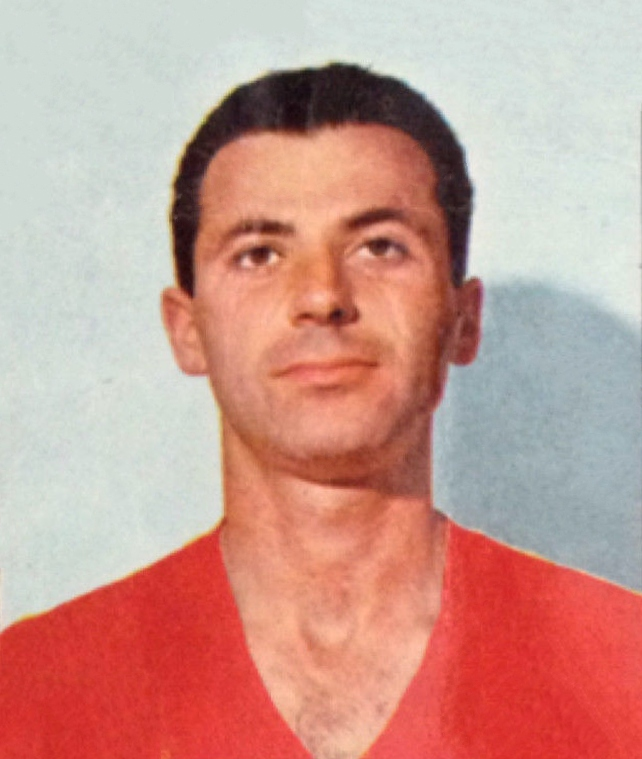
Ivan Dimitrov

- 1 January – Ivan Dimitrov, footballer (b. 1935).
- 18 January – Ivan Vutsov, footballer (b. 1939).
- 22 January – Kiril Petkov, Olympic wrestler (b. 1933).
- 22 April – Krasimir Bezinski, footballer (b. 1961).
