= Corruption in Bulgaria =

Corruption in Bulgaria has decreased in recent years, after a series of reforms implemented through EU guidance. Among recent improvements, amendments to the constitution in 2015 brought about a reform of the Supreme Judicial Council and a stronger judicial inspectorate. Furthermore, the broader legislative framework has seen a number of reforms over the years, in particular through the amendments of the Judicial System Act in 2016 and of the Criminal Procedure Code in 2017.

== Corruption Perceptions Index ==
The Corruption Perceptions Index (CPI) is released by Transparency International at the beginning of each year. The report is based on the polling of experts from around the world on topics such as a free press, integrity, and independent judiciaries. In the CPI, lower-scoring countries experience "untrustworthy and badly functioning public institutions like the police and judiciary."

In the 2025 Corruption Perceptions Index, Bulgaria scored 40 on a scale from 0 ("highly corrupt") to 100 ("very clean"). When ranked by score, Bulgaria ranked 84th among the 182 countries in the Index, where the country ranked first is perceived to have the most honest public sector. For comparison with regional scores, the best score among Western European and European Union countries (Note: Austria, Belgium, Bulgaria, Croatia, Cyprus, Czechia, Denmark, Estonia, Finland, France, Germany, Greece, Hungary, Iceland, Ireland, Italy, Latvia, Lithuania, Luxembourg, Malta, Netherlands, Norway, Poland, Portugal, Romania, Slovakia, Slovenia, Spain, Sweden, Switzerland, and the United Kingdom.) was 89, the average score was 64 and the worst score was 40. For comparison with worldwide scores, the best score was 89 (ranked 1), the average score was 42, and the worst score was 9 (ranked 181, in a two-way tie).

== Types of corruption ==
=== Lobbying ===
A 2014 study by Transparency International indicated that lobbying in Bulgaria is mainly unregulated and happens behind closed doors. "The report Lobbying in Bulgaria: Interests, Influence, Politics shows that there are significant deficits in the transparency, integrity, and equality of access regarding influence over public decision-making in the country." The study used a framework from a project called "lifting the lid on lobbying," and Bulgaria received a "paltry overall score of only 25%." For transparency, Bulgaria received a score of 13%; for integrity, 25%; and 38% for free quality of access. By 2014, four legislative proposals had been introduced in Bulgaria's parliament, but none of the bills had been passed.

=== Vote-buying ===
During the 2014 parliamentary election, Bulgaria's Transparency International telephone helpline received 202 complaints. One of the top three complaints concerned vote-buying. A pub owner in a small village offered Roma voters US$40–$55 to vote a certain way, with the money paid only if the political party in question won. Some 480,000 illegally printed ballots were discovered at a printing house in Kostinbrod the day before the May 2013 parliamentary election. The blank ballots might have been prepared to manipulate the vote. The owner of the printing house, a municipal councilor from GERB, claimed that the ballots were technical spoilage.

=== Judiciary ===
In 2017, the Council of Europe expressed concern about the lack of judicial independence and the compromised separation of powers in the country. The Venice Commission has raised concern about the Soviet model of Bulgaria's Prosecution, which turns it into "a source of corruption and blackmail." Civil activists have demanded the resignation of Bulgaria's General Prosecutor Sotir Tsatsarov for some time now, due to his alleged involvement in high-profile corruption cases.

=== Public tenders ===
Government procurement is an area of significant corruption risk. Many of the public contracts are awarded to a few politically connected companies amid widespread irregularities, procedure violations, and tailor-made award criteria. Ognyan Gerdzhikov's interim government found widespread violations in defense procurement after it took over from the Second Borisov Government in 2017; 45 out of 82 defense ministry contracts signed the previous year were in breach of public procurement laws and regulations. Fraud was strongly suspected in nine of the procedures.

An estimated 10 billion leva ($5.99 billion) of state budget and European cohesion funds are spent on public tenders each year; nearly 14 billion ($8.38 billion) were spent on public contracts in 2017 alone.

=== Police corruption ===
Data from the 2011 Eurobarometer research places Bulgaria fourth in the European Union (EU) in terms of bribes paid to public officials. The main factor behind this ranking is bribes paid to police officers. According to the same research, Bulgaria sits first on the list of EU member states with widespread police corruption.

While many of the duties of safeguarding - largely through oppression - the communist rule in Bulgaria was undertaken by the Ministry of the Interior (MoI), after 1989 its make-up changed dramatically. From 1990 to 1993, almost one quarter of the MoI's staff were dismissed - between 12,000 and 19,000 police officers, 60-90% of which were officers at the medium and senior levels. Additionally, a role in the political conflicts of the 1990s led to further dismissals of national and regional police detectives and mass layoffs of middle-ranking officers. Simultaneously, Bulgaria was undergoing a transition from the Soviet Communist regime to democracy, leading to a sharp increase in crime and criminal incidents (up to ten times in growth for some crimes), coupled with a severe economic downturn and the emergence of a large number of criminal groups. The effects of these drastic changes to the MoI and dramatic upheaval of Bulgaria's political landscape culminated in the financial and economic crisis of 1996–97, during which police corruption rose on almost all levels.

Before these changes from 1944 to 1989, abuses within the MoI were investigated by the State Security, an almost replica of the Soviet KGB, which had total control of law enforcement. This was achieved by monitoring the political loyalty of MoI staff, but also by exceptional powers to investigate abuses, including the use of undercover agents and virtually unlimited powers to investigate. However, the considerable experience accumulated over these years was lost immediately after the democratic change in 1989, when the body was disbanded.

After Bulgaria joined the EU in 2007, the country was seriously challenged to eliminate instances of police corruption. As a result of this, the deputy chief of a police service was dismissed over accusations of illicit contact with an alcohol producer, and police misconduct has been limited by institutional and legal changes.

However, Bulgaria continues to experience everyday police corruption, and the Bulgarian people continue to hold negative views of the nation's police force. Corruption and conflicts of interest continue to offer a serious challenge to public perceptions of the Bulgarian police, attitudes that are not only encouraged by political scandals and frequent media coverage of police corruption, but also by the personal experiences of everyday Bulgarians. In 2013, 65% of respondents to Transparency International's Global Corruption Barometer thought that the police were either corrupt or extremely corrupt. However, comparing this to 86% who felt the same about the judiciary and 71% for the parliament/legislator, shows that Bulgarians are regaining trust in their police force, or at the very least, have more trust in them than other public officials who have some effect on their legal protection.

== Effects ==
=== Economic mismanagement ===
Corruption has resulted in significant economic losses and underperformance in Bulgaria. Since it accessed to the EU in 2007, it has remained the Union's poorest country, with a per-capita GDP of $16,300—less than half the European average. By 2014, the Bulgarian government was accused of mismanaging the economy so badly that the European Union froze billions of euros in aid. Between 2008 and 2018, foreign direct investment collapsed, dropping from 28% to 2% of GDP, or $9 billion to just $1.13 billion. The cabinets of Boyko Borisov have been in power throughout most of the decade, establishing a system of impunity for high-profile crime, and favoritism of certain local companies. Approximately 22% of GDP is lost to corruption each year, and a number of major foreign companies, like ČEZ Group, have withdrawn from Bulgaria.

=== Social unrest ===
Corruption is a source of profound public discontent. Corruption and government inaction against convicted Roma criminal Kiril Rashkov sparked the 2011 anti-Roma riots. The 2013 Bulgarian protests against the first Borisov cabinet spread to over 30 cities, and were marked by seven self-immolations, five of which were fatal. The protests, directed against corruption, poverty, and political parties, led to the resignation of the First Borisov Government. Mass demonstrations continued against the government of Plamen Oresharski, which also resigned following the appointment of Delyan Peevski as head of the State Agency for National Security. Another wave of demonstrations occurred in November 2018 against low wages, as well as fuel price and vehicle tax hikes. Some 20 cities saw protests demanding the resignation of the Third Borisov Government; several major roads were blocked. Grand corruption disclosures in June 2020 led to the 2020-2021 Bulgarian mass anti-government protests. This was the cause of GERB losing the April and July 2021 parliamentary elections after ruling the country for 12 years.

=== Deterioration of media freedom ===
According to Reporters Without Borders, the press industry in Bulgaria is rife with "corruption and collusion between media, politicians, and oligarchs." Media ownership is opaque, not transparent, and concentrated in the hands of a few owners—despite a superficial diversity in ownership. Upon joining the European Union in 2007, Bulgaria ranked 35th on the Press Freedom Index, alongside France. It has since tumbled to 111th, by far the worst press freedom performer of any EU member and candidate state. More than 90% of Bulgarian journalists, as polled by the Association of European Journalists, have reported frequent interference with their work. Lawmakers have gone as far as threatening TV journalists with sacking during a live broadcast. The media environment has been further degraded by EU funds diverted by the government to sympathetic media outlets. In 2018, two journalists were detained and later released by police while they investigated a massive scheme to drain EU funds by a company associated with a number of high-profile government procurement projects.

== Progress in anti-corruption measures ==
In Bulgaria, the period since the report of November 2018 to around 2021 was characterised by relative political stability, though a particular controversy emerged around allegations concerning the acquisition of properties at below-market prices by high-level officials and politicians.

In the November 2018 CVM report, benchmarks one (judicial independence), two (legal framework) and six (organized crime) have been provisionally closed, noting that Bulgaria has made significant progress in these areas. Judicial appointments and the functioning of the judicial inspectorate were identified as areas for ongoing monitoring, and certain aspects of the legal environment also remained open for further consideration in the context of other benchmarks.

The Commission's latest CVM report, adopted in October 2019, recorded that Bulgaria had made a number of further commitments and concluded that the progress made under the CVM was sufficient to meet Bulgaria's commitments made at the time of its accession to the EU.
