= 2021 in Bulgaria =

- Decades: 2000s; 2010s; 2020s
- See also: Other events of 2021; Timeline of Bulgarian history

Events in the year 2021 in Bulgaria.

== Incumbents ==
- President: Rumen Radev
- Prime Minister: Boyko Borisov (until 12 May), Stefan Yanev (from 12 May until 13 December), Kiril Petkov (from 13 December)

== Events ==
Ongoing – COVID-19 pandemic in Bulgaria

=== March ===
- 22 March – Two Russian diplomats were declared persona non grata and expelled after being implicated in a GRU spy ring.

=== July ===
- 30 July – Caretaker Health Minister Stoicho Katsarov announced that the government would impose stricter restrictions until August 31 following a surge in COVID-19 cases.

=== September ===
- 7 September – The government imposed new COVID-19 restrictions after a rapid surge in COVID-19 infections.
- 8 September – Thousands of people went to the streets in Sofia to protest the government's decision of imposing stricter COVID-19 restrictions.

=== November ===
- 14 November – General elections were held in the country to elect both the President and the National Assembly.
- 23 November – A Macedonian bus carrying 52 people crashed and caught fire on the Struma motorway near the village of Bosnek, south-west of Sofia, killing 45 people, including twelve children. It was the deadliest road accident in Bulgarian history and was referred to as the deadliest bus crash in Europe in a decade.

== Deaths ==
- 6 January – Filip Trifonov, actor (b. 1947).
- 26 January – Georgi Ananiev, politician and former Minister of Defence (b. 1950).
- 6 May – Vanya Kostova, singer (b. 1957).
- 8 May – Georgi Dimitrov, footballer (b. 1959).
- 27 May – Lorina Kamburova, actress (b. 1991).
- Tinka Dineva
- Gergana Kofardzhieva
- Klara Marinova
- Denis Teofikov
- Georgi Penkov
- Petio Petkov
- Angel

== See also ==
- List of years in Bulgaria
- 2021 in Bulgaria
- 2021 in Bulgarian sport
- 2021 in the European Union
