= VBox7 =

Bulgarian video platform

VBOX7
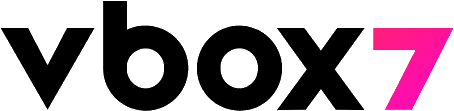
- Website type: Video sharing
- Available in: Bulgarian language
- Country of origin: Bulgaria
- Owner: Netinfo
- Website: www.vbox7.com
- Commercial: Yes
- Launched: 30 June 2006; 20 years ago
- Current status: Active

VBox7 (pronounced "vi box sedem" in Bulgarian and "vi box seven" in English, stylized variously as VBOX7 or vbox7) is a Bulgarian video platform. As of April 2017, it was the 22nd most popular website in Bulgaria. The website has been owned by the Netinfo company since October 2007.

== History ==
The site was launched on 30 July 2006 and in the beginning it regularly had only a few visitors. The site's slogan was The Bulgarian video sharing website. In March 2008, VBox7 was regularly visited by around 200,000 people while there were more than 9,000 registered users. On 6 February 2012 the mobile version of the site was launched. Two years later, a mobile app for Android and iOS was created.

In early June 2014, the site launched a partnership program because user-generated content was not seen as profitable anymore. VBox7 started to transition to self-produced content and partners network. In 2015, famous Bulgarian vloggers (Emil Conrad and Boryana Stefanova, for example) migrated to YouTube. Videos of users, who didn't have a contract with VBox7, were made inaccessible from outside Bulgaria. A lot of previously uploaded videos were deleted. VBox7 changed its design to a more mobile-friendly one, merging the mobile and desktop versions. The transition was considered complete by the end of 2016.

== Features ==
=== Video technology ===
Previously, watching videos on VBox7 required the Adobe Flash Player plug-in to be installed because the site made use of the flv video format.

Now, VBox7 uses an HTML5 video player and H.264/MPEG-4 AVC is its default video compression format. The site also supports HD videos up to 2160p.

=== Mobile app ===
VBox7 published its mobile app in March 2014. As of April 2016 it had around 1 million downloads in Google Play and iTunes.

== See also ==
- YouTube
- List of online video platforms
