= Monument to Vasil Levski, Targovishte =

Sculpture in Targovishte, Bulgaria

- Паметник на Васил Левски в Търговище
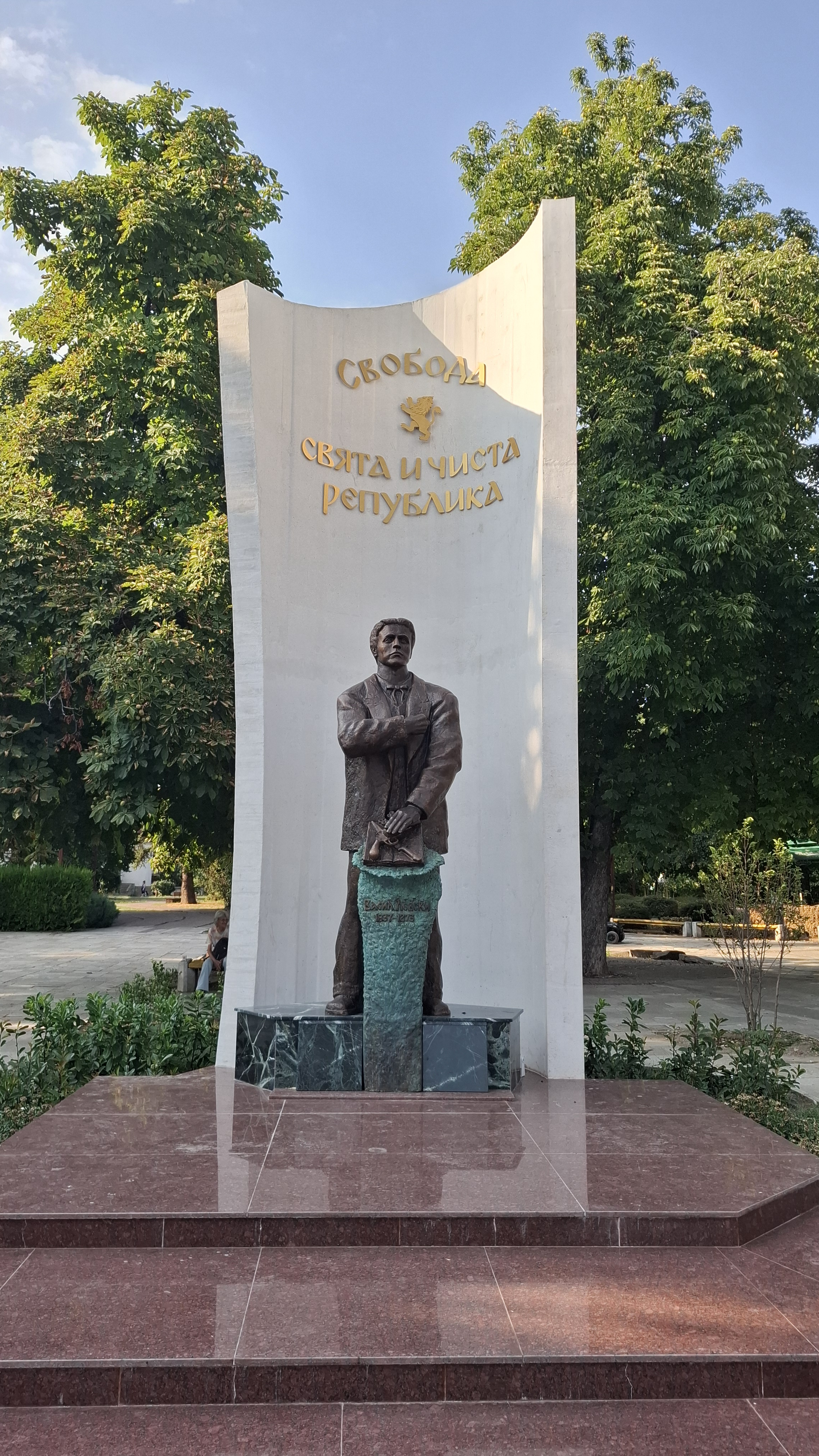
- The monument photographed in August 2026
- Interactive map of Monument to Vasil Levski, Targovishte
- Location: Nezavisimost Square, Targovishte
- Coordinates: 43°14′57.9″N 26°34′22.2″E
- Designer: Iliya Ivanov
- Type: sculpture
- Material: bronze
- Height: 2.6 metres (8 ft 6 in)
- Weight: >700 kilograms (1,500 lb)
- Opening date: 17 July 2026
- Dedicated to: Vasil Levski

The Monument to Vasil Levski in Targovishte is a sculpture of Bulgarian national hero Vasil Levski in Targovishte, Bulgaria.

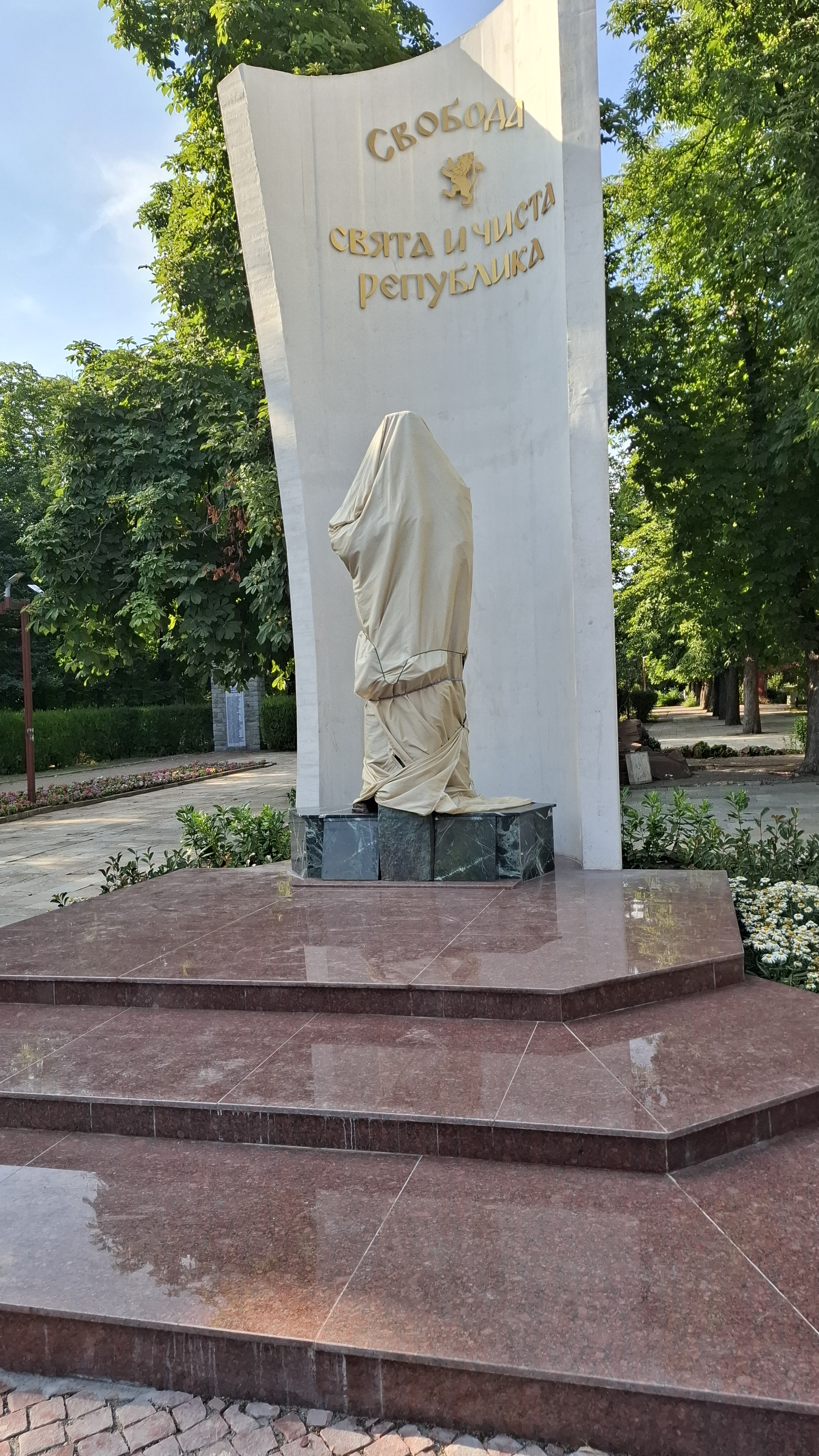
The monument two days before its official opening

The statue's official opening was held on 17 July 2026, during a ceremony marking the 189th anniversary of Vasil Levski's birth. It was unveiled on Nezavisimost Square by Bulgaria's President Iliana Iotova and Targovishte's mayor Darin Dimitrov. Its height is 2.6 metres (8 ft 6 in), and it weighs more than 700 kilograms (1,500 lb).

== See also ==
- Monument to Vasil Levski, Sofia
