= Verka Siderova =

Bulgarian musician (1926–2025)

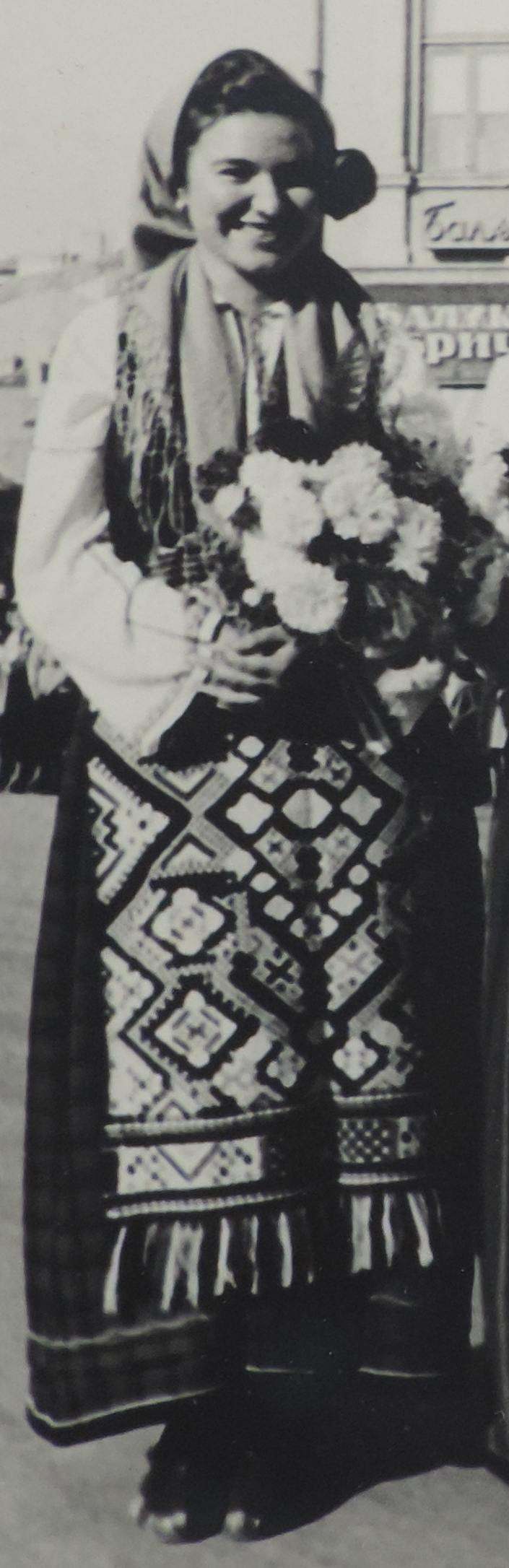
Verka Siderova in 1940

Verka Siderova Ivanova (Bulgarian: Верка Сидерова Иванова; 26 April 1926 – 2 July 2025) was a Bulgarian folk singer, known for singing songs from the Dobrudzha region.

== Life and career ==
Ivanova was born in Dobrich on 26 April 1926. In 1952, in Sofia she won her first prize for participating in the National Review of Amateur Artistic Activities in the Army. Then she auditioned personally with Filip Kutev and thereafter was part of the collective of the Ensemble for Folk Songs and Dances.

Many of her performances are preserved in the collection of the National Radio and Television. She notably released an album featuring recordings of Dobrudzha folk songs from the period from 1960 to 2000.

In 2004, she was named an honorary citizen of Dobrich.

On the occasion of her 85th birthday, she published her autobiography "Are You Tulip, Are You Hyacinth – My Biography" and was awarded the Order of Stara Planina.

Siderova died on 2 July 2025, at the age of 99.
