= Elza Goeva =

Bulgarian painter (1928–2026)

Elza Borisova Goeva (Bulgarian: Елза Борисова Гоева; 27 July 1928 – 16 March 2026) was a Bulgarian painter.

== Life and career ==
Borisova Goeva was born in Bolyarovo on 27 July 1928. She was known for painting portraits and landscapes. Her works are displayed in the National Gallery of Art.

Borisova Goeva died on 16 March 2026, at the age of 97. Her husband was the artist Vladimir Goev.

== Awards ==
In October 2006, Goeva received the "Icarus" award from the gallery of the same name for her solo painting exhibition "The Temple".
