= Kiril Rashkov =

Bulgarian Romani politician and crime boss (1942–2021)

- Кирил Рашков
- Born: 24 May 1942; Miravci, Yugoslavia (now North Macedonia)
- Died: 1 April 2021 (aged 78); Plovdiv, Bulgaria
- Criminal charges: Death threats (2011)
- Penalty: 30 years (1989); 3.5 years (2011)

Kiril Rashkov (Bulgarian: Кирил Рашков; 24 May 1942 – 1 April 2021), also known as Tsar Kiro (Bulgarian: Цар Киро), was a Bulgarian Romani politician and crime boss. Rashkov was a community leader among Romani people in Plovdiv, claiming the title of King of the Gypsies. He was imprisoned repeatedly for crimes including tax evasion, creating moonshine and death threats. Rashkov was a prominent figure in the 2011 Bulgaria anti-Romani protests after individuals associated with Rashkov's crime family killed a man with a car.

== Biography ==
Rashkov was born in Miravci, Yugoslavia on 24 May 1942 to a Kalderash family. At the time, the city was under Bulgarian rule as part of the Axis occupation of Serbia during World War II. Rashkov later falsely claimed that he had been born in Stolipinovo, Plovdiv, as the eighth son of "Gogo", a mythical King of the Gypsies in the district. Documents on Rashkov's birth were submitted to a court as part of a 2011 tax evasion trial revealing his birth in Miravci. Rashkov later claimed the title of King of the Gypsies for himself, using the name Tsar Kiro.

Rashkov was first arrested in 1984 on charges of illegally possessing gold and over two million leva. After being convicted, he was sent to Belene labour camp. In 1989, he was convicted to seven different crimes with a combined sentence of 30 years' imprisonment. However, as part of the fall of communism, he was released as part of an amnesty on 10 November of that year. Rashkov founded the Tsar Goro alcohol factory in Stolipinovo in 1989 and was arrested in 1993 for producing 126 tonnes of moonshine, including 140 boxes of brandy. He was subsequently released on bail.

Rashkov was involved in politics from the 1990s onward: in the 1999 local elections, his party, Free Bulgaria, gathered 51,860 votes (1.6% of all votes), with 83 councillors and two mayors from the party. He also participated in the 2001 Bulgarian parliamentary election, during which time the party had 27,636 votes (0.6% of the vote) and failed to win a seat in the National Assembly.

On 23 September 2011, members of Rashkov's crime family in Katunitsa ran over Angel Petrov, killing him. Petrov's murder sparked riots from Bulgarian nationalists in Katunitsa, which subsequently spread throughout Bulgaria. On 24 January 2012, Rashkov was arrested and charged with making death threats against Veselin Hristov (Petrov's father) and Ivanka Petrov by brandishing a knife. He was sentenced to 3.5 years in prison for the death threats. Rashkov's grandson (also named Kiril Rashkov) was arrested in November 2011 for making death threats against Hristov.

Rashkov died on 1 April 2021 in his sleep at his Plovdiv home. His funeral was held on 4 April. He was buried in a mausoleum with suitcases including his personal belongings, gold jewellery, a golden throne, cigars, alcohol and food.
