= Naĭden Vŭlchev =

Bulgarian poet (1927–2025)

Naĭden Stanev Vŭlchev (Bulgarian: Найден Станев Вълчев; 30 August 1927 – 3 December 2025) was a Bulgarian poet and translator.

== Life and career ==
Vŭlchev was born 30 August 1927 in Malka Brestnitsa, Yablanitsa. Throughout his career, he published over twenty poems.

He was the Chairman of the Jury of the National Literary Award for Poetry "Usin Kerim" for 2010.

Vŭlchev died on 3 December 2025, at the age of 98.

== Awards ==
Vŭlchev was a holder of the Order of Saints. Cyril and Methodius – first degree.
