= Tatyana Chervenyakova =

Bulgarian physician (1954–2025)

Tatyana Petrova Penkova-Chervenyakova (Bulgarian: Татяна Петрова Пенкова-Червенякова; 5 June 1954 – 10 August 2025) was a Bulgarian physician.

== Life and work ==
Chervenyakova graduated from the Medical Academy of Sofia in 1978, obtaining a master's degree in medicine. In 1978-1983 she worked as a district pediatrician and resident in the children's department at a hospital in Sofia. She then continued studies, earning a PhD at the Institute of Virology in Moscow.

From 1987 to 2001 she was successively Senior and Chief Assistant Professor at the Department of Infectious Diseases, Epidemiology, Parasitology and Tropical Medicine at MU-Sofia.

Chervenyakova died on 10 August 2025, at the age of 71.
