= Yordan Sokolov =

Bulgarian jurist and politician (1933–2016)

- Йордан Соколов
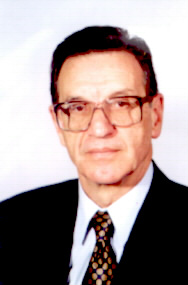

Speaker of Parliament of Bulgaria
- In office 7 May 1997 – 5 July 2001
- President: Petar Stoyanov
- Prime Minister: Ivan Kostov
- Vice President: Todor Kavaldjiev
- Preceded by: Blagovest Sendov
- Succeeded by: Ognyan Gerdzhikov

Minister of Interior of Bulgaria
- In office 8 November 1991 – 30 December 1992
- President: Zhelyu Zhelev
- Prime Minister: Philip Dimitrov
- Preceded by: Hristo Danov
- Succeeded by: Victor Mihailov

Personal details
- Born: 18 January 1933 Sofia, Bulgaria
- Died: 24 February 2016 (aged 83) Sofia, Bulgaria
- Party: Union of Democratic Forces
- Education: Sofia University
- Occupation: Jurist

Yordan Sokolov, (Bulgarian: Йордан Соколов) sometimes spelled as Jordan Sokolov (18 January 1933 – 24 February 2016) was a Bulgarian jurist and politician, Minister of Internal affairs from 1991 to 1992, three mandates as an MP from January 1995 to June 2005, and Speaker (Bulgarian: председател) of Parliament from 1997 to 2001.

He was a graduate of the juridical faculty of Sofia University.

In 2004 together with Ivan Kostov and other MPs Sokolov founded DSB, but in 2005 he left the political scene and returned to lawyer practice. In 2011 he left his posts at DSP and resigned from membership because of the party's united political activities with the Socialists.

He was married to Prof. Eva Sokolova with two daughters until his death in 2016.

== Awards ==
- Order of the Elephant (Denmark)
- Royal Order of the Seraphim (Sweden)
- Great Cross of The Holy Tomb Order of the Jerusalem patriarchy
- Order of Saints Cyril and Methodius
