= Kamen Kostadinov =

Bulgarian politician (1970–2022)

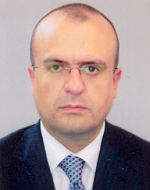
- Kamen Kostadinov

Member of the National Assembly of Bulgaria
- In office 2005–2009

Personal details
- Born: 26 September 1970 Shumen, Bulgaria
- Died: 28 August 2022 (aged 51)
- Party: Movement for Rights and Freedoms
- Education: Veliko Tarnovo University
- Occupation: Lawyer

Kamen Kostov Kostadinov (Bulgarian: Камен Костов Костадинов; 26 September 1970 – 28 August 2022) was a Bulgarian politician. Kostadinov was born on 26 September 1970. He attended the Veliko Tarnovo University. Kostadinov served as a member of the National Assembly of Bulgaria from 2005 to 2009. He also worked as a lawyer. Kostadinov died in August 2022, at the age of 51.
