= Nikola Gigov =

- Born: 10 November 1937; Smolyan, Bulgaria
- Died: 3 December 2016 (aged 79)
- Occupation: Novelist
- Writing career
- Language: Bulgarian
- Notable awards: 100 national and 10 international awards

Nikola Gigov (Bulgarian: Никола Гигов; 10 November 1937 – 3 December 2016) was a Bulgarian poet and writer who won several national and international awards. In his later years, he lived and worked in the town of Smolyan, Bulgaria.

== Works ==
He has authored 46 books. Many of his works have been translated in several languages. Six of his important works deal with Orpheus and are result of 50 years research. Some of these works are:

- "Is Orpheus really a legend?" (Sofia, 1992)
- "Orpheus in Europe" (Sofia, 2000)

One of his most famous works is "Ballad of Resurrection," written in memory of those who had survived in Raikovo and in the surrounding villages.
