= Mincho Panayotov =

Bulgarian painter (1944–2025)

Mincho Panayotov (Bulgarian: Минчо Панайотов; 13 November 1944 – 16 August 2025) was a Bulgarian painter.

== Life and work ==
Panayotov was born on 13 November 1944 in the village of Panaretovtsi, Sliven Province. He graduated from the Faculty of Fine Arts of the University of Veliko Tarnovo. In 1971–1972 he was a curator at the Art Gallery in Sliven. From 1974–1987 he worked as Head of the Department of Decorative Painting, Graphics and Sculpture at the State Art Gallery in Plovdiv (now the City Art Gallery).

He was a part-time lecturer at the University of Plovdiv "Paisii Hilendarski", at the private college "Delta" and others. He was a member of the Union of Bulgarian Artists and the Society of Plovdiv Artists. He was also the founder of the Creative Union "26-5".

Panayotov died on 16 August 2025, at the age of 80.
