= Starshel (magazine) =

Стършел
- Editor in chief: Mikhail Veshim
- Categories: Satire and humor
- Frequency: Weekly
- Publisher: Стършел ООД
- Founded: 1886
- Country: Bulgaria
- Based in: Sofia
- Language: Bulgarian
- Website: http://www.starshel.bg/
- ISSN: 0205-1273

Starshel (Bulgarian: "Стършел", "hornet") is a satirical magazine published in the Bulgaria. Founded in 1886 and published without interruption since 1946, it is the oldest Bulgarian periodical in continuous circulation. The magazines is based in Sofia and is published on a weekly basis.

For a while, it was issued by the Central Committee of the Bulgarian Communist Party.
