= Ognyan Gerdzhikov =

Bulgarian jurist and politician

- Огнян Герджиков
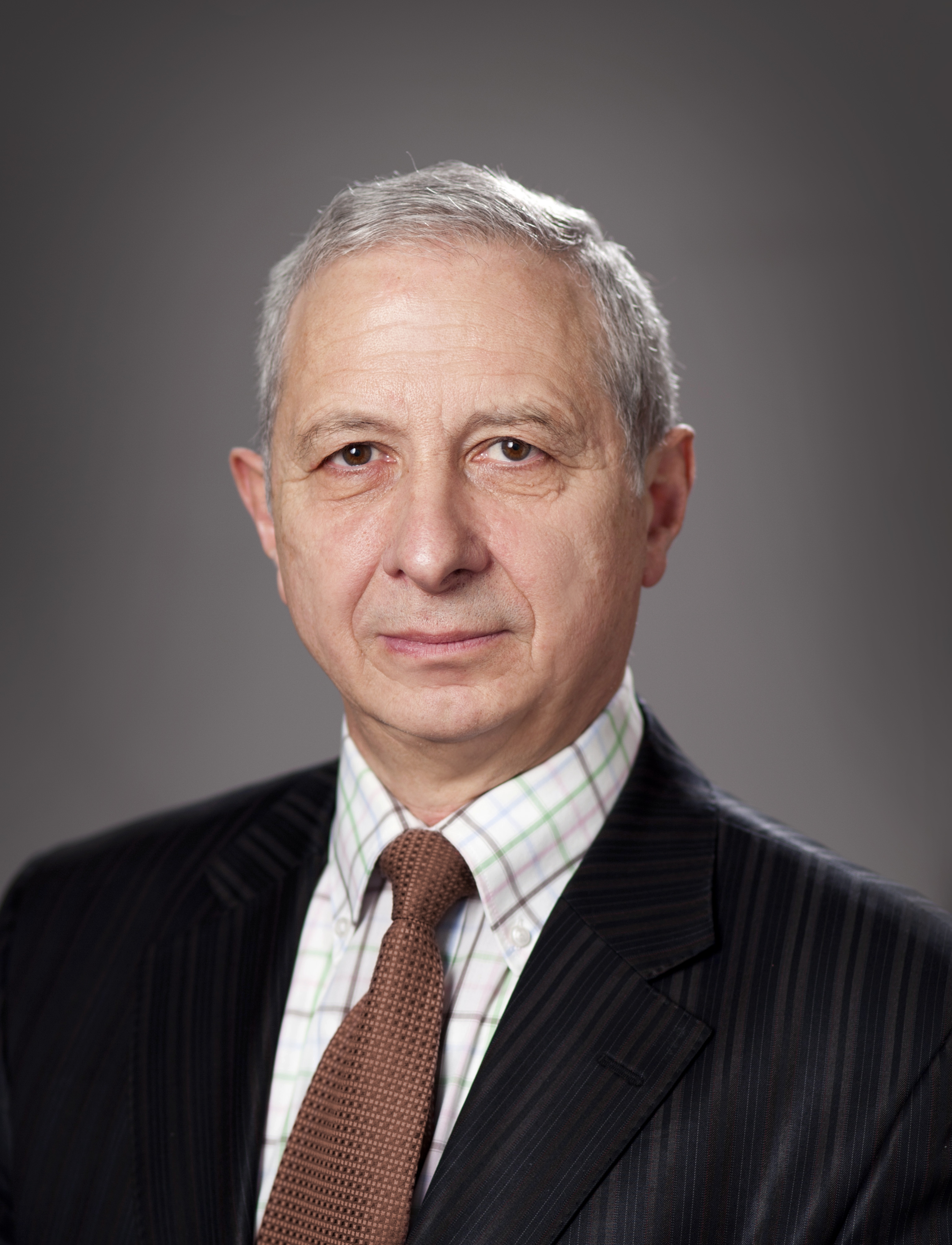
- Official portrait, 2017

Prime Minister of Bulgaria
- Caretaker; 27 January 2017 – 4 May 2017
- President: Rumen Radev
- Deputy: Ilko Semerdzhiev; Stefan Yanev; Malina Krumova; Denitsa Zlateva
- Preceded by: Boyko Borisov
- Succeeded by: Boyko Borisov

Chair of the National Assembly
- In office 5 July 2001 – 4 February 2005
- Preceded by: Yordan Sokolov
- Succeeded by: Borislav Velikov

Personal details
- Born: 19 March 1946 (age 80) Sofia, PR Bulgaria
- Party: National Movement for Stability and Progress
- Other political affiliations: Reformist Bloc (one of the nominations of the Reformist Bloc for the presidential candidate in the November 2016 elections)
- Education: Sofia University

Ognyan Stefanov Gerdzhikov (Bulgarian: Огнян Стефанов Герджиков; born 19 March 1946) is a Bulgarian politician and jurist who served as the interim prime minister from 27 January 2017 to 4 May 2017, following the resignation of Prime Minister Boyko Borisov and the failure of Bulgarian parties to form a government.

== Biography ==
He is a graduate of Sofia University, beginning his career as a lecturer at its juridical faculty in 1979. Since 1994 he has been a professor of legal studies.

Between 5 July 2001 and 4 February 2005, Gerdzhikov served as the chairman of the Bulgarian Parliament. He has been a member of Parliament twice (while affiliated with NDSV).

Gerdzhikov is a holder of the prestigious Order of Stara Planina, receiving the distinction from former president Georgi Parvanov.

In addition to his native Bulgarian, Gerdzhikov is also conversant in German and Russian. His hobbies include table tennis, football, and travelling. Gerdzhikov is married and has one child.

== Bibliography ==
- Prodanov, Vasil; Todorov, Antoniy; Avramov, Yosif; Ivanova, Vanya (2009). Българският парламент и преходът (1st ed.). Sofia: Ciela. ISBN 978-954-28-0352-2.

Political offices
Preceded by Yordan Sokolov	Chair of the National Assembly; 2001–2005	Succeeded by Borislav Velikov
Preceded by Boyko Borisov	Prime Minister of Bulgaria; 2017	Succeeded by Boyko Borisov
