= Unification Day (Bulgaria) =

Public holiday in Bulgaria

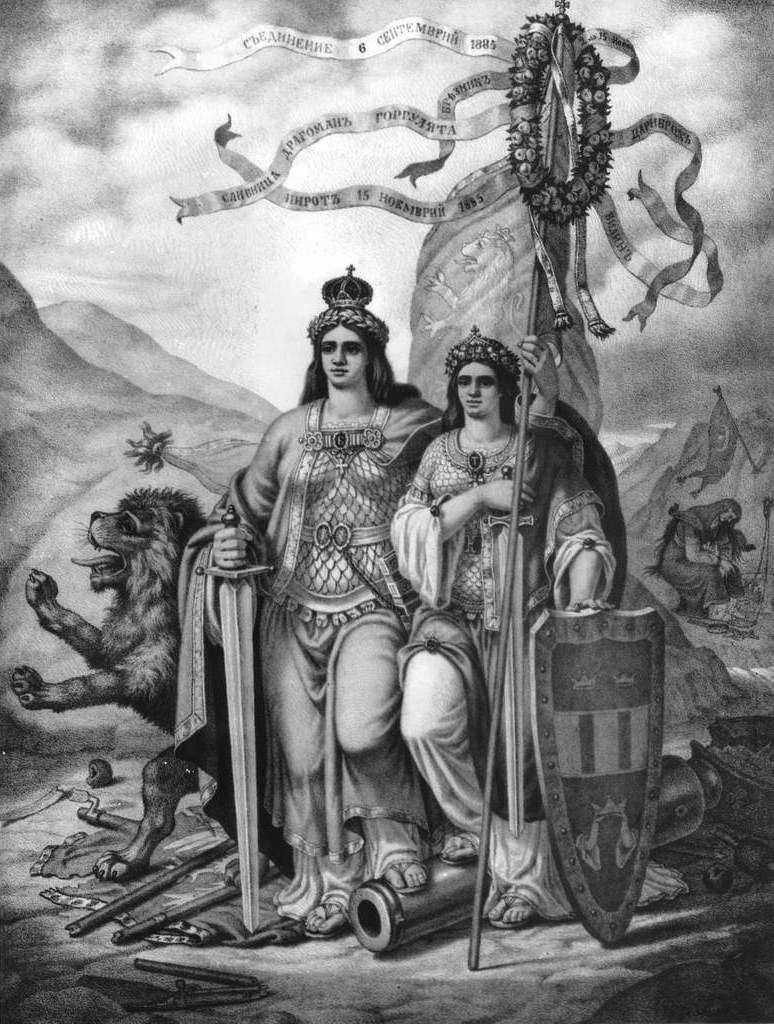
- United Bulgaria, a lithograph by Nikolai Pavlovich (1835–1894)
- Observed by: Bulgaria
- Type: National
- Significance: Honours the Unification of Bulgaria and Eastern Rumelia in 1885
- Date: 6 September
- Next time: 6 September 2026
- Frequency: annual

Unification Day (Bulgarian: Ден на Съединението, romanized: Den na Saedinenieto) on 6 September is a national holiday of Bulgaria. It commemorates the unification of Eastern Rumelia and the Principality of Bulgaria in 1885.

By the terms of the Treaty of Berlin (1878), Southern Bulgaria (named Eastern Roumelia) was separated from the newly formed Bulgarian state and returned to the Ottoman Empire with partial autonomy. Bulgarian citizens considered the decisions of the Berlin Treaty to be unfair and began a peaceful demonstration against them. At first the plan was to annex all territories that Bulgaria had gained after the Treaty of San Stefano but later it became clear that was impossible because of the unsuitable international situation. The Bulgarians had to leave Macedonia and the rest of Thrace and concentrate on the East Roumelian issue. The first actions were taken in 1880 but the sharpened political situation, economic instability and the low prestige of the Bulgarian country delayed the resolution of the so-called "national question". In 1884 the "Macedonian committees" were the main body working on the unsolved problem. On 10 February 1885 led by Zahari Stoyanov a group of former revolutionaries founded in Plovdiv (the capital of Eastern Roumelia) a secret committee known as BSCRC – Bulgarian Secret Central Revolutionary Committee (Bulgarian: БТЦРК – Български Таен Централен Революционен Комитет). It had regulations and programs which were connected to the organisation led by Vasil Levski, Hristo Botev and Lyuben Karavelov before the Liberation. After a few months BSCRC had improved their plan for actions and organised some public events on dates significant to Bulgarians. The conference in Dermendare (Parvanets) on 24–26 July and the next meeting on 23 August declared what should be done and exactly how to proceed. On 5 September 1885 the people rose in Goliamo Konare (Saedinenie) and after arresting the prefect of Plovdiv the militia advanced toward the capital. On 6 September the palace in Plovdiv was surrounded. The governor Gavril Krastevich did not alert the Turks in Istanbul and proclaimed his support of the people's cause. A temporary government headed by Georgi Stranski took control of the situation and armed forces were commanded by major Danail Nikolaev who began preparation for war with the Ottoman Empire. On 8 September knyaz Alexander received a telegram in the old capital Tarnovo which he was already expecting. His army was prepared and waiting for a signal. He agreed to become a leader of the Unified Bulgaria. On the next day (9 September) the knyaz arrived in Plovdiv and the temporary government was dismissed. Diplomatic efforts failed and Bulgaria had to defend its interests on the battlefield in the Serbo-Bulgarian War where the Bulgarians were victorious.

According to information compiled from 2012 to 2019, 25% of Bulgarians celebrated the holiday, with people claiming it was most celebrated in Plovdiv.

== See also ==
- Greater Bulgaria
- Public holidays in Bulgaria
- German Unity Day
- Unity Day (Yemen)
