= Bulgarian Declaration of Independence =

1908 proclamation of Bulgaria's independence from the Ottoman Empire

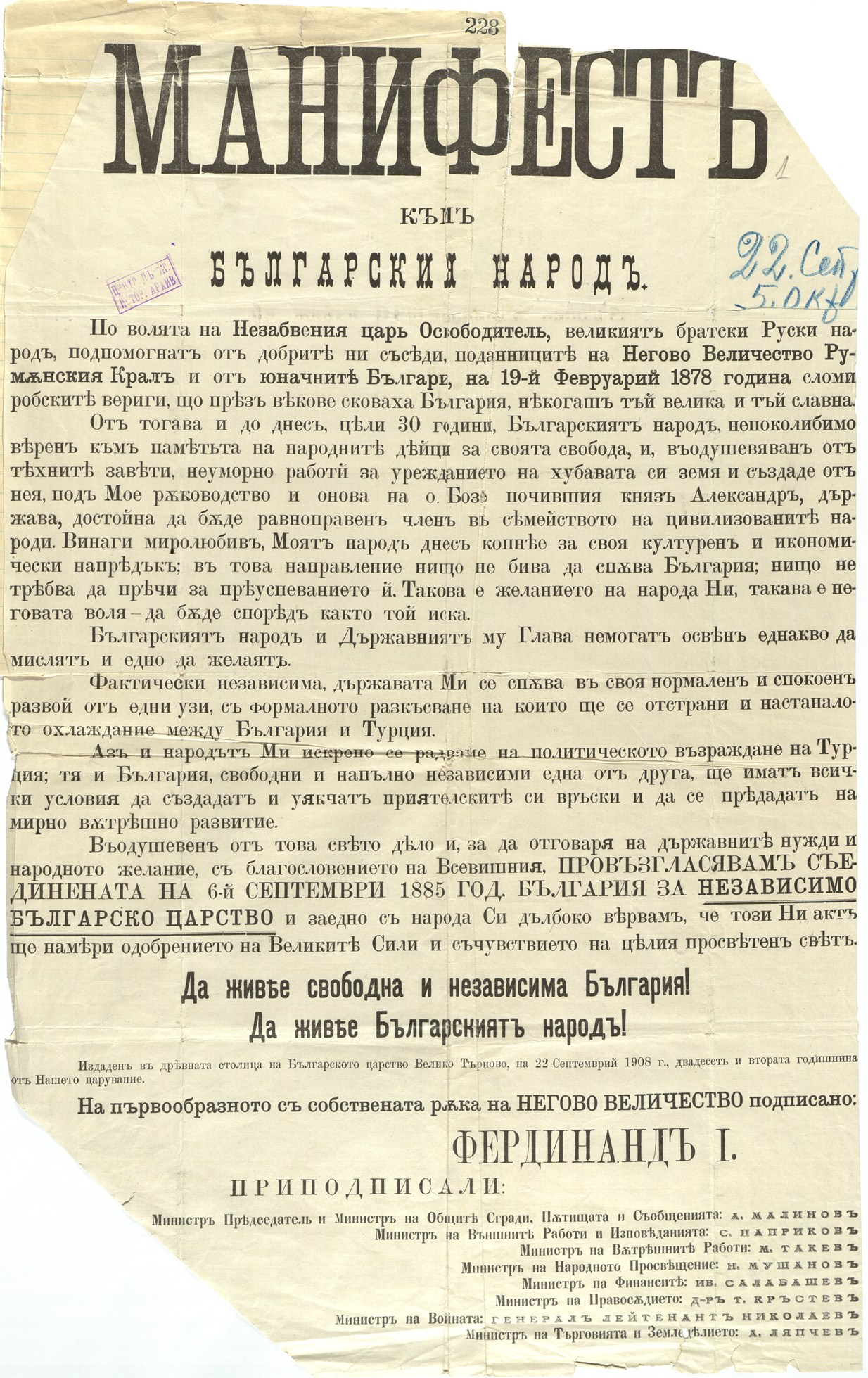
- The declaration (manifesto) of independence
- Created: 5 October [O.S. 22 September] 1908
- Purpose: To announce the de jure independence of Bulgaria from the Ottoman Empire

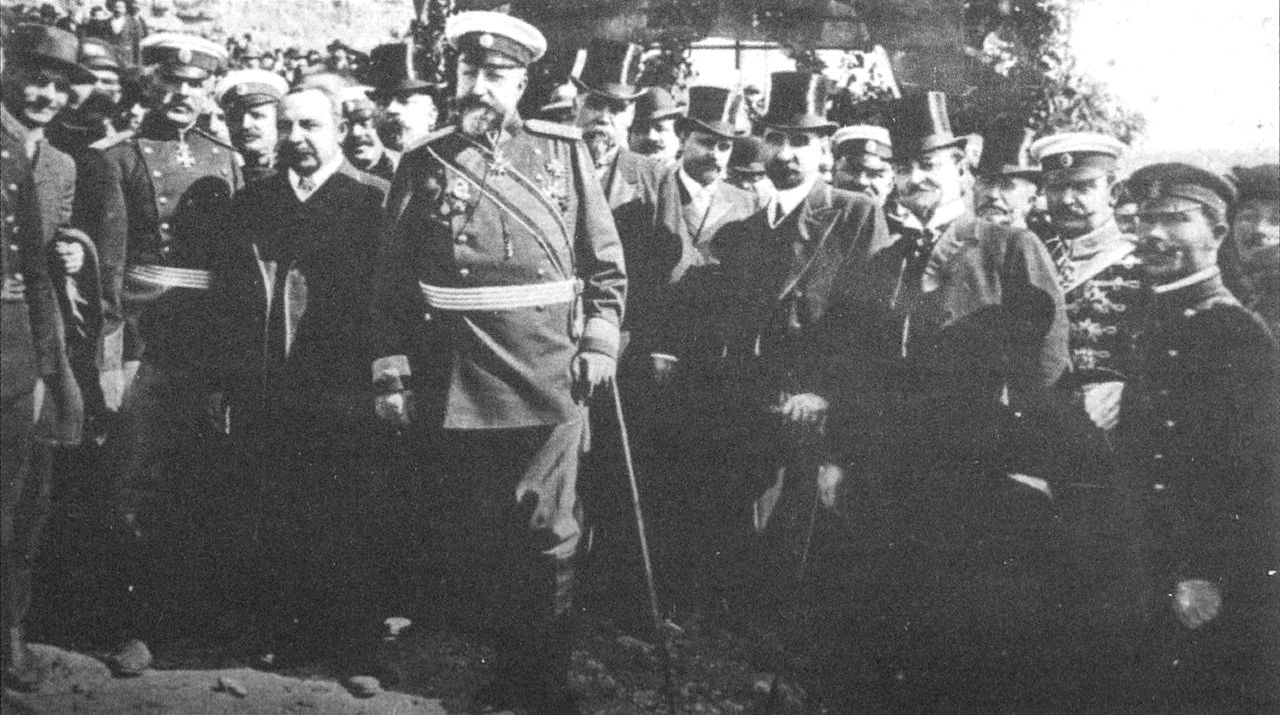
Ferdinand of Bulgaria proclaiming independence in Tarnovo, 1908

The de jure independence of Bulgaria (Bulgarian: Независимост на България, romanized: Nezavisimost na Bǎlgariya) from the Ottoman Empire was proclaimed on 5 October [O.S. 22 September] 1908 in the old capital of Tarnovo by Prince Ferdinand of Bulgaria, who afterwards took the title "Tsar".

== Background ==
Bulgaria had been a widely autonomous principality since 13 July 1878 Congress of Berlin and the end of the Russo-Turkish War (1877–78). Although it was still technically under the suzerainty of the Sublime Porte, this was a legal fiction that Bulgaria only acknowledged in a formal way. Much like the states of the Holy Roman Empire after 1648, Bulgaria de facto acted as an independent principality with its own constitution, flag, and anthem, and conducted a separate foreign policy. From 1880, it also had its own currency. On 18 September [O.S. 6 September] 1885, it had unified with the Bulgarian-majority Ottoman autonomous province of Eastern Rumelia.

After liberation, Bulgaria's main external goal was the unification of all Bulgarian-inhabited areas under foreign rule into a single Bulgarian state: the main targets of Bulgarian irredentism were Macedonia and southern Thrace, which continued to be part of the Ottoman realm. In order to join an anti-Ottoman alliance and claim those territories by war, however, Bulgaria had to proclaim its independence first.

Normally, this would have constituted a violation of the Treaty of Berlin's terms, and would have been unlikely to be approved by the Great Powers. However, the chaos that ensued in the Ottoman Empire following the Young Turk Revolution of 1908 provided suitable conditions for the Bulgarian proclamation of independence. Many of the Great Powers had also abandoned their support for the Ottomans, looking for territorial gains instead: Austria-Hungary was hoping to annex the Bosnia Vilayet, the United Kingdom was looking to seize the empire's Arab territories in the east, and the Russian Empire's main target was control over the Turkish Straits. In September 1908 at a meeting in Buchlov (German: Buchlau, contemporary Czech Republic), envoys of Austria-Hungary and Russia supported each other's plans and agreed not to hinder Bulgaria's proclamation of independence which was likely to take place.

Towards the middle of September, the democratic government of Aleksandar Malinov had decided that the suitable moment was near. 4 October [O.S. 21 September] 1908, Prince Ferdinand arrived at Rousse from a break in his Hungarian mansion. He was awaited there by the government to discuss the final decision on board the Krum ship. The delegation then took the train to Tarnovo, where the official proclamation would take place. According to recent research, it was at the Dve Mogili railway station that the manifesto of independence was completed on 5 October [O.S. 22 September] 1908.

== Independence ==
The independence of Bulgaria was formally proclaimed at the Holy Forty Martyrs Church in Tarnovo. As part of the proclamation, Ferdinand raised Bulgaria from a principality to a kingdom, increasing its international prestige. In a nod to past Bulgarian states, Ferdinand took the title of "tsar," which was translated as "king" outside of Bulgaria. The country would be ready to join the Balkan League and fight the Ottoman Empire in what would become the First Balkan War of 1912–1913.

Bulgaria's declaration of independence was followed by Austria-Hungary's annexation of Bosnia the following day and Greece's union with the Cretan State (unrecognized until 1913). With the two countries' joint violation of the Treaty of Berlin and the dominant support among European countries, the independence of Bulgaria was internationally recognized by the spring of 1909. The Ottoman Empire did not demand any financial compensation from Bulgaria, which took over the railways run by the Oriental Railway Company and the taxes in Eastern Rumelia. Russia cancelled forty years of payments the Ottomans owed on the indemnity for the war of 1877–78. This amounted to 125,000,000 francs (out of a total indemnity of 802,000,000 francs). In turn Bulgaria agreed to transfer its tribute payments—85,000,000 francs over 85 years—to Russia.

Bulgaria's Independence Day is subsequently celebrated annually on 22 September.
