= Liberation Day (Bulgaria) =

Public holiday on 3 March

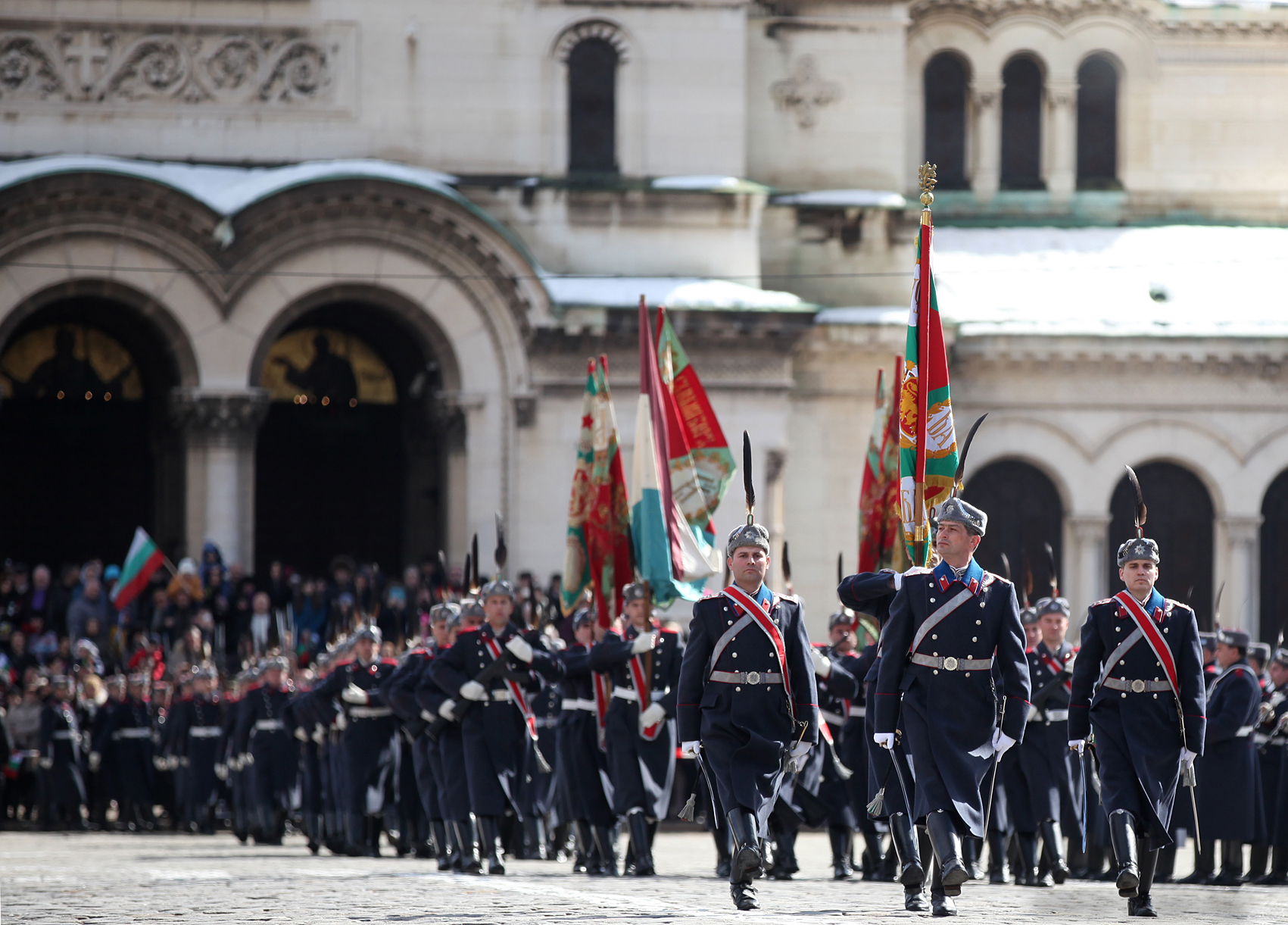
Bulgarian National Guards parading on Liberation Day, 3 March 2018 in Sofia.

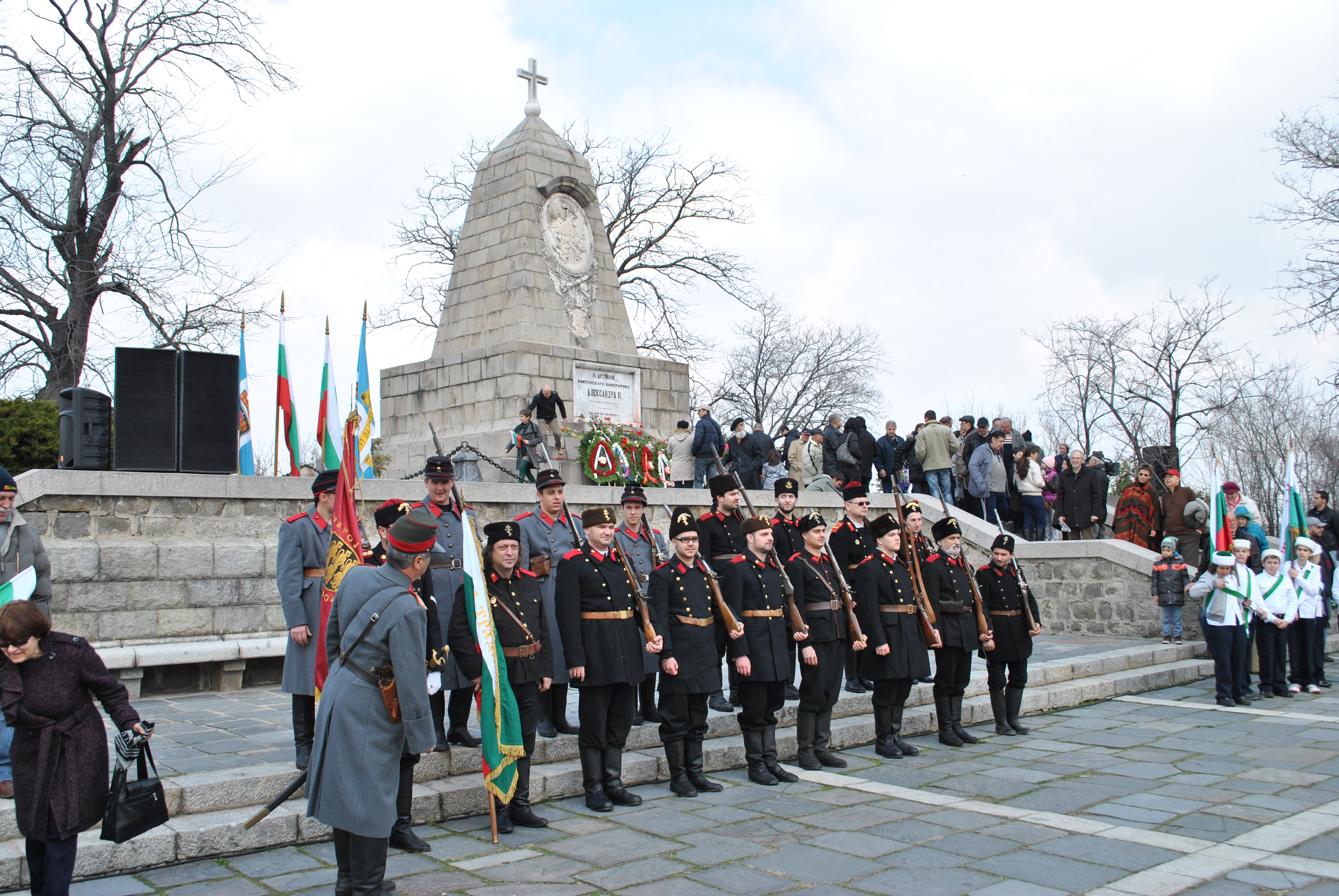
A celebration ceremony for the Liberation Day in Plovdiv, Bulgaria, 3 March 2013.

The Liberation Day, officially known as the Day of Liberation of Bulgaria from the Ottoman Oppression (Bulgarian: Ден на Освобождението на България от османско иго, romanized: Den na Osvobozhdenieto na Bǎlgarya ot osmansko igo), is the national holiday of Bulgaria, celebrated every 3 March.

It commemorates the Liberation of Bulgaria during the events of the Russo-Turkish War (1877–1878) that led to the re-establishment of Bulgarian statehood. The Treaty of San Stefano signed on 3 March 1878 committed the Ottoman Empire to accept the refoundation of the Bulgarian state that was conquered in the 14th century during the Bulgarian–Ottoman wars. It was celebrated for the first time on 19 February 1880 as the Day of Emperor Alexander II's Ascension and the Conclusion of the San Stefano Peace Treaty. It was officially designated as Liberation Day on its 10th anniversary in 1888 by the Principality of Bulgaria. It was only in 1978 when it started to be celebrated on a national scale. It became an official holiday by decree 236 of the Chairman of the State Council on 27 February 1990, coming into effect on 5 March.

In Bulgaria, there are currently over 400 preserved monuments dedicated to the soldiers who fought for its freedom. Every year on 3 March, wreaths are laid at the Shipka Monument and military honors in memory of all soldiers who died fighting for the liberation of Bulgaria. Residents around the country commonly lay flowers and notes at monuments to the fallen foreign troops who fought alongside their Bulgarian counterparts. The Bulgarian Orthodox Church holds special liturgy and prayers on Liberation Day. In the evening, on the National Assembly Square near the monument to the Tsar Liberator, there is a solemn military service which includes the inspection of the National Guards Unit of Bulgaria by the President of Bulgaria and the awarding of military personnel with national decorations. An afternoon flag raising ceremony at the Monument to the Unknown Soldier is also held.
