= Day of Slavonic Alphabet, Bulgarian Enlightenment and Culture =

Public holiday in Bulgaria, 24 May

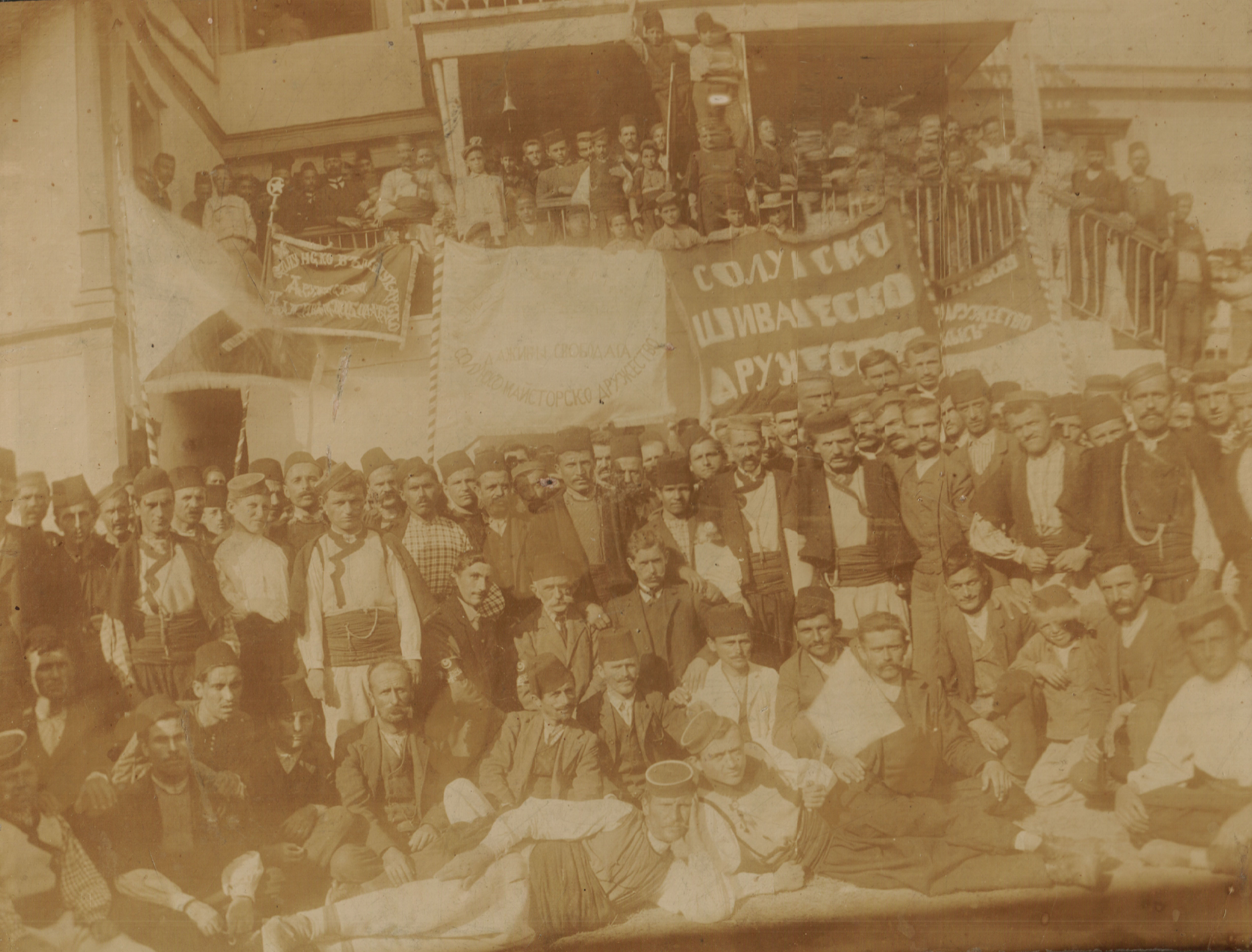
Celebration of the day by Bulgarians in Thessaloniki, in 1906

The Day of Bulgarian Alphabet, Bulgarian Enlightenment and Culture (Bulgarian: Ден на българската просвета и култура и на славянската писменост) has been celebrated in Bulgaria since 11 May 1851 (old style). Today, this holiday is celebrated every year on 24 May (new style) and is an official holiday of Bulgaria since 1990. In 2020, the name was changed to Day of the Holy Brothers Cyril and Methodius, of the Bulgarian alphabet, education and culture and of the Slavonic literature.

Cyril and Methodius had been saints since the 9th century, and the commemoration of their saint's day has been celebrated in Bulgaria since the 12th century.

The preceding centuries would see the Revolutions of 1848 (also known as the "Spring of Nations") and the publication of the Tomos dated 29 June 1850. The first commemoration of the date, initiated by Nayden Gerov, marks the entry of the Bulgarian Revival into its decisive phase in the age of romantic nationalism. It was held in Plovdiv on 11 May 1851, although an Armenian traveler mentioned his visit to the "celebration of the Bulgarian script" in the town of Shumen on 22 May 1803.

Similar days celebrating Slavic writing and culture are observed in North Macedonia, Russia and Serbia.

== See also ==
- Saints Cyril and Methodius
- Early Cyrillic script
