= List of heads of government of Bulgaria =

This is a list of the heads of government of the modern Bulgarian state, from the establishment of the Principality of Bulgaria to the present day.

== List of officeholders ==
=== Principality of Bulgaria (1878–1908) ===
Governments

- Conservative
- Liberal
- Tsankovist/PLP
- NLP
- NP
- Radoslavist
- DP
- Nonpartisan
- Mixed coalition

Portrait	Name (Birth–Death)	Term of office (Note: Old Style and New Style dates are used in line with the calendar of the time.)			Party	Government Composition	Assembly (Election)	Prince (Reign)
Portrait	Name (Birth–Death)	Took office	Left office	Time in office	Party	Government Composition	Assembly (Election)	Prince (Reign)
Chairmen of the Council of Ministers 1879–1908
	Todor Burmov (1834–1906)	5 July 1879	24 November 1879	142 days	Conservative Party	1. Burmov; KP	—	Alexander I (1879–1886)
	Bishop; Kliment of Branitsa (1841–1901)	24 November 1879	26 March 1880	123 days	Conservative Party	2. Kliment I KP	1st (1879)	Alexander I (1879–1886)
	Dragan Tsankov (1828–1911)	26 March 1880	28 November 1880	247 days	Liberal Party	3. D. Tsankov I LP	2nd (1880)	Alexander I (1879–1886)
	Petko Karavelov (1843–1903)	28 November 1880	27 April 1881	150 days	Liberal Party	4. Karavelov I LP	2nd (1880)	Alexander I (1879–1886)
	Lieutenant General; Johan Ehrnrooth (Note: Johan Ehrnrooth was appointed by Prince Alexander I during his authoritarian regime. Ehrnrooth was not elected by the National Assembly.) (1833–1913)	27 April 1881	1 July 1881	65 days	Imperial Russian Army	5. Ehrnrooth; KP	2nd (1880)	Alexander I (1879–1886)
Office vacant, authority exercised by Prince Alexander I.						6. Shesto; KP	2nd Grand (1881)	Alexander I (1879–1886)
	Lieutenant General; Leonid Sobolev (Note: Leonid Sobolev was appointed by Prince Alexander I during his authoritarian regime. Sobolev was not elected by the National Assembly.) (1844–1913)	23 June 1882	7 September 1883	1 year, 76 days	Imperial Russian Army	7. Sobolev; KP until Mar 1883	3rd (1882)	Alexander I (1879–1886)
	Lieutenant General; Leonid Sobolev (1844–1913)	23 June 1882	7 September 1883	1 year, 76 days	Imperial Russian Army	KP−LP from Mar 1883	3rd (1882)	Alexander I (1879–1886)
	Dragan Tsankov (1828–1911)	7 September 1883	31 December 1883	296 days	Liberal Party (Tsankovists)	8. D. Tsankov II; LP−KP	3rd (1882)	Alexander I (1879–1886)
	Dragan Tsankov (1828–1911)	1 January 1884	29 June 1884	296 days	Liberal Party (Tsankovists)	9. D. Tsankov III; LP	3rd (1882)	Alexander I (1879–1886)
	Petko Karavelov (1843–1903)	29 June 1884	9 August 1886	2 years, 41 days	Liberal Party (Karavelists)	10. Karavelov II; LP	4th (1884)	Alexander I (1879–1886)
	Metropolitan; Kliment of Tarnovo (1841–1901)	9 August 1886	12 August 1886	3 days	Tsankovist Party	11. Kliment II; Tsankovists (Note: LP and KP ministers were nominated but they refused to join the government.)	4th (1884)	Alexander I (1879–1886)
	Petko Karavelov (1843–1903)	12 August 1886	16 August 1886	4 days	Liberal Party (Karavelist)	12. Karavelov III; LP−KP	4th (1884)	Alexander I (1879–1886)
	Vasil Radoslavov (1854–1929)	16 August 1886	28 June 1887	316 days	Liberal Party (Stambolovists)	13. Radoslavov I LP–KP	3rd Grand (1886)	Alexander I (1879–1886)
	Vasil Radoslavov (1854–1929)	16 August 1886	28 June 1887	316 days	Liberal Party (Stambolovists)	13. Radoslavov I LP–KP	3rd Grand (1886)	Regency council (1886–1887)
	Vasil Radoslavov (1854–1929)	16 August 1886	28 June 1887	316 days	Liberal Party (Stambolovists)	13. Radoslavov I LP–KP	3rd Grand (1886)	Ferdinand I (1887–1908)
	Konstantin Stoilov (1853–1901)	28 June 1887	20 August 1887	53 days	Conservative Party	14. Stoilov I KP–LP	3rd Grand (1886)	Ferdinand I (1887–1908)
	Stefan Stambolov (1854–1895)	20 August 1887	19 May 1894	6 years, 272 days	Liberal Party (Stambolovists)	15. Stambolov; LP–KP until Dec 1888; LP until Oct 1890	5th (1887)	Ferdinand I (1887–1908)
	Stefan Stambolov (1854–1895)	20 August 1887	19 May 1894	6 years, 272 days	People's Liberal Party	NLP from Oct 1890	6th (1890)	Ferdinand I (1887–1908)
	Stefan Stambolov (1854–1895)	20 August 1887	19 May 1894	6 years, 272 days	People's Liberal Party	NLP from Oct 1890	4th Grand (1893 Apr)	Ferdinand I (1887–1908)
	Stefan Stambolov (1854–1895)	20 August 1887	19 May 1894	6 years, 272 days	People's Liberal Party	NLP from Oct 1890	7th (1893 Jul)	Ferdinand I (1887–1908)
	Konstantin Stoilov (1853–1901)	19 May 1894	9 December 1894	4 years, 244 days	Conservative Party	16. Stoilov II; KP–UP–LP (R)	8th (1894)	Ferdinand I (1887–1908)
	Konstantin Stoilov (1853–1901)	9 December 1894	18 January 1899	4 years, 244 days	Conservative Party	16. Stoilov II; KP–UP–LP (R)	8th (1894)	Ferdinand I (1887–1908)
	Konstantin Stoilov (1853–1901)	9 December 1894	18 January 1899	4 years, 244 days	People's Party	17. Stoilov III; NP	8th (1894)	Ferdinand I (1887–1908)
	Konstantin Stoilov (1853–1901)	9 December 1894	18 January 1899	4 years, 244 days	People's Party	17. Stoilov III; NP	9th (1896)	Ferdinand I (1887–1908)
	Dimitar Grekov (1847–1901)	18 January 1899	1 October 1899	256 days	People's Liberal Party	18. Grekov; NLP–LP (R)	10th (1899)	Ferdinand I (1887–1908)
	Todor Ivanchov (1858–1905)	1 October 1899	27 November 1900	1 year, 103 days	Liberal Party (Radoslavists)	19. Ivanchov I LP (R)	10th (1899)	Ferdinand I (1887–1908)
	Todor Ivanchov (1858–1905)	27 November 1900	12 January 1901	1 year, 103 days	Liberal Party (Radoslavists)	20. Ivanchov II; LP (R)	10th (1899)	Ferdinand I (1887–1908)
	Major General; Racho Petrov (1861–1942)	12 January 1901	20 February 1901	39 days	Independent	21. Petrov I Nonpartisan	10th (1899)	Ferdinand I (1887–1908)
	Petko Karavelov (1843–1903)	20 February 1901	21 December 1901	304 days	Democratic Party	22. Karavelov IV; DP–PLP	11th (1901)	Ferdinand I (1887–1908)
	Stoyan Danev (1858–1949)	21 December 1901	2 November 1902	1 year, 136 days	Progressive Liberal Party	23. Danev I PLP	12th (1902)	Ferdinand I (1887–1908)
	Stoyan Danev (1858–1949)	2 November 1902	18 March 1903	1 year, 136 days	Progressive Liberal Party	24. Danev II; PLP	12th (1902)	Ferdinand I (1887–1908)
	Stoyan Danev (1858–1949)	18 March 1903	6 May 1903	1 year, 136 days	Progressive Liberal Party	25. Danev III; PLP	12th (1902)	Ferdinand I (1887–1908)
	Major General; Racho Petrov (1861–1942)	6 May 1903	23 October 1906	3 years, 170 days	Independent	26. Petrov II; NLP	13th (1903)	Ferdinand I (1887–1908)
	Dimitar Petkov (1858–1907)	23 October 1906	26 February 1907†	126 days	People's Liberal Party	27. Petkov; NLP	13th (1903)	Ferdinand I (1887–1908)
	Dimitar Stanchov (1863–1940); Acting	27 February 1907	3 March 1907	4 days	Independent	28. Stanchov; NLP	13th (1903)	Ferdinand I (1887–1908)
	Petar Gudev (1863–1932)	3 March 1907	16 January 1908	319 days	People's Liberal Party	29. Gudev; NLP	13th (1903)	Ferdinand I (1887–1908)
	Aleksandar Malinov (1867–1938)	16 January 1908	22 September 1908	250 days	Democratic Party	30. Malinov I DP	14th (1908)	Ferdinand I (1887–1908)

=== Kingdom of Bulgaria (1908–1946) ===
Governments

- Democratic Party
- NP–PLP alliance
- Liberal Concentration
- Democratic Alliance
- Popular Bloc
- Nonpartisan
- Fatherland Front
- Mixed coalition

Portrait	Name (Birth–Death)	Term of office			Party	Government Composition	Election	Tsar (Reign)
Portrait	Name (Birth–Death)	Took office	Left office	Time in office	Party	Government Composition	Election	Tsar (Reign)
Chairmen of the Council of Ministers 1908–1946
	Aleksandar Malinov (1867–1938)	22 September 1908	5 September 1910	2 years, 175 days	Democratic Party	30. Malinov I DP	14th (1908)	Ferdinand I (1908–1918)
	Aleksandar Malinov (1867–1938)	5 September 1910	16 March 1911	2 years, 175 days	Democratic Party	31. Malinov II; DP	14th (1908)	Ferdinand I (1908–1918)
	Ivan Evstratiev Geshov (1849–1924)	16 March 1911	1 June 1913	2 years, 77 days	People's Party	32. Geshov; NP–PLP	15th (1911)	Ferdinand I (1908–1918)
	Stoyan Danev (1858–1949)	1 June 1913	4 July 1913	33 days	Progressive Liberal Party	33. Danev IV; PLP–NP	15th (1911)	Ferdinand I (1908–1918)
	Vasil Radoslavov (1854–1929)	4 July 1913	23 December 1914	4 years, 339 days	Liberal Party (Radoslavists)	34. Radoslavov II; LP (r.)–NLP–MLP	16th (1913)	Ferdinand I (1908–1918)
	Vasil Radoslavov (1854–1929)	5 January 1914 [O.S. 23 December 1913]	21 June [O.S. 8 June] 1918	4 years, 339 days	Liberal Party (Radoslavists)	35. Radoslavov III; LP (r.)–NLP–MLP	17th (1914)	Ferdinand I (1908–1918)
	Aleksandar Malinov (1867–1938)	21 June 1918	17 October 1918	160 days	Democratic Party	36. Malinov III; DP–RP	17th (1914)	Ferdinand I (1908–1918)
	Aleksandar Malinov (1867–1938)	21 June 1918	17 October 1918	160 days	Democratic Party	36. Malinov III; DP–RP	17th (1914)	Boris III (1918–1943)
	Aleksandar Malinov (1867–1938)	17 October 1918	28 November 1918	160 days	Democratic Party	37. Malinov IV; DP–NP–BZNS–BRSDP–BZNS	17th (1914)	Boris III (1918–1943)
	Teodor Teodorov (1869–1924)	28 November 1918	7 May 1919	312 days	People's Party	38. Teodorov I NP–BZNS–DP–RP–BRSDP–PLP	17th (1914)	Boris III (1918–1943)
	Teodor Teodorov (1869–1924)	7 May 1919	6 October 1919	312 days	People's Party	39. Teodorov II; NP–BZNS–DP–RP–BRSDP–PLP	17th (1914)	Boris III (1918–1943)
	Aleksandar Stamboliyski (1879–1923)	6 October 1919	9 February 1923	3 years, 246 days	Bulgarian Agrarian National Union	40. Stamboliyski I BZNS–NP–PLP	18th (1919)	Boris III (1918–1943)
	Aleksandar Stamboliyski (1879–1923)	6 October 1919	9 February 1923	3 years, 246 days	Bulgarian Agrarian National Union	40. Stamboliyski I BZNS–NP–PLP	19th (1920)	Boris III (1918–1943)
	Aleksandar Stamboliyski (1879–1923)	9 February 1923	9 June 1923 (Deposed)	3 years, 246 days	Bulgarian Agrarian National Union	41. Stamboliyski II; BZNS	20th (Apr 1923)	Boris III (1918–1943)
	Aleksandar Tsankov (1879–1959)	9 June 1923	4 January 1926	2 years, 209 days	Democratic Alliance	42. A. Tsankov I; 43. A. Tsankov II; DA–NLP–BRSDP–DP–RP–ONPP	1923 (Nov)	Boris III (1918–1943)
	Andrey Lyapchev (1866–1933)	4 January 1926	29 June 1931	5 years, 176 days	Democratic Alliance	44. Lyapchev I; 45. Lyapchev II; 46. Lyapchev III; DA	1927	Boris III (1918–1943)
	Aleksandar Malinov (1867–1938)	29 June 1931	12 October 1931	105 days	Democratic Party	47. Malinov V DP–BZNS–NLP–RP	1931	Boris III (1918–1943)
	Nikola Mushanov (1872–1951)	12 October 1931	19 May 1934 (Deposed)	2 years, 219 days	Democratic Party	48. Mushanov I; 49. Mushanov II; 50. Mushanov III; DP–BZNS–NLP–RP	—	Boris III (1918–1943)
	Kimon Georgiev (1882–1969)	19 May 1934	22 January 1935	248 days	Independent	51. Georgiev I Nonpartisan	—	Boris III (1918–1943)
	Pencho Zlatev (1881–1948)	22 January 1935	21 April 1935	89 days	Bulgarian Army	52. Zlatev; Nonpartisan	—	Boris III (1918–1943)
	Andrey Toshev (1867–1944)	21 April 1935	23 November 1935	216 days	Independent	53. Toshev; Nonpartisan	—	Boris III (1918–1943)
	Georgi Kyoseivanov (1884–1960)	23 November 1935	16 February 1940	4 years, 85 days	Independent	54. Kyoseivanov I; 55. Kyoseivanov II; 56. Kyoseivanov III; 57. Kyoseivanov IV; Nonpartisan	1938; 1939	Boris III (1918–1943)
	Bogdan Filov (1883–1945)	16 February 1940	9 September 1943	3 years, 205 days	Independent	58. Filov I; 59. Filov II; Nonpartisan	—	Boris III (1918–1943)
	Bogdan Filov (1883–1945)	16 February 1940	9 September 1943	3 years, 205 days	Independent	58. Filov I; 59. Filov II; Nonpartisan	—	Simeon II (1943–1946)
	Petar Gabrovski (1898–1945); Acting	9 September 1943	14 September 1943	5 days	Independent	58. Filov I; 59. Filov II; Nonpartisan	—	Simeon II (1943–1946)
	Dobri Bozhilov (1884–1945)	14 September 1943	1 June 1944	261 days	Independent	60. Bozhilov; Nonpartisan	—	Simeon II (1943–1946)
	Ivan Ivanov Bagryanov (1891–1945)	1 June 1944	2 September 1944	93 days	Independent	61. Bagryanov; Nonpartisan	—	Simeon II (1943–1946)
	Konstantin Muraviev (1893–1965)	2 September 1944	9 September 1944 (Deposed)	7 days	Bulgarian Agrarian National Union	62. Muraviev; BZNS–DP	—	Simeon II (1943–1946)
	Kimon Georgiev (1882–1969)	9 September 1944	15 September 1946	2 years, 6 days	Zveno	63. Georgiev II; 64. Georgiev III; Zveno–BKP–BZNS–RP–BRSDP	1945	Simeon II (1943–1946)

=== People's Republic of Bulgaria (1946–1990) ===
Governments

- Fatherland Front

Portrait	Name (Birth–Death)	Term of office			Party	Government Composition	Election	Head of State (Tenure)
Portrait	Name (Birth–Death)	Took office	Left office	Time in office	Party	Government Composition	Election	Head of State (Tenure)
Chairmen of the Council of Ministers 1946–1990
	Kimon Georgiev (1882–1969)	15 September 1946	23 November 1946	69 days	Zveno	64. Georgiev III; Zveno–BKP–BZNS–RP–BRSDP	—	Vasil Kolarov (1946–1947)
	Georgi Dimitrov (1882–1949)	23 November 1946	2 July 1949†	2 years, 221 days	Bulgarian Communist Party	65. Dimitrov I; 66. Dimitrov II; BKP–Zveno–BZNS–BRSDP	1946	Vasil Kolarov (1946–1947)
	Georgi Dimitrov (1882–1949)	23 November 1946	2 July 1949†	2 years, 221 days	Bulgarian Communist Party	65. Dimitrov I; 66. Dimitrov II; BKP–Zveno–BZNS–BRSDP	1946	Mincho Neychev (1947–1950)
	Vasil Kolarov (1877–1950)	2 July 1949; Acting until 20 July 1949	23 January 1950†	205 days	Bulgarian Communist Party	67. Kolarov I; 68. Kolarov II; BKP–BZNS	1949	Mincho Neychev (1947–1950)
	Valko Chervenkov (1900–1980)	23 January 1950; Acting until 3 February 1950	17 April 1956	6 years, 85 days	Bulgarian Communist Party	69. Chervenkov; BKP–BZNS	1953	Mincho Neychev (1947–1950)
	Valko Chervenkov (1900–1980)	23 January 1950; Acting until 3 February 1950	17 April 1956	6 years, 85 days	Bulgarian Communist Party	69. Chervenkov; BKP–BZNS	1953	Georgi Damyanov (1950–1958)
	Anton Yugov (1904–1991)	17 April 1956	19 November 1962	6 years, 216 days	Bulgarian Communist Party	70. Yugov I; 71. Yugov II; 72. Yugov III; BKP–BZNS	1957	Georgi Damyanov (1950–1958)
	Anton Yugov (1904–1991)	17 April 1956	19 November 1962	6 years, 216 days	Bulgarian Communist Party	70. Yugov I; 71. Yugov II; 72. Yugov III; BKP–BZNS	1957	Dimitar Ganev (1958–1964)
	Todor Zhivkov (1911–1998)	19 November 1962	7 July 1971	8 years, 230 days	Bulgarian Communist Party	73. Zhivkov I; 74. Zhivkov II; BKP–BZNS	1962; 1966	Dimitar Ganev (1958–1964)
	Todor Zhivkov (1911–1998)	19 November 1962	7 July 1971	8 years, 230 days	Bulgarian Communist Party	73. Zhivkov I; 74. Zhivkov II; BKP–BZNS	1962; 1966	Georgi Traykov (1964–1971)
	Stanko Todorov (1920–1996)	7 July 1971	16 June 1981	9 years, 344 days	Bulgarian Communist Party	75. Todorov I; 76. Todorov II; BKP–BZNS	1971; 1976	Todor Zhivkov (1971–1989)
	Grisha Filipov (1919–1994)	16 June 1981	21 March 1986	4 years, 278 days	Bulgarian Communist Party	77. Filipov; BKP–BZNS	1981	Todor Zhivkov (1971–1989)
	Georgi Atanasov (1933–2022)	21 March 1986	3 February 1990	3 years, 319 days	Bulgarian Communist Party	78. Atanasov; BKP–BZNS	1986	Todor Zhivkov (1971–1989)
	Georgi Atanasov (1933–2022)	21 March 1986	3 February 1990	3 years, 319 days	Bulgarian Communist Party	78. Atanasov; BKP–BZNS	1986	Petar Mladenov (1989–1990)
	Andrey Lukanov (1938–1996)	3 February 1990	15 November 1990	285 days	Bulgarian Communist Party	79. Lukanov I; 80. Lukanov II	1986	Petar Mladenov (1989–1990)
	Andrey Lukanov (1938–1996)	3 February 1990	15 November 1990	285 days	Bulgarian Socialist Party	79. Lukanov I; 80. Lukanov II	1986	Zhelyu Zhelev (1990)

=== Republic of Bulgaria (1990–present) ===
Governments

- BSP/Democratic Left
- United Democratic Forces
- GERB
- PB
- Mixed coalition
- Caretaker

Portrait	Name (Birth–Death)	Term of office			Party	Government Composition	Assembly (Election)	President (Tenure)
Portrait	Name (Birth–Death)	Took office	Left office	Time in office	Party	Government Composition	Assembly (Election)	President (Tenure)
Chairmen of the Council of Ministers 1990–1991
	Andrey Lukanov (1938–1996)	15 November 1990	7 December 1990	22 days	Bulgarian Socialist Party	80. Lukanov II; BSP	N/A	Zhelyu Zhelev (1990–1997)
	Dimitar Popov (1927–2015)	7 December 1990	8 November 1991	336 days	Independent	81. Popov; BSP–SDS–BZNS	7th Grand (1990)	Zhelyu Zhelev (1990–1997)
Prime Ministers 1991–onwards								Zhelyu Zhelev (1990–1997)
	Philip Dimitrov (born 1955)	8 November 1991	30 December 1992	1 year, 52 days	Union of Democratic Forces	82. Dimitrov; SDS–RDP–DP	36th (1991)	Zhelyu Zhelev (1990–1997)
	Lyuben Berov (1925–2006)	30 December 1992	17 October 1994	1 year, 291 days	Independent (Note: Nominated by the Movement for Rights and Freedoms)	83. Berov	36th (1991)	Zhelyu Zhelev (1990–1997)
	Reneta Indzhova (born 1953); Caretaker Prime Minister	17 October 1994	25 January 1995	100 days	Independent	84. Indzhova (Note: Interim government, appointed by president Zhelyu Zhelev, following the resignation of Lyuben Berov.)	36th (1991)	Zhelyu Zhelev (1990–1997)
	Zhan Videnov (born 1959)	25 January 1995	13 February 1997	2 years, 19 days	Bulgarian Socialist Party	85. Videnov; BSP–BZNS-AS–Ecoglasnost	37th (1994)	Zhelyu Zhelev (1990–1997)
	Zhan Videnov (born 1959)	25 January 1995	13 February 1997	2 years, 19 days	Bulgarian Socialist Party	85. Videnov; BSP–BZNS-AS–Ecoglasnost	37th (1994)	Petar Stoyanov (1997–2002)
	Stefan Sofiyanski (born 1951); Caretaker Prime Minister	13 February 1997	21 May 1997	97 days	Union of Democratic Forces	86. Sofiyanski (Note: Interim government, appointed by president Petar Stoyanov, following the resignation of Zhan Videnov.); SDS	37th (1994)	Petar Stoyanov (1997–2002)
	Ivan Kostov (born 1949)	21 May 1997	24 July 2001	4 years, 64 days	Union of Democratic Forces	87. Kostov; SDS–DP–BZNS	38th (1997)	Petar Stoyanov (1997–2002)
	Simeon Sakskoburggotski (born 1937)	24 July 2001	16 August 2005	4 years, 23 days	National Movement Simeon II	88. Sakskoburggotski; NDSV–DPS	39th (2001)	Petar Stoyanov (1997–2002)
	Simeon Sakskoburggotski (born 1937)	24 July 2001	16 August 2005	4 years, 23 days	National Movement Simeon II	88. Sakskoburggotski; NDSV–DPS	39th (2001)	Georgi Parvanov (2002–2012)
	Sergey Stanishev (born 1966)	16 August 2005	27 July 2009	3 years, 345 days	Bulgarian Socialist Party	89. Stanishev; BSP–NDSV–DPS	40th (2005)	Georgi Parvanov (2002–2012)
	Boyko Borisov (born 1959)	27 July 2009	13 March 2013	3 years, 229 days	GERB	90. Borisov I GERB	41st (2009)	Georgi Parvanov (2002–2012)
	Boyko Borisov (born 1959)	27 July 2009	13 March 2013	3 years, 229 days	GERB	90. Borisov I GERB	41st (2009)	Rosen Plevneliev (2012–2017)
	Marin Raykov (born 1960); Caretaker Prime Minister	13 March 2013	29 May 2013	77 days	Independent	91. Raykov (Note: Interim government, appointed by president Rosen Plevneliev, following the resignation of Boyko Borisov.)	41st (2009)	Rosen Plevneliev (2012–2017)
	Plamen Oresharski (born 1960)	29 May 2013	6 August 2014	1 year, 69 days	Independent (Note: Nominated by the Bulgarian Socialist Party)	92. Oresharski; BSP–DPS	42nd (2013)	Rosen Plevneliev (2012–2017)
	Georgi Bliznashki (born 1956); Caretaker Prime Minister	6 August 2014	7 November 2014	93 days	Independent	93. Bliznashki (Note: Interim government, appointed by president Rosen Plevneliev, following the resignation of Plamen Oresharski.)	42nd (2013)	Rosen Plevneliev (2012–2017)
	Boyko Borisov (born 1959)	7 November 2014	27 January 2017	2 years, 81 days	GERB	94. Borisov II; GERB–RB–ABV	43rd (2014)	Rosen Plevneliev (2012–2017)
	Boyko Borisov (born 1959)	7 November 2014	27 January 2017	2 years, 81 days	GERB	94. Borisov II; GERB–RB–ABV	43rd (2014)	Rumen Radev (2017–2026)
	Ognyan Gerdzhikov (born 1946); Caretaker Prime Minister	27 January 2017	4 May 2017	97 days	Independent	95. Gerdzhikov (Note: Interim government, appointed by president Rumen Radev, following the resignation of Boyko Borisov.)	43rd (2014)	Rumen Radev (2017–2026)
	Boyko Borisov (born 1959)	4 May 2017	12 May 2021	4 years, 8 days	GERB	96. Borisov III; GERB–OP	44th (2017)	Rumen Radev (2017–2026)
	Stefan Yanev (born 1960); Caretaker Prime Minister	12 May 2021	16 September 2021	215 days	Independent	97. Yanev I (Note: Interim government, appointed by president Rumen Radev, when no party was able to form a government in the 45th National Assembly.)	45th (Apr 2021)	Rumen Radev (2017–2026)
	Stefan Yanev (born 1960); Caretaker Prime Minister	16 September 2021	13 December 2021	215 days	Independent	98. Yanev II (Note: Interim government, appointed by president Rumen Radev, when no party was able to form a government in the 46th National Assembly.)	46th (Jul 2021)	Rumen Radev (2017–2026)
	Kiril Petkov (born 1980)	13 December 2021	1 August 2022	231 days	We Continue the Change	99. Petkov; PP–BSP–ITN–DB	47th (Nov 2021)	Rumen Radev (2017–2026)
	Galab Donev (born 1967); Caretaker Prime Minister	2 August 2022	2 February 2023	308 days	Independent	100. Donev I (Note: Interim government, appointed by president Rumen Radev, following the resignation of Kiril Petkov.)	47th (Nov 2021)	Rumen Radev (2017–2026)
	Galab Donev (born 1967); Caretaker Prime Minister	2 February 2023	6 June 2023	308 days	Independent	101. Donev II (Note: Interim government, appointed by president Rumen Radev, when no party was able to form a government in the 48th National Assembly.)	48th (2022)	Rumen Radev (2017–2026)
	Nikolai Denkov (born 1962)	6 June 2023	9 April 2024	308 days	We Continue the Change	102. Denkov; PP–DB–GERB	49th (2023)	Rumen Radev (2017–2026)
	Dimitar Glavchev (born 1963); Caretaker Prime Minister	9 April 2024	27 August 2024	282 days	Independent	103. Glavchev I (Note: Interim government, appointed by president Rumen Radev, following the resignation of Nikolay Denkov.)	49th (2023)	Rumen Radev (2017–2026)
	Dimitar Glavchev (born 1963); Caretaker Prime Minister	27 August 2024	16 January 2025	282 days	Independent	104. Glavchev II (Note: Interim government, appointed by president Rumen Radev, when no party was able to form a government in the 50th National Assembly.)	50th (Jun 2024)	Rumen Radev (2017–2026)
	Rosen Zhelyazkov (born 1968)	16 January 2025	19 February 2026	1 year, 34 days	GERB	105. Zhelyazkov; GERB–BSP–ITN	51st (Oct 2024)	Rumen Radev (2017–2026)
	Rosen Zhelyazkov (born 1968)	16 January 2025	19 February 2026	1 year, 34 days	GERB	105. Zhelyazkov; GERB–BSP–ITN	51st (Oct 2024)	Iliana Iotova (2026–present)
	Andrey Gyurov (born 1975); Caretaker Prime Minister	19 February 2026	8 May 2026	78 days	Independent	106. Gyurov (Note: Interim government, appointed by president Iliana Iotova, following the resignation of Rosen Zhelyazkov.)	51st (Oct 2024)	Iliana Iotova (2026–present)
	Rumen Radev (born 1963)	8 May 2026	Incumbent	186 days	Progressive Bulgaria	107. Radev; PB	52nd (2026)	Iliana Iotova (2026–present)

== See also ==
- Government of Bulgaria
- History of Bulgaria
- Politics of Bulgaria
- List of Bulgarian monarchs
- President of Bulgaria
- List of heads of state of Bulgaria
- List of presidents of Bulgaria (1990–present)
- Prime Minister of Bulgaria
