= 1931 Bulgarian parliamentary election =

- 21 June 1931
- All 274 seats in the National Assembly; 138 seats needed for a majority
- Turnout: 85.21%
Party	Leader	Vote %	Seats
People's Bloc	Aleksandar Malinov; Dimitar Gichev	48.35	151
People's Coalition	Andrey Lyapchev; Boyan Smilov	31.20	82
Workers' Party	Vasil Kolarov	12.93	31
BRSDP (o)	Yanko Sakazov	2.11	5
Socialist Federation	Konstantin Stanishev (Note: Leader of the Macedonian parliamentary group)	2.05	5
This lists parties that won seats. See the complete results below.
Prime Minister before	Prime Minister after
Andrey Lyapchev; Lyapchev III (DA-NLP (S))	Aleksandar Malinov; Malinov V (DP-BZNS-V1-NLP (P)-RP)

Parliamentary elections were held in Bulgaria on 21 June 1931 to elect members of the XXIII Ordinary National Assembly. The result was a victory for the Popular Bloc, an alliance of the Bulgarian Agrarian National Union (Dragiev), the Democratic Party, the National Liberal Party (Petrov) and the Radical Democratic Party. Voter turnout was 85%. In addition to being elected proportionally in each constituency, 45 seats were allocated based on the national vote with a 2% threshold, to offset the disproportionality of the system.

This would be the last officially partisan election held in Bulgaria before World War II (the 1939 elections were officially nonpartisan, but candidates representing parties ran as individuals). By the time of the next elections in which parties were formally allowed to take part, in 1945, the country had been through two dictatorships and a third, Communist one was rapidly consolidating. As a result, the 1931 election was also the last free election held in the country until 1990.

== Results ==
Party	Votes	%	Seats		
Party	Votes	%	Districts	National List	Total
People's Bloc (DP–BZNS (Dragiev)–NLP (Petrov)–RP)	625,553	48.35	151	0	151
People's Coalition (DA–NLP (Smilov)) (Note: MPs from the Petrich Province who were elected on a single unopposed national unity list and formed the crossbench Macedonian Group, in order to represent the interests of the VMRO. The three MPs from Petrich represented the DA, the remaining five from Gorna Dzhumaya and Nevrokop were from the Socialist Federation Party.)	403,686	31.20	67	15	82
Workers' Party	167,281	12.93	6	25	31
Bulgarian Social Democratic Workers' Party (united)	27,323	2.11	0	5	5
Socialist Federation	26,501	2.05	5	0	5
BZNS (Tomov)–Craftsmen–Radical Democratic Party	20,805	1.61	0	0	0
United – Venelin Ganev	8,152	0.63	0	0	0
National Fellowship for Political Revival	6,654	0.51	0	0	0
Others	7,776	0.60	0	0	0
Total	1,293,731	100.00	229	45	274
Valid votes	1,293,731	98.34			
Invalid/blank votes	21,778	1.66			
Total votes	1,315,509	100.00			
Registered voters/turnout	1,543,847	85.21			
Source: National Statistical Institute (votes) Galunov (seats)

== Aftermath ==
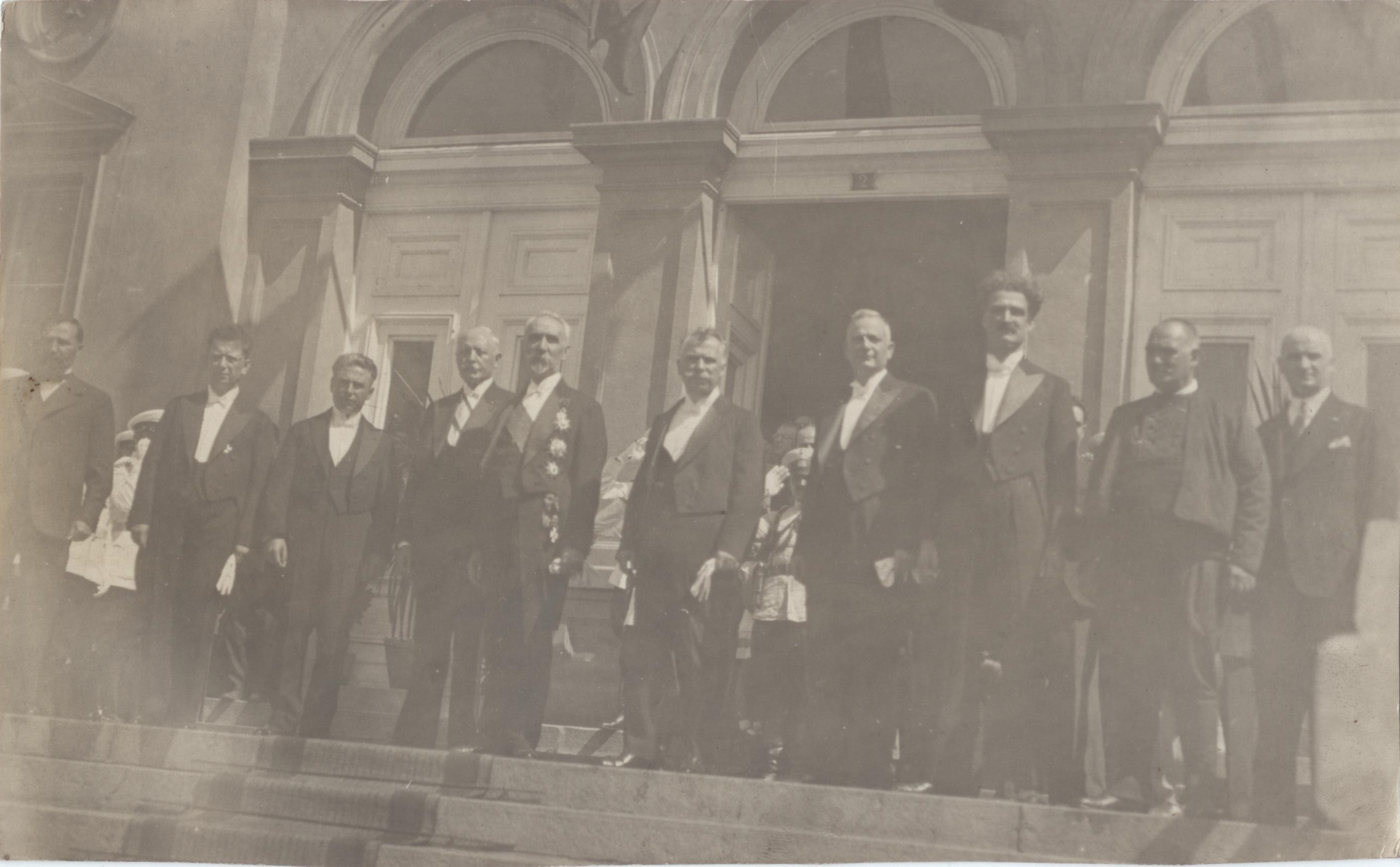
Malinov's fifth government

The People's Bloc formed a government, with the DP taking a leading role and its leader Aleksandar Malinov becoming Prime Minister, despite BZNS-Vrabcha 1 having won a plurality of the coalition's seats. The government sought to improve conditions during the economic crisis, however the coalition was unstable with a constant power struggle between the two large parties, as well as repeated fracturing in the smaller coalition partners (NLP and RP). Malinov resigned and became Chairman of Parliament in September 1931 and was succeeded as PM by Nikola Mushanov. Full freedom of speech and press and an amnesty for BZNS leaders was issued, however the authoritarian State Protection Act was kept in place and expanded. A protocol with Albania was signed in 1932, aimed at protecting ethnic minority populations and Bulgaria's war reparations payments were postponed later that year. The government sought to improve relations with Yugoslavia and France, in the hopes of reaching an agreement to take back Western Thrace from Greece, but these efforts came to an end after the formation of the Balkan Pact. Mushanov resigned on 15 May 1934, following another power struggle with BZNS-Vrabcha 1. During his three consecutive governments, the popularity of fascist and far-right movements grew significantly, notably the opposition NSD and groups like the Zveno, SBRZ and SBNL. The NSD had prepared a coup for 22 May 1934, but, having learned of their plans, the Zveno circle and the Bulgarian Military Union executed a coup on the 19th of May and Kimon Georgiev was appointed as PM.

Having overthrown the democratic government, the Zveno established an authoritarian regime and ruled through royal decree. Political parties were banned and the National Assembly was dissolved. Local autonomy and administration was completely overhauled, replaced by government appointed officials. The Main Information Directorate was formed as a propaganda tool and strong press censorship was put in place. A state controlled trade union was formed and all other unions were banned. Many state monopolies were formed and enterprises and banks were combined under state supervision, notably the Bulgarian Credit Bank and the Bulgarian Agrarian and Cooperative Bank. Additionally, Social security was established and the VMRO was banned. The government maintained a close relationship with Yugoslavia. There were strong republican tendencies in the Zveno and some believe their coup initially intended to also overthrow Tsar Boris III. By the autumn of 1934 a republican faction led by PM Georgiev and Damyan Velchev and a monarchist faction led by defense minister Pencho Zlatev had formed. In October Georgiev attempted to replace Zlatev with Velchev, but this was opposed by the leadership of the Bulgarian Military Union. Following a power struggle, Georgiev resigned in early 1935 and Zlatev succeeded him as PM. After a failed coup attempt by Velchev in 1935, the Military Union was dissolved and an army reform was implemented to ensure its support.

The new monarchist regime sought to centralize the authority of Boris III. In April 1935 Andrey Toshev a scientist close to the monarch, was appointed as PM. In November he was replaced by Foreign minister Georgi Kyoseivanov. Bulgaria began to increasingly rely on foreign trade, particularly with Nazi Germany. Having entrenched his powers, the monarch and his non-partisan regime approved a new electoral law in 1937 and scheduled elections for 1938.
