= 1938 Bulgarian parliamentary election =

- 6–27 March 1938
- All 160 seats in the National Assembly; 81 seats needed for a majority
- Turnout: 69.53%
Party	Leader	Seats
Government	Boris III	97
Democratic Unification	Angel Stankov (Note: Leader of the parliamentary group)	56
National Social Movement–Tsankov	Aleksandar Tsankov	3
Independent Agrarians	–	2
National Liberal Party (G. Petrov)	Georgi Petrov	1
People's Party	Atanas Burov	1
This lists parties that won seats. See the complete results below.
Prime Minister before	Prime Minister after
Georgi Kyoseivanov; Kyoseivanov II (Ind.) (Note: Includes non-partisan members of the NSD.)	Georgi Kyoseivanov; Kyoseivanov II (Ind.)

Parliamentary elections were held in Bulgaria to elect members of the XXIV Ordinary National Assembly between 6 and 27 March 1938, the first after the 1934 coup. The elections were held on a non-partisan basis, with all parties banned. Pro-government candidates won a majority of seats. Voter turnout was 70%. Women were allowed to vote – for the first time – if they were married, divorced or widowed.

Despite gerrymandering and manipulation, the opposition performed unexpectedly well. Following the election, three meetings were held in April 1938, one with 17 MPs from the regions of Burgas and Stara Zagora, one with 42 from Vratsa, Pleven and Shumen and one with 32 from Plovdiv and Sofia, with all of them expressing support for the government and a further six expressed support without being present, for a total of 97 pro-government MPs. Despite the non-partisan nature of the election, only ten elected MPs had never previously been members of any defunct parties.

== Electoral system ==
For the first time since the 1911 election MPs were elected under first-past-the-post, with 160 separate constituencies, some of them gerrymandered.

== Conduct ==
The elections were held on different dates in different regions to facilitate the presence of the armed forces for voter dispersion during the electoral campaign and exert pressure, make arrest and hinder the distribution of opposition ballots on election day.

== Results ==
Party or alliance		Votes	%	Seats
Government	Democratic Alliance–Moshanov			31
Government	Right-wing BZNS factions (Note: BZNS–Ploughman and BZNS–Peasant Voice)			30
Government	NSD–Kalfov			18
Government	Others			8
Government	Independents			10
Government	Total			97
Democratic Unification	Petorka (Note: BZNS–Vrabcha 1 27 seats, Bulgarian Social Democratic Workers' Party (Broad Socialists) 8, Radical Democratic Party 2, Democratic Alliance–Vasilev 2, National Liberal Party (Smilov) 2)			41
Democratic Unification	Bulgarian Communist Party			5
Democratic Unification	BZNS–Midday			9
Democratic Unification	Democratic Party			1
Democratic Unification	Total			56
National Social Movement–Tsankov				3
Independent Agrarians				2
National Liberal Party (G. Petrov)				1
People's Party (Note: The People's party was restored from the Burov faction of the Democratic Alliance, made up of formerly ONPP members)				1
Total				160
Total votes		2,261,862	–	
Registered voters/turnout		3,252,883	69.53	
Source: Nohlen & Stöver (votes), Georgiev (seats)

== Aftermath ==
The government achieved a closer majority than expected, and after the election successfully pressured a number of opposition MPs to change sides. Prime Minister Georgi Kyoseivanov continued his term. In July he signed the Salonika Agreement with the Balkan Pact, which removed the arms restrictions placed on Bulgaria. After the outbreak of World War II, Tsar Boris III dissolved the Assembly and scheduled elections for 1939.
