= November 1923 Bulgarian parliamentary election =

- 18 November 1923
- All 247 seats in the National Assembly; 124 seats needed for a majority
- Turnout: 86.21%
Party	Leader	Vote %	Seats	+/–
DA–BRSDP	Aleksandar Tsankov; Yanko Sakazov	63.76	200	+183
BZNS–BKP	Nikola Velev (Note: Due to many imprisonments and persecution, there was significant leadership instability in the BZNS. Nikola Velev was the leader of the October 1923 BZNS ruling committee, which was invalidated on 25 November, when the November committee approved and formalized the authority of the June committee led by the imprisoned Georgi Markov.); Dimitar Blagoev	22.10	38	−190
NLP-DA	Dimo Kyorchev	12.56	9	+9
This lists parties that won seats. See the complete results below.
Prime Minister before	Prime Minister after
Aleksandar Tsankov; Tsankov II (DA+BRSDP)	Aleksandar Tsankov; Tsankov II (DA+BRSDP)

Parliamentary elections were held in Bulgaria on 18 November 1923 to elect members of the XXI Ordinary National Assembly. The elections followed the 9 June coup. The result was a victory for the ruling Democratic Alliance, which won 200 of the 247 seats. Voter turnout was 86%.

== Results ==
Party	Votes	%	Seats
Democratic Alliance–BRSDP	639,881	63.76	200
Bulgarian Agrarian National Union	132,160	13.17	19
National Liberal Party	120,640	12.02	7
BZNS–BKP (Note: 11 BZNS, 8 BKP.)	81,180	8.09	19
Bulgarian Communist Party	8,437	0.84	0
National Liberal Party–DA Breakaways (Note: 1 seat for the NLP, 1 for DA)	5,371	0.54	2
National Liberal Party breakaways (Note: 713 votes for Genadiev's National Unity party.)	3,869	0.39	0
Craftsmen's Party	2,751	0.27	0
DA breakaways – United People's Progressive Party	1,843	0.18	0
DA breakaways – Democratic Party	1,420	0.14	0
Others	5,961	0.59	0
Total	1,003,513	100.00	247
Valid votes	1,003,513	91.52	
Invalid/blank votes	92,964	8.48	
Total votes	1,096,477	100.00	
Registered voters/turnout	1,271,890	86.21	
Source: National Statistical Institute

== Aftermath ==
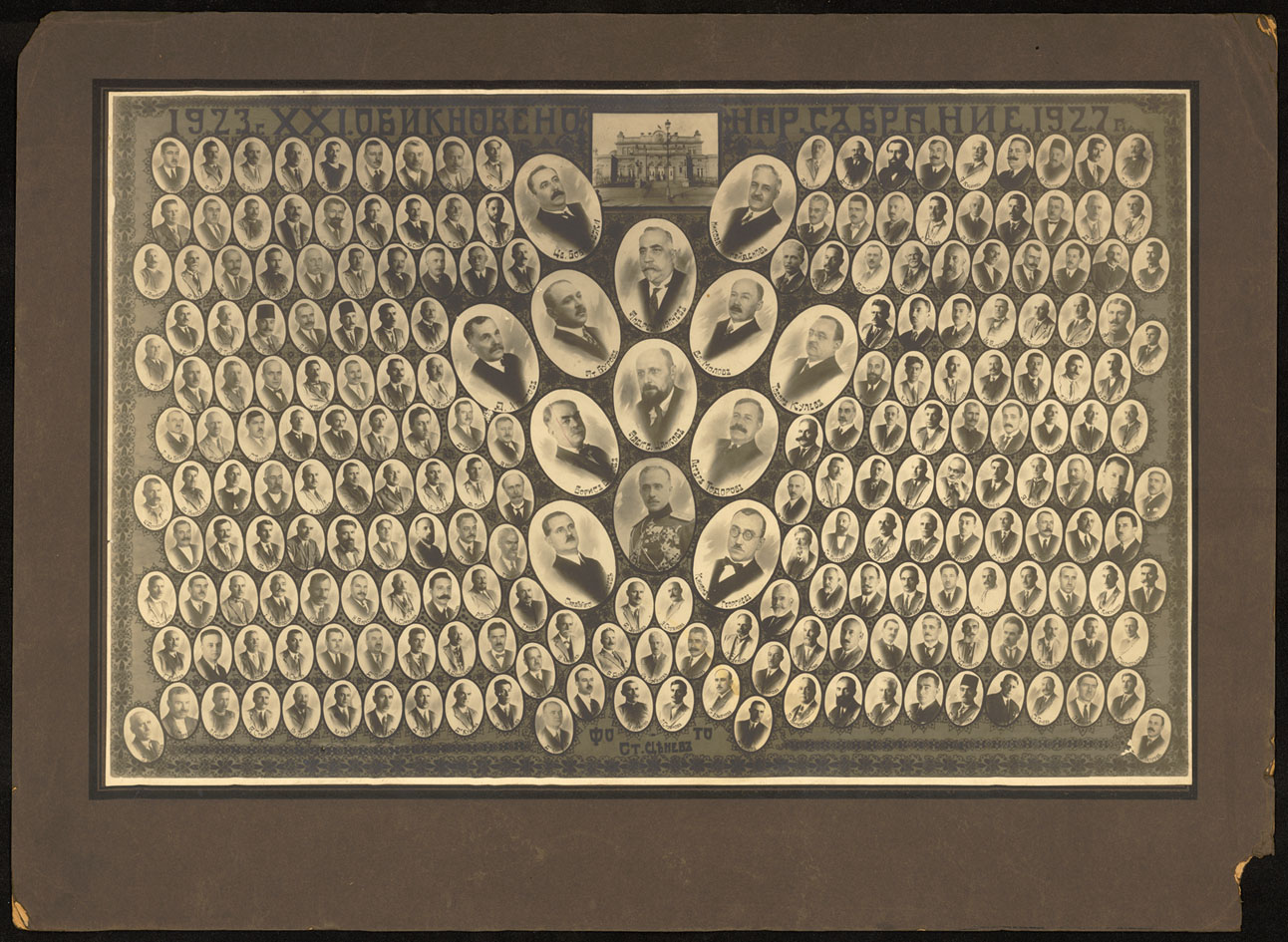
The government and the Parliamentary leadership at the dissolution of the XXI Assembly in April 1927
First row: Tsvetko Boboshevski, Nikola Naydenov
Second row: Dimitar Hristov, Atanas Burov, Andrey Lyapchev, Vladimir Mollov, Todor Kulev
Third row (parliamentary leadership): Boris Vazov, Aleksandar Tsankov, Petar Todorov
Fourth row: Slaveyko Vasilev, Ivan Valkov, Kimon Georgiev

The ruling coalition won a majority and Aleksandar Tsankov remained Prime Minister. In February 1924 the Broad Socialists left the government, although a faction led by minister Kazasov opposed the decision and later founded the Socialist Federation party. In early 1924 large factions of the former Democratic and Radical parties which had merged into the DA broke away to re-establish their parties.

In early 1924 the government rolled back many reforms implemented by the Agrarians and approved the authoritarian State Protection Act. Despite reaffirming the Neuilly and Niš agreements, the government had a tense relationship with neighbouring Yugoslavia and Greece. Following the Tarlis incident in July, the Politis–Kalfov Protocol was signed, however the Greek Parliament didn't ratify it. In 1925 the Petrich incident took place, which saw Greek troops enter Bulgaria until an intervention from the League of Nations. Following the 1925 St. Nedelya Church bombing, the State Protection Act was amended and expanded to allow death sentences for those "responsible for dangerous acts and those who assisted them", many opposition leaders were imprisoned and killed. These harsh measures and international isolation resulted in the moderate wing of the remaining DA taking a leading role in the party and forcing Tsankov's resignation. He became Chairman of Parliament and Andrey Lyapchev succeeded him as Prime Minister. Because of the authoritarian measures, close relationship with Fascist Italy and Tsankov later founding the nazi-inspired National Social Movement, he and his governments have often being characterized as fascist.

Lyapchev's government restored freedom of speech and press and issued an amnesty for many political prisoners. During its term the first post-war foreign loan (the Refugee Loan) was taken in order to improve conditions for Bulgarian refugees who had settled in the country after World War I.
