= Bulgarian parliamentary election, 1923 =

The term Bulgarian parliamentary election, 1923 may refer to:

- Bulgarian parliamentary election, April 1923
- Bulgarian parliamentary election, November 1923
