= Orange Guard =

Bulgarian paramilitary organization

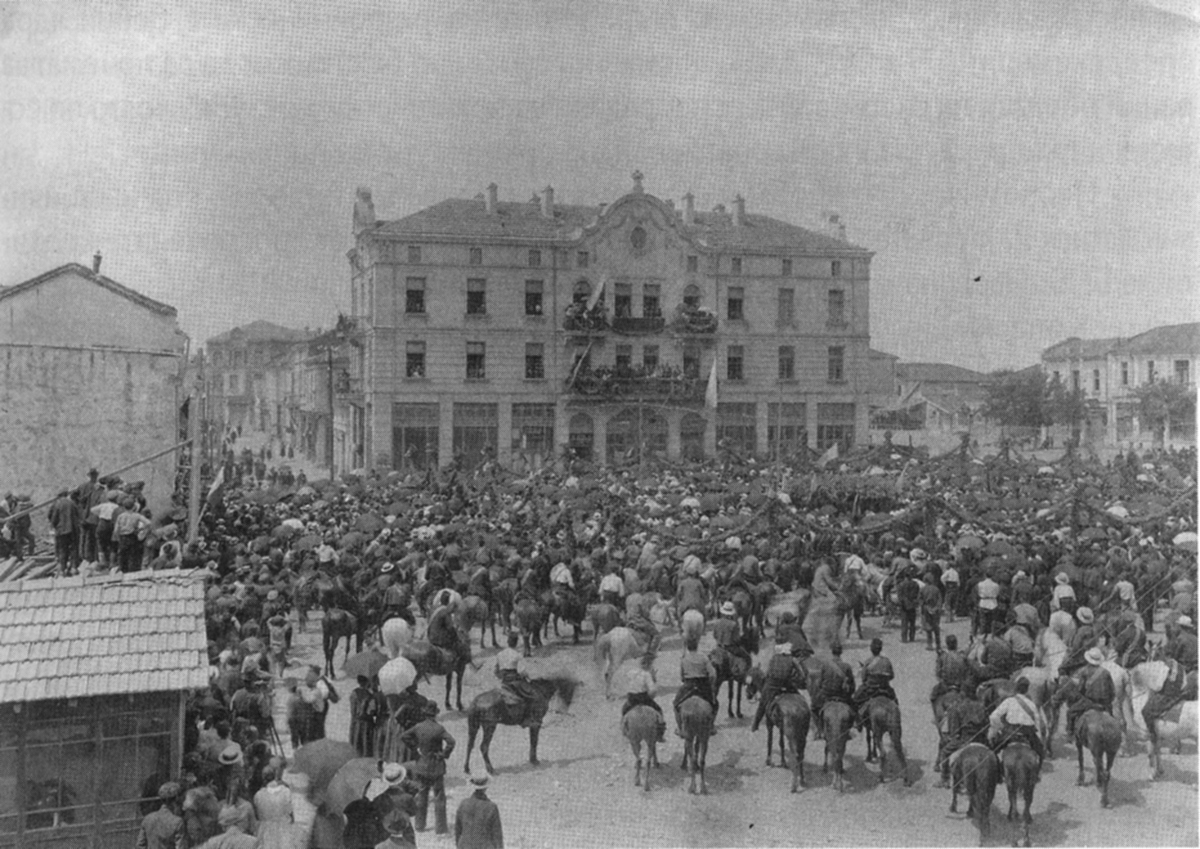
An Orange Guard rally in Haskovo.

The Agrarian National Guard (Земеделска народна гвардия, Zemedelska narodna gvardiya), unofficially known as the Orange Guard (Bulgarian: Оранжева гвардия, Oranzheva gvardiya) was a Bulgarian paramilitary organization created by the Bulgarian Agrarian National Union (BANU). It operated during the premiership of the Agrarian politician Aleksandar Stamboliyski, who served as Prime Minister of Bulgaria from 1919 to 1923. The Guard not only functioned as Stamboliyski's bodyguard, but also carried out the government's radical land-reform policies. The militia earned its unofficial name, the Orange Guard, from the opposition – in reference to BANU's official color. It was divided in two parts – infantry and cavalry.

The radical left-wing politician and one-time leader of the Radomir Rebellion of 1918, Rayko Daskalov (who held several ministerial posts in the BANU government), personally commanded the Orange Guard, having suggested its formation.

The militia became involved in a number of violent confrontations with the political opposition, such as quelling the large transport strike of 1919-1920 (organized by Communists, Anarchists and Socialists) and attacking the founding convention of the right-wing Constitutional Bloc in 1922. It also clashed with the Internal Macedonian Revolutionary Organization (IMRO). After Benito Mussolini staged his March on Rome in October 1922, the National Alliance (a military-academic opposition group) considered launching a "March on Sofia", but abandoned the idea out of fear of Orange Guard retaliation.

When the Bulgarian coup d'état of 1923 (led by the military and a coalition of right-wing parties, in cooperation with the IMRO) ousted the Agrarian government on 9 June 1923, most of the Orange Guard was concentrated in the capital of Sofia. The attack came as a surprise to the peasant militiamen, who were quickly disarmed. The new Democratic Alliance government of Aleksandar Tsankov later dissolved the organization. On orders of the IMRO leader Todor Aleksandrov, an IMRO agent assassinated Rayko Daskalov, the Orange Guard commander, on August 23, 1923 in Prague (where he had formed a BANU government in exile).

== See also ==
- Black Army
- Green Armies
- Red Guards
- September Uprising
- Uprising of Ivaylo
