= 1927 Bulgarian parliamentary election =

- 29 May 1927
- All 273 seats in the National Assembly; 137 seats needed for a majority
- Turnout: 84.27%
Party	Leader	Vote %	Seats	+/–
DA–PLP	Andrey Lyapchev; Dobri Petkov	45.27	174	−26
Iron Bloc	Georgi Markov; Yanko Sakazov; Vasil Kolarov	27.29	61	+23
Triple Coalition	Aleksandar Malinov; Dimo Kyorchev; Konstantin Tomov	16.63	26	+17
VMRO	Ivan Karandzhulov (Note: Leader of the parliamentary group)	3.28	11	New
NLP (united)	Boyan Smilov	1.61	1	New
This lists parties that won seats. See the complete results below.
Prime Minister before	Prime Minister after
Andrey Lyapchev; Lyapchev I (DA)	Andrey Lyapchev; Lyapchev I (DA)

Parliamentary elections were held in Bulgaria on 29 May 1927 to elect members of the XXII Ordinary National Assembly. The result was a victory for the ruling Democratic Alliance, which ran alongside the restored People's Liberal Party. The coalition won 174 of the 273 seats. Voter turnout was 84.3%.

== Results ==
Party or alliance		Votes	%	Seats
DA–PLP (Note: 414,591 votes in constituencies where the DA ran alone, 108,001 in constituencies where they ran with the PLP.)	Democratic Alliance	522,592	45.27	168
DA–PLP	People's Liberal Party (Note: The People's Liberal (Stambolovist) Party was briefly restored from the Petkov faction of the National Liberal Party. In September 1928 it merged back into the Kyorchev-led NLP)	522,592	45.27	6
Iron Bloc of Labour (Note: In some constituencies, the coalition included members of the Workers' Party. The coalition collapsed shortly after the election)	BZNS-Vrabcha 1	285,758	24.76	43
Iron Bloc of Labour	BRSDP (united)	285,758	24.76	10
Iron Bloc of Labour	Craftsmen	285,758	24.76	4
Iron Bloc of Labour	Workers' Party (Note: As the Communist party was de jure banned, its members ran on the lists of the newly founded Workers' Party. The two eventually merged.)	285,758	24.76	2
Triple Coalition (Note: The coalition was variously referred to as quadruple or quintuple, depending on the number of parties it included in each constituency. The coalition collapsed shortly after the election)	Democratic Party	179,491	15.55	11
Triple Coalition	National Liberal Party	179,491	15.55	9
Triple Coalition	BZNS-Orange	179,491	15.55	3
Triple Coalition	Radical Party	179,491	15.55	2
Internal Macedonian Revolutionary Organization (Note: All the MPs in the Petrich Province were elected on a single unopposed national unity list and formed the crossbench Macedonian Group, in order to represent the interests of the VMRO. The four MPs from Gorna Dzhumaya represented the DP, the four from Petrich the RP and the three from Nevrokop - the DA)		37,854	3.28	11
RP–BZNS-Stara Zagora	Radical Party	29,637	2.57	0
RP–BZNS-Stara Zagora	BZNS-Stara Zagora	29,637	2.57	0
Workers' Party		29,210	2.53	2
National Liberal Party (united)		18,540	1.61	1
United People's Progressive Party		17,249	1.49	0
Democratic Party		12,414	1.08	1
Others		21,568	1.87	0
Total		1,154,313	100.00	273
Valid votes		1,154,313	97.57	
Invalid/blank votes		28,809	2.43	
Total votes		1,183,122	100.00	
Registered voters/turnout		1,403,972	84.27	
Source: National Statistical Institute (votes), DA newspaper, issue 1081 (seats) (Note: The seat distribution for the Vratsa Province does not entirely match the final vote count for each municipality and may reflect preliminary results)

== Aftermath ==
The ruling Democratic Alliance won a majority by itself and Andrey Lyapchev remained Prime Minister. In May 1931 a faction of the NLP joined the government with two ministers.

In 1927 the government signed the Mollov–Kafandaris agreement, which regulated the real estate assets left behind by Bulgarians expelled from Greece and Greeks from Bulgaria after the First World War. In the aftermath of the 1928 earthquakes, the government secured a foreign loan, which, alongside the Refugee Loan two years prior, helped stabilize the Bulgarian lev. The period between 1928 and 1931 was characterized by the increasing influence of tsar Boris III and growing ties to Fascist Italy, culminating in Boris' marriage to Giovanna of Savoy. Bulgaria under Lyapchev, a Macedonian Bulgarian, had a tense relationship with neighboring Yugoslavia and the border between the two countries was closed in 1929. The Great Depression in Bulgaria, usually seen as being ushered in by the bankruptcy of the Buklovi Brothers enterprise in October 1929, had a strong effect on Bulgaria's mostly agricultural and light industry dominated economy. Production fell by over 30% in the first three years of the crisis, resulting in mass unemployment.
