= People's Bloc (Bulgaria) =

The People's Bloc (Bulgarian: Народен блок, romanized: Naroden Blok) was the ruling coalition of Bulgaria between 29 June 1931 and 19 May 1934.

== Background ==
During its time outside government, the Democratic Party under the leadership of Aleksandar Malinov (1903–1934) led and took part in several opposition coalitions.

== History ==
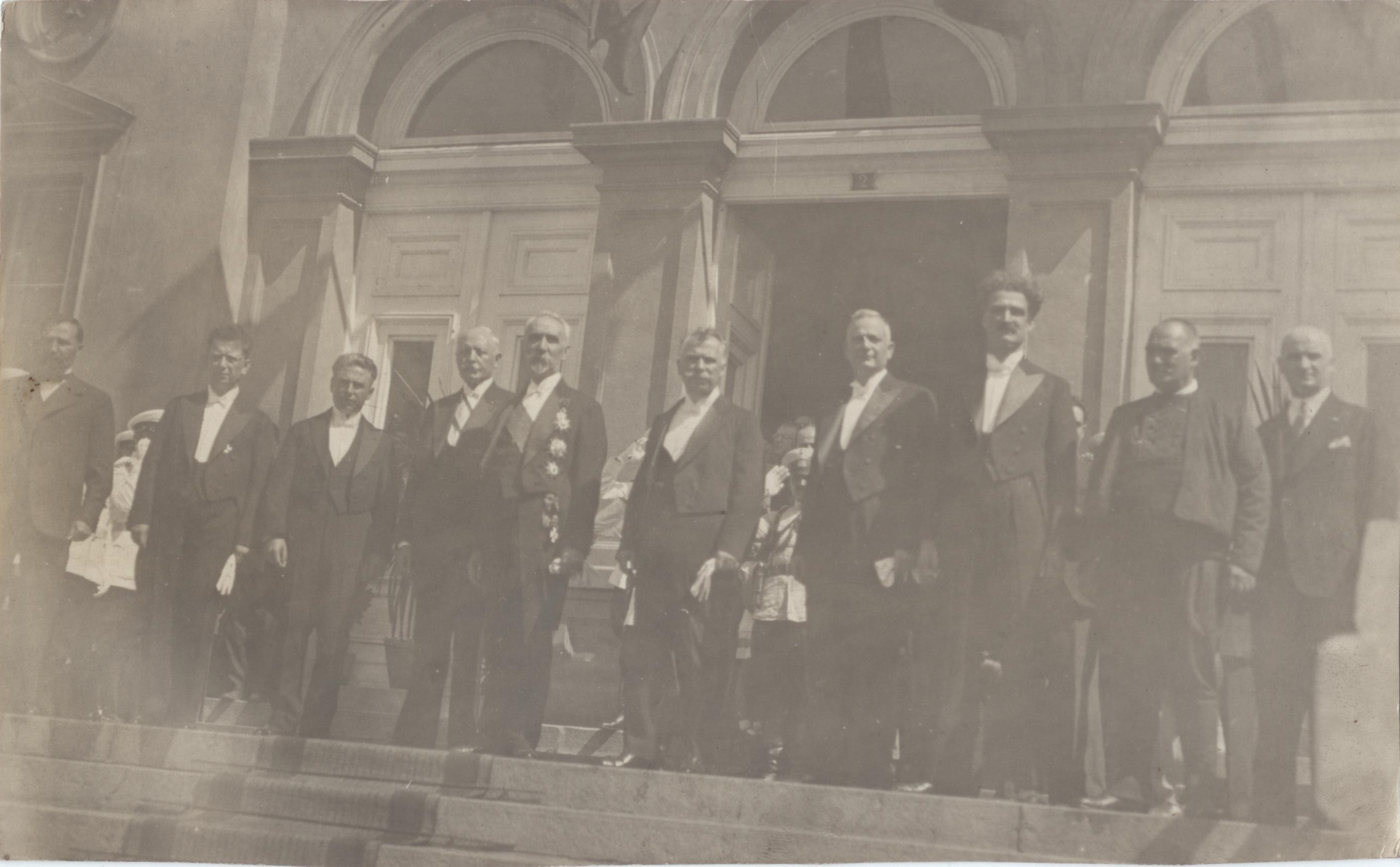
The first government of the People's Bloc with Malinov as PM (June-Sept 1931)

The coalition, consisting of the Democrats, Radicals, the Petrov faction of the NLP and BZNS-Vrabcha 1, was founded shortly before the 1931 election, which they won. The democrats took several important positions (the Foreign, Interior and Finance ministries, as well as the positions of Chairman of Parliament and Prime Minister), despite the fact that BZNS-Vrabcha had won a plurality of the coalition's seats. Many of the coalition's parties suffered internal splits and there was a constant power struggle between the democrats and agrarians. The ongoing Great Depression was only partly alleviated. The Bloc governments are generally regarded as unstable, unsuccessful and partly responsible for the fall of the country to authoritarianism with the 19 May coup.
