= April 1923 Bulgarian parliamentary election =

- 22 April 1923
- All 245 seats in the National Assembly; 123 seats needed for a majority
- Turnout: 86.48%
Party	Leader	Vote %	Seats	+/–
BZNS	Aleksandar Stamboliyski	53.77	212	+102
CB-BRSDP (o)	Aleksandar Malinov; Ivan Geshov; Yanko Sakazov	21.40	17	−33
BKP	Dimitar Blagoev	19.27	16	−34
This lists parties that won seats. See the complete results below.
Prime Minister before	Prime Minister after
Aleksandar Stamboliyski; Stamboliyski I (BZNS)	Aleksandar Stamboliyski; Stamboliyski II (BZNS)

Parliamentary elections were held in Bulgaria on 22 April 1923. to elect members of the XX Ordinary National Assembly. The result was a victory for the ruling Bulgarian Agrarian National Union, which won 212 of the 245 seats. Voter turnout was 86%.

== Results ==
Party or alliance		Votes	%	Seats	+/–
Bulgarian Agrarian National Union		569,139	53.77	212	+102
Bulgarian Communist Party		203,972	19.27	16	–34
Constitutional Bloc (Note: Democratic Party - 8 seats, United People's Progressive Party - 4 seats, Radical Democratic Party - 2 seats, BRSDP (united) - 2 seats, Independent - 1 seat)	Constitutional Bloc	166,909	15.77	14	–40
Constitutional Bloc	Constitutional Bloc–BRSDP (united)	31,768	3.00	3	–6
National Liberal Party		55,963	5.29	0	–6
BRSDP (united)		27,816	2.63	0	–
Other BZNS groups		2,768	0.26	0	0
Others		141	0.01	0	0
Total		1,058,476	100.00	245	+16
Valid votes		1,058,476	98.10		
Invalid/blank votes		20,532	1.90		
Total votes		1,079,008	100.00		
Registered voters/turnout		1,247,720	86.48		
Source: National Statistical Institute

== Aftermath ==
Following the election, much of the opposition became involved in the organization of a coup. Interior minister Hristo Stoyanov had called 5000 Orange Guards to Sofia in response, however early in the morning on 9 June 1923 the government was overthrown.

The People's Alliance, which had organized the coup alongside the Bulgarian Military Union, formed a government with the parties of the opposition Constitutional Bloc (ONPP, DP and RDP) as well as the NLP and the Broad Socialists. NLP's sole minister, Boyan Smilov, was later forced to resign under Socialist pressure. In the months that followed, BZNS leader Aleksandar Stamboliyski was murdered, many other BZNS members were imprisoned and the anti-government June Uprising and September Uprising took place. The People's Alliance, ONPP, DP and RDP merged into the Democratic Alliance on 10 August and snap elections were scheduled for November.
