= People's Alliance (Bulgaria) =

1921–1923 political party in Bulgaria

People's Alliance Народен сговор Naroden Sgovor
- Leader: Aleksandar Grekov; Aleksandar Tsankov; Mitko Halvadzhiev
- Founded: 14 October 1921
- Dissolved: 1923
- Merged into: Democratic Alliance
- Ideology: Nationalism; Anti-communism
- Political position: Right-wing

The People's Alliance (Bulgarian: Народен сговор) was a Bulgarian party created on 14 October 1921 by a group of non-partisan university teachers. Among its founders were Aleksandar Grekov, Aleksandar Tsankov, Petko Staynov, Dimitar Mishaykov and others.

The purpose of the People's Alliance was to stop the growing influence of the leftists and the authoritarian rule of the Bulgarian Agrarian People's Union. After the government of Aleksandar Stamboliyski eliminated the leaders of the opposition Constitutional Bloc in the end of 1922 and the fraud of the 1923 elections, the leaders of the People's Alliance allied with the Military Union and the Internal Macedonian Revolutionary Organization which was decisive for the 9 June coup d'état. After the coup the People's Alliance entered in the newly formed party Democratic Alliance.

The People's Alliance was sometimes called by its opponents the "Black Bloc" or the "Black Blood Bloc".

== Leaders ==
- 1921–1922: Aleksandar Grekov
- 1922–1923: Aleksandar Tsankov
- 1924–1925: Mitko Halvadzhiev
