= 1939 Bulgarian parliamentary election =

- 24 December 1939–January 1940
- All 160 seats in the National Assembly; 81 seats needed for a majority
- Turnout: 67.2%
Party	Leader	Vote %	Seats
Government	Boris III	57.74	140
BKP	Vasil Kolarov	8.04	10
BZNS-Midday	Konstantin Tomov	7.09	5
NSD-Tsankov (Note: While officially in opposition, the two NSD MPs often voted with the governing bloc and are sometimes listed as pro-government.)	Aleksandar Tsankov	3.25	2
BZNS-Vrabcha 1	Dimitar Gichev	5.94	1
Democratic Party	Nikola Mushanov	1.83	1
Zveno/NP	Kimon Georgiev	1.78	1
This lists parties that won seats. See the complete results below.
Prime Minister before	Prime Minister after
Georgi Kyoseivanov; Kyoseivanov IV (Ind.)	Bogdan Filov; Filov I (Ind.)

Parliamentary elections were held in Bulgaria to elect members of the XXV Ordinary National Assembly on 24 December 1939, although voting continued in some areas into January 1940. The elections were officially held on a non-partisan basis with the Bulgarian Agrarian National Union and Bulgarian Communist Party banned, and in a process tightly controlled by Tsar Boris III, by then the real power in the country. However, candidates representing parties did contest the elections. Pro-government candidates won a majority of seats. Voter turnout was 67.2%.

== Results ==
Party	Votes	%	Seats
Pro-government candidates	1,222,971	57.74	140
Bulgarian Communist Party	170,252	8.04	10
Bulgarian Agrarian National Union (Tomov)	150,251	7.09	5
Bulgarian Agrarian National Union (Dragiev)	125,713	5.94	1
Agrarians	94,354	4.45	0
National Social Movement	68,815	3.25	2
Democratic Alliance	59,740	2.82	0
National Liberal Party	46,766	2.21	0
Democratic Party	38,863	1.83	1
Zveno	37,706	1.78	1
Bulgarian Social Democratic Workers' Party (Broad Socialists)	26,672	1.26	0
Radical Democratic Party	18,939	0.89	0
Internal Macedonian Revolutionary Organization	14,593	0.69	0
Other opposition candidates	42,351	2.00	0
Total	2,117,986	100.00	160
Valid votes	2,117,986	97.37	
Invalid/blank votes	57,177	2.63	
Total votes	2,175,163	100.00	
Registered voters/turnout	3,235,968	67.22	
Source: Nohlen & Stöver, Kandilarov Dimitrov

== Aftermath ==
Bogdan Filov was appointed as Prime Minister after the election. The government signed the anti-Jewish Law for Protection of the Nation, the Mobilization Directorate and the pro-fascist Brannik youth organization were formed. In 1940 the Treaty of Craiova was signed, returning control of Southern Dobruja to Bulgaria. The country joined the Tripartite Pact and World War II on 1 March 1941, with a 140 to 20 vote in the Assembly. Boris III died on 28 August 1943 and a regency for his son Simeon II was established. Filov became a regent and was succeeded as PM by Dobri Bozhilov and later by Ivan Bagryanov. As soviet troops were about to enter the country, the regency allowed the formation of a government of the pro-Allied democratic opposition under Konstantin Muraviev, however it was overthrown by the Fatherland Front seven days later in the 9 September coup.

127 of the 160 MPs in the XXV National Assembly were tried in the People's Court, (111 were present, 7 tried in absentia and 9 had died), with 67 sentenced to death, in addition to the three regents (Filov, Prince Kiril and Nikola Mihov) and the Prime Ministers Bozhilov and Bagryanov, amongst others.

== Sources ==
- Miller, Marshall Lee (1975). Bulgaria during the Second World War. Stanford, CA: Stanford University Press.
