= Ivan Valkov =

Bulgarian general (1875–1962)

- Иван Вълков
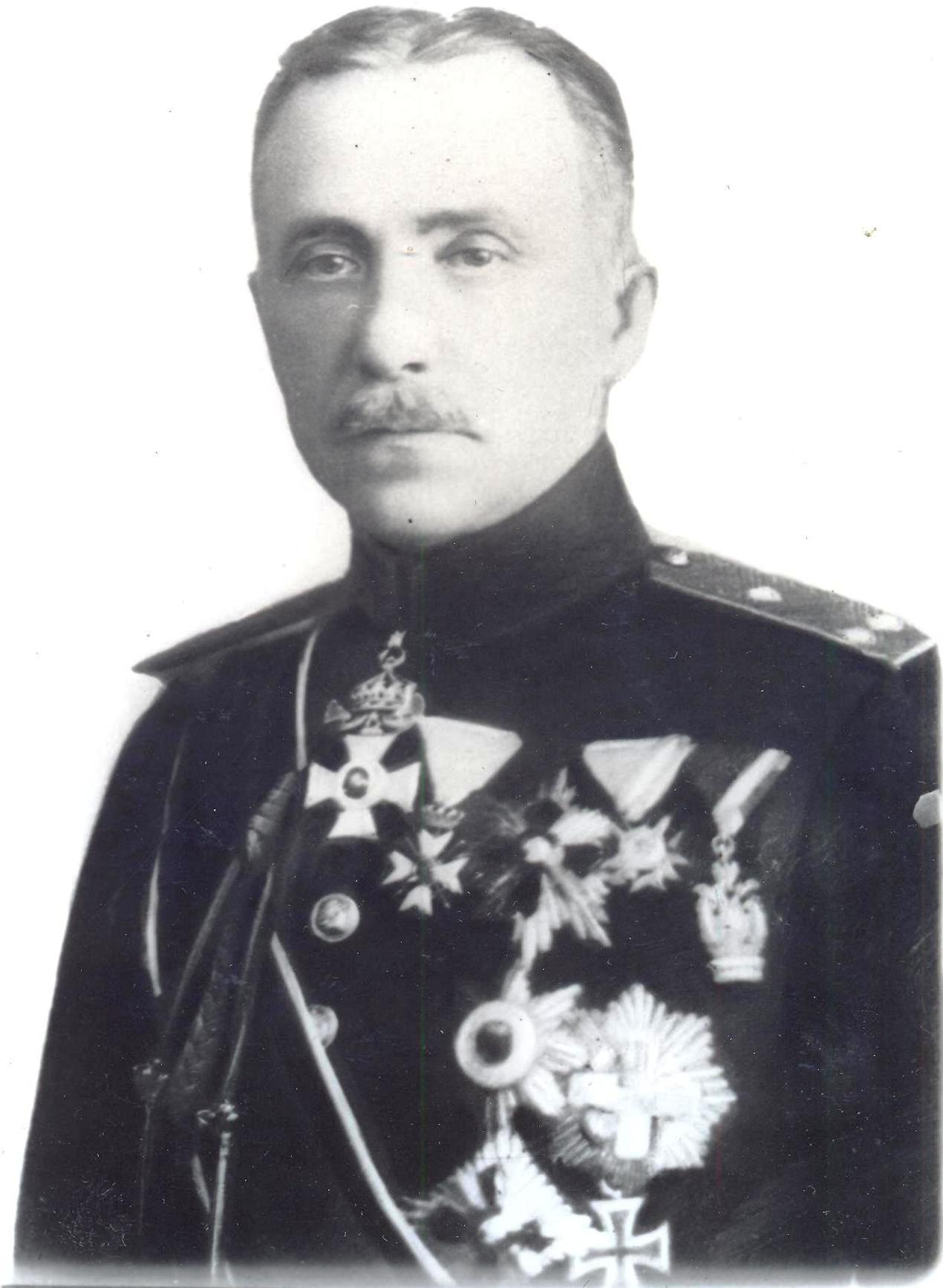

Minister of War
- In office 10 June 1923 – 11 January 1929
- Monarch: Boris III of Bulgaria
- Preceded by: Aleksandar Tsankov
- Succeeded by: Nikola Bakardzhiev

Bulgarian Ambassador to Italy
- In office 1929–1934

Personal details
- Born: Ivan Valkov; January 31, 1875 Kazanlak, Ottoman Empire (modern Bulgaria)
- Died: April 20, 1962 (aged 87) Stara Zagora, People's Republic of Bulgaria
- Party: Military Union
- Education: Sofia Military School (1896); Nikolayev Academy of General Staff (1909)

Military service
- Allegiance: Kingdom of Bulgaria
- Branch/service: Bulgarian Land Forces
- Years of service: 1896–1929
- Rank: General of Infantry
- Commands: 44th Infantry Regiment
- Battles/wars: Balkan Wars; World War I

Ivan Valkov (Bulgarian: Иван Вълков; 31 January 1875, in Kazanlak, Ottoman Empire – 20 April 1962, in Stara Zagora, Bulgaria) was a Bulgarian General of Infantry who fought in World War I and later held the post of Minister of War (1923–1929).

== Early life ==
Ivan Valkov was born in Kazanlak, in what was the Ottoman Empire at the time, where he finished school. He later graduated from the Sofia Military School (1896), and later the Nikolayev Academy of General Staff (1909) in St. Petersburg, Russia. Valkov also graduated from an artillery academy and at the beginning of the 20th century was the only Bulgarian army officer who attended two higher education institutions.

== Military career ==
- 1896—1906: Staff officer in the 6th Artillery Regiment.
- 1911: Military school instructor.
- 1912—1913: During the Balkan Wars, served on the 2nd Army staff, and chief of staff of the eastern sector of the siege of Odrin.
- 1913—1915: Military school instructor.
- 1915—1916: With Bulgaria's entry into World War I, chief of the operations department of the 2nd Army staff.
- From 1916: Commander of the 44th Infantry Regiment.
- 1917—1918: Chief of staff of the 7th and later 10th Infantry Divisions.
- 1919—1923: Director of the Cartographic Institute.
- From 1919: Military academy professor, taught geography at Sofia University.
- 1922—1928: At the same time, editor of the "Yearbook of the Geographic Institute of the Ministry of War."

== Bulgarian War Minister ==
In 1919 he was one of the founders, and in 1920—1928 was the chairman of the Military Union, an officers' organization. As its head, Valkov took part in the Bulgarian coup d'état of 9 June 1923, in which they overthrew Prime Minister Aleksandar Stamboliyski. From 10 June 1923 until 11 January 1929, Valkov was the Minister of War in the governments of prime ministers Aleksandar Tsankov and Andrey Lyapchev. He oversaw the repression of leftist organizations after the September Rebellion in 1923 and the assassination attempt on Tsar Boris III of Bulgaria two years later. Valkov was also one of the founders of a military factor in Kazanlak.

In October 1925, at the time of the Greco-Bulgarian conflict in the Petrich district, General Valkov used diplomatic rather than military means to restore the status-quo. He gave the order to not open fire and appealed to the League of Nations for support. As a result, Greece was recognized as the aggressor and was forced to pay Bulgaria compensation for casualties and damage. The results of the conflict are regarded as a success of Bulgarian diplomacy.

In the second half of the 1920s, Valkov was accused of backing Ivan Mihailov and his faction of the internal conflict within the Internal Macedonian Revolutionary Organization. His actions were criticized by former Prime Minister Aleksandar Tsankov and the Minister of Foreign Affairs, Atanas Burov, but Valkov received support from Boris III at the time. It was because of this that the general remained in the government.

In 1928 Valkov declared the dissolution of the Military Union due to it being divided as a result of internal bickering and political differences. At a time when negotiations were underway regarding Bulgaria's representation in international organizations, the government demanded the Valkov resign because of his reputation of being an opponent of democracy. Prime Minister Lyapchev agreed to this, and Valkov was removed from his post as war minister.

== Later career ==
In 1929–1934, he was the plenipotentiary minister of Bulgaria in Italy. Valkov played a key role at this time during negotiations to conclude a marriage between Boris III and the Princess Giovanna of Italy, daughter of King Victor Emmanuel III. From 19 May 1934, he remained in the army reserve and was no longer involved in political activities. In 1943 Valkov became the editor of the publication "Bulgarian Military Idea."

After pro-Soviet and communist forces rose to power as a result of the Bulgarian coup d'état of 1944, he was arrested on 17 June 1946. He remained in prison for years before being sentenced to death in 1954 for his use of terror against the far left opposition in April 1925. However, Valkov's sentence was changed to 20 years in prison due to his old age (life imprisonment, according to other sources). He died in prison in 1962.

== Rank history ==
Promotions
Rank	Date
General of Infantry	15 May 1928
Lieutenant General	26 March 1925
Major General	12 August 1923
Colonel	15 August 1917
Lieutenant Colonel	18 May 1915
Major	18 May 1911
Captain	1 January 1905
Ensign	1 January 1900
Junior Ensign	1 January 1896

== Awards ==
Kingdom of Bulgaria

Order of Bravery (2nd class)
Order of Saint Alexander (3rd and 4th class with swords, 1st class)
Order of Military Merit (1st and 2nd class)

Russian Empire

Order of Saint Stanislaus (3rd class)

German Empire

Iron Cross (1st and 2nd class)

Austria-Hungary

Order of the Iron Crown (3rd class)
Cross for Military Merit (3rd class)

Turkey

Order of the Iron Crescent

Political offices
Preceded by Aleksandar Tsankov	Minister of War of Bulgaria; 10 June 1923 – 19 January 1929	Succeeded by Nikola Bakardzhiev
