= 1901 Bulgarian parliamentary election =

Bulgarian parliamentary election

- 28 January 1901
- All 167 seats in the National Assembly; 84 seats needed for a majority
- Turnout: 42.74%
Party	Leader	Vote %	Seats	+/–
People's Party	Konstantin Stoilov	18.75	25	+23
People's Liberal	Dimitar Grekov	18.40	31	+12
Progressive Liberal	Stoyan Danev	16.49	31	+21
Democratic	Petko Karavelov	13.75	27	+17
BZNS	Yanko Zabunov	6.33	13	New
LP (Radoslavists)	Vasil Radoslavov	4.23	5	−84
BRSDP	Yanko Sakazov; Dimitar Blagoev	4.11	2	−2
Reformist Party		1.70	5	New
Ind. Democrats		1.33	2	New
Conservatives		0.99	2	+1
Independents	–	11.30	24	+19
This lists parties that won seats. See the complete results below.
Prime Minister before	Prime Minister after
Racho Petrov; Petrov I (Ind.)	Petko Karavelov; Karavelov IV (DP+PLP)

Parliamentary elections were held in Bulgaria on 28 January 1901 to elect members of the XI Ordinary National Assembly. Although the People's Party received the most votes, the People's Liberal Party and the Progressive Liberal Party jointly won the most seats. Voter turnout was 43%.

== Results ==
Party	Votes (Note: Listed is the number of votes received for each party, not the number of individual voters. As most of the 81 constituencies elected more than one MP, most voters cast more than one vote. The number of individual voters was 344 787)	%	Seats	+/–
People's Party	149,276	18.75	25	+23
People's Liberal Party	146,532	18.40	31	+12
Progressive Liberal Party	131,301	16.49	31	+21
Democratic Party	109,471	13.75	27	+17
Bulgarian Agrarian National Union	50,428	6.33	13	+13
Liberal Party	33,718	4.23	5	–84
Bulgarian Workers' Social Democratic Party	32,737	4.11	2	–2
Undetermined	15,310	1.92	0	–
Reformist Party	13,508	1.70	5	+5
Independent Democrats	10,587	1.33	2	+2
Conservative Party	7,861	0.99	2	+1
Independent Liberals	4,417	0.55	0	–
Independent PLP	973	0.12	0	–
Monarchist-Constitutionalists	135	0.02	0	–
Independents	89,944	11.30	24	+19
Total	796,198	100.00	167	–2
Valid votes	292,911	84.95		
Invalid/blank votes	51,876	15.05		
Total votes	344,787	100.00		
Registered voters/turnout	806,679	42.74		
Source: National Statistical Institute, Nohlen & Stöver

=== By-elections ===
Several MPs were elected in more than one constituency and were required to choose which one to represent when the Assembly convened, resulting in nine seats being vacated. Two MPs died, two resigned their seats to hold national office and the results in seventeen seats were annulled, resulting in 30 vacancies across 20 constituencies. Snap elections were held on 8 April and 7 October 1901. This resulted in the Progressive Liberal Party becoming the largest party with 40 seats.

Party	Seats
Progressive Liberal Party	40
People's Party	29
Democratic Party	27
People's Liberal Party	24
Independents	19
Bulgarian Agrarian National Union	12
Liberal Party	5
Conservative Party	2
Bulgarian Workers' Social Democratic Party	2
Independent Democrats	2
Reformist Party	1
Democratic-Republican	1
Total	164
Source: National Statistical Institute

== Aftermath ==
Following the election, Petko Karavelov became Prime Minister, leading a government of the DP and the PLP, supported by the NP. These were Bulgaria's three major traditional pro-Russian parties. The government granted an amnesty to many of those involved in the 1900 riots and introduced democratization reforms, including greater press freedom and increased Parliamentary oversight of ministers. However voting rights were taken away from Bulgaria's Muslim and Roma populations, a policy that would remain until the 1914 election. The ongoing financial crisis in the country continued to worsen and Karavelov resigned in December 1901, after Parliament narrowly rejected a proposed French loan by the Paribas bank by four votes, with the deciding votes coming from former Democrats in the new Young Democrats Party. PLP leader and Foreign minister Stoyan Danev was appointed PM and lead a minority government heading into the subsequent 1902 election.
