= 1920 Bulgarian parliamentary election =

- 28 March 1920
- All 229 seats in the National Assembly; 115 seats needed for a majority
- Turnout: 77.26%
Party	Leader	Vote %	Seats	+/–
BZNS	Aleksandar Stamboliyski	38.56	110	+33
Communist	Dimitar Blagoev	20.39	50	+3
Democratic	Aleksandar Malinov	10.07	24	−4
People's	Ivan Evstratiev Geshov	6.81	14	−5
BRSDP (united)	Yanko Sakazov	6.12	9	−29
PLP	Stoyan Danev	5.13	8	0
RDP	Stoyan Kustorkov	4.63	8	0
PLP–Genadiev	Nikola Genadiev	2.96	2	+1
PLP–Petkov	Dobri Petkov	0.86	4	+2
This lists parties that won seats. See the complete results below.
Prime Minister before	Prime Minister after
Aleksandar Stamboliyski; Stamboliyski I (BZNS)	Aleksandar Stamboliyski; Stamboliyski I (BZNS)

Parliamentary elections were held in Bulgaria on 28 March 1920 to elect members of the XIX Ordinary National Assembly. It was compulsory to vote. The result was a victory for the ruling Bulgarian Agrarian National Union (BZNS), which won 110 of the 229 seats. Voter turnout was 77%.

== Results ==
Party	Votes	%	Seats
Bulgarian Agrarian National Union	349,212	38.56	110
Bulgarian Communist Party	184,616	20.39	50
Democratic Party	91,177	10.07	23
People's Party	61,647	6.81	12
BRSDP (united)	55,452	6.12	9
Progressive Liberal Party	46,478	5.13	7
Radical Democratic Party	41,930	4.63	8
NLP Genadiev	26,819	2.96	2
Liberal Party–NLP Petkov–Young Liberals Party (Note: 2 seats for NLP Petkov)	14,469	1.60	2
Democratic Party-People's Party (Note: 1 seat for the Democratic Party and 1 for the People's Party)	8,242	0.91	2
People's Party–Progressive Liberal Party (Note: 1 seat for the People's Party and 1 for the Progressive Liberal Party)	8,065	0.89	2
NLP Petkov	7,785	0.86	1
NLP Petkov + NLP Genadiev (Note: 1 seat for NLP Petkov)	4,933	0.54	1
Liberal Party–NLP Petkov	1,541	0.17	0
Liberal Party–Young Liberals Party	3,205	0.35	0
Other BZNS groups	47	0.01	0
Total	905,618	100.00	229
Valid votes	905,618	98.96	
Invalid/blank votes	9,554	1.04	
Total votes	915,172	100.00	
Registered voters/turnout	1,184,577	77.26	
Source: National Statistical Institute

== Aftermath ==
The BZNS government annulled the election of 13 deputies – nine of them Communists – which gave them a majority in parliament. The government oversaw significant agrarian reforms - the amount of state-owned land was increased, household landownership was limited to 300 decars, land was distributed to refugees from Thrace and Macedonia, while salaries for members of the intelligentsia (teachers, doctors, lawyers and the military) were decreased. The Labor Service Act required 12 months of mandatory community service for male citizens over 20 and 6 months for female citizens over 16. Bulgaria became the first former member of the Central Powers to be accepted into the League of Nations in 1920. Due to the government's friendly relationship with Yugoslavia (later resulting in the signing of the Treaty of Niš), defense minister Alexander Dimitrov was murdered by the VMRO in 1921. Church institutions were placed under state control in 1922. The leaders of the opposition Constitutional Bloc were arrested and given large prison sentences. In September 1922 Interior minister Rayko Daskalov proposed an electoral reform that would make the results proportional in each administrative municipality, as opposed to province, which would result in a larger majority for the more consolidated BZNS. The government resigned and snap elections were called shortly after the law was approved in late February 1923.
