= Elka Konstantinova =

Bulgarian literary critic and politician (1932–2023)

Minister of Culture
- In office 8 November 1991 – 30 December 1992
- Preceded by: Dimo Dimov
- Succeeded by: Marin Todorov

Member of the National Assembly of Bulgaria
- In office 4 November 1991 – 17 October 1994

Member of the Grand National Assembly of Bulgaria
- In office 10 July 1990 – 2 October 1991

Personal details
- Born: Elka Georgieva Konstantinova; 25 May 1932 Sofia, Bulgaria
- Died: 12 January 2023 (aged 90)
- Party: Radical Democratic Party
- Education: Sofia University
- Occupation: Literary critic

Elka Georgieva Konstantinova (Bulgarian: Елка Георгиева Константинова; 25 May 1932 – 12 January 2023) was a Bulgarian literary critic and politician. A member of the Radical Democratic Party, she served as Minister of Culture from 1991 to 1992.

Konstantinova died on 12 January 2023, at the age of 90.
