= Bulgarian Workers Union =

The Bulgarian Workers Union (Bulgarian: Български работнически съюз; BRS) was a trade union-structure in Bulgaria, founded in 1935 by the royal regime (after socialist and communist trade unions had been banned). Membership in BRS was compulsory for workers at the time. Albeit being a state-controlled entity, BRS was however able to articulate (until 1941, when Bulgaria entered the Second World War) some workers demands in dialogues with the government and state enterprises. At liberation in 1944, BRS had been disbanded.
