= 1902 Bulgarian parliamentary election =

- 17 February 1902
- All 189 seats in the National Assembly; 95 seats needed for a majority
- Turnout: 49.79%
| Party | Leader | Vote % | Seats | +/– |
|---|---|---|---|---|
| Progressive Liberal | Stoyan Danev | 30.09 | 82 | +51 |
| People's Party | Ivan Geshov | 20.27 | 32 | +7 |
| People's Liberal | Dimitar Petkov | 11.32 | 9 | −22 |
| LP (Radoslavists) | Vasil Radoslavov | 6.99 | 8 | +3 |
| BZNS | Yanko Zabunov | 6.11 | 12 | −1 |
| Democratic | Petko Karavelov | 5.88 | 8 | −19 |
| BRSDP | Yanko Sakazov; Dimitar Blagoev | 4.76 | 8 | +6 |
| Young Democratic | Naycho Tsanov | 2.29 | 6 | New |
| Ind. Liberals | | 1.04 | 1 | New |
| Turkish Group | | 0.86 | 4 | New |
| Ind. Democrats | | 0.78 | 1 | −1 |
| Conservatives | | 0.51 | 2 | 0 |
| Democratic-Republican | | 0.50 | 1 | +1 |
| Undetermined | – | 2.81 | 2 | +2 |
| Independents | – | 5.36 | 13 | −11 |
This lists parties that won seats. See the complete results below.
| Prime Minister before | Prime Minister after |
|---|---|
| Stoyan Danev; Danev I (PLP) | Stoyan Danev; Danev II (PLP) |

Parliamentary elections were held in Bulgaria on 17 February 1902 to elect members of the XII Ordinary National Assembly. The result was a victory for the ruling Progressive Liberal Party. Voter turnout was 50%.

== Results ==
| Party | Votes | % | Seats | +/– |
|---|---|---|---|---|
| Progressive Liberal Party | 298,310 | 30.09 | 82 | +51 |
| People's Party | 200,972 | 20.27 | 32 | +7 |
| People's Liberal Party | 112,242 | 11.32 | 9 | –22 |
| Liberal Party (Radoslavists) | 69,252 | 6.99 | 8 | +3 |
| Bulgarian Agrarian National Union | 60,551 | 6.11 | 12 | –1 |
| Democratic Party | 58,299 | 5.88 | 8 | –19 |
| Bulgarian Workers' Social Democratic Party | 47,172 | 4.76 | 8 | +6 |
| Young Democratic Party | 22,698 | 2.29 | 6 | New |
| Independent Liberals | 10,282 | 1.04 | 1 | +1 |
| Turkish group | 8,570 | 0.86 | 4 | New |
| Indepdendent Democrats | 7,685 | 0.78 | 1 | –1 |
| Conservative Party | 5,055 | 0.51 | 2 | 0 |
| Democratic-Republican | 4,929 | 0.50 | 1 | +1 |
| Independent People's Liberals | 2,673 | 0.27 | 0 | New |
| Reformists | 1,131 | 0.11 | 0 | –5 |
| Others | 601 | 0.06 | 0 | 0 |
| Undetermined | 27,858 | 2.81 | 2 | +2 |
| Independents | 53,142 | 5.36 | 13 | –11 |
| Total | 991,422 | 100.00 | 189 | +22 |
| Total votes | 404,497 | – | | |
| Registered voters/turnout | 812,467 | 49.79 | | |
Source: National Statistical Institute

=== By-elections ===
Several MPs were elected in more than one constituency and were required to choose which one to represent when the Assembly convened, resulting in ten seats being vacated. By-elections were held on 1 September 1902. This resulted in the Progressive Liberal Party becoming the largest party with 89 seats.

| Party | Seats |
|---|---|
| Progressive Liberal Party | 89 |
| People's Party | 28 |
| Bulgarian Agrarian National Union | 12 |
| People's Liberal Party | 8 |
| Liberal Party | 7 |
| Democratic Party | 7 |
| Bulgarian Workers' Social Democratic Party | 7 |
| Young Democratic Party | 6 |
| Turkish group | 4 |
| Conservative Party | 2 |
| Independent Democrats | 1 |
| Democratic-Republican | 1 |
| Independent Liberals | 1 |
| Undetermined | 3 |
| Independents | 13 |
| Total | 189 |
Source: National Statistical Institute

== Aftermath ==
The ruling pro-Russian PLP continued in a minority government, with the support of the NP. Prime Minister Stoyan Danev's three consecutive governments implemented judicial, trade, taxation and administrative reforms. Due to the diplomatic crisis with Romania following the assassination of Ștefan Mihăileanu by the VMOK, Bulgaria did not support the VMOK organized Gorna Dzhumaya Uprising. Backed by Russia, with which a secret defense protocol was signed in 1902, Danev proposed reforms in Ottoman-controlled Macedonia after the defeat of the uprising. Parliament approved a loan with the Paribas Bank, which helped resolve the financial crisis and was used to pay Bulgaria's occupational debt. Danev resigned in early May 1903, following a dispute between Prince Ferdinand and National enlightenment minister Aleksandar Radev. Ferdinand appointed an NLP government led by independent Racho Petrov and scheduled a snap election for October.
