= 1886 Bulgarian Constitutional Assembly election =

1886 Constitutional Assembly Elections for Bulgaria

Constitutional Assembly elections were held in Bulgaria in 1886. The body known as the Grand National Assembly (Bulgaria: Велико народно събрание - Veliko Narodno Subranie) was convened for a third time in order to elect a new prince following the abdication of Alexander I. The assembly was composed of 493 representatives and convened on 19 October 1886. It then dissolved itself on 3 August 1887, having elected Ferdinand Saxe-Coburg and Gotha as the new prince of Bulgaria.
