= Constitutional Bloc (Bulgaria) =

Early-1920s political alliance in Bulgaria

The Constitutional Bloc (Bulgarian: Конституционен блок) was a political alliance in Bulgaria in the early 1920s. It was formed by parties that opposed the ruling Bulgarian Agrarian National Union (BANU) in the early 1920s.

== History ==
The alliance was formed on 6 July 1922 by the United People's Progressive Party, the Democratic Party and the Radical Democratic Party, and aligned itself with the People's Alliance. It also launched a new newspaper called Slovo (Word).

The alliance won 17 seats in the April 1923 elections, and also ran a joint list with the Bulgarian Social Democratic Workers' Party (Broad Socialists) that failed to win a seat. However, its most prominent leaders were arrested and held prisoner on charges of being responsible for the defeats in the Second Balkan War and World War I. As a result, the party engineered a coup d'état that overthrew the BANU government. In August most of the alliance's leadership joined the new Democratic Alliance, after which it was dissolved.
