= National Liberal Party (Bulgaria) =

Bulgarian political party

National Liberal Party Националлиберална партия
- Founded: 29 November 1920
- Merger of: Liberal Party (Radoslavists); People's Liberal Party; Young Liberals Party
- Headquarters: Sofia
- Ideology: National liberalism

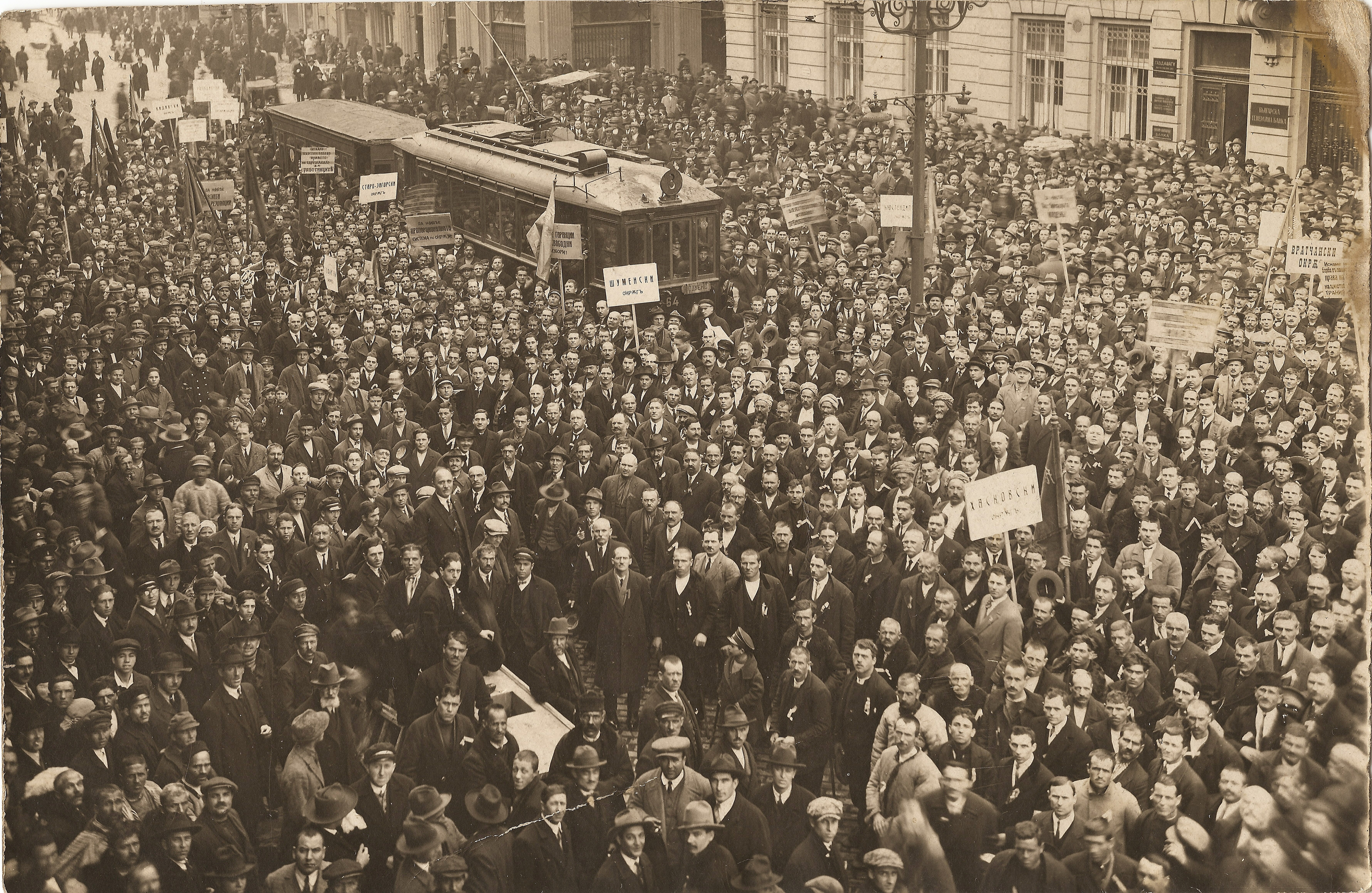
Congress of the National Liberal Party, March 1927

The National Liberal Party (Bulgarian: Националлиберална партия, Natsionalliberalna partija, NLP) was a political party in Bulgaria, established on 29 November 1920 by a merger of the Liberal Party (Radoslavists), both factions of the People's Liberal Party and the Young Liberals Party.

== Background ==
=== 19th century ===
All of the predecessor parties originated from a split in the remaining hardliners of the Liberal Party in 1886 between the pro-Austrian Stambolov faction and the pro-Russian Karavelov faction. The latter became the Democratic Party, while the former - the People's Liberal Party. The People's Liberal party under Stambolov led the government between August 1886 and July 1887 and between September 1887 and May 1894. While in power, the party had authoritarian tendenceies. In 1887 a group around former Prime Minister Vasil Radoslavov split off to found the Radoslavists Liberals. In 1904 a faction of Radoslavists led by former Chairman of Parliament Dimitar Tonchev founded the Young Liberals Party.

=== United Liberal Party ===
In 1899 the People's Liberals and the Radoslavists briefly merged as the United Liberal Party. The Radoslavist dominated Grekov and Ivanchov governments were in power between 1899 and 1901.

=== Early 20th century ===
During the second rule of the People's Liberal Party (1903-1908) the three pro-Austrian parties maintained a close relationship.

=== Liberal Concentration ===
The three parties ruled together between 1913 and mid 1918, with Radoslavov as Prime Minister. A faction led by PLP leader Genagiev left the coalition in 1913. Being seen as the main cause for the Second National Catastrophe, the leaders of the three parties (Radoslavov had already fled to Germany) were ordered arrested in November 1919 and the influence of the parties was greatly diminished in the post-war period. Because of these reasons the four parties decided to move towards merging during the following year.

== History ==
In the April 1923 elections the party received 5.3 of the national vote, but failed to win a seat. The party was involved in the June 1923 coup that overthrew the Bulgarian Agrarian National Union government, and was briefly in government in 1923 with one minister, Boyan Smilov. As the three predecessor parties had previously had pro-Central Powers foreign policies during World War I, other parties were unwilling to co-operate with the NLP, which was the main reason why it wasn't incorporated into the Democratic Alliance. The party had been founded as a less centralized party due to disagreements between the former leaderships and began to split into smaller factions in the mid 1920s. This was exasperated by the release of former party leaders in 1924.

- In mid-September 1923 a group around Nikola Genadiev split off into the National Unity party. Following Genadiev's assassination in October 1923, the party was led by Veliko Savov and Nikola Bronzov. It didn't win any seats in the November 1923 election and in the summer of 1925 it merged into the Stambolovists, and, alongside them, merged back into the NLP in 1928.
- The remaining National Liberals under the leadership of Dimo Kyorchev won eight seats in the November 1923 elections after receiving 13% of the vote. In 1927 they ran in an alliance in opposition to the DA alongside the Democratic Party and the Tomov faction of the Bulgarian Agrarian National Union.
  - In July 1925 a group around Dimitar Petkov refounded the People's Liberal (Stambolovist) Party. In the 1927 election they ran in a coalition with the ruling DA and won a majority., but was not given any ministerial positions. In September 1928 the faction merged back into the party.
  - In November 1926 a group around former minister Boyan Smilov founded the National Liberal United Party. In 1927 they ran alone and won one seat. In July 1929 the faction merged back into the party.

The instability within the party continued after the death of its leader Kyorchev in 1929 and his deputy Metodi Hranov. The new party leader was Georgi Petrov, who aligned the party with the opposition People's Bloc. The reunification of the party in the 1929 was short-lived and it continued to split:

- In July 1930, Boyan Smilov refounded the National Liberal United Party. It joined the DA government with two ministers in May 1931 and ran with the DA in the 1931 election. Following their electoral loss, the party was left in opposition and, seeing its influence significantly diminished, this faction merged back into the ruling NLP in April 1934.
- The remaining National Liberals ran within the People's Bloc in the 1931 election and subsequently joined the new government and maintained two ministerial positions until the 1934 coup.
  - A faction led by P. N. Daskalov left the People's Bloc government and the party in September 1932.
  - A faction led by party leader Petrov left the People's Bloc government and the party in March 1933.

Following the 1934 coup, the party was dissolved and most of its factions became inactive.

- The Petrov faction was in opposition to the monarchist government and won one seat in the 1938 election.
- The main faction, led by Smilov, was in opposition to the monarchist government and joined the Committee of Five (Petorka), which aimed to restore the Tarnovo Constitution. In the 1938 election the Petorka won 41 seats, with two going to the Smilov-led faction of the NLP. The faction left the Committee of Five (which disbanded soon afterwards) in early 1939 and following the outbreak of WW2, most of its leadership switched sides to support the government.

The party received 2.3% of the vote in the 1939 elections.

A party named National Liberal Party 'Stefan Stambolov' was established after the fall of the communist regime, and was part of the Coalition for Bulgaria alliance in the 1991 parliamentary elections. The party ran alone in the 1994 parliamentary elections, but received just 0.06% of the vote.
