= United People's Progressive Party =

1920–1934 political party in Bulgaria

United People's Progressive Party Обединена народно-прогресивна партия
- Abbreviation: ONPP
- Leader: Ivan Evstratiev Geshov
- Founded: 1920
- Merger of: People's Party; Progressive Liberal Party
- National affiliation: Constitutional Bloc; Democratic Alliance

The United People's Progressive Party (Bulgarian: Обединена народно-прогресивна партия, Obedinena narodno-progresivna partiya, ONPP) was a political party in Bulgaria.

== History ==
The party was formed by a merger of the People's Party and the Progressive Liberal Party in 1920, with People's Party leader Ivan Evstratiev Geshov elected as the new party's first leader. The ONPP joined the Constitutional Bloc alliance for the April 1923 elections, which won 17 seats.

Following the June 1923 coup, the party merged into the Democratic Alliance, which went on to win elections in November 1923.

Breakaways from the Democratic Alliance affiliated with the ONPP contested in the November 1923 and 1927 elections, but failed to win a seat.
