= Andrey Lyapchev =

Bulgarian politician (1866–1933)

Andrey Tasev Lyapchev Андрей Тасев Ляпчев
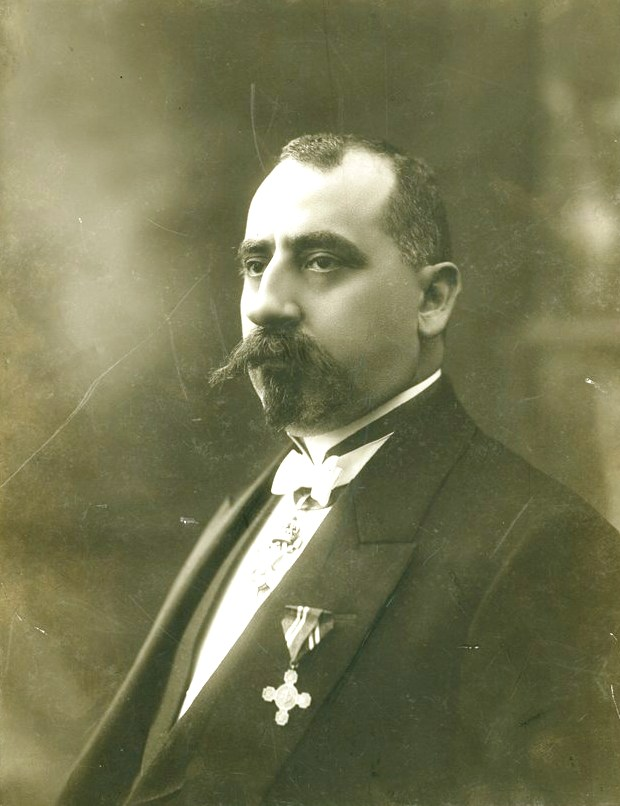

22nd Prime Minister of Bulgaria
- In office 4 January 1926 – 29 June 1931
- Monarch: Boris III
- Preceded by: Aleksandar Tsankov
- Succeeded by: Aleksandar Malinov

Personal details
- Born: 30 November 1866 Resen, Ottoman Empire (present-day North Macedonia)
- Died: 6 November 1933 (aged 66) Sofia, Bulgaria
- Resting place: Central Sofia Cemetery
- Party: Democratic Alliance (since 1923); Democratic Party (until 1923)
- Spouse: Konstanza Lyapcheva

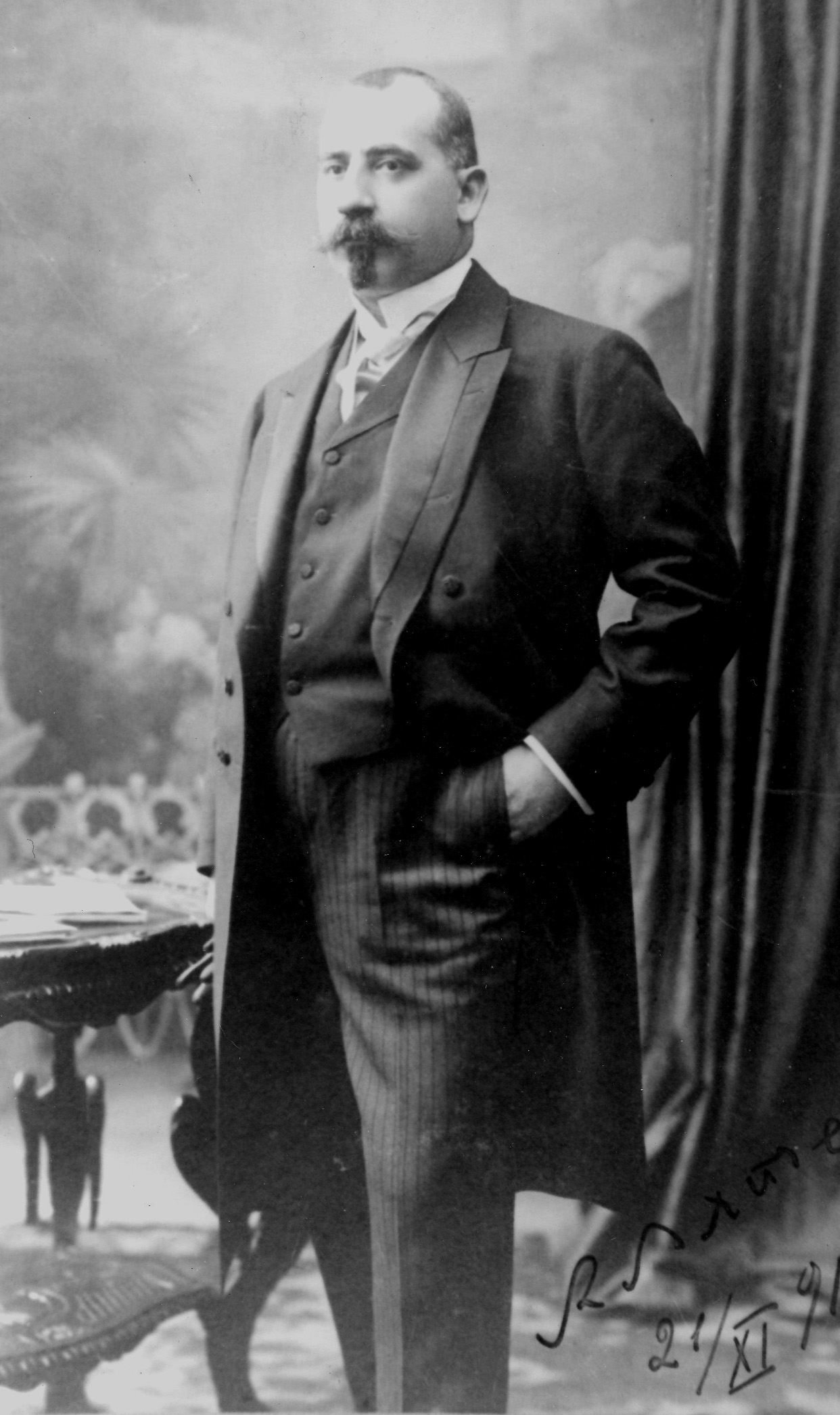

Andrey Tasev Lyapchev (Tarpov) (Bulgarian: Андрей Тасев Ляпчев (Tърпов); 30 November 1866 – 6 November 1933) was a Bulgarian Prime Minister in three consecutive governments.

== Early years ==
Lyapchev was born in the Macedonian city of Resen, which was at the time a part of the Ottoman Empire, and played a leading role in Bulgarian politics. Lyapchev's family is thought to have originated from a certain Dore, a Megleno-Romanian potter who fled the Islamization of his native Notia and settled in Resen in the 18th century.

Andrey Lyapchev started his education in Resen but after the April Uprising of 1876 the local school was shut down by Ottoman authorities, following the fate of many other Bulgarian schools in Macedonia. He spent the next three years helping his brother Georgi run his shop in Bitola. Georgi was left to take care of the family after the death of their father. In 1879 Lyapchev signed in the Bitola gymnasium and two years later he moved to the newly established Bulgarian Men's High School of Thessaloniki. One of his teacher's there was his fellow-townsman Trayko Kitanchev, who had a significant influence on the young student. After Kitanchev's dismissal in 1884 Lyapchev left the school and moved to Plovdiv together with his teacher. At the time Plovdiv was the main city of the Autonomous Province of Eastern Rumelia.

Together with other Macedonian students of the Plovdiv gymnasium, like Pere Toshev and Nikola Genadiev, Lyapchev got closer with Zahari Stoyanov and the Bulgarian Secret Central Revolutionary Committee which was preparing the future unification between Eastern Rumelia and the Principality of Bulgaria. He was sent to the Panagyurishte committee on 2 September 1885, but authorities arrested him on the way. He was let free only after the Unification had been proclaimed on 6 September. With the beginning of the Serbo-Bulgarian War on 2 September 1885, the whole group signed in the First Volunteers Corps. However, by order of Knyaz Aleksander I students were left at the rear of the advancing army. Nevertheless, Lyapchev and the rest managed to reach the captured town of Pirot. There they were eventually de-mobilised in December, returning to Plovdiv afterwards.

In the summer of 1886 Russia organised a coup d’état which resulted in the disposal of Knyaz Aleksandar I and in a drastic interference of Russian generals in the internal affairs of Bulgaria. These events made Lyapchev even more sympathetic to the cause of the extreme nationalists led by Zahari Stoyanov, Dimitar Petkov and Dimitar Rizov. The latter was a prominent figure among Macedonian emigrants at the time. Lyapchev even went on to lead a group of nationalists that beat up conservative politician Todor Burmov, a deed that Lyapchev himself later dismissed.

In the following months relations between Lyapchev, on one side, and the Stambolovist government and Zahari Stoyanov on the other, grew colder, and Lyapchev got closer with Dimitar Rizov. Tensions between authorities and the Macedonian emigration intensified even further after Kosta Panitsa was jailed and sentenced to death over allegations of organising a coup d’état. In the summer of 1888 Rizov published articles critical to the Prime Minister Stefan Stambolov and was also sentenced to two years in jail. A warrant was issued with Lyapchev's name on it, but he managed to leave the country.

== Political career ==
He entered the Bulgarian parliament in 1908 and before long rose to ministerial rank. In this role he signed the 1908 treaty that established Bulgarian independence as well as the 1918 Armistice of Salonica. After the First World War he became the first civilian to hold the post of Minister of War. He fell out of favour under Aleksandar Stamboliyski and was imprisoned between 1922 and the military coup of 1923.

Lyapchev became prime minister on 4 January 1926 at the head of a coalition between the Democratic Alliance and the National Liberal Party. Lyapchev generally pursued a more moderate line than his predecessor Aleksandar Tsankov, declaring an amnesty for Communist prisoners (although the Communist Party officially remained banned). He also secured two loans from the League of Nations to help bolster the economy, although economic problems were exacerbated by an earthquake in Plovdiv. He was, however, criticized for his toleration of the activities of the Internal Macedonian Revolutionary Organization which strained relations with Yugoslavia and Greece.

Despite his more moderate stance Bulgaria struggled to cope with the Great Depression and so he lost the 1931 election. He died in Sofia two years later.

Political offices
Preceded by Aleksandar Tsankov	Prime Minister of Bulgaria; 1926–1931	Succeeded by Aleksandar Malinov
Political offices
Preceded by Sava Savov	Minister of War of Bulgaria; 1918–1919	Succeeded by Mihail Madzharov
