= Atanas Burov =

Bulgarian politician (1875–1954)

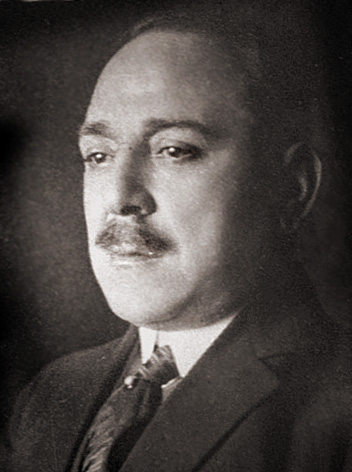
- Born: 30 January 1875; Gorna Oryahovitsa, Ottoman Empire
- Died: 15 May 1954 (aged 79); Pazardzhik, Bulgaria
- Occupation: banker

Atanas Dimitrov Burov (Bulgarian: Атанас Димитров Буров; 30 January 1875 – 15 May 1954) was a Bulgarian banker, philanthropist and politician.

== Family background ==
Burov was born in Gorna Oryahovitsa. Members of his family played an active role in the national liberation movement, the educational and cultural reforms, the setting up of the national financial system and industry. The father — Dimitar Burov established the Commercial & Credit House — Burov.D.A&Co in 1862. After the Liberation the company expanded its activities and was reorganised as a joint-stock company. The Burov company was among the founders of "Bulgaria: First Bulgarian Insurance Company" (1895) and the Bulgarian Commercial Bank in 1891.

== Education ==
- 1895 Atanas Burov graduated from the most prestigious secondary school in Gabrovo, Bulgaria.
- 1895–1900 studied law and economy in Paris.

== Business and political life ==
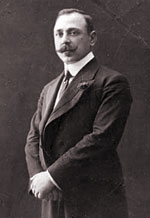
Atanas Burov

After returning from Paris, Atanas Burov started working in the family business. He studied industries with great potential, took the initiative to establish joint-stock companies, participated in the development of railroad constructing, mining, and other industries. The prosperity of his business activity provided him with stability, independent civil opinion and freedom to act as a politician. Burov joined politics as an active member of the People's Party and very soon became the ideologist of the Bulgarian bourgeoisie. He soon became one of the leaders of the party, who always had the national and people's interests as a priority.

From 1911 until 1934 he was a member of the Bulgarian Parliament and a minister in four governments:

- Minister of Commerce, 14 June 1913 – 17 July 1913
- Minister of Commerce, Industry and Labour, 6 October 1919 – 20 April 1920
- Minister of Foreign Affairs, 4 January 1926 – 29 June 1931
- Government minister, 2 September 1944 – 9 September 1944

Burov never allowed compromises with and breach of the principles of democracy and always opposed to totalitarian and dictatorship regimes. As a foreign minister he contributed much to the improvement of Bulgaria's image and relations with neighbouring countries. He was an elected member of the Political Commission of the League of Nations. Together with financial minister Mollov he succeeded in negotiating the Refugee Loan, the Stability Loan and extending the moratorium on the Reparation Debts. In 1920 he was elected Secretary of the United People's Progressive Party and expanded the social base of this formation attracting personalities from other political groups. He created the People's Union.

== The communist regime ==
After the communist coup d'état on 9 September 1944, the People's Court sentenced Burov to one year of imprisonment. After being released, he joined the opposition in their fight against the establishment of communism, but was exiled to the town of Dryanovo in 1948, then arrested in 1950 and sentenced again, this time to a 20 years term. He died in the Pazardzhik prison on 15 May 1954. In modern democratic Bulgarian history, the life of Atanas Burov is an example of decent life, dedicated entirely to Bulgaria. In 2000, he was proclaimed an Honoured Citizen of Gorna Oryahovitsa.

== Burov Hall at the Ministry of Finance ==
In 2010, Finance Minister Simeon Djankov inaugurated the Burov Hall at the Ministry of Finance, in honor of Atanas Burov. The hall contains the original desk and bookcase of Burov, as well as the original national budgets from 1880 onward. The only surviving oilpaint portrait of Atanas Burov is also at the hall, on loan from the Bulgarian Development Bank. The Ministry of Finance has initiated a program to collect the Burov manuscripts.

Political offices
Preceded by Hristo Kalfov	Minister of Foreign Affairs of Bulgaria; 1926–1931	Succeeded by Aleksandar Malinov
