= National Social Movement =

National Social Movement Народно социално движение
- Abbreviation: NSD
- Leader: Aleksandar Tsankov
- Founded: May 15, 1932
- Banned: September 1934
- Split from: Democratic Alliance
- Headquarters: Sofia
- Ideology: Nazism; Fascism; Bulgarian nationalism Anti-communism
- Political position: Far-right
- Colours: Gold Black

The National Social Movement (Bulgarian: Народно социално движение, Narodno sotsialno dvizhenie) was a minor Bulgarian political party formed in 1932 by Aleksandar Tsankov.

Although a member of the governing People's Bloc of Nikola Mushanov, Tsankov had come to be a strong admirer of Adolf Hitler and as a result he set up the NSM to offer a version of Nazism. The group avowedly preached its own idea of 'social nationalism' which for Tsankov involved support of a national workers' syndicate against class struggle. The party itself failed to find much favour (despite being popular with many urban youth), although its formation helped to speed up the collapse of the coalition government. The group did gain some following in 1934 when a number of members left Zveno to join other groups, including the NSM. The party was dissolved after the coup d'état of 1934 just like every other political party.

The group maintained links with Nazi Germany, as evidenced by the appointment of Tsankov to the leadership of a government in exile in 1944, although it did not gain power.

== See also ==
- Fascism in Bulgaria
