= 1903 Bulgarian parliamentary election =

- 19 October 1903
- All 189 seats in the National Assembly; 95 seats needed for a majority
- Turnout: 41.17%
Party	Leader	Seats	+/–
People's Liberal	Dimitar Petkov	132	+123
People's Party	Ivan Geshov	25	−7
LP (Radoslavists)	Vasil Radoslavov	9	+1
Democratic	Aleksandar Malinov	7	−1
Progressive Liberal	Stoyan Danev	6	−76
Tonchevist Liberals	Dimitar Tonchev	3	New
Ind. People's Liberals		2	New
Ind. Liberals		1	0
Conservatives		1	−1
Undetermined	–	2	0
Independents	–	1	−12
This lists parties that won seats. See the complete results below.
Prime Minister before	Prime Minister after
Racho Petrov; Petrov II (Ind. + NLP)	Racho Petrov; Petrov II (Ind. + NLP)

Parliamentary elections were held in Bulgaria on 19 October 1903 to elect members of the XIII Ordinary National Assembly. Voter turnout was 41%. The result was a victory for the ruling People's Liberal Party.

== Results ==
By-elections were held to fill vacant seats on 19 October 1903, 29 February 1904, 20 March 1905, 16 March 1906 and 1 April 1907. This resulted in the People's Liberal Party winning 132 seats.

Party	Votes	%	Seats	+/–
People's Liberal Party			132	+123
People's Party			25	–7
Liberal Party (Radoslavists)			9	+1
Democratic Party			7	–1
Progressive Liberal Party			6	–76
Tonchevist Liberals			3	New
Independent People's Liberals			2	New
Independent Liberals			1	0
Conservative Party			1	–1
Undetermined			2	0
Independents			1	–12
Total			189	0
Total votes	345,682	–		
Registered voters/turnout	839,605	41.17		
Source: National Statistical Institute

== Aftermath ==
The ruling NLP won a majority and formed several governments, led by Racho Petrov (1903–1906), Dimitar Petkov (1906–1907), Dimitar Stanchov (interim in 1907) and Petar Gudev (1907–1908). Characterised by authoritarian tendencies, repressive measures against the opposition and increasing political influence of the monarch Prince Ferdinand, they are sometimes referred to as the "Second Stambolovist regime". Their policies during this period included trade protectionism, large-scale railway and road construction, centralization, property rights legislation and education reform. Additionally, relations with the neighboring Ottoman Empire and Serbia grew closer, notably with the signing of the Treaty of Sofia.

In late 1903 the government issued an amnesty for several Radoslavist former ministers, who had been imprisoned that June. Following the defeat of the Ilinden–Preobrazhenie Uprising, which resulted in significant immigration of Bulgarians from the Ottoman Empire, and the failed Serbian-Ottoman talks in March 1904, the government began funding the VMRO. During this period, Bulgaria experienced record growth in industry, investment, and trade. The army was significantly expanded and rearmed with Schneider field guns, and by 1906, military expenditures accounted for nearly 30% of the state budget. Petrov resigned following a series of corruption scandals, notably the Charles-Jean affair and was succeeded as PM by NLP leader Petkov.

Petkov's tenure saw significant social unrest and mass protests, culminating in the 1907 University crisis. Following his assassination in March, there was a leadership struggle within the NLP. Nikola Genadiev, the new party leader, agreed to have his two main opponents (Dobri Petkov and Petar Gudev) placed in high positions of power as Chairman of Parliament and PM respectively.

In January 1908 Prince Ferdinand tasked Democratic Party leader Aleksandar Malinov with forming a new government and scheduled snap elections for May.
