= Aleksandar Tsankov =

21st Prime Minister of Bulgaria (1923–26)

Aleksandar Tsankov Александър Цанков
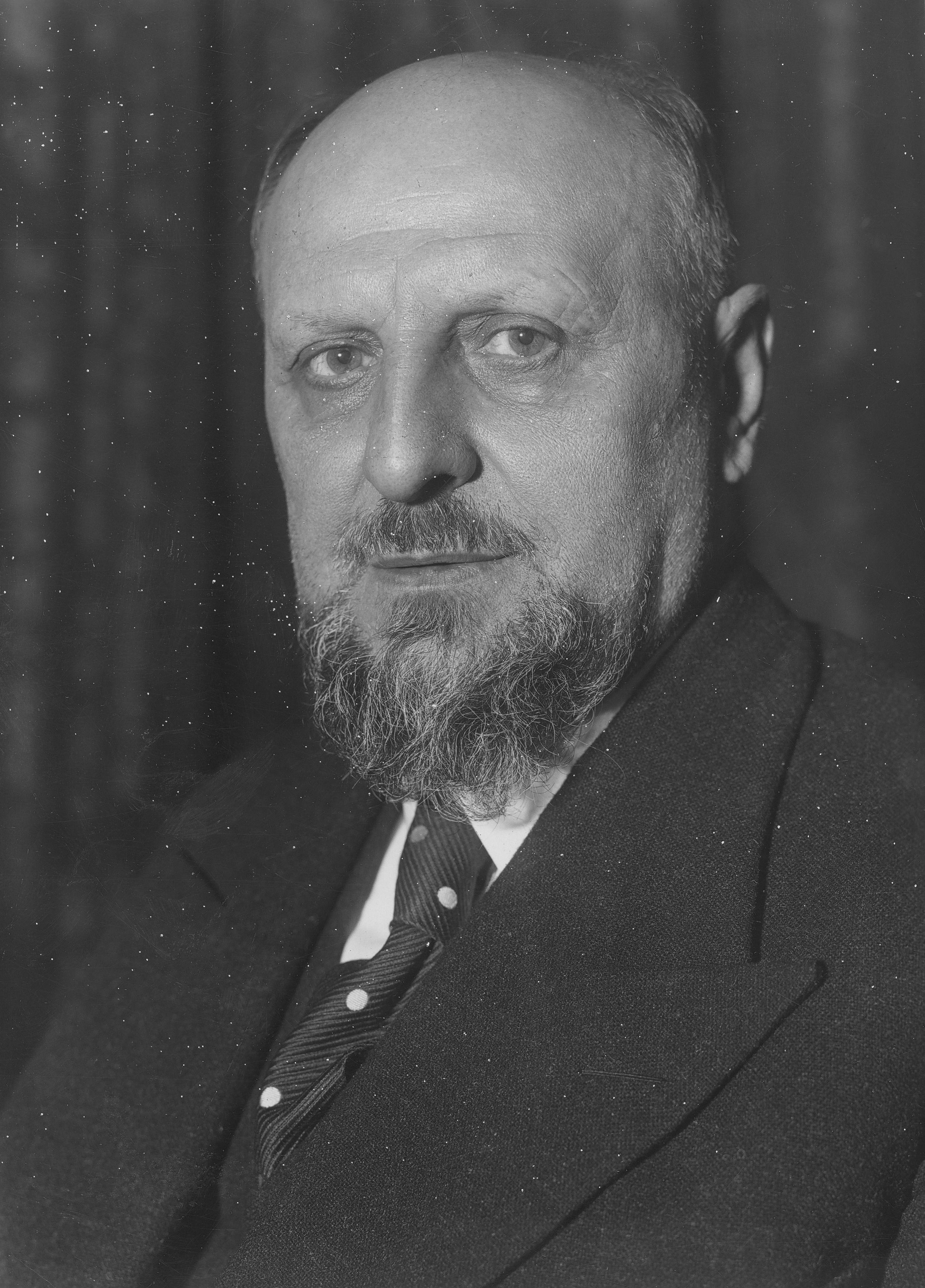
- Tsankov in 1944

21st Prime Minister of Bulgaria
- In office 9 June 1923 – 4 January 1926
- Monarch: Boris III
- Preceded by: Aleksandar Stamboliyski
- Succeeded by: Andrey Lyapchev

Prime Minister of the Bulgarian government-in-exile
- In office 16 September 1944 – 10 May 1945
- Preceded by: Position established
- Succeeded by: Position abolished

Personal details
- Born: 29 June 1879 Oryahovo, Bulgaria
- Died: 27 July 1959 (aged 80) Buenos Aires, Argentina
- Party: Democratic Alliance (1923-1932); National Social Movement (1932 afterwards)

Aleksandar Tsolov Tsankov (Bulgarian: Александър Цолов Цанков; 29 June 1879 – 27 July 1959) was a leading Bulgarian politician during the period between the two World Wars.

== Biography ==
A professor of political economy at Sofia University from 1910 onwards, he took a leading role in the coup that deposed Aleksandar Stamboliyski on 9 June 1923. The coup succeeded when the Bulgarian Communist Party took a neutral attitude towards the Agrarians rather than supporting Stamboliyski. He was chosen to head the coalition that succeeded the deposed premier, and became Prime Minister of Bulgaria the same day. He continued in this role until 4 January 1926. During that period, he was the leader of the Democratic Alliance. Tsankov's premiership was marked by deep internal struggles with the Bulgarian Communist Party, which he repressed mercilessly, declaring martial law and outlawing the Communists in 1925 following an attempt on Tsar Boris's life and a bomb attack on the St Nedelya Cathedral. His actions led to the Comintern denouncing his government as a "victorious Bulgarian fascist clique"; he later turned his attentions to the Agrarian Peoples Union, which was also suppressed, albeit less ferociously.

A brief invasion by Greek troops followed, and although they did not stay long following condemnation by the League of Nations, the country was left crippled by debt. Tsankov was removed from office after failing to secure a loan for the country. Support for him had dwindled as the people tired of his reign of terror.

After being removed from the political mainstream, Tsankov began to develop an admiration for Fascism and soon became a supporter of Adolf Hitler. In 1932, he set up his own National Social Movement mainly in imitation of the Nazi Party. The movement proved relatively unimportant (although it did represent a further fragmentation of the governing coalition), lacking the support of Zveno and failing to secure Nazi approval, which was primarily reserved for the Union of Bulgarian National Legions. Nonetheless, Tsankov was appointed by the Nazis in 1944 as prime minister of the Bulgarian government-in-exile set up in Germany in response to Kimon Georgiev's Fatherland Front government. This was even though Tsankov had been a signatory, one of only two from the right-wing opposition, to Dimitar Peshev's letter calling for an end to the deportation of Jews. Tsankov fled to Argentina after the Second World War, and died in Belgrano, Buenos Aires, in 1959.

== See also ==
- White Terror
- Red Terror
- The incident at Petrich
- European interwar dictatorships

Political offices
Preceded by Aleksandar Stamboliyski	Prime Minister of Bulgaria; 1923–1926	Succeeded by Andrey Lyapchev
Preceded by Aleksandar Stamboliyski	Minister of Foreign Affairs of Bulgaria; 1923	Succeeded by Hristo Kalfov
Preceded by Konstantin Muraviev	Minister of War of Bulgaria; 1923	Succeeded by Ivan Valkov
