= Bulgarian Agrarian National Union =

Agrarian political party in Bulgaria

Bulgarian Agrarian National Union Български земеделски народен съюз
- Abbreviation: BZNS
- Leader: Iliya Zyumbilev
- Founded: 30 December 1899
- Headquarters: Sofia
- Newspaper: Земеделско знаме
- Paramilitary wing: Orange Guard (1919–1923)
- Ideology: Agrarianism; Historical: Agrarian socialism
- Political position: Centre; Historical: Left-wing
- National affiliation: Fatherland Front (1943–1990)
- Colours: Orange; Green
- National Assembly: 0 / 240
- European Parliament: 0 / 17

Party flag

Website
- www.bzns.bg

The Bulgarian Agrarian National Union (Note: also translated to English as Bulgarian Agrarian People's Union) (Bulgarian: Български земеделски народен съюз, romanized: Bŭlgarski zemedelski naroden sŭyuz, BZNS), is a political party devoted to representing the causes of the Bulgarian peasantry. It was an agrarian movement and was most powerful between 1900 and 1923. Unlike the socialist movements of the early 20th century, it was devoted to questions concerning agriculture and farmers, rather than industry and factory workers. The BZNS, one of the first and most powerful of the agrarian parties in Eastern Europe, dominated Bulgarian politics during the beginning of the 20th century. It is also the only agrarian party in Europe that ever came to power with a majority government, rather than merely as part of a coalition. It is a founding member of the former International Agrarian Bureau.

== History ==
An Agrarian Union was first organized in Bulgaria in 1899. It was to be a professional organization open only to peasants and was at first not meant to become a political party. The Union initially won widespread peasant support by mobilizing peasants throughout Bulgaria to peaceful demonstrations against the government's unfair taxation policies. While condemning the government's suppression of peasant protests against the tithe, the Union remained politically unaligned. However, at its third congress, motivated by upcoming elections for the Bulgarian National Assembly, the Union leaders, who were not peasants themselves but a group of teachers, voted to become a political party. Thus, in 1901, the Agrarian Union became the Bulgarian Agrarian National Union, Bulgaria's official peasant party. BZNS candidates subsequently ran for positions in local and national elections.

Over the next twenty years, the BZNS remained a part of Bulgarian politics, but it began to falter for lack of a concrete ideological base. Aleksandar Stamboliyski saved the party from that plight by first publishing a series of theoretical articles on the peasants’ role in the state and history, and finally taking control of the BZNS party. In 1909 he wrote the book Political Parties or Estatist Organizations, which laid the foundations for the ideology of the BZNS. Stamboliyski rose through the ranks of the BZNS and by 1918 had become the leader of the party. World War I left Bulgaria in a state of severe social and economic crisis, and after a series of worker and peasant strikes and uprisings between 1918 and 1920, the Bulgarian army and all old political parties were essentially discredited. In 1920, by a combination of major popular support and some coercive methods, Stamboliyski was able to create a BZNS controlled government. The party also formed a militia, the Orange Guard.

The chief rival of Stamboliyski's BZNS was the Bulgarian Communist Party (BKP). After World War I, the BZNS and the BKP were the two leading parties in Bulgarian politics. Though the BZNS initially beat the Communist Party for political power, its authority quickly began to wane because, according to the communists, the BZNS wavered in its support between the proletariat and the bourgeoisie. Although most of them were not rich, peasants still participated in an old bourgeois economic system, which was, from the Communist point of view, destined to fail.

Though the BKP was always opposed to certain BZNS policies, most other factions became dissatisfied with Stamboliyski and the BZNS because of growing corruption within the party, and an increasingly oppressive rule over the Bulgarian people. On 9 June 1923 a bloc of military factions staged a coup d'état and deposed the Stamboliyski regime. Though the Communists ultimately gained control of the Bulgarian government, the BZNS remained in existence (as a member of the Fatherland Front), and participated in agricultural policy in Bulgaria until the fall of communism in 1989.

== Ideological foundations ==
Stamboliyski believed that over time, new groups which were more attuned to modern political and economic needs would replace old political parties. He detailed this view in the 1909 book Political Parties or Estatist Organizations. In this vein, the BZNS was supposed to be more than a political party. It was meant to retain its original function as a professional organization for peasants, and also involve itself in politics in order to guarantee the protection of the peasant classes. The BZNS was a populist party, and as such supported the rights of the individual peasant over those of the corporation or large-scale landowner.

Stamboliyski believed that mechanized agriculture would never replace the individual peasant, but also that peasant agriculture need not be backward or inefficient. Therefore, he stressed the importance of education in peasant communities. He also emphasized the need for social welfare, and believed that if the state could distribute arable land equally to each family and lower the tax burden on the peasantry, the condition of the Bulgarian peasantry would naturally improve.

== Policies ==
After Stamboliyski came to power, the BZNS organized campaigns for redistribution of land and rural education. These campaigns were largely successful, and the BZNS enjoyed widespread support in the immediate post-war period.

In the international sphere, the BZNS was strictly anti-imperialist in its policies. Stamboliyski thought that the new groups which would supposedly replace the old political parties had the possibility to become international organizations. He hoped for and encouraged an agrarian alliance that would spread outside of Bulgaria to the entire Balkan region. He did not pursue territorial expansion, and generally neglected the army. These policies contributed to the dissatisfaction that led to the overthrow of Stamboliyski and the BZNS in 1923.

== Members of National Assembly ==
1919–1923: 200 MPs
1944–1990: 99 and 100 MPs
1990–2009: from 30 to 7 MPs
2014–2017: 1 MP

== Wings ==
- Bulgarian Agrarian People's Union (kaznionen) – officially called BZNS until 1991 when a group of parliamentarians from the BZNS "Nikola Petkov" united with the party under the name BZNS (United).
- Bulgarian Agrarian People's Union "Nikola Petkov" – restored at the end of 1989 and co-founder of the coalition Union of Democratic Forces. A unifying congress of BZNS (United) and BZNS "Nikola Petkov" united the different agrarian wings under the name BZNS in November 1992.
- Bulgarian Agrarian People's Union (United) – 1991–1992, see above.
- Bulgarian Agrarian People's Union - People's Union – split in 1996 led by Anastasiya Mozer.
- Bulgarian Agrarian People's Union "Aleksandar Stamboliyski" – split in 1993 led by Svetoslav Stoyanov Shivarov.

== Chairmen since 1947 Bulgarian Agrarian People's Union ==
- Georgi Trajkov – from 1947 to 1974
- Petar Tanchev – from 1974 to 1989
- Angel Dimitrov – from 1989 to 1990
- Victor Valkov – from 1990 to 1991
- Tsenko Bareva – from 1991 to 1992 (BZNS United)
- Milan Drenchev – from 1990 to 1992 (BZNS "Nikola Petkov")
- Anastasiya Mozer – from 1992 to 1996
- Georgi Pinchev – from 1996 to 1997
- Petko Iliev – from 1997 to 1999
- Georgi Pinchev since 1999
- Nikolay Nenchev from 2008 to 2022
- Iliya Zyumbilev since 2022

== Deputy chairmen (and functional areas) since 1947 ==
- Kiril Klisurski – from 1948 to spring of 1950 ("Organization")
- Nikolay Georgiev – from spring 1950 to spring 1958 ("Organization") and 1958–1987 ("Finance and administration")
- Petar Tanchev – from spring 1958 to spring 1974 ("Organization")
- Yanko Markov – from 1973 to spring 1989 ("Construction")
- Georgi Andreev – from 1971 to spring 1976 ("International affairs" and "Organization"), spring 1976–1979 ("Agriculture")
- Aleksi Ivanov – from spring 1976 to spring 1989 ("Organization") and from spring 1980–1989 ("Political affairs")
- Angel Dimitrov – from 1974 to spring 1989 ("International affairs")
- Dimitar Karamukov – from 1979 to spring 1984 ("Agriculture")
- Pando Vanchev – from 1986 to spring 1989 ("Agriculture")
- Viktor Valkov – from 1989 to spring 1990 ("International affairs" and "Organization")
- Svetla Daskalova – from 1989 to spring 1990 ("Agriculture" and "Finance and administration")
- Kostadin Yanchev – from 1990 to spring 1991 ("Organization")
- Doncho Karakachanov – from 1993 to spring 1997 ("Organization" [BZNS "Aleksander Stamboliiski"])

== List of ministers of Bulgaria from BZNS 1919–2001 ==
=== BZNS ===
- Aleksandar Stamboliyski – Prime Minister of Bulgaria (1919–1923)
- Rayko Daskalov – Minister of Agriculture (1919–1921)
- Konstantin Muraviev – Prime Minister of Bulgaria (1944)
- Ivan Beshkov – Minister of Agriculture (1943–1944)
- Asen Pavlov – Minister of Agriculture (1944–1945)
- Nikola Petkov – Minister (1944–1945)
- Aleksandar Obbov – Minister of Agriculture and State Property (1945, 1946)
- Mihail Genovski – Minister of Agriculture and State Property (1945–1946)
- Georgi Traykov – Minister of Agriculture and Forestry (1947–1951) and Deputy and First President of Council of Ministers (1951–1964)
- Kiril Klisurski – Minister of Mines (1948–1950)
- Radi Naydenov – Minister of Justice (1947–1958)
- Stoyan Tonchev – Minister of Architecture (1953–1958)
- Petar Tanchev – Minister of Justice (1962–1966) and Deputy and First Deputy President of Council of Ministers (1966–1974)
- Svetla Daskalova (daughter of Rayko Daskalov) – Minister of Justice (1966–1990)
- Haralambi Traykov (the son of Georgi Traykov) – Minister of Information and Communications (1971–1973)
- Yanko Markov – Minister of Forestry (1971–1986)
- Georgi Andreev – Minister of Information and Communications (1973–1976)
- Pando Vanchev – Minister of Communications (1976–1986)
- Aleksi Ivanov – Minister of Agriculture and Forestry (1986–1988) and Deputy President of Council of Ministers (1986–1987)
- Radoy Popivanov – Minister of Public Health and Social Welfare (1977–1988)
- Georgi Menov – Minister of Agriculture and Forestry (1988–1990)
- Mincho Peychev – Minister of Public Health and Social Welfare (1988–1990)
- Viktor Valkov – Minister of Foreign Affairs (1990–1991) and Deputy President of Council of Ministers (1990–1991)

=== Bulgarian Agrarian People's Union "Aleksandar Stamboliyski" ===
- Vasil Chichibaba – Minister of Agriculture and Food Industry (1995–1996)
- Svetoslav Shivarov – Minister of Agriculture and Food Industry (1996) and Deputy President of Council of Ministers (1995–1997)

=== Bulgarian Agrarian People's Union - People's Union ===
- Ventsislav Varbanov – Minister of Agriculture and Forestry and Agrarian Reform (1997–2001)

== Election results ==
=== Parliament ===
Election	Votes	%	Seats	+/-
1899	4,700	1.4%	0 / 169	Steady
1901	22,600	7.7%	12 / 164	▲12
1902	24,710	6.1%	12 / 189	Steady
1903	?	?%	0 / 169	▼12
1908	68,308	14.6%	19 / 203	▲19
1911	71,943	14.3%	4 / 213	▼15
1913	113,761	21.2%	48 / 204	▲44
1914	147,143	19.3%	47 / 245	▼1
1919	176,281	27.3%	77 / 236	▲30
1920	349,212	38.6%	110 / 229	▲33
Apr 1923	569,139	53.8%	212 / 245	▲102
Nov 1923	132,160	13.2%	19 / 247	▼193
1927	285,758	24.8%	46 / 261	▲27
1931 (Note: Results of the alliance Popular Bloc.)	626,553	48.4%	151 / 273	▲105
1938	Banned			
1939	Banned			
1945	?	?%	94 / 276	▼57
1949–1986	Part of the Fatherland Front			
1990	368,929	6.02%	16 / 400	Steady
1991			0 / 240	▼16
1994 (Note: Results of the alliance People's Union.)	338,478	6.51%	18 / 240	▲18
1997 (Note: Results of the alliance Union for National Salvation.)	323,429	7.60%	19 / 240	▲1
2001	15,504	0.34%	0 / 240	▼19
2005	Did not contest			
2009	Did not contest			
2013	7,715	0.22%	0 / 240	Steady
2014 (Note: Results of the alliance Reformist Bloc.)	291,806	8.89%	23 / 240	▲23
2017	107,407	3.06%	0 / 240	▼23
Apr 2021 (Note: Results of the alliance Patriotic Coalition.)	75,926	2.34%	0 / 240	Steady
Jul 2021 (Note: Results of the alliance National Union of the Right.)	7,872	0.28%	0 / 240	Steady
Nov 2021	11,240	0.42%	0 / 240	Steady
since 2022	Did not contest			

=== President ===
Election	Candidate	First round			Second round		
Election	Candidate	Votes	%	Rank	Votes	%	Result
2011	Nikolay Nenchev	9,827	0.29	13th	—N/a		Lost
2016 (Note: Results of the Reformist Bloc, the alliance that BZNS was in.)	Traycho Traykov	224,734	5.87	6th	—N/a		Lost
2021 (Note: BZNS endorsed the candidacy of Anastas Gerdzhikov and Nevyana Miteva, which was nominated by an initiative committee.)	Anastas Gerdzhikov	610,862	22.83	2nd	733,791	31.8	Lost
2026	Nikolay Nenchev	5,783	0.38	10th	—N/a		Lost
