= Democratic Alliance (Bulgaria) =

1923–1934 political party in Bulgaria

Democratic Alliance Демократически сговор Demokraticheski Sgovor
- Abbreviation: DS
- Leader: Aleksandar Tsankov (1923-1926); Andrey Lyapchev (1926-1933)
- Founded: 10 August 1923
- Dissolved: 19 May 1934
- Merger of: People's Alliance; Military Union; Union for Democracy
- Preceded by: Constitutional Bloc
- Ideology: Anti-communism; Authoritarianism; Bulgarian nationalism Corporatism; Conservatism
- Political position: Right-wing

The Democratic Alliance (Bulgarian: Демократически сговор) was a Bulgarian political party that existed between 1923 and the banning of political parties in 1934. During most of that period it was the ruling party in the country, making it the third longest-ruling party in the country after the Bulgarian Communist Party and the People's Liberal Party.

== History ==
After the 9 June coup d'état in 1923 its organizers from the Military Union and the People's Alliance tried to create a new party in order to ensure stable political and parliamentary basis for the new government. For that purpose they relied on the member parties of the Constitutional Bloc whose leaders were imprisoned by the government of Aleksandar Stamboliyski.

After the dissolution of the Constitutional Bloc in the end of July and the beginning of August, the Democratic, the Radical Democratic and the United People's Progressive Party created a coalition Union for Democracy. On 10 August it united with the People's Alliance and formed the Democratic Alliance. In the next few months grew the discontent within the Democratic and the Radical Democratic parties caused by the centralization of the organization and its conversion into a single party and in the beginning of 1924 many of their members left the Alliance and reestablished the two parties.

During its existence there were three distinct groups within the alliance, which often clashed with one another:

- The faction led by Andrey Lyapchev included former members of the Democratic and Radical parties. It was the dominant wing of the party after 1926. Following Lyapchev's death in 1933 and the 1934 coup, the Democratic Alliance split into two:
  - The faction led by Stoycho Moshanov and Radi Vasilev supported and joined the monarchist governments. In the summer of 1944 Moshanov was tasked with negotiating an armistice with the Allies.
  - The faction led by Georgi Danailov and Grigor Vasilev was in opposition to the monarchist government and joined the Committee of Five (Petorka). In the 1938 election the Petorka won 41 seats, with two going to the Vasilev led DA faction. The faction dissolved after the outbreak of WW2.
- The faction led by Aleksandar Tsankov included former members of the People's Alliance. It was the dominant wing of the party until early 1926, when Tsankov's harsh authoritarian measures led to the other factions forcing his resignation. Following the 1931 Bulgarian parliamentary election, they split off into the nazi-inspired National Social Movement in 1932. Following the 1934 coup it further split in two:
  - The faction led by Ivan Rusev and Hristo Kalfov supported the monarchist government.
  - The faction of the party led by Aleksandar Tsankov was initially opposed to the monarchist regime, but eventually joined it. After several attempts to become the sole ruling party, it left the government and went into opposition.
- The faction led by Atanas Burov included former members of the United People's Progressive Party. It was the smallest faction and often sided with either of the larger ones. Following the 1934 coup and the ban of all political parties, they split off from the alliance and remained in opposition to the monarchist government. The party won one seat in the 1938 election. and in the last days of WW2, joined the democratic government of Konstantin Muraviev, which was overthrown in the 1944 coup.

== Participation in the government ==
- Second government of Aleksandar Tsankov (22 September 1923 — 4 January 1926) - in coalition with the Bulgarian Workers' Social Democratic Party
- First government of Andrey Lyapchev (4 January 1926 — 12 September 1928) - alone
- First government of Andrey Lyapchev (12 September 1928 — 15 May 1930) - alone
- First government of Andrey Lyapchev (15 May 1930 — 29 June 1931) - in coalition with the National Liberal Party

== Leaders ==
- 1923-1926: Aleksandar Tsankov
- 1926-1933: Andrey Lyapchev

== Sources ==
- Ташев, Ташо. Министрите на България 1879-1999. София, АИ "Проф. Марин Дринов" / Изд. на МО, 1999. ISBN 978-954-430-603-8 / ISBN 978-954-509-191-9.
