= Radical Democratic Party (Bulgaria) =

Political party in Bulgaria

Radical Democratic Party Радикалдемократическа партия
- Founder: Naičo Canov
- Founded: 1902/1905
- Split from: Democratic Party
- Headquarters: Sofia, Bulgaria
- Newspaper: Demokrat; Radikal; Demokraticheski pregled
- Ideology: Liberalism; Radicalism
- National affiliation: Constitutional Bloc (1922–1923); Democratic Alliance (1923–1924); United Democratic Forces (1997–2005); Blue Coalition (2009–2012); Blue Bulgaria (2024–)
- International affiliation: International Entente of Radical and Similar Democratic Parties; Liberal International (1994–1996)

Website
- https://www.rdp-bg.org/

The Radical Democratic Party (Bulgarian: Радикалдемократическа партия) is a liberal party in Bulgaria. The party was founded in 1902 (other sources: 1905) by Naičo Canov and other dissidents from the Democratic Party. From 1918 party was led by Stoyan Kosturkov. It was banned in 1934, revived in 1944 and again banned in 1949. In 1989 the party was re-established. It elected as its leader Elka Konstantinova. She was succeeded in 1994 by Aleksander Jordanov, and the party became an affiliated member of the Union of Democratic Forces. In 1995 the party split, with one faction remaining inside the Union of Democratic Forces, and another faction becoming an independent party. Though the party still exists, it lacks its former influence.

== Electoral results ==
=== Parliament ===
Election	Votes	%	Seats	+/-	Position
1902	–	–	6 / 189	▲6	Opposition
1903	–	–	0 / 169	▼6	Opposition
1908	8,041	1.7%	0 / 203	0	Opposition
April 1923	166,909	15.77%	0 / 245	▲0	Opposition
Part of Constitutional Bloc, which won 17 seats in total
November 1923	639,881	63.76%	0 / 247	▲0	Coalition
Part of Democratic Alliance, which won 200 seats in total
