= History of the Slovak language =

The Slovak language is a West Slavic language. Historically, it forms a dialect continuum with Czech. The written standard is based on the work of Ľudovít Štúr, published in the 1840s and codified in July 1843 in Hlboké.

== Theories about the origin ==
=== Older hypotheses and theories ===
==== Centrist hypothesis ====
The centrist hypothesis was popular in the 19th century when it played a positive role in the Slovak national movement. According to this theory, Slovak is the remnant of the Proto-Slavic language spoken in the Middle Danube region before the great migration of the Slavs. This hypothesis is based on Nestor's Primary Chronicle and was supported by Matej Bel and several notable members of the movement, like Pavel Jozef Šafárik, Anton Bernolák and Ľudovít Štúr. Most modern scholars oppose the opinion about the Slavic homeland being in the Middle Danube, but the theory was revived in the 20th century by the Russian linguist Oleg Trubachyov.

==== Nonhomogeneous origin ====
The theories about the nonhomogeneous origin of Slovak assume its late integration in the 13th to 14th centuries or even after the 16th century. They claim that the Proto-Slavic basis of Slovak emerged on the border of early Western, Southern and Eastern Slavic macro dialects or that Slovak emerged from early or late mixing of neighboring languages. A prominent Slovak linguist, Samuel Czambel (1856–1909), believed that Western Slovak dialects are derived from early Western Slavic, that Central Slovak dialects are remains of the South Slavic language area (Czechized over centuries) and that Eastern Slovak dialects come from Old Polish and Old Ukrainian. Samuil Bernstein supported a similar theory. István Kniezsa suggested a mixing of languages in today's Central Slovakia after the Mongol invasion of Europe and Ottoman wars, thus forming modern Central Slovak dialects. The opinion about the late integration is not compliant with the current state of knowledge about the development of Slovak dialects from Proto-Slavic.

==== Homogeneous origin ====
This theory was proposed in the interwar period by Czech linguists František Trávníček and Václav Vážný. Its proponents believed that Slovak and Czech emerged from a common Proto-Czech-Slovak (Proto-Czech). Trávníček explained unique features of Central Slovak dialects by later differentiation, Vážný, by expansion from the south. Trávníček's attempt to explain the origin of Slovak from Proto-Czech-Slovak is now thought to be erroneous, and the creator of the theory abandoned it already after World War II.

=== Modern theories ===
Modern theories are based on a nonhomogeneous Proto-Slavic basis of Slovak. The prevailing theory is the migration-integration theory of Rudolf Krajčovič.

==== Migration-integration theory ====
Rudolf Krajčovič suggests three phases of development:

- post-migration period (5th–7th centuries): the Slavs came to present-day Slovakia from various locations; Western and Eastern Slovakia was settled by people who spoke Northwestern (West Slavic) Proto-Slavic dialect, Central Slovakia by speakers of the Southeastern (non-West Slavic) dialect.
- integration period (8th–9th centuries): several language features (both West and non-West Slavic) spread across the borders of the initial linguistic regions; these changes are best explained by the integration process of the Slavs before and during the existence of Great Moravia.
- constitutive period (10th–11th centuries): After the extinction of Proto-Slavic, Slovak began to evolve as a separate Slavic language.

==== Koine theory ====
This theory was proposed by a Slovak linguist Martin Pukanec. According to Pukanec, the migration-integration theory does not explain the presence of old isoglosses around Nitra, one main old political center. The main idea of the theory is koineization, a formation of a super-dialect (koiné) on the border of the West Slavic and the South Slavic dialects. The koineization on the border of two dialects may have been very rapid with many dramatic changes, possibly even two or three in one generation.

The author suggests the following chronology:

- an early integration period (6th century–833)
- koineization (833–907): The four phases of koineization correspond with the phases of development of Great Moravia.
- constitutive period (907–1110): The koiné was disintegrated, and the tribal system finally became extinct.

The arguments for this theory are mostly indirect.

== Emergence and development ==
=== Heterogenous Proto-Slavic basis of Slovak ===
The Proto-Slavic basis of Slovak included both West Slavic and Non-West Slavic features. Some West Slavic features are common for all Slovak dialects, but there are also Non-West Slavic features that are distributed over 70–75% of the territory. The Central Slovak dialects exhibit major deviations from what is generally thought of as West Slavic.

West Slavic features
Territorial distribution	Feature	Example	Comparison
common feature	preserved Proto-Slavic kv-, gv- before old Slavic ě	kvet, hviezda (flower, star)	Czech: květ, hvězda, Polish: kwiat, gwiazda vs. Serbian: cvet, zvezda, Russian: cvet, zvezd'a
common feature	missing epentetic l	zem (earth)	Czech: země, Polish: ziemia vs. Serbian: zemlja or Russian: zeml'a
common feature	c, dz instead of tj, dj	svieca, medza (candle, boundary)	Czech: svíce, mez, Polish: świeca, miedza vs. Serbian: sveća, međa, Russian: sveč'a, mež'a
mainly West and East, nowadays partly also the Central Slovakia	dl, tl preserved in nouns	šidlo (awl)	Czech: šídlo, Polish: szydło vs. Central Slovak dialects: šilo
mainly West and East, nowadays partly also the Central Slovakia	rot-, lot in place of Proto-Slavic ort-, olt-	rožen/rožeň, loket/lokec (grill, elbow)	Czech: loket, Polish: łokieć vs. Central Slovak dialects: lakeť
mainly West and East, nowadays partly also the Central Slovakia	š in place of Proto-Slavic ch'	Češi, ženíši (Czechs, bridegrooms)	Central Slovak dialects: Česi, ženísi
mainly West and East, nowadays partly also the Central Slovakia	and others		
only Záhorie (the westernmost region of Slovakia) and Eastern Slovakia	rъ, lъ in place of r̥, l̥	kref (blood – Proto-Slavic krъvь)	Czech: krev, Polish: krew vs. other Slovak dialects: krv
only Záhorie (the westernmost region of Slovakia) and Eastern Slovakia	suffix -ъmь in place of -omь	s hadem (with snake)	Czech: s hadem vs. other Slovak dialects: s hadom
only Záhorie	transformation iь > jь	jehua (needle)	Czech: jehla, Upper Sorbian: jehła vs. other Slovak dialects: ihla
only Záhorie	long vowels in place of old acutes	kráva (cow)	Czech: kráva vs. other Slovak dialects: krava
only Záhorie	short suffix -a in nominative plural of neutral grammatical gender	ramena (shoulders)	Czech: ramena vs. other Slovak dialects ramená

Non-West Slavic features
Territorial distribution	Feature	Example	Comparison
only the historic central area of Proto-Slavic basis of Slovak	simplified l instead of Proto-Slavic dl, tl	šilo (awl)	šilo, Russian: šilo vs. other Slovak dialects šidlo
only the historic central area of Proto-Slavic basis of Slovak	rat-, lat in place of Proto-Slavic ort-, olt-	lakeť (elbow)	lakat vs. other Slovak dialects loket, lokec
only the historic central area of Proto-Slavic basis of Slovak	s in place of Proto-Slavic ch'	Česi, ženísi (Czechs, bridegrooms)	other Slovak dialects Češi, ženíši
only the historic central area of Proto-Slavic basis of Slovak	preserved suffix -mo	nosímo ([we] bear)	Serbian: nosimo vs. other Slovak dialects nosíme
also outside of the historic central area of Proto-Slavic basis, but mainly in the neighbouring areas
also outside of the historic central area of Proto-Slavic basis, but mainly in the neighbouring areas	transformation iь > i	ihla (needle)	Serbian: igla, Russian: igla vs. jehua in Záhorie
also outside of the historic central area of Proto-Slavic basis, but mainly in the neighbouring areas	syllabic r̥, l̥ in words like kr̥v	krv (blood)	like Serbian: krv vs. Western and Eastern Slovak kref
also outside of the historic central area of Proto-Slavic basis, but mainly in the neighbouring areas	short vowels in the place of old acutes	krava (cow)	in Záhorie kráva
also outside of the historic central area of Proto-Slavic basis, but mainly in the neighbouring areas	long suffix -á in nominative plural of neutral grammatical gender	ramená (shoulders)	in Záhorie ramena, in Eastern Slovakia ramena (from the initial ramená)
also outside of the historic central area of Proto-Slavic basis, but mainly in the neighbouring areas	suffix -omь	s hadom ([with] snake)	in Záhorie s hadem

=== Main changes in the Proto-Slavic basis ===
In the 10th century, Proto-Slavic ceased to exist, and Slovak began to emerge as an independent language. The most important early changes were the contraction, the loss and vocalization of yers and the denasalization of ǫ and ę. These changes affected the word structure and phonemes. The loss of yers differentiated future Slovak, Czech and Polish from neighboring Slavic regions, and the denasalization differentiated Slovak and Czech from Polish. Slovak was not affected by old Polish dispalatization in the 10th century, causing differences between the two languages such as žena vs. Polish żona (a woman, a wife), kvet vs. Polish kwiat, etc. It was also not affected by the old Czech syllabic depalatization before hard syllables, with differences such as priateľ vs. Czech sg. přítel, pl. přátelé (a friend). Slovak preserved a difference between dz/z (from Proto-Slavic */dj/ */gtj/), i.e. medźa (medza, a boundary), vítäź (víťaz, an elite warrior, a winner) whereas both phonemes were transformed to ź in old Czech and dź in old Polish. Contrary to Czech, a vowel mutation from à to e did not occur in Slovak, i.e. ulica vs. Czech ulice (a street). The differences between Slovak and Czech like ťažko/těžko, cudzí/cizí became stable later. Slovak developed only single r in contrast with Czech pairs r/ř and Polish r/rz. Slovak evolved as an independent language already from the 10th century, and there is strong evidence against theories of its early or late formation from other languages. (Note: Yet in the 1970's, such opinion was presented by a prominent Hungarian historian György Györffy.)

==== Contraction ====
Contraction was a change caused by a loss of j between vowels and their merging into one long vowel, for example dobroje → dobré (good) and bojati sę → báť sa (to be afraid). The contraction originated in the territory of Great Moravia in the last years of its existence and divided the Slavic territory into contraction and non-contraction areas. In Proto-Slovak, the contraction occurred before the disappearance and vocalization of yers, but not uniformly. In later Western and Eastern Slovak dialects, the change was similar to other West Slavic languages. The Central Slovak shares some old features with the South-Slavic contraction peripheral territory. The Central Slovak preserved more non-contracted forms (i.e. moja, moje vs. má, mé, bojati sa /dialect/ vs báť sa). The different process of contraction oje → oe → ô probably resulted also to the characteristic neuter adjective ending -ô (i.e. dobrô vs. dobré).

==== Loss and vocalization of yers ====
The disappearance of weak yers and the change of strong yers is reconstructed by Havlík's law. The back yer (ъ) was vocalized as e in the Proto-Slavic basis of Western and Eastern Slovak (pętъkъ → pátek: Friday) and as o in the Central Slovak area (piatok). The weak yers did not disappear in one syllable words, but the back yer changed to a, and the front yer, to ä. This change occurred already in the 10th century like in other West Slavic languages, contrary to the neighboring East Slavic area.

==== Denasalization ====
The Proto-Slavic nasal vowels ǫ and ę were denasalized in the 10th century. The nasal vowel ǫ was replaced by u and ú, i.e. zǫbъ > zub (a tooth), lǫka > lúka (a meadow) probably through an extinct nasal vowel ų: ǫ > ų > u/ú. The denasalization of ę was similar: ę > ą̈ > ä/a̋. These forms from the 11th–12th centuries have been preserved in some Slovak dialects until the modern age (Orava, Gemer and Sotak dialects). The central Slovak dialects preserved only the short form ä. In other dialects, they changed into many different monophthongs and diphthongs.

=== Phonology ===
==== Changes in prosodic features ====
The Proto-Slavic quantity was associated with specific vowels (long a, u, i, y, ě, ę, ǫ vs. short o, e, ъ, ь). The original quantity has disappeared or changed, creating pairs of short and long vowels a/á, e/é, etc.

==== The spirantization of Slavic /g/ to /h/ ====
Early Slovak inherited the velar g from Proto-Slavic. The velar was preserved in the early stage of development, but it changed to h approximately in the 12th century. Unlike Czech, this change was not complete, and the original g has been preserved in the -zg consonant group at the end of words and on the border of morphemes, e.g. mozgy vs. Czech mozky (brains). The partial preservation of g in the phonetic system allowed Slovak to adopt g in later loanwords, for example gombík (a button).

=== Morphology ===
==== Grammatical numbers ====
In contrast to modern Slovak, early Slovak had three grammatical numbers inherited from Proto-Slavic, singular, plural and dual. Dual was probably never fully developed and was extinct already in the 14th century. Dual forms were recorded mostly in documents from Western and partially from Central Slovakia, but their usage in the 15th–16th centuries was limited to words that naturally come in pairs (ears, eyes, etc.) and words derived from the number two. However, they were already garbled or outnumbered by plural forms.

==== Grammatical tenses ====
Simplification of grammatical tenses had been an overall trend in the development of Slovak. Old Proto-Slavic past tenses, the aorist, the imperfect and the old pluperfect disappeared, probably in the 13th–14th centuries. The perfect and the new pluperfect become stable. Different expressions for the future tense were simplified in one stable form, e.g. mám/chcu/začnu/budu robiti → budu robiti, later budem robiť (I will do).

==== Noun declension ====
Unlike neighbouring Slavic languages, Slovak retained only six out of seven Proto-Slavic grammatical cases. The vocative merged with the nominative, but it has been preserved in archaic forms of some words related to family, e.g. otec → otče, syn → synu, kmotor → kmotre (O father/son/godfather) and to address God: Boh → Bože, Ježiš → Ježišu, Kristus → Kriste (O God/Jesus/Christ). Slovak retained basic principles of declension, but the evolution of declension paradigms had been strongly affected by the principle of analogy: less frequent declension suffixes were replaced by more frequent suffixes from other cases and paradigms. The outcome of this process was simplification and higher uniformity of declension patterns. This process was more intense compared to Czech. The independent development of Slovak naturally resulted in unique declension patterns.

== History of standard language ==
=== Pre-standard period ===
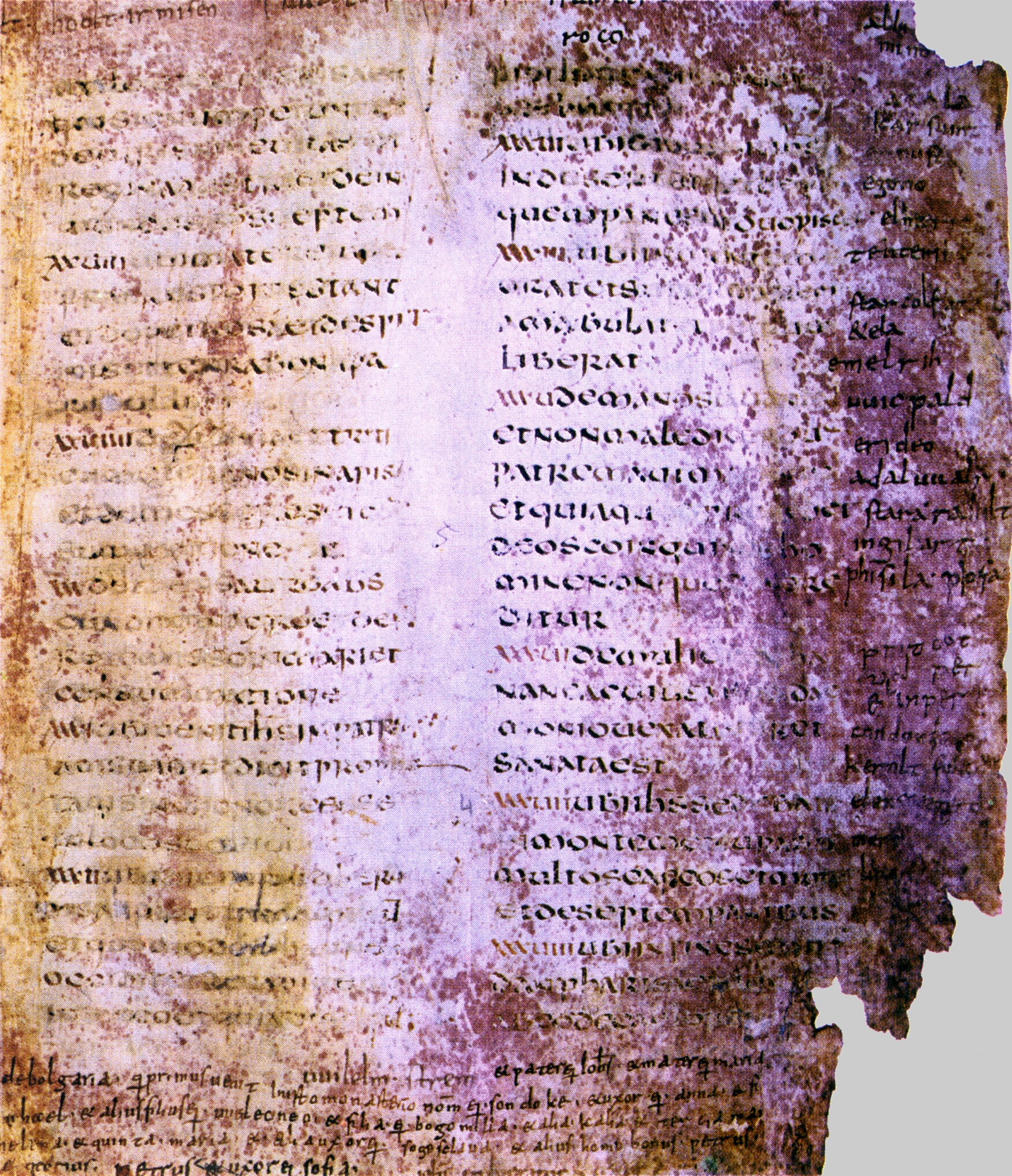
The Gospel of Cividale. The names of Great Moravian pilgrims (often composed of several stems) is one of the sources of information about pre-Slovak lexemes.

The earliest written records of Slovak are represented by personal and place names, later by sentences, short notes and verses in Latin and Czech documents. Latin documents contain also mentions about a cultivation of the vernacular language. The complete texts are available since the 15th century. In the 15th century, Latin began to lose its privileged position in favor of Czech and cultural Slovak.

==== Early pre-standard period ====
===== Old Church Slavonic =====
The Old Church Slavonic became the literary and liturgical language, and the Glagolitic alphabet the corresponding script in Great Moravia until 885. Latin continues to be used in parallel. Some of the early Old Church Slavonic texts (based on emerging southern Slavic dialects) contain western Slavic elements of the language of the Slavic inhabitants of Great Moravia and Pannonia, which were called the Sloviene (*Slověne) by Slavic texts at that time. The use of Old Church Slavonic in Great Moravia was prohibited by Pope Stephen V in 885; consequently, Latin became the administrative and liturgical language again. Many followers and students of Constantine and Methodius fled to Bulgaria, Croatia, Bohemia, the Kievan Rus' and other countries.

==== Older and younger pre-standard period ====
===== Slovak in Latin documents =====
From the 10th century onward, Slovak began to develop independently. Very few written records of Old Slovak remain, mainly from the 13th century onwards, consisting of groups of words or single sentences. Fuller Slovak texts appeared starting from 15th century. Old Slovak and its development can be researched mainly through old Slovak toponyms occurring in Latin texts. Examples include crali (1113) > kráľ, 'king'; dorz (1113) > dvorec, 'court'; grinchar (1113) > hrnčiar, 'potter'; mussenic (1113) > mučeník, 'martyr'; scitar (1113) > štítar, 'shieldmaker'; zaltinc (1156) > zlatník, 'goldmaker'; duor (1156) > dvor, 'courtyard'; and otroč (1156) > otrok, 'slave, servant'. In 1294, the monk Ivanka from Kláštor pod Znievom wrote: "ad parvam arborem nystra slowenski breza ubi est meta". It is important mainly because it contains the oldest recorded adjective Slovak in Slovak, whose modern form is slovensky. Up until this point, all adjectives were recorded mainly in Latin, including sclavus, slavus and sclavoniae.

Table: Examples of Slovakisms in Latin documents
Latin	Slovakisms
...in piscina, que vocatur Mortva... De villa Boencza sive in silva in terra, quantum habent castellani Golgociesis, tantum habet sanctus Ypolitus. De Locupolt inca nunc due incunta in aqua Vvac... De villa Vvederat, in villa Dobet est quendam aqua, que vocatur Dumbo.... (1111)	Toponymes Mrtvá, Bojnice, Glogovec (Hlohovec), Koplot(ovce), Vag (Váh), Voderad(y), Dobräta, Dǫ(bova).
...in fluvium Lubula..., inde tendit circa magnum Gozd et valit ad pratum ad arborem jauor cruce signata(m) et ipse arbor dividit a terra populorum Maioris Paluga et Minoris. Deinde ascendit ad unum berech et vadit ad arborem scemerek cruce signata(m) (1284)	Toponymes Ľubeľa, Paludza, nature-related nouns gvozd (deep forest), breh (river bank), javor (maple), smrek (spruce)
...ad parvam arborem nystra slowenski breza ubi est meta... (1294)	slovensky breza (in Slovak breza /birch/)

===== Czech and Slovakized Czech =====
Written Czech started to penetrate into present-day Slovakia through Czech clergy teaching in capitular schools in the 14th century. In the pre-standard period, Czech was used along with Latin and cultural Slovak as a cultural and liturgical language. The reasons for the use of Czech were the absence of a uniform Slovak standard due to the absence of a Slovak state, whereas Czech was a standardized language which enjoyed a certain degree of prestige, particularly in the context of the Protestant Reformation; the rise of the Slovak population in towns; the similarity to Slovak making it easier to learn; studies of many Slovaks at the University of Prague; the influence of the campaigns of the Czech Hussites and of John Giskra (Ján Jiskra) in Upper Hungary; and the temporary conquest of Moravia by the Hungarian king Matthias Corvinus.

The usage of Czech in a Slovak environment resulted in Slovakized Czech, a variant of cultural Czech with Slovak elements. This variant existed from the penetration of Czech to present-day Slovakia and was used in city books and official correspondence. Early writings had a varying frequency of Slovak elements caused by a poor knowledge of standard Czech among many Slovak native speakers and the influence of vernacular language and cultural Slovak. The normalized form of Slovakized Czech existed from the 17th century. In it, Czech letters and words were systematically replaced by their Slovak equivalents (e.g. ř by r, ě by e, au by ú, ou by ú, etc.).

Table: Example of early Slovakized Czech (a religious song, the 14th century)
Slovakized Czech

Vitaj milý Spasiteľu,
všeho světa stvořiteľu.
Vitaj milý Jezu Christe,
jakž sě počal z dievky čistej.
Vitaj svaté božie cělo,
jak si na svatem križu pnelo,
pro člověče spasenie.
...
ráč mi popríci cěla svého
před skončením života mého,
aby odpudil všú moc diabelskú
a dal mi radost nebeskú.
...

Slovakisms
- missing Czech change -u → -i (e.g. spasiteľu/saviour)
- inconsistent usage of the Czech letter ř (e.g. stvořiteľu/saviour, but popríci/to deny)
- the ending -ú instead of Czech -ou (e.g. diabelskú/diabolic, nebeskú/heavenly)
- and others.

===== Biblical Czech =====
Czech was recognized as an official language of the Lutheran Church by the councils in 1610 and 1614 and was used as a liturgical language even until the early 20th century. The official form was biblical Czech used in the Czech Bible of Kralice. The orthography of Hussite "Brothers in the Law of Christ" was used also in Catholic publications but often adjusted to cultural Slovak.

===== Kollár's "Old Slovak" =====
Slovak humanist Ján Kollár and Andrej Ľudovít Radlinský attempted to standardize a new standard language called Old Slovak (staroslovenčina), a version of Slovakized Czech. According to the contemporary Pan-Slavic views, the Slavic nation consisted of four tribes, the Czechoslovak, the Polish, the Russian and the Illyrian (Southern Slavs). Kollár assumed a common origin of Czechs and Slovaks. The original language, he claimed, is closer to Slovak, with Czech allegedly losing its beauty due to contact with German. After the suppressing of the Hungarian Revolution of 1848, Kollár got an approval of the government in Vienna to use "Old Slovak" as an administrative and educational language. The trial to create a common standard language for Czechs and Slovaks failed. Czechs had difficulties understanding Kollár's "improvements" of Czech by Slovakisms, and the younger Slovak generation preferred standardization of Slovak.

===== Cultural Western, Central and Eastern Slovak =====
Catholics use Western Slovak (Cultured Western Slovak, Jesuit Slovak) based on the language used by educated people from the region of Trnava, where the important Jesuit University of Trnava was founded in 1635, and in the profane sphere, especially in towns, Slovak influenced by the Czech is used even in written documents, often with a chaotic orthography.

My fojt Gal i boženíci, mister Andreas, Benediktus Nozer, Martin Messer, Zighel a jinší boženici vyznavame všem, ktož toto bude čisti a neb čtuce uslyše, [...] I jest nam Boh pomohol, že jsme učinili uplnou umlovu z Niklošem Polakem i z jeho synen Martinem a Miklošem Noskem a dal jest nam Polak summu penez 67 zlatych v zlate uhorskej vahy za ty všicky braky tisove, co mali činiti z bratrem našim z Hanesom Frolichem a o jinše všicky veci, což mali v jedno činiti. [...] A dale my Peter Frulych a Peter Fyuger zlubujeme Polakovi 16 zl. zastupiti od Gloza s Tešina, tak, že ma Polak teho prazen byti.

— The Law Book of Žilina, an example of medieval cultural Slovak, this text, dated to 1473, is possibly the oldest document written in a Slovak language. (1451)

After the defeat of the Turks near Vienna in 1683, many Slovaks gradually emigrated to the Lower Lands, territories in present-day Hungary, Serbia (later to Croatia and Bulgaria), and Romania was depopulated after the Turkish occupation. They have preserved their particular Slovak dialects until today. In eastern Slovakia, a Slovakized standard Polish is used sometimes (besides Czech, Slovak and Latin) for the same purposes and reasons as Czech is used in the remaining Slovakia. Latin continues to be used, especially in state administration.

Efforts to establish Slovak as the standard language emerged as early as in the 17th century. For example, in The Czech Grammar (1603), Vavrinec Benedikt of Nedožery incites the Slovaks to deepen their knowledge of Slovak. Matej Bel in the introduction to the Gramatica Slavico-Bohemica (1745) of Pavel Doležal compares Slovak with other recognized languages. Literary activity in Slovak flourished during the second half of the seventeenth century and continued into the next century. In the mid-18th century Camaldolese monks translated the Bible in a variant of language named after them, while Romuald Hadvabný of Červený Kláštor proposed a detailed (Western Slovak) language codification in his Latin-Slovak Dictionary (1763) with an outline of the Slovak grammar. The first adventure novel in Slovak, the René mláďenca príhodi a skúsenosťi, was published in 1783 by Jozef Ignác Bajza in Western Slovak.

=== Standard period ===
==== Bernolák's standard ====
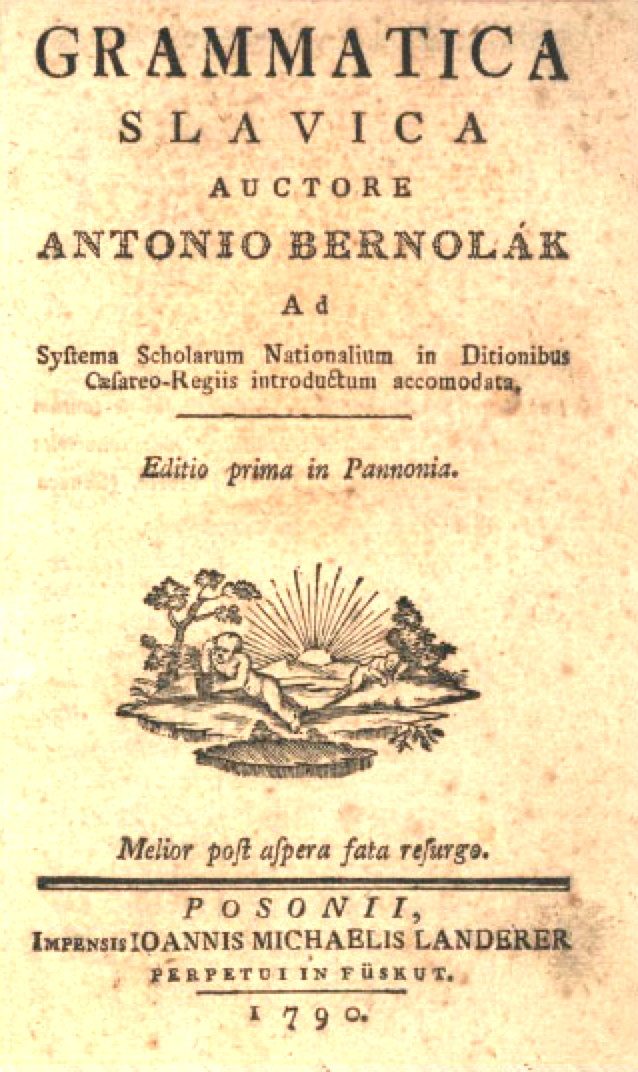
Grammatica Slavica (Slovak Grammar) by Anton Bernolák (1790).

Anton Bernolák, a Catholic priest (1762–1813), published the Dissertatio philologico-critica de litteris Slavorum in 1787, in which he codified a Slovak standard based on the Western Slovak of the University of Trnava but contains also some central Slovak elements, e.g. soft consonants ď, ť, ň, ľ and many words. The orthography is strictly diacritical. The language is often called Bernolák's language. Bernolák continued his codification work in other books in the 1780s and 1790s and especially in his huge six-volume Slovak-Czech-Latin-German-Hungarian Dictionary, in print from 1825 to 1927. In the 1820s, the Bernolák standard was revised, and Central Slovak elements were systematically replaced by their Western Slovak equivalents.

This was the first successful establishment of a standard Slovak. Bernolák's language was used by Slovak Catholics, especially by the writers Juraj Fándly and Ján Hollý, but Protestants still wrote in Czech in its old form used in Bohemia until the 17th century.

==== Štúr's standard ====
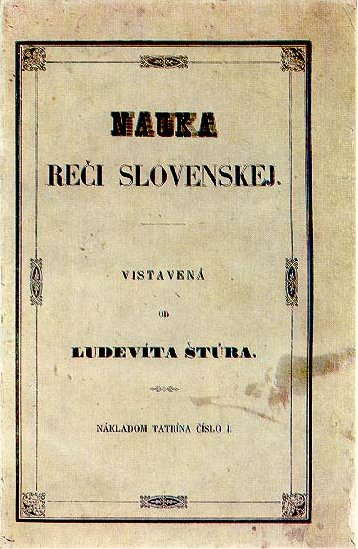
Nauka reči Slovenskej (The Theory of Slovak) by Ľudovít Štúr (1846).

In 1843, young Slovak Lutheran Protestants, led by Ľudovít Štúr, decided to establish and discuss the central Slovak dialect as the new Slovak standard instead of both Bernolák's language used by the Catholics and Czech used by older Slovak Lutheran Protestants. The new standard was also accepted by some users of Bernolák's language led by Ján Hollý, but was initially criticized by the older Lutheran Protestants led by Ján Kollár (died 1852). This language formed the basis of the later standard Slovak that is used today. The first Slovak grammar of the new language was published by Ľudovít Štúr in 1846 with the title Nauka reči Slovenskej (The Theory of the Slovak Language).

In 1844, the Hungarian Diet of Pozsony (today Bratislava) replaced Latin, used since the Middle Ages, with Hungarian as the official language of Hungary, which included at the time what later became Slovakia.

==== Hodža-Hattala reform ====
In 1851, the supporters of Bernolák and Štúr made a compromise and agreed on the reform of the Štúr's standard. The new standard respected etymological principles instead of Štúr's phonetic-phonological transcription and used a Slovak orthography closer to other Slavic languages, especially Czech. The new grammar was published by Martin Hattala in 1852.

==== Martin period, practice and Czambel's codification ====
The Martin period lasted from the abolishment of the Slovak national and cultural institution Matica slovenská until the foundation of Czechoslovakia in 1918. The name comes from Turčiansky Svätý Martin, the contemporary Slovak cultural center. The usage of Slovak in education and culture was significantly reduced during forced Magyarization after the Austro-Hungarian Compromise of 1867.

The Martin practice (Slovak: martinský úzus) was a de facto standard partially formed already before the abolishment of Matica and influenced by the dialect spoken in Martin. In 1902, Samuel Czambel published new language standard. Czambel's codification favored the forms used in spoken language to archaisms from Hattala's codification and synchronized spoken and written language. Czambel's codification was partially revised and extended by Jozef Škultéty.

==== Czechoslovakia (1918–1939) ====
With the establishment of Czechoslovakia in 1918, Slovak became an official language for the first time in history along with Czech. The Czechoslovak Constitution of 1920 and the constitutional law on minorities which was adopted alongside the constitution on the same day established the Czechoslovak language as an official language Since the Czechoslovak language did not exist, the law recognized its two variants, Czech and Slovak. Czech was usually used in administration in the Czech lands; Slovak, in Slovakia. In practice, the position of languages was not equal. Along with political reasons, this situation was caused by a different historical experience and numerous Czech teachers and clerks in Slovakia, who helped to restore the educational system and administration because Slovaks educated in Slovak were missing.

In 1931, the Matica slovenská published a new standard Slovak prepared by Czech linguist Václav Vážný, the head of the Department of Linguistics of Matica. In contrast with older works including those published in Czechoslovakia, the standard had an official character and was approved and recommended by the Ministry of Education led by Slovak minister Ivan Dérer. The standard was inspired by the official ideology of Czechoslovakism and tried to align both languages by the codification of numerous Czech words and forms not existing in Slovak. It raised negative reactions, and the board of Matica promised its revision. Although a new official standard was not published before the breakup of Czechoslovakia in 1939, a new standard of Matica was used along with Vážný's standard.

==== Slovak Spelling Reform in the 1953 ====
A major reform of Slovak spelling took place in 1953 with the publication of new Rules of Slovak Orthography, which came into force in 1954. The reform aimed to simplify and standardize spelling and bring it closer to pronunciation. One important change was replacing older past-tense endings such as -ly with -li (e.g. ženy robily, deti boly changed to ženy robili, deti boli.). Rules for prefixes and prepositions such as s-/z- were also revised.

==== Czechoslovakia (1959–1992) ====
The six-volume Slovník slovenského jazyka (Slovak Dictionary, SSJ) was written during 1959–1968. The federalization of Czechoslovakia in 1968 confirmed equal rights for Slovak and Czech in the Socialist Republic of Czechoslovakia and later the Fifth Republic of Czechoslovakia.

==== Slovak Republic ====
Czechoslovakia split into Slovakia and the Czech Republic in 1993. Slovak became the official language of Slovakia.

== See also ==
- Slovak literature
- History of the Czech language
