= Polog and its Bulgarian Population =

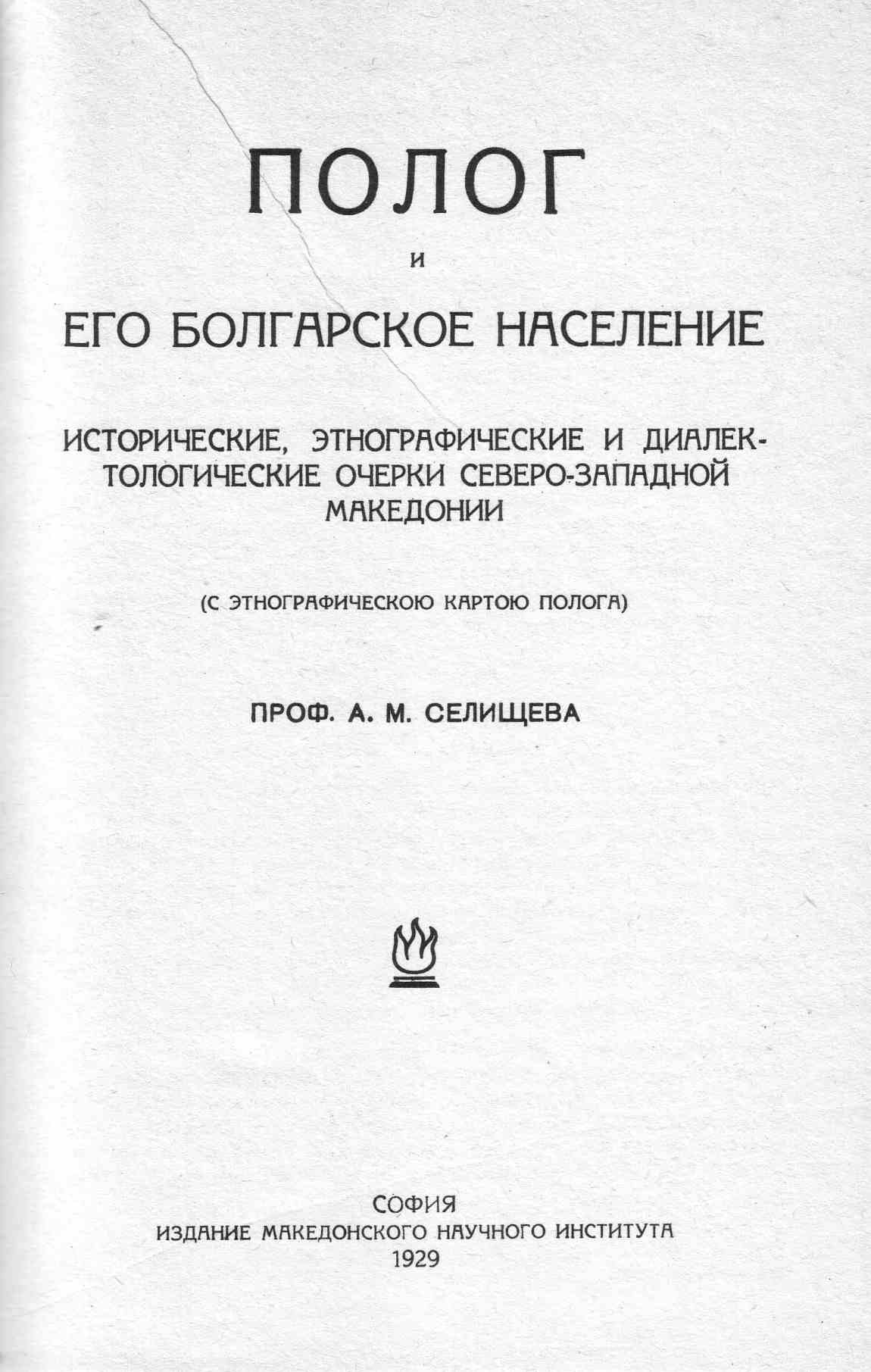
- First edition cover (1929)
- Author: Afanasiy Selishchev
- Original title: Полог и его болгарское население
- Language: Russian
- Genre: History, ethnography, linguistics
- Publisher: Macedonian Scientific Institute
- Publication date: 1929
- Publication place: Bulgaria
- Pages: 439
- OCLC: 181145100

Polog and its Bulgarian Population (Russian: Полог и его болгарское население, romanized: Polog i yego bolgarskoye naseleniye) is a scientific book by the Russian linguist Afanasiy Selishchev, published in Russian in 1929 in Sofia, Bulgaria.

Bulgarian linguists use the book as proof that the standard Macedonian language originated as a dialect of Bulgarian. Macedonian researchers dispute the book's objectivity, accusing Lyubomir Miletich of using institutional funding to influence the work and financially motivate the author to change his original writings.

== Overview ==
In 1918, Selishchev published the work Ocherki po makedonskoy dialektologii, tom I (Essays on Macedonian dialectology, Vol. 1). Bulgarian slavists tried to convince Selishchev to change the work's name to "Essays on Macedonian dialectology of the Bulgarian language", but they failed. In the same year, Selishchev prepared a second volume of the work "Essays on the Macedonian dialectology", which focused on the dialects of northwestern Macedonia. However, his original handwritten manuscript was lost while he was working in Irkutsk.

In May 1922, he sent the first volume of his work to the Bulgarian academic Lyubomir Miletich. In a January 1927 letter, he mentioned that had finished his book about Polog. The next year, he started communicating with Lyubomir Miletich. Meanwhile, when Selishchev finished his book on Polog, his book "Introduction to the Study of Slavic Languages" (Russian: Введение в изучение славянских языков, Vvedenie v izuchenie slavyanskih yazikov) which was supposed to be printed by the Bulgarian Academy of Sciences was returned after sitting there unpublished for four years, which Miletich explained that it was due to financial difficulities. Selishchev wrote that he felt depressed about that, which affected his work on Polog, which he planned to "revise", and cancelled the printing. Miletich then suggested that the second volume of his work could instead be printed by the Macedonian Scientific Institute in Bulgaria, which Selishchev accepted.

In a letter from February 1928, Miletich wrote that he had prepared the first draft for the ethnographic introduction to dialectology and suggested that Selishchev make a map, directly intervening in his work. Following the requests for revisions and additions to the work, Miletich included a financially motivating sentence: "the Institute is going to grant you a decent fee for the publication". In September 1928, Miletich received the map, but requested Selishchev to make further changes in it, namely replacing the term "Slavs" with "Bulgarian Slavs of Macedonia" or "Macedonian Bulgarians", and to include the terms in the text too. In the letter from November 1928, Miletich again sent a request to Selishchev, this time to name the map "Macedonian Bulgarians in Tetovo", and the term "Macedonian Slavs" to remain in the text only in certain cases. This demonstrates that in Selishchev's initial work, he used the term "Slavs" and did not intend to use the term "Bulgarians". In April 1929, Miletich received the new version of the work by Selishchev, which was revised according to the instructions of Miletich. Miletich wrote that the work was now "in tight relationship with the goals of the Institute". However, Miletich again requested changes, this time in the title, where he requested the title "Polog" to be changed with "Bulgarian population in Polog, Tetovo and Gostivar region", and the name "Essays..." as subtitle. In the letter, Miletich again reminds Selishchev and guarantees him that he is going to be paid the agreed fee. In undated letter from 1929 (most likely July), Miletich again requests Selishchev to change the term "Slavs" with "Bulgarians" in the map as he did in the text.

In December 1929, the book was finally published. In January 1930, Miletich informed Selishchev that he sent copies of the book to Slavic and other international university libraries, and to Slavists from other countries. In May 1930, Miletich wrote that the fee which Selishchev is going to receive was 48,870 Bulgarian levs (≈$6,562). After the publication, Selishchev was also elected as corresponding member of the Bulgarian Academy of Sciences.

The work, subtitled Historical, Ethnographic, and Dialectological Sketches of Northwestern Macedonia, is considered a fundamental study of the Polog region. Selishchev began collecting materials for the book in 1914. His research covers a wide range of topics, including the history, geography, and natural environment of the region, as well as the daily life, spiritual culture, and dialects of the local population.

The book includes a detailed ethnographic map of Polog and provides extensive data on the Slavic dialects of the area, which Selishchev identifies as Bulgarian.

== Legacy ==
Almost a century after its publication, Bulgarian linguists still use the book as proof that the standard Macedonian language originated as a dialect of Bulgarian. Selishchev is the author of the article on the Bulgarian language in the 1927 edition of the Great Soviet Encyclopedia, in which he also included the Macedonian dialects. According to Selishchev's student and colleague Samuil Bernstein, initially he considered the Macedonian dialects to be part of the Bulgarian language and sharply criticized the Serbianizing concept of Aleksandar Belić. However, according to Bernstein, he objected when political conclusions regarding territorial affiliation were drawn from his theories in Bulgaria. Bernstein wrote that subsequently, in 1938, Selishchev mentioned Macedonian as a separate language. Bernstein's diary led to the discovery of letters sent by Lyubomir Miletich to Selishchev, which were found in the Russian state archives in 2024 by Macedonian researchers Branislav Svetozarevikj, Dragan Jakjoski, and Marija Tretjakova. The letters sent from Selishchev to Miletich have not been found, as they are believed to have been destroyed along with Miletich's personal archive during the allied bombing of Sofia in 1944. According to the Macedonian researchers, the fee paid by Miletich was a bribe to influence Selishchev's original work, where he replaced the term "Slavs" with "Bulgarians", "Macedonian Bulgarians" and "Bulgarian Slavs of Macedonia" in the title, map, and the text, to fit the Bulgarian agenda, and to convince the European linguists that a Russian linguist wrote about Lower Polog dialect being part of the Bulgarian language. According to Bernstein, the book was originally intended to be titled "Essays on Macedonian Dialectology", Vol. II. As early as 1925, Selishchev referred to his work "Polog" as the second volume of "Essays on Macedonian Dialectology". The title was changed at the request of Miletich. Selishchev acceded to Miletich’s wish, as the new work was not, in fact, an organic continuation of the first volume of "Essays on Macedonian Dialectology".

== See also ==
- Eastern South Slavic
- Political views on the Macedonian language
- Macedonian historiography

== Bibliography ==
- Svetozarevikj, Branislav; Jakjoski, Dragan (2024). Писма од Љубомир Милетич до Афанасиј М. Селишчев (историја на една мистификација) [Letters from Lyubomir Miletich to Afanasij M. Selishchev (History of a Mystification)] (in Macedonian). Skopje: State Archives of the Republic of North Macedonia. ISBN 978-608-4900-45-0.
