= Camaldolese Slovak =

Variant of cultural Slovak language

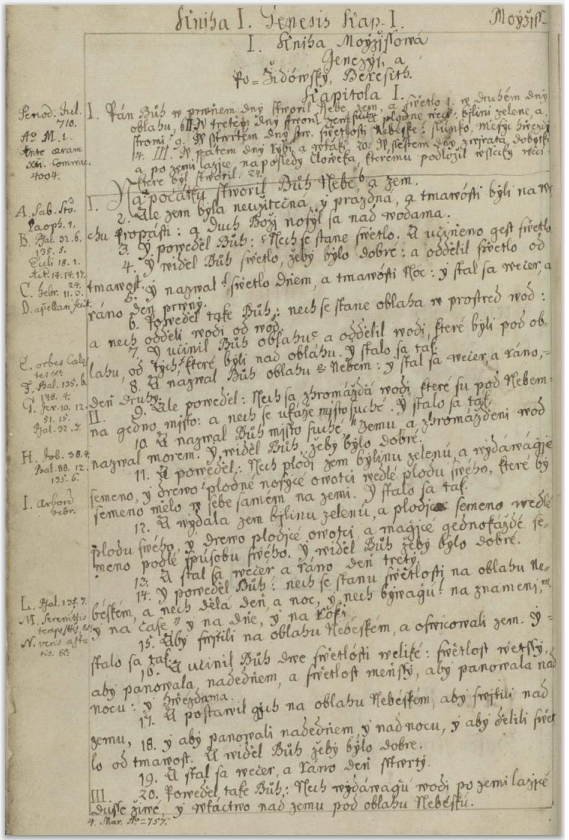
First page of the Genesis book, Kamaldul Slovak bible translation.

Camaldolese Slovak (Kamaldulská slovenčina) is a variant of cultural Slovak language (its Western variant) and can be called first attempt at creating standardized Slovak language. It is named after order of Camaldolese, which are credited as creators of at least two known books in this language:

- Písma Swaté Biblie Slowenské aneb Písma Swatého částka I-II (so called Camaldolese Bible; before 1756, found in edition from between year 1756-1759) - first known translation of whole Bible to Slovak language, stored in archbishops archives in Trnava.
- Syllabus dictionarij latino-slavonicus... (Hadbavý dictionary or Camaldolese Dictionary; 1763) - Latin-Slovak dictionary, 948 pages, stored in University library in Budapest.

In older literature, the authorship of both of these works are credited to Romauld Hadbavý, who was at the time abbot of the kamaldul order, or the monks from Červený kláštor. This is not considered certain however, as the type of language used in these works seems more akin to that of the kamaldul monks from Zobor monastery in Nitra (which lies in western Slovakia, as opposed to the eastern part).

It is expected, that much more works and translations has been made by the monks.
