= Slavic Population in Albania =

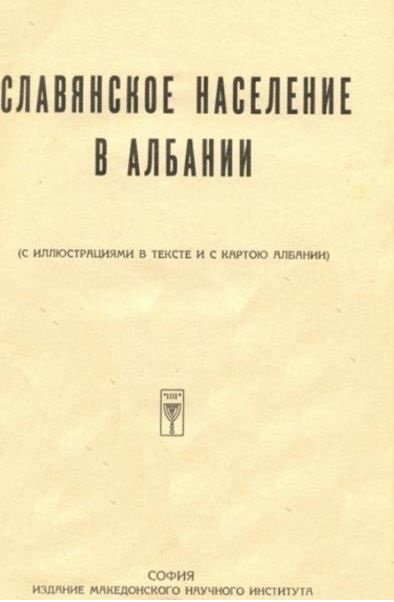
- Cover of the 1931 edition
- Author: Afanasiy Selishchev
- Original title: Славянское население в Албании
- Language: Russian
- Genre: Linguistics, History, Ethnography
- Publisher: Macedonian Scientific Institute
- Publication date: 1931
- Publication place: Sofia, Bulgaria
- Pages: 352

Slavic Population in Albania (Russian: Славянское население в Албании) is a scholarly work by the Russian linguist Afanasiy Selishchev, published in Sofia in 1931 by the Macedonian Scientific Institute. The book is considered a pioneering study on Slavic toponymy and the historical presence of Slavs in modern-day Albania.

== Overview ==
The work is the result of Selishchev's extensive research into Balkan linguistics and history. The main focus areas of the book include:

- Toponymy: A detailed analysis of hundreds of local names (villages, rivers, mountains) with Slavic origins in Central and Southern Albania.
- Ethnography: Descriptions of the customs, folklore, and material culture of the region.
- Linguistics: An investigation into the mutual influences between the Albanian language and Slavic dialects.

Selishchev identified the Slavic etymology of numerous important settlements, including Pogradec, Korçë (from Goritsa), Çorovodë (from Cherna voda), Berat (from Belgrad), Belsh, Librazhd, and Konispol (from Konopishte).

== Significance ==
In his study, Selishchev classified the Slavic dialects in these regions as part of the Bulgarian linguistic group, aligning with the scientific positions of the Macedonian Scientific Institute at the time. The book remains an indispensable source for Albanology, Balkan studies, and Slavic studies regarding the medieval history and demography of the region.

The work has been widely cited by international scholars for its comprehensive analysis of Balkan linguistic contacts. Despite the historical and political context of its publication, Selishchev's toponymic reconstructions are still regarded as highly accurate and scientifically valuable by modern linguists.

== See also ==
- Polog and its Bulgarian Population
- Bulgarians in Albania
- Macedonians in Albania
