= Nikola Stoyanov =

Nikola Stoyanov L.d'H. CC
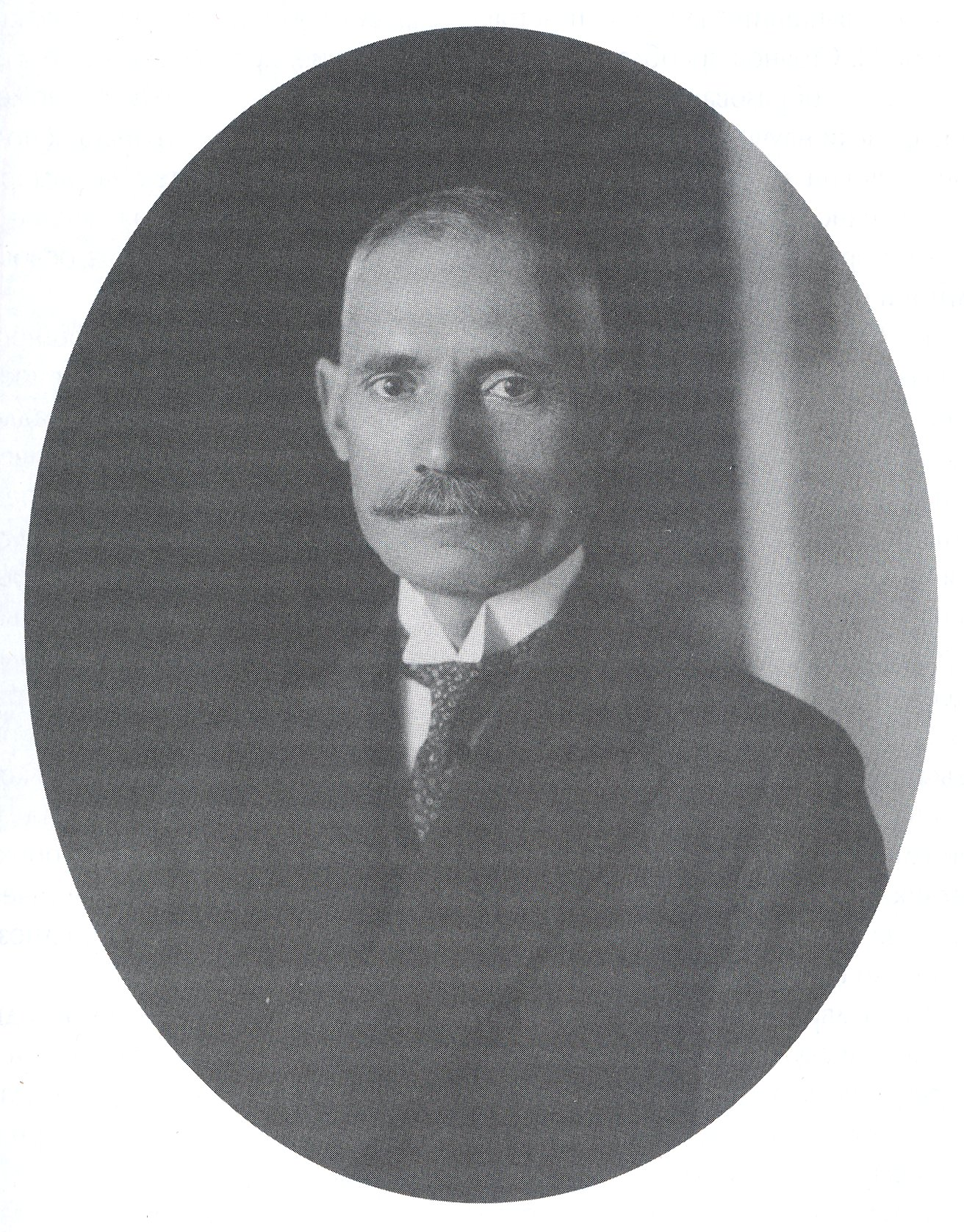
- Born: February 3, 1874; Dojran, Ottoman Empire (today North Macedonia
- Died: June 12, 1967 (aged 93); Sofia, Bulgaria

Academic background
- Education: Sofia University
- Influences: Vilfredo Pareto, Clément Juglar

Nikola Stoyanov Mitov (Bulgarian: Никола Стоянов Митов; February 3, 1874 – June 12, 1967) was a Bulgarian scientist, economist and financier. He was in charge of the Bulgarian Government Debt Directorate for much of the interwar period and as such, he led the prolonged negotiations over the country's foreign debt. The agreements helped stabilise the country's national currency and contributed to the economic growth Bulgaria experienced prior to World War II. Between 1929 and 1944, Stoyanov was editor-in-chief of the authoritative journal of the Bulgarian Economic Society. He was also a prominent member of various organisations of Macedonian immigrants to Bulgaria and one of the founders of the Macedonian Scientific Institute, as well as its chairman between 1938 and 1945. Stoyanov was the first Bulgarian author whose scientific work on astronomy was published abroad.

== Early years ==
Nikola Stoyanov was born on February 3, 1874, in the town of Dojran (today in North Macedonia). His father was a prominent citizen and for a certain period mayor of the town. Following the end of the Russo-Turkish war of 1877–78 and the subsequent Treaty of Berlin, Dojran remained outside the newly established Principality of Bulgaria. This prompted Stoyanov's family to emigrate and settle down in the new Bulgarian capital Sofia in 1880.

In 1892, Nikola Stoyanov graduated from the First Sofia Men's Gymnasium. Although his initial desire was to study engineering abroad, Stoyanov received a state scholarship for the “Higher School” (today St. Clement of Ohrid University of Sofia), where he entered the physics and mathematics department. He graduated in 1895 and started work as a teacher, initially in Vidin and later on in the First Sofia Men's Gymnasium.

== Scientific career ==
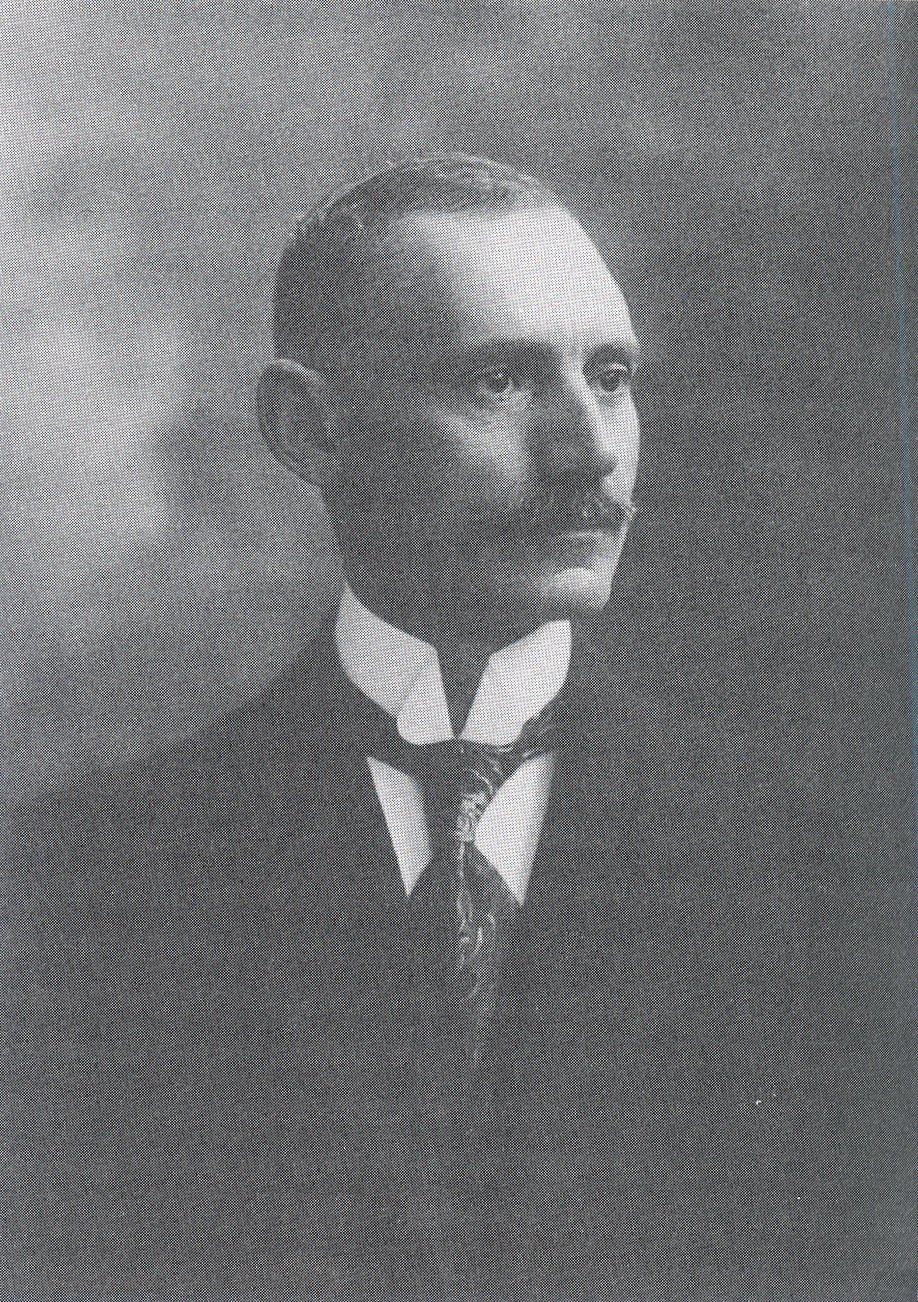
Stoyanov in Genoa, May 1922

Stoyanov remained fascinated with astronomy during his years as student and teacher. In 1898, he became one of the co-founders of the Bulgarian Physics and Mathematics Society. A year later, he went to study at the University of Toulouse. This move was financed with his own savings and a loan for BGN 1,500 from the Bulgarian National Bank. In 1903, Stoyanov graduated and returned to Sofia University as a teaching assistant. He went on to specialise in mathematical physics at the University of Göttingen between 1904 and 1906. Subsequently, he once again returned to Sofia University, this time as an “extraordinary” professor in astronomy. However, he only spent a short time in this position, since following student anti-government protests in 1907, the university was closed for six months and all professors were fired. About this time, Stoyanov also specialised at the Marseille Observatory.

In 1908, Nikola Stoyanov decided to put an end to his scientific career in astronomy and started work in the Bulgarian National Bank. Nevertheless, he sustained his interest in astronomy, and continued publishing scientific and popular science articles on the topic during the next decades. He was the author of the first contemporary astronomic study written by a Bulgarian and printed abroad (in Toulouse). In 1920 and in 1926 he was named Docent in astronomy at Sofia University, but refused to accept the post due to his workload at the Ministry of Finance.

All his life, Nikola Stoyanov remained active in helping advance the cause of Macedonian Bulgarians. He participated in the activities of the Dojran Brotherhood in Sofia and was named Secretary of the Union of Macedonian Brotherhood's Executive Committee in 1918 when the organisation was founded.

== In the banking sector ==
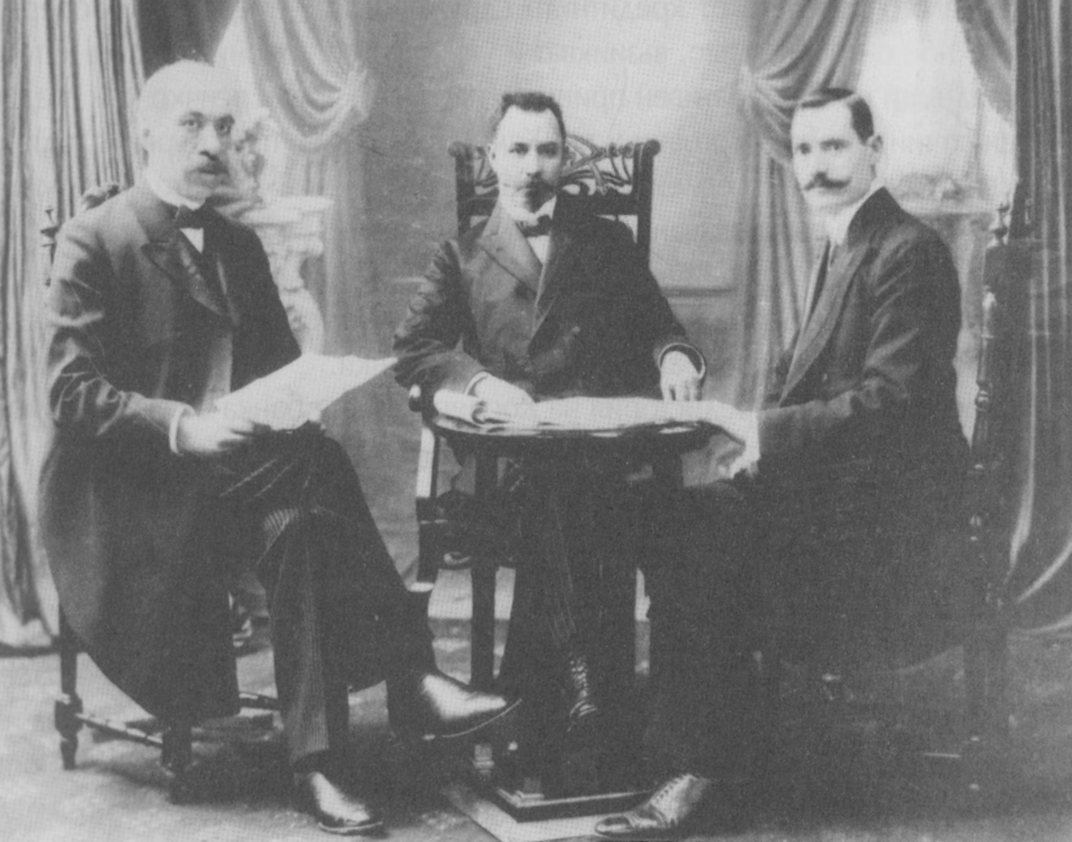
Nikola Stoyanov as part of the Bulgarian Central Cooperative Bank's first Managing Council, 1911

In 1908, Nikola Stoyanov headed the newly established Department for the Study of Finance at the Bulgarian National Bank. He spent the next couple of months reading various publications in the fields of economics, finance and statistics, including the works of scholars such as Vilfredo Pareto and Clément Juglar. Stoyanov's interests lay within problems such as Bulgaria’s balance of trade cycle, the interest rates on external loans, and the losses of the Bulgarian State Railways. In 1910, he published his first economic article in the journal of the Bulgarian Economic Society. The study was dedicated to the country's external debt.

In 1911, Stoyanov went on a journey to Germany in order to make himself familiar with agriculture insurance. Following his return to Bulgaria, he prepared a report that became the basis for the Act on the Insurance of Agriculture Crops against Hail and of Cattle against Death and Accidents. Subsequently, he joined the Bulgarian Central Cooperative Bank's first managing council. Stoyanov published numerous works on insurance during the following years. As he had already gained considerable professional prestige, in 1919 was considered for the position of director of the bank. Eventually he was not awarded the position, though a while later he headed the State Debt Department with the Ministry of Finance.

== State Guaranteed Debts Director ==
=== War reparation negotiations ===
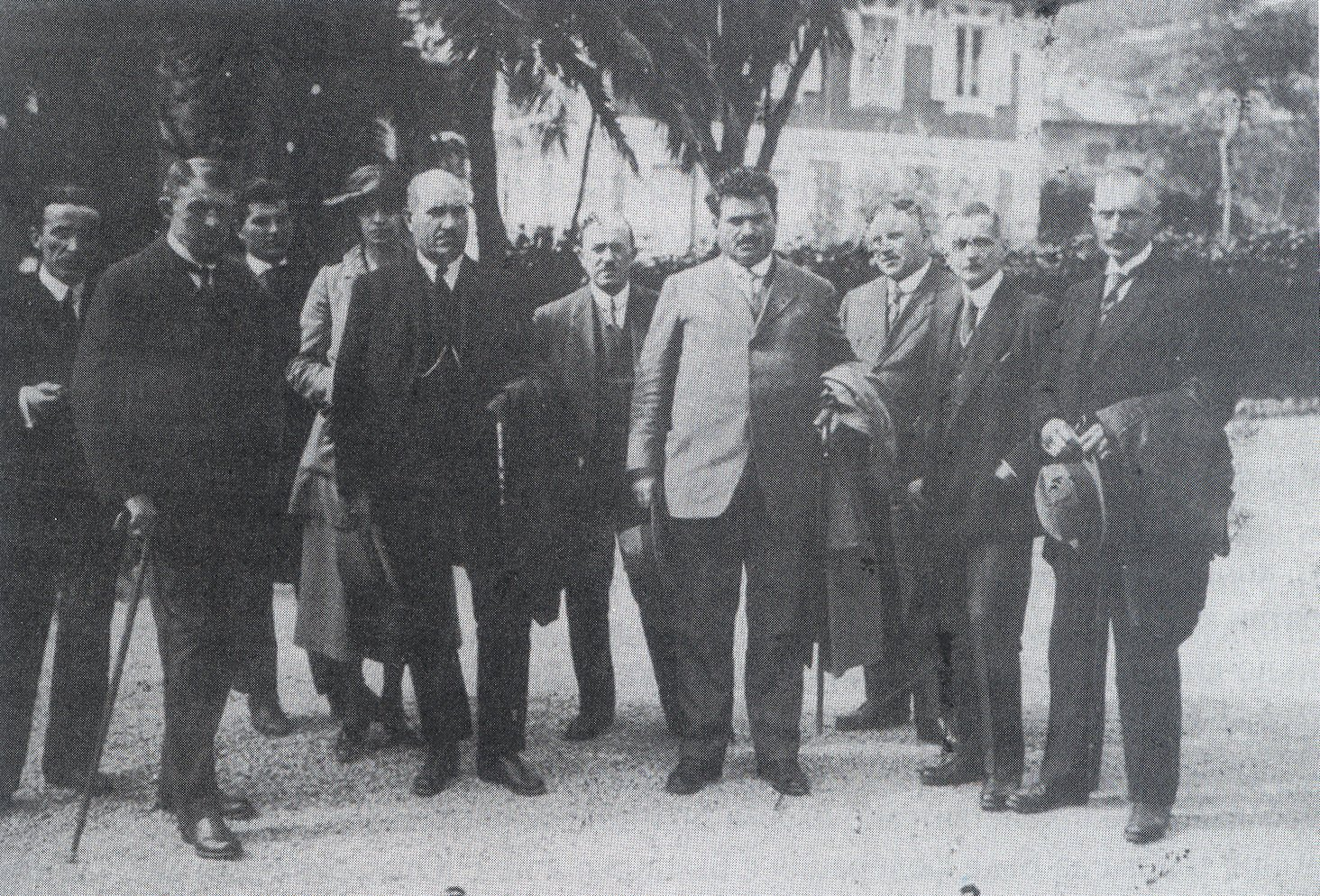
At the 1922 Genoa Conference together with the Bulgarian delegation

In 1919, Nikola Stoyanov was appointed Director of the Directorate General for State and State Guaranteed Debts. He spent 20 years in this position, with only a short interruption between May 1934 and April 1935. Just a week after his appointment, Mr. Stoyanov traveled to Paris as part of the Bulgarian delegation that signed the Treaty of Neuilly-sur-Seine.

Once the peace treaty was officially signed, Nikola Stoyanov was also appointed as assistant commissioner on reparations. Although Interior Minister Rayko Daskalov was officially the leading figure in these negotiations, it was Stoyanov himself – given his financial expertise – who led the process. Quite quickly he managed to earn himself the disapproval of the Military Inter-Allied Commission of Control. The French representative in the Commission described Stoyanov as a “national extremist expressing xenophobic views, at times even with ill intent.”

In 1923, Nikola Stoyanov became interim commissioner on reparations, following Rayko Daskalov's dismissal under pressure from the Commission. Even with this change, French representatives still insisted upon further changes to the list of Bulgarian negotiators. At about the same time, Stoyanov published an article under the title "The financial state of Bulgaria and the Bulgarian reparation debt". His pessimistic assessment of the country's solvency went against the policy of the Bulgarian government. Prime Minister Aleksandar Stamboliyski was at the time preparing a compromise solution on reparations. As a result, Stoyanov was not appointed permanent commissioner, but instead was given the task of leading the Bulgarian experts during negotiations with the Commission, which eventually led to the final approval of a reparation schedule with a protocol signed on March 21, 1923. Following the coup d'état of 1923, the new foreign minister Hristo Kalfov was appointed reparation commissioner, while Stoyanov remained his deputy.

In October 1924, Stoyanov entered a new conflict with the ACC, once again due to a publication of his that advocated the country's incapability of servicing its loans. When the next government assumed office in January 1926, Nikola Stoyanov was removed from reparation debt negotiations once and for all.

=== Negotiation of bond issues ===
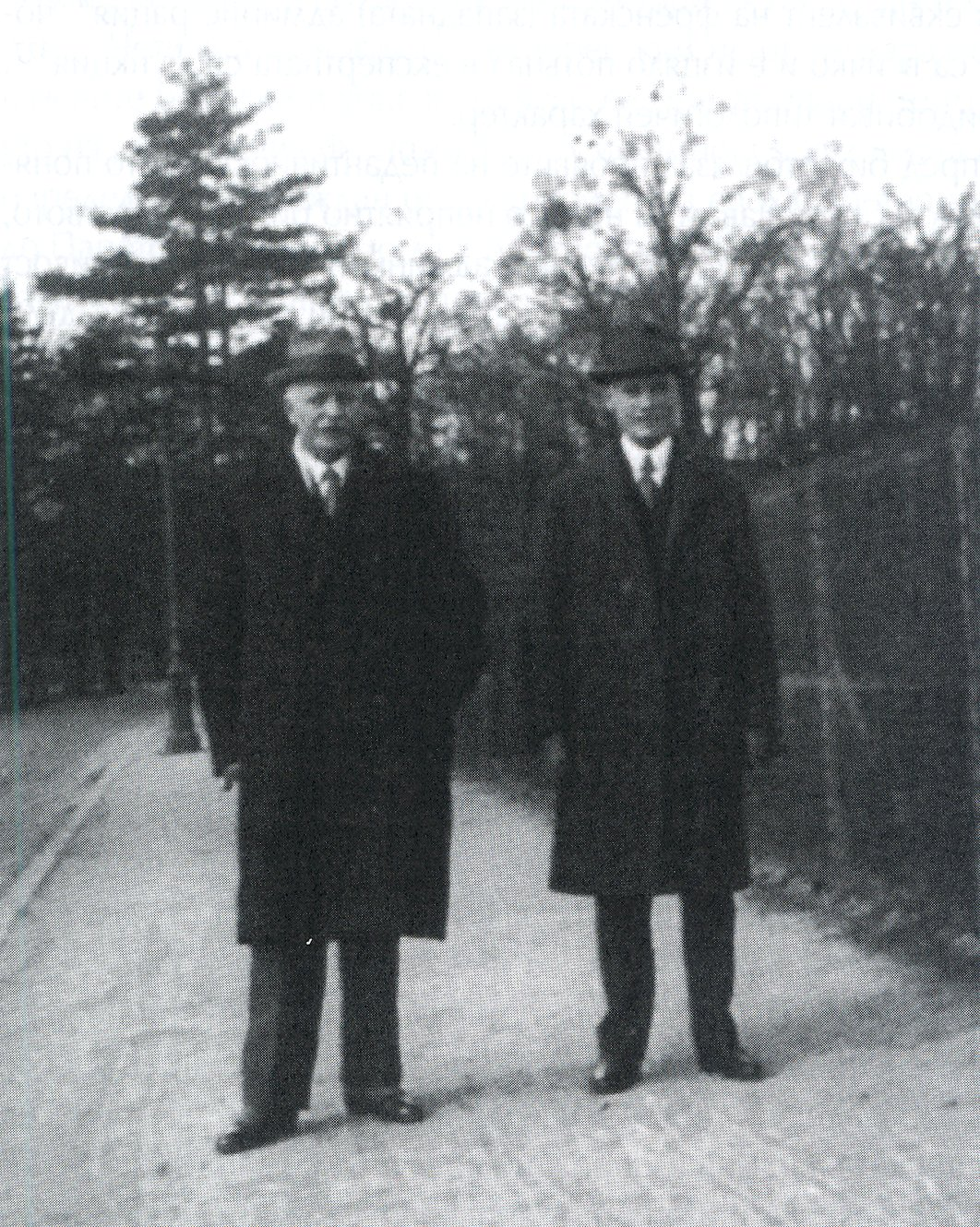
Together with Nikola Mushanov, during a visit to London for foreign debt negotiations, 1933

Unlike the aggressive and emotional line of conduct he followed when discussing reparations, Nikola Stoyanov kept calm while he led the complex negotiations on Interwar loans. In the 1920s, he managed to successfully conclude the Refugee and Stabilisation loans. The agreements helped stabilise Bulgaria’s national currency, the Lev, and, as an outcome, the country’s economy started registering growth. During talks, Mr. Stoyanov led an active correspondence and had to often meet with representatives of foreign financial circles. He gained a significant reputation among said circles in the process.

For the best part of the 1919–1939 period, during which Stoyanov headed the State Debt Directorate, Bulgaria was finding it hard to service its debts and was in constant negotiations for their restructuring and reduction. The largest part of the country’s pre-war debts was to French investors linked to Paribas Bank. Relations of another creditor, German Disconto-Gesellschaft were complicated by the peace treaties forced upon Bulgaria and Germany. British Schroders acted as the main intermediary in the issuance of League of Nations-guaranteed Refugee loan in 1926. Following a period of brief stabilisation in mid-1920s, the country was forced to establish a moratorium on foreign debt payments in 1932. This marked the beginning of another round of negotiations with creditors.

After the 1934 coup, Stoyanov was briefly removed from his position in the State Debt Directorate as well as from foreign debt negotiations. The newly appointed head of negotiations, Petar Todorov, went to London in 1934, where his behaviour was described as perplexed and incompetent. Following the unjustifiably large concessions he made in the next round of negotiations, Todorov was removed from the position in the beginning of 1935. Thus, Stoyanov was installed back and resumed the negotiations’ process.

== Other state and public posts ==
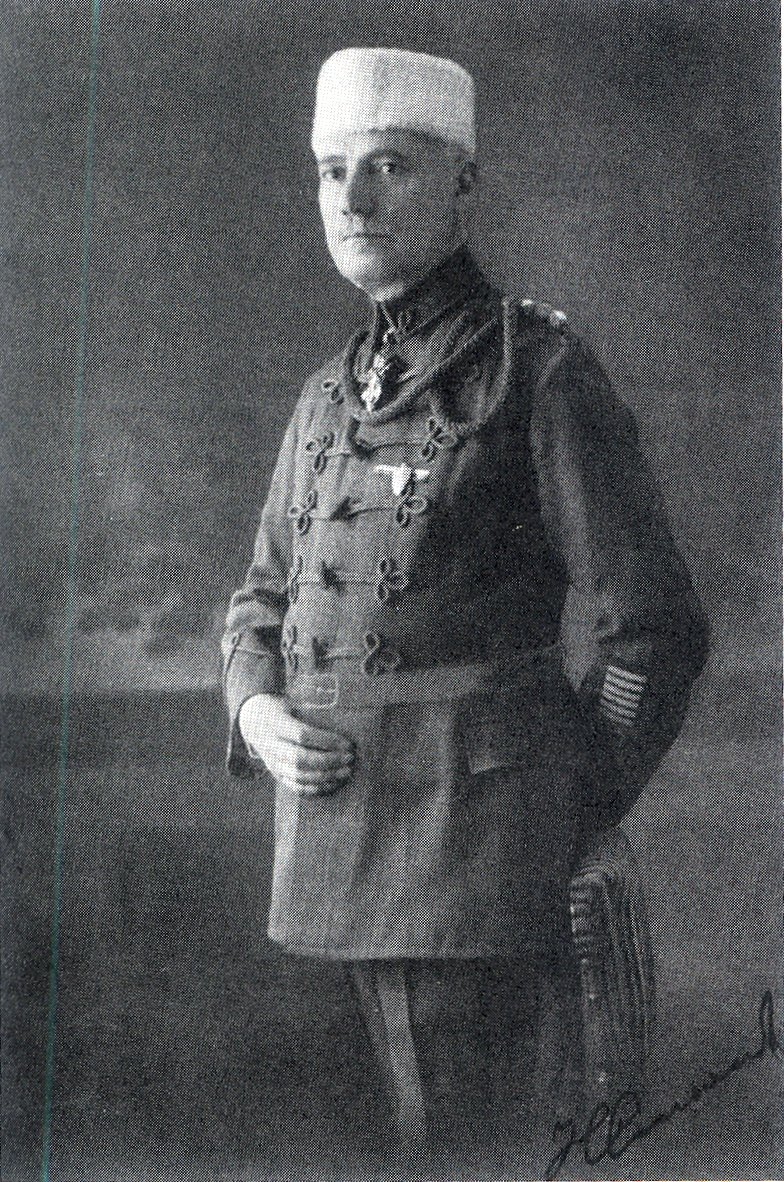
Stoyanov in a ‘’Yunak’’ Union uniform

While serving as State Debt Directorate Head, Stoyanov took other state posts for various terms. He was the state representative in the Sofia Stock Exchange, member of the committee regulating insurance, as well as part of the boards of various institutions, like the State Public Depot, the Liquidating Fund, the State Lottery, and the Committee for the Construction of the Rila Water Pipe. Between 1935 and 1936, he was also Secretary General of the Ministry of Finance.

In the meantime, Stoyanov was among the active figures of the Bulgarian Economics Society (BES) and the Statistical Institute for Economic Research. He was editor-in-chief of the BES Magazine between 1929 and 1944.

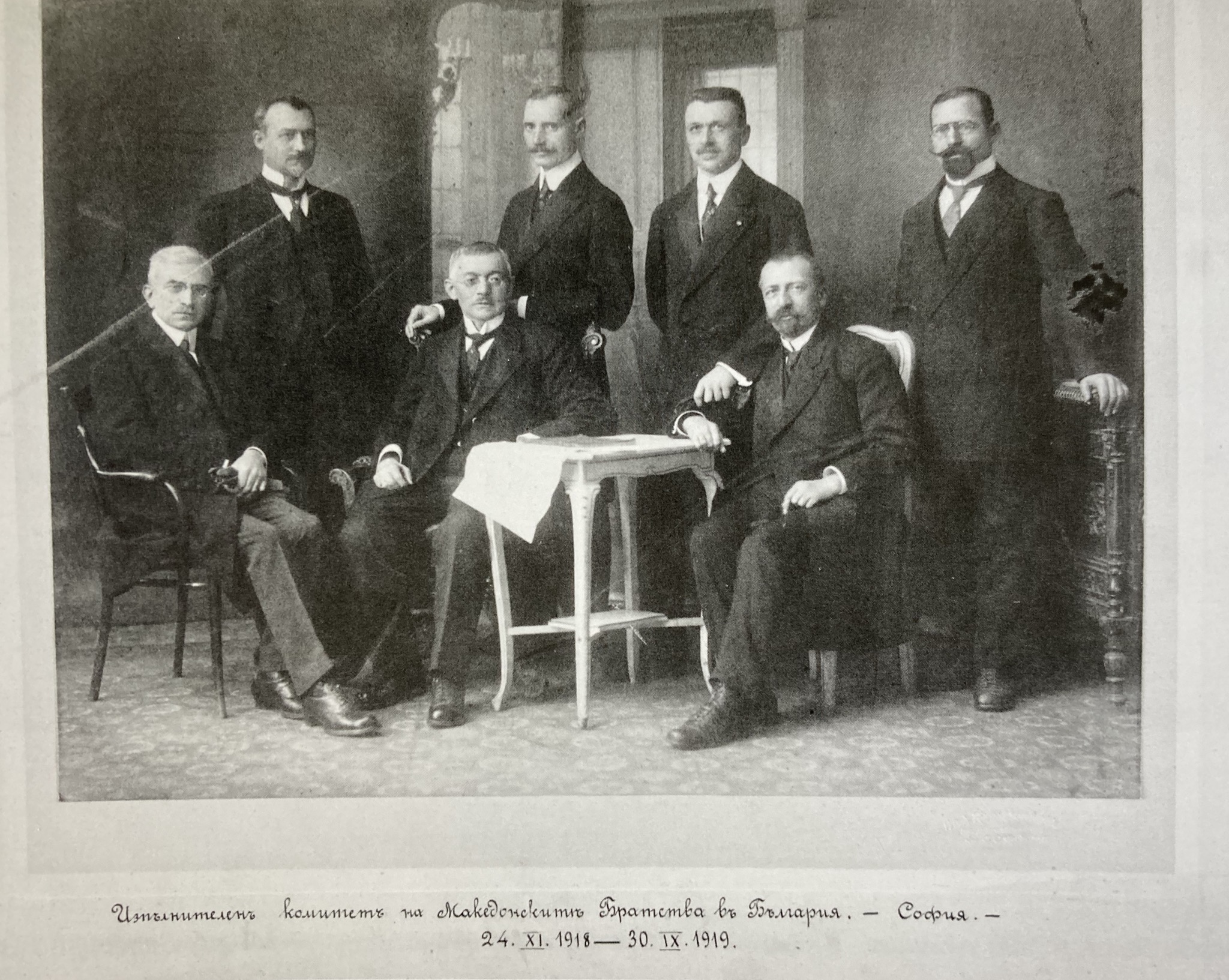
The Executive Committee of the Macedonian Brotherhoods in Bulgaria. Stoyanov is the second man (standing) from left to right.

In 1925 Stoyanov headed the Managing Council of the newly established Macedonian Cooperative Bank. He was among the founding members of the Macedonian Scientific Institute (MSI) and went on to chair the institute, following Lyubomir Miletich’s death in 1938. After the murder of Aleksandar Protogerov in 1928, Stoyanov started supporting the so-called ‘’Mihaylovist’’ fraction of the Internal Macedonian Revolutionary Organization. One of the most prominent Macedonian Bulgarians, three-time Prime Minister Andrey Lyapchev, named Stoyanov as his last will’s executor. Soon after World War II broke out, Stoyanov, acting as MSI Chair, signed the 1940 Declaration of the Macedonian Émigré Organisations which changed the goal of the Macedonian liberation movement from autonomy for Macedonia and the Adrianople region and independent Macedonia to Macedonia’s incorporation into Bulgaria. A year later, as Chairman of the Doyran Brotherhood, he signed the Appeal for Vardar Macedonia’s incorporation into Bulgaria.

Stoyanov participated in yet more public organisations, like the Yunak Gymnastic Society, the Periodicals’ Union, and the local Rotary Club, among others. He was a long-serving Chairman of Alliance française branch in Sofia, for which he was pronounced Officer of the French Legion of Honour in 1935. Thirteen years later Stoyanov received the rank of Commandeur (Commander).

== Later years ==
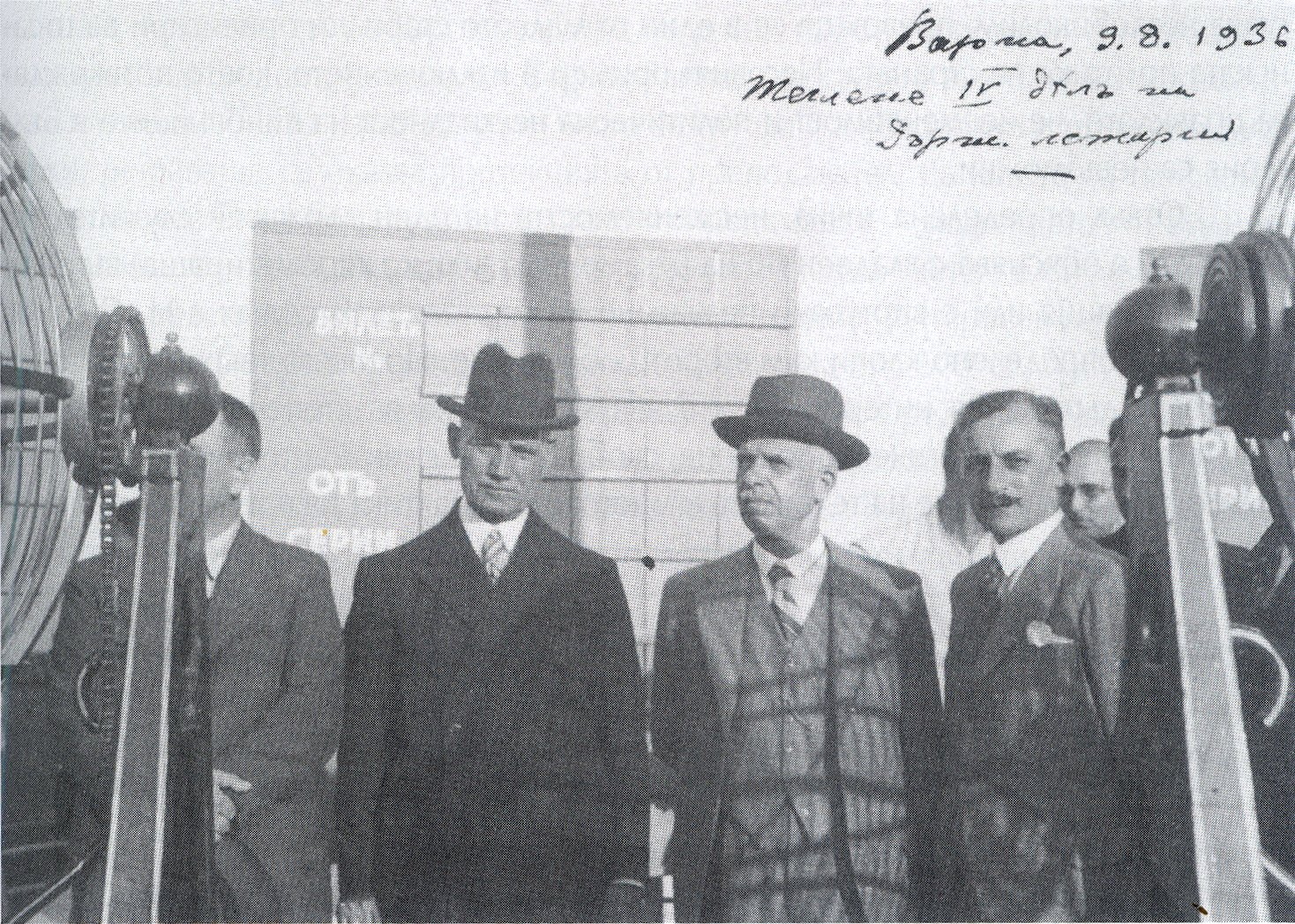
Stoyanov as part of the State Lottery committee

Nikola Stoyanov retired on June 1, 1939, at the age of 65. On January 17, 1945, following the 1944 coup d'état, the Interior Ministry ordered him removed as chair of the MSI. A month later, Stoyanov was arrested and sent to the Home for Blind People, which Communist authorities used as a distribution center for political prisoners. He remained there until November of the same year.

During his extensive career in state administration, Nikola Stoyanov tried to showcase his political neutrality, although some of his actions suggested he had sympathies for the Bulgarian Agrarian People's Union. After his release from prison at the end of 1945, he started publicly supporting the Agrarian Union, then in opposition. Nevertheless, Stoyanov did criticise party leader Nikola Petkov’s pro-Yugoslav stances.

In the months before the totalitarian regime took a firm grip on Bulgaria, Nikola Stoyanov contributed to the journal of the newly established Institute for Economic Rationalisation. In 1947, he finished a detailed comparison of conditions laid out in the Neuilly-sur-Seine Treaty from 1919 and the draft of the Paris Peace Treaties, which was being negotiated at the time. Stoyanov sent out sharp criticism over what he deemed a “punitive and unjust reparation debt.” The study was published by the Bulgarian Economic Society's journal. Stoyanov later wrote another work on the same subject for the leading opposition newspaper, People's Agrarian Flag. This time he also criticised the way the government led negotiations and called for a revision of the treaty.

Stoyanov died in 1967 in Sofia.

== Selected works ==
- The financial state of Bulgaria and the Bulgarian reparation debt. Sofia (1923).
- Reparations and inter-allied debts. Sofia (1933).

== Sources ==
- Avramov, Rumen. Komunalniyat Kapitalizam T.I. (in Bulgarian). Fondatsia Balgarska nauka i kultura/Center for Liberal Strategies. ISBN 978-954-90758-7-8.
- Gadzhev, Ivan (2007). Ivan Mihaylov (otvad legendite) (in Bulgarian). Vol. I. Sofia: Universitetsko izd-vo "Sv. Kliment Okhridski".
- Kolev, Dimitar. Bulgarian astronomy: From John Exarch till nowadays (PDF). Shumen, Bulgaria.
- Macedonian Review (in Bulgarian). Vol. 21. Macedonian Scientific Institute. 1994.
- Nenovsky, Nikolay (2012). "Theoretical Debates in Bulgaria during the Great Depression" (PDF). Œconomia – History, Methodology, Philosophy. 2 (1): 67–101.
- Vachkov, Daniel (2008). Istoria na Vanshnia Dalg na Bulgaria, 1878-1990 (PDF) (in Bulgarian). Vol. II. Sofia: Bulgarian National Bank. ISBN 978-954-8579-19-3.
