= Afanasiy Selishchev =

- Афанасий Матвеевич Селищев
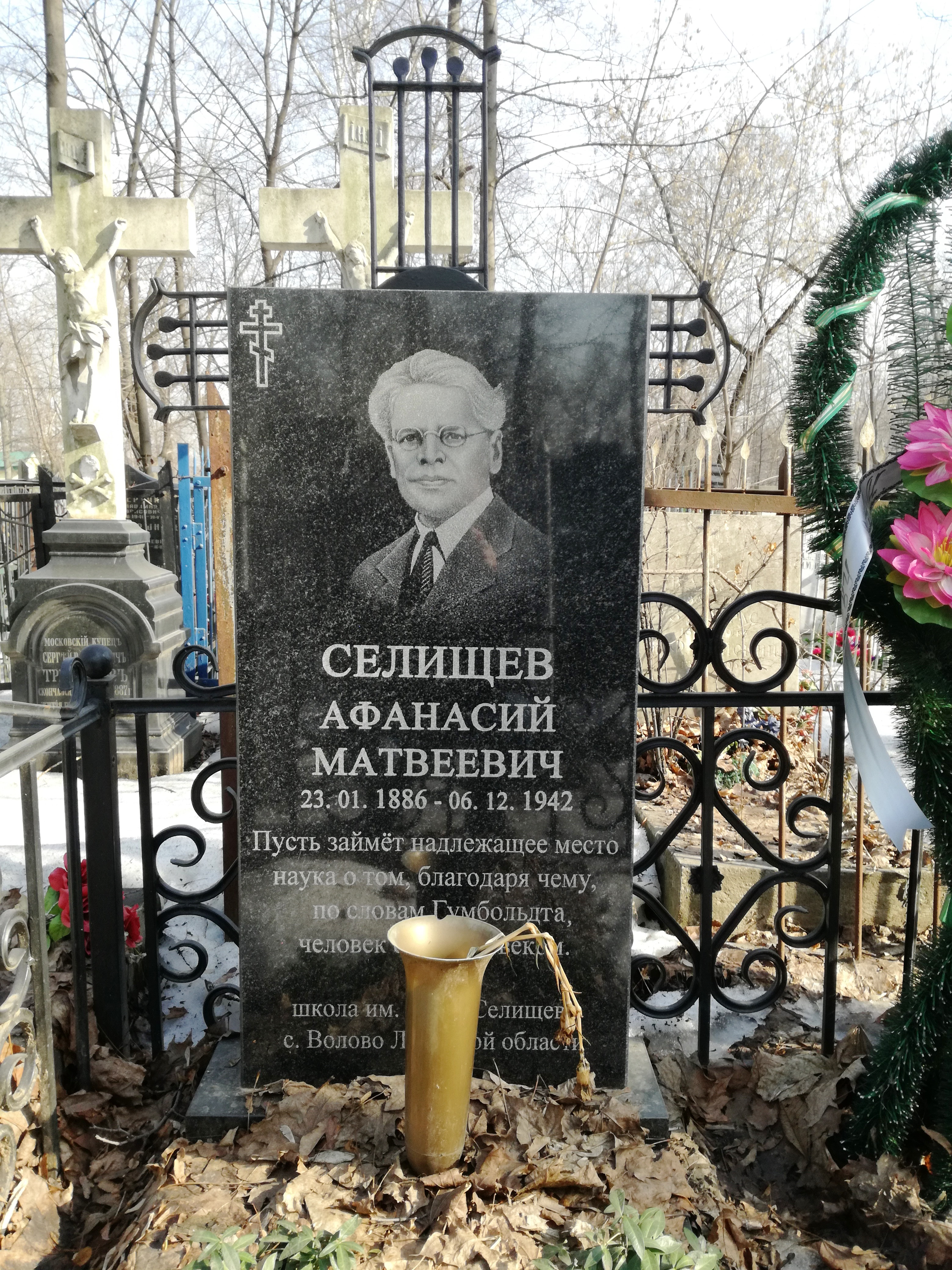
- The grave of Afanasiy Selishchev at the Danilov Cemetery in Moscow
- Born: 23 January 1886; Volovo, Russian Empire
- Died: 6 December 1942 (aged 56); Moscow, Soviet Union
- Resting place: Danilov Cemetery
- Citizenship: Russian Empire, Soviet Union
- Education: Kazan University
- Known for: Slavic population in Albania; Macedonian dialectology; Old Church Slavonic studies
- Scientific career
- Fields: Philology, Slavic studies, Linguistics, Dialectology
- Workplaces: Irkutsk State University, Kazan University, Moscow State University, Moscow State Pedagogical University
- Notable students: Samuil Bernstein

Afanasiy Matveyevich Selishchev (Афанасий Матвеевич Селищев; 23 January 1886 – 6 December 1942) was a prominent Russian linguist, specialist in the field of Slavic languages and Slavic (including Bulgarian) dialectology. He was a corresponding member of the Bulgarian Academy of Sciences and the Russian Academy of Sciences.

== Biography ==
Afanasiy Selishchev was born on 11/23 January 1886 in the village of Volovo, Oryol Governorate. He graduated from the Faculty of History and Philology at Kazan University in 1911.

He taught at Irkutsk University (1918–1920), Kazan University (1920–1921), and Moscow State University from 1921. Between 1931 and 1933, he worked at the short-lived Research Institute of Linguistics in Moscow under the Ministry of Education, established by opponents of the Japhetic theory. In early 1934, he was arrested during the "Slavicists' case" and sent into exile. In 1937, he returned to Moscow and became a professor at the Moscow Institute of Philosophy, Literature and History and the Moscow State Pedagogical University.

Selishchev was a corresponding member of the Finno-Ugrian Society in Helsinki (1926), the Academy of Sciences of the USSR (1929), and the Bulgarian Academy of Sciences (1930).

== Scientific contributions ==
Selishchev was among the most significant Russian Slavicists of the 20th century, authoring works on the history of the Russian language, comparative grammar of Slavic languages, Slavic dialects in Albania, and Bulgarian dialects in Macedonia, as well as on Balkan studies, Slavic paleography, and toponymy.

He considered the Macedonian dialects to be part of the Bulgarian language and sharply criticized the Serbianizing concept of Aleksandar Belić. However, according to Samuel Bernstein, he objected when political conclusions regarding territorial affiliation were drawn from his theories in Bulgaria. In the selected works of Selishchev published in 1968, the Macedonian dialects are presented as part of the Bulgarian linguistic territory. He was a member of the Macedonian Scientific Institute in Sofia.

Selishchev authored the major work "Dialectological Sketch of Siberia" (Issue 1, 1921), and sociolinguistic works on changes in the Russian language after the October Revolution: "The Language of the Revolutionary Era" (1928; the work was quickly suppressed due to quotes from Trotsky, Kamenev, and others; reprinted in 2003), and "On the Language of the Modern Village" (1939). His book "Old Church Slavonic Language" was published posthumously in two parts (1951–1952). It remains one of the best descriptions of the language of the oldest written monuments and serves as a fundamental textbook, reprinted in 2001 and 2006.

== Major works ==
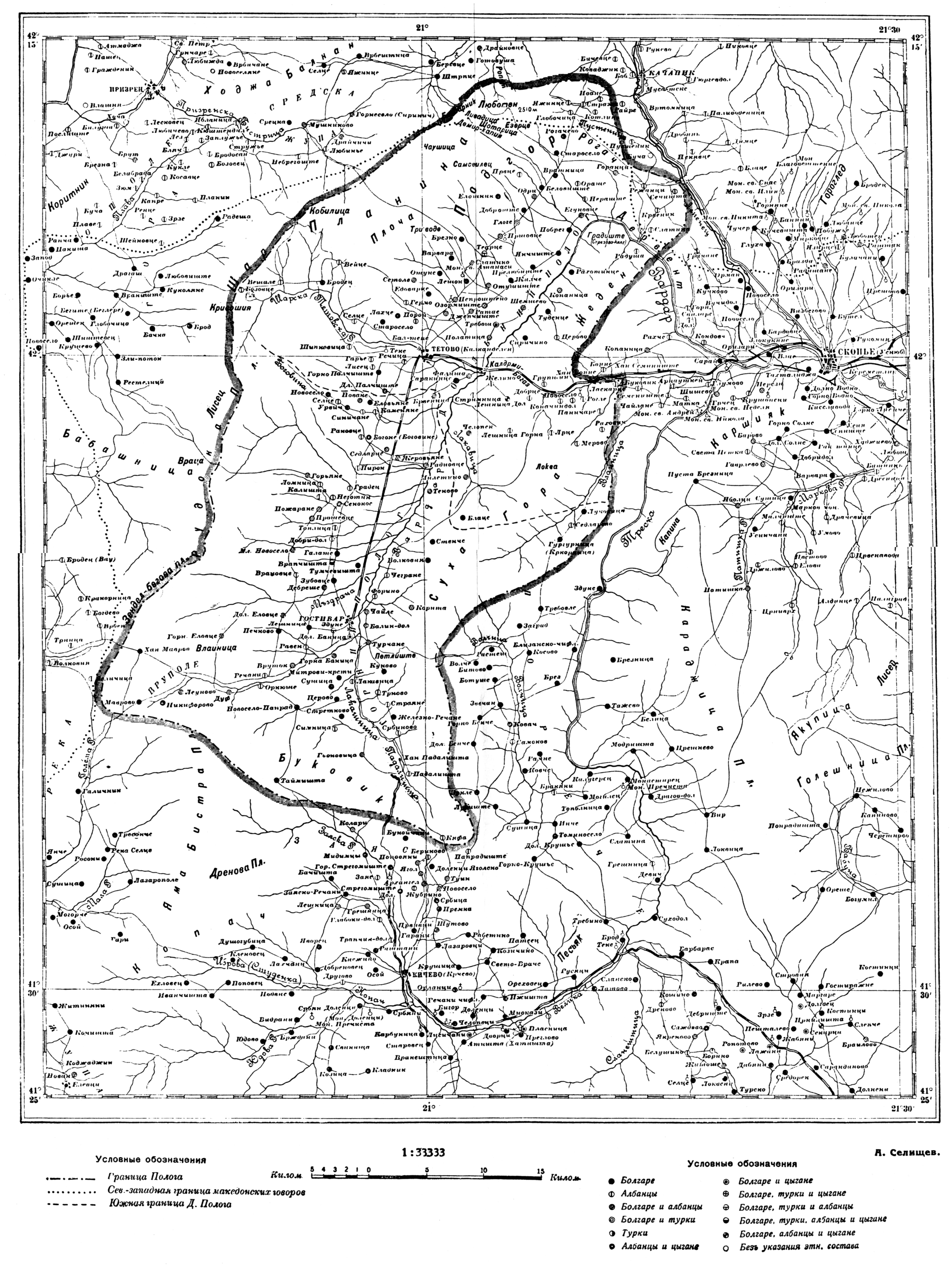
Ethnographic map of Polog, 1929

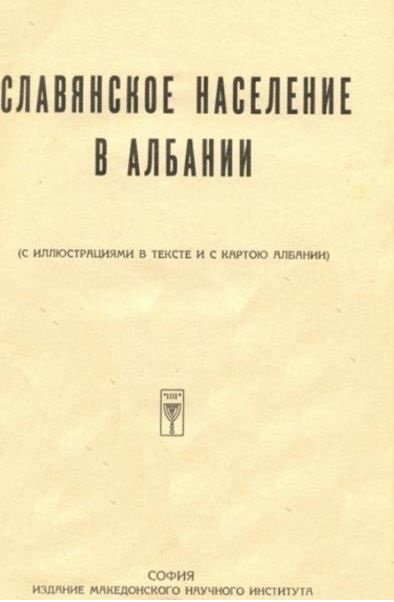
Slavic Population in Albania, Edition of the Macedonian Scientific Institute, Sofia, 1931

- Introduction to the Comparative Grammar of Slavic Languages. Kazan, 1914, Issue 1, 123 pp.
- Sketches on Macedonian Dialectology. Kazan, 1918, Vol. 1, 284 pp.
- Dialectological Sketch of Siberia. Irkutsk, 1920, Issue 1, 297 pp.
- The Language of the Revolutionary Era: Observations on the Russian Language of Recent Years (1917–1926). Moscow, 1928, 248 pp.
- Polog and its Bulgarian Population: Historical, Ethnographic and Dialectological Sketches of Northwestern Macedonia. Sofia, 1929, 439 pp.
- Slavic Population in Albania. Sofia, 1931, 352 pp.
- Macedonian Dialectology and Serbian Linguists. Sofia, 1935, 101 pp.
- Slavic Linguistics. Vol. 1. West Slavic Languages: Textbook. Moscow, 1941, 468 pp.
- Old Church Slavonic Language. In 2 parts: Textbook. Moscow: Uchpedgiz, 1951, 1952
  - Part 1: Introduction. Phonetics. 1951, 336 pp.
  - Part 2: Texts. Dictionary. Sketches of Morphology. 1951, 206 pp.
- Selected Works. Moscow, 1968.
