= Trakovice =

- Municipality
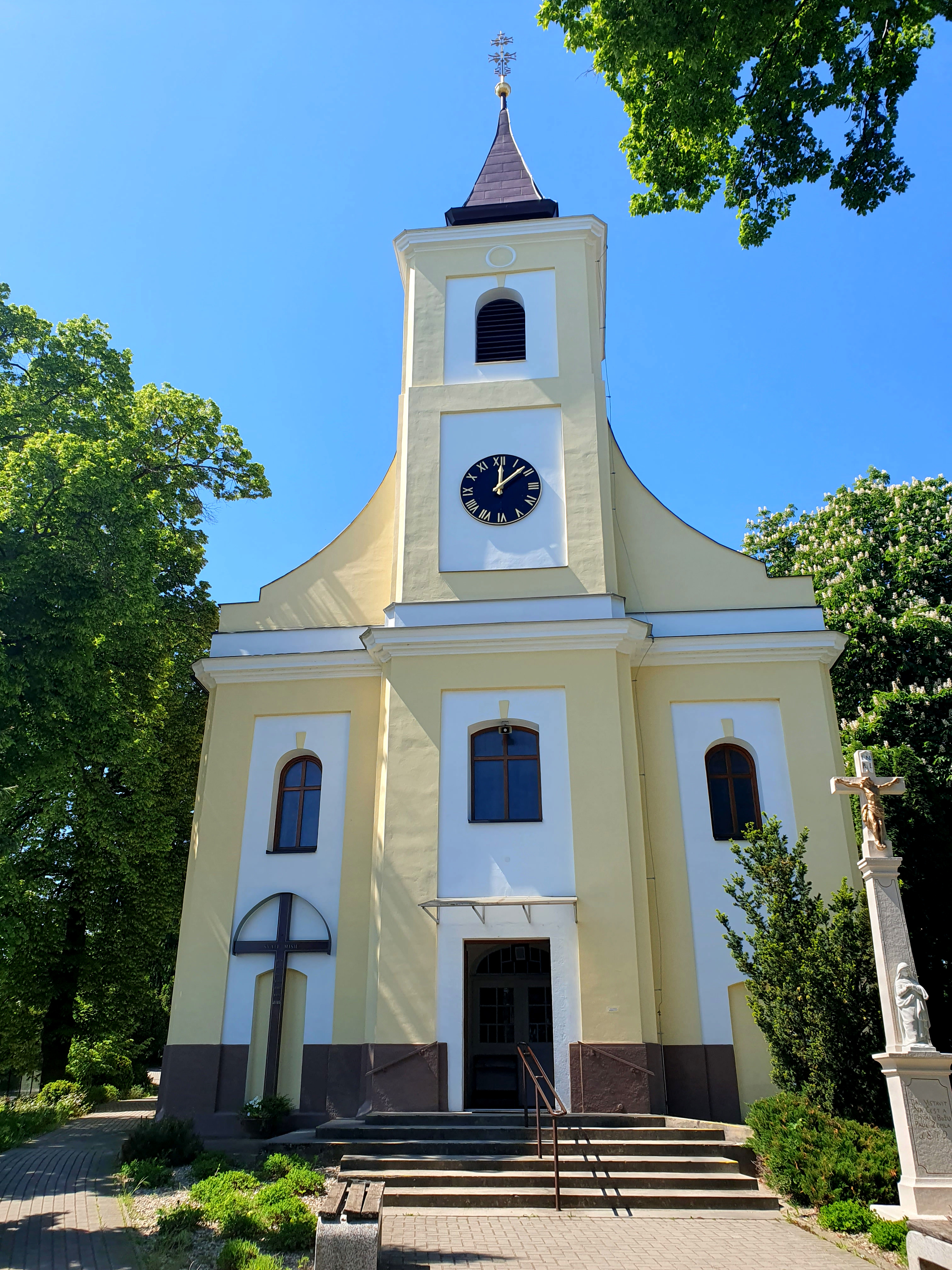

- Flag

- Location of Trakovice in the Trnava Region Location of Trakovice in Slovakia
- Coordinates: 48.43°N 17.70°E
- Country: Slovakia
- Region: Trnava Region
- District: Hlohovec District
- First mentioned: 1275

Area
  - Total: 11.63 km^{2} (4.49 sq mi)
- Elevation: 143 m (469 ft)

Population (2025)
  - Total: 1,523
- Time zone: UTC+1 (CET)
  - Summer (DST): UTC+2 (CEST)
- Postal code: 919 33
- Area code: +421 33
- Vehicle registration plate (until 2022): HC
- Website: www.trakovice.sk

Trakovice (Hungarian: Karkóc) is a village and municipality in Hlohovec District in the Trnava Region of western Slovakia.

== History ==
In historical records the village was first mentioned in 1275.

== Geography ==
The municipality lies at an altitude of 143 metres (469 ft) and covers an area of 11.63 km^{2} (4.49 sq mi) (2025).

== Population ==
Population statistic (10 years)
Year	1995	2005	2015	2025
Count	1248	1385	1510	1523
Difference		+10.97%	+9.02%	+0.86%

Population statistic
Year	2024	2025
Count	1539	1523
Difference		−1.03%

It has a population of 1523 people (31 December 2025).

=== Ethnicity ===
Census 2021 (1+ %)
Ethnicity	Number	Fraction
Slovak	1547	97.84%
Not found out	29	1.83%
Total	1581	

In year 2021 was 1581 people by ethnicity 1547 as Slovak, 29 as Not found out, 10 as Czech, 8 as Rusyn, 3 as Ukrainian, 2 as Romani, 2 as Hungarian, 1 as Silesian, 1 as Polish, 1 as Moravian, 1 as Other and 1 as English.

Note on population: The difference values of population numbers in the table "Population statistic" and in the sections "Ethnicity" & "Religion" is caused by the use of various statistical methods.

=== Religion ===
Census 2021 (1+ %)
Religion	Number	Fraction
Roman Catholic Church	1267	80.14%
None	221	13.98%
Not found out	25	1.58%
Greek Catholic Church	18	1.14%
Total	1581	

In year 2021 was 1581 people by religion 1267 from Roman Catholic Church, 221 from None, 25 from Not found out, 18 from Greek Catholic Church, 15 from Evangelical Church, 8 from Christian Congregations in Slovakia, 7 from Ad hoc movements, 5 from Other, 4 from Other and not ascertained christian church, 3 from Eastern Orthodox Church, 3 from Buddhism, 2 from Calvinist Church, 1 from Jehovah's Witnesses, 1 from Islam and 1 from Hinduism.

== Notable people ==
- Rudolf Krajčovič, linguist
