= Danilov Cemetery =

Danilovskoye Cemetery
- Даниловское кладбище
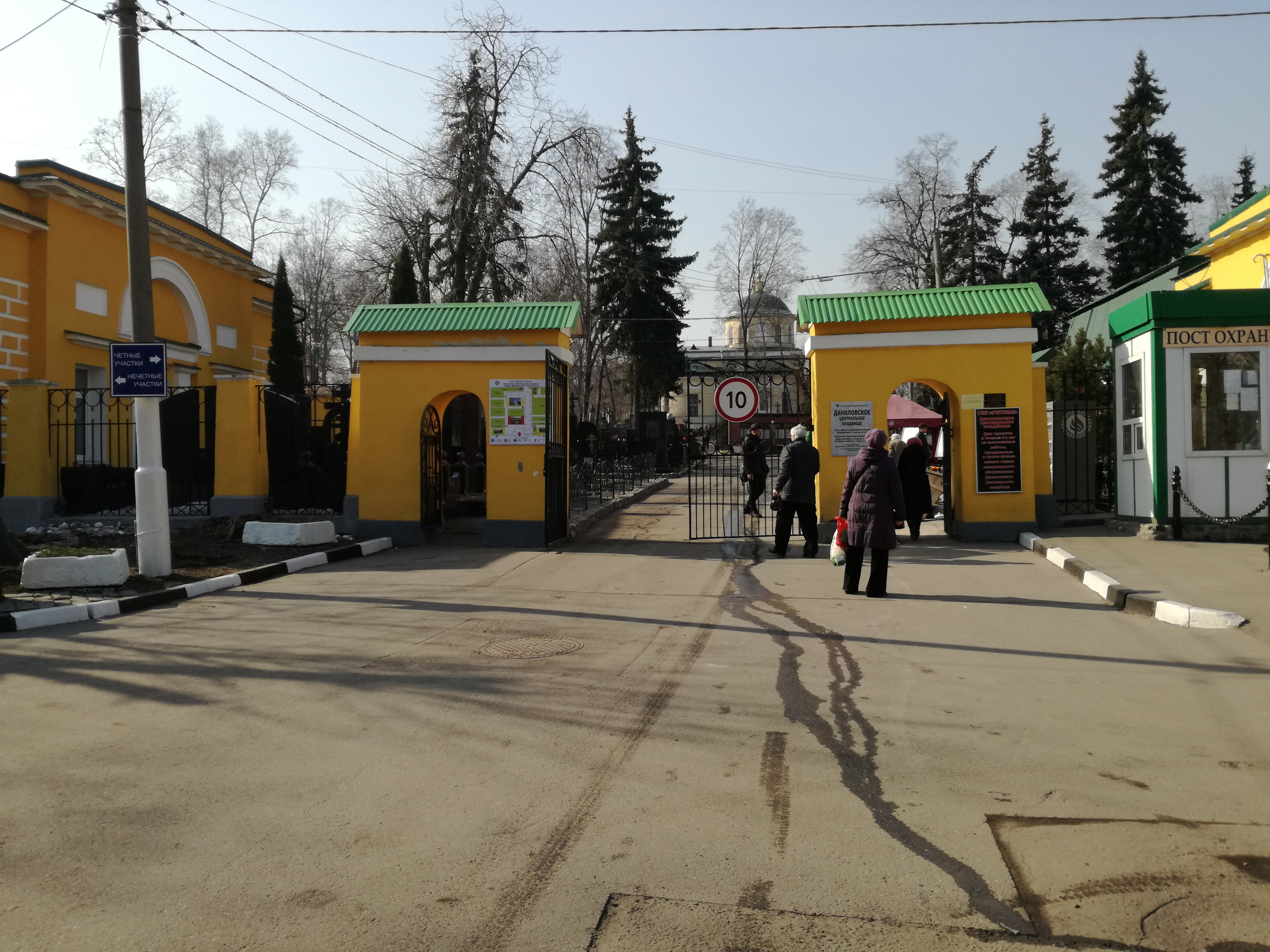
- Interactive map of Danilovskoye Cemetery

Details
- Established: 1771
- Location: Moscow
- Country: Russia
- Coordinates: 55°42′14″N 37°36′36″E
- Size: 0.035 km^{2} (4 ha)

Danilovskoye Cemetery (Russian: Даниловское кладбище) is one of the largest cemeteries in Moscow. It is located in the Donskoy District of the Southern Administrative Okrug. Founded in 1771, it was named after the Danilovskaya Sloboda, near which it was located. It is divided into a central section and a Muslim section. The total area is 35 hectares. It is under the jurisdiction of the Moscow State Budgetary Institution "Ritual".

== History ==
In 1771, a bubonic plague swept through Moscow, killing up to 800 people per day at its peak. By decree of the Governing Senate, burying the dead was prohibited within the city, and separate cemeteries were established for them outside Moscow. One of these cemeteries was established near the Danilovskaya Sloboda, from which it received its name—this section was known as the Central Cemetery. Adjacent to it, on the slope of the Andreevsky Ravine, a site was allocated for the Muslim Cemetery for the burial of non-believers. It was also designated for the burial of those who died from the plague.

On December 31, 1772, a wooden cemetery church dedicated to the Hieromartyrs of Cherson was built and consecrated. By 1828, it had fallen into disrepair, and to replace it, merchant Semyon Lepeshkin began construction of the Church of the Descent of the Holy Spirit in the Empire style, designed by architect Fyodor Shestakov. An almshouse, an outbuilding, and a cemetery fence were built at the same time. The old church was demolished in 1832, and construction of the church was completed in 1838.

In 1901, the Church of Saint Nicholas was built and consecrated on the cemetery grounds, and a year later, the St. Nicholas Chapel was erected. In 1906, an extension was added to the south side of the church, designed by architect Nikolai Strukov. This allowed the altar of the right aisle to be moved in line with the main one. At the same time, the old iconostasis and murals from 1832 were preserved.

=== After the 1917 Revolution ===
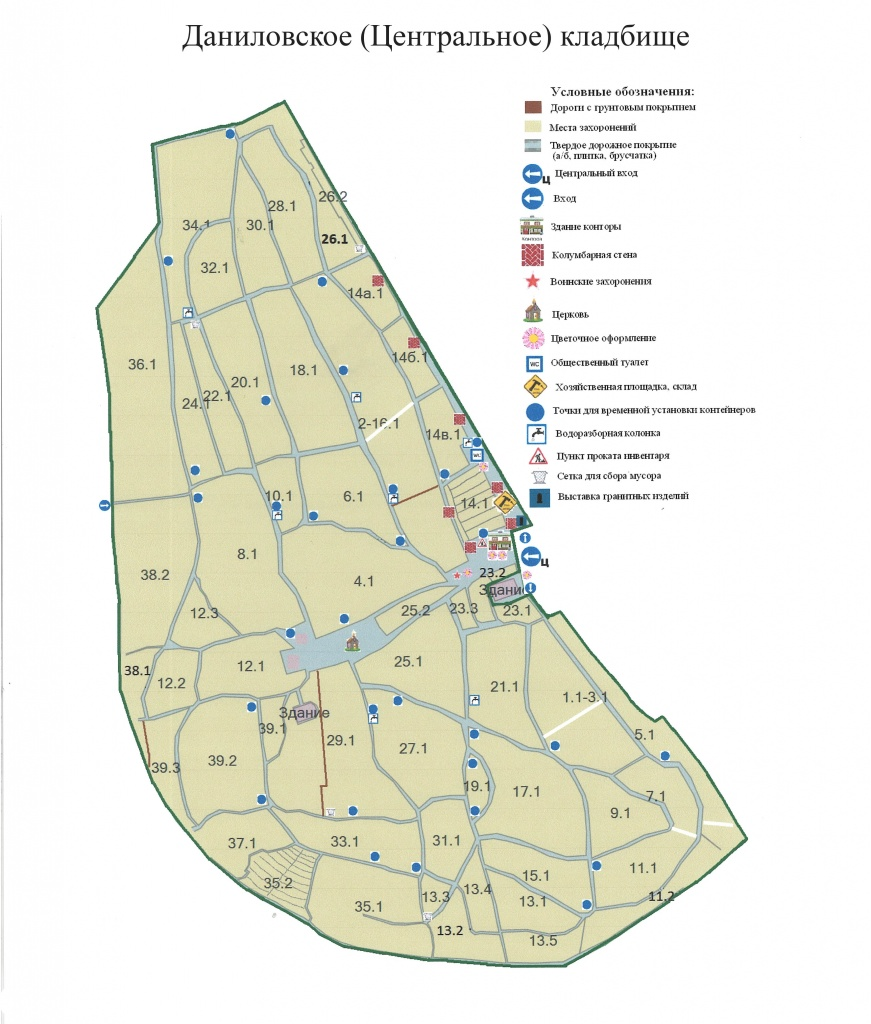
Danilovskoye Central Cemetery map, 2018

During Soviet times, members of the Orthodox clergy were buried in the cemetery.

With the establishment of Soviet power, many churches were closed as relics of the past. The church in the cemetery continued to function, but was seized by the Renovationists and, from 1937 to 1946, served as one of seven Renovationist churches in Moscow, after which it was returned to the Patriarchate.

In 1941, an anti-aircraft battery was located on the cemetery grounds to protect the capital from German air attacks. Concrete pillboxes were also erected there, two of which remain. In 1965, a memorial designed by sculptor Andrei Tumanov was erected at the mass grave of soldiers who died in battle during the Great Patriotic War and in hospitals.

== Notable burials ==
Buried in the cemetery are historian Ivan Kovalchenko, linguist Afanasiy Selishchev, philologist and philosopher Sergey Averintsev, Metropolitan Pitirim of Volokolamsk, art historian and theater critic Sergei Durylin, historian and Moscow scholar Mikhail Aleksandrovsky, artist and collector Ilya Ostroukhov, director of the Moscow Art Theater Museum Fyodor Mikhalsky, football player Valery Voronin, writer Yuri Yakovlev, Heroes of the Soviet Union Ivan Zaikin, Ilya Kotov and Nikolai Sidorov, and drama actors Yulia Borisova and Boris Novikov.

One of the most famous graves in the Muslim Cemetery is that of dancer Makhmud Esambayev.

At the Central Cemetery, the grave of Matrona Nikonova, canonized as a saint, was frequently visited. Pilgrims came daily to ask her for intercession or to take a handful of sand from her grave as a souvenir, as it was believed to possess miraculous properties. In 1998, her relics were transferred to the Intercession Monastery, but pilgrims continue to visit her former burial site. The cemetery contains seventeen graves venerated by Orthodox believers. The most popular among them are those of the Athonite hieromonk Aristoklius and the elder hieromonk Isaiah.

As of 2018, almost no merchant graves remain.
