= Camaldolese Dictionary =

Latin-Slovak dictionary from 1763

The Camaldolese Dictionary (Slovak: Kamaldulský slovník) is a Latin-Slovak dictionary from 1763.

== Overview ==
The book consists of two parts: the dictionary and brief orthographic and grammatical rules. The author(s) used a variant of a cultural Western-Slovak with some Central and Eastern-Slovak elements, making it one of the most important pre-codification works before the codification of Slovak language by Anton Bernolák. The origin of the dictionary is probably associated with the first known translation of the Bible into Slovak (the Camaldolese Bible).
