= The Law Book of Žilina =

Medieval law book

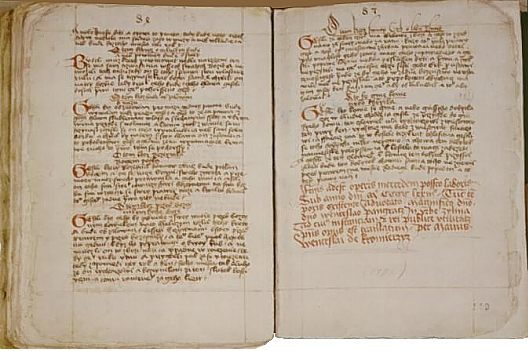
The Law Book of Žilina

The Law Book of Žilina (Slovak: Žilinská právna kniha, Žilinská kniha) from 1378 to 1561 is a medieval law book of Žilina. The book contains a written version of the Magdeburg Law alongside its translation into historical Slovak, as well as various law act records in German, Latin, and historical Slovak dialect.

Žilina was originally governed by the law brought from Polish Cieszyn where the court of appeal was also located. In 1364, Cziesyn adopted so-called Magdeburg Law. This was probably an impulse for Louis I of Hungary who warned Žilina that it should not appeal to the foreign court, but it should choose some town in the Kingdom of Hungary governed by the Magdeburg Law. Then, Žilina received the text of the law from Krupina. The original German text of the law was translated in 1473 by Václav of Kroměříž on the request of a hereditary reeve of Žilina Václav Pankrác of Svätý Mikuláš, Branč and Strečno.

The book is an important resource for linguistic research of old Slovak and old Czech. The translation of Magdeburg Law and later law act records were intended for the Slovak burgesses and members of the town council, so it contains a lot of contemporary Slovak lexemes and terminological or non-terminological idioms.
