= Samuel Czambel =

Slovak linguist (1856–1909)

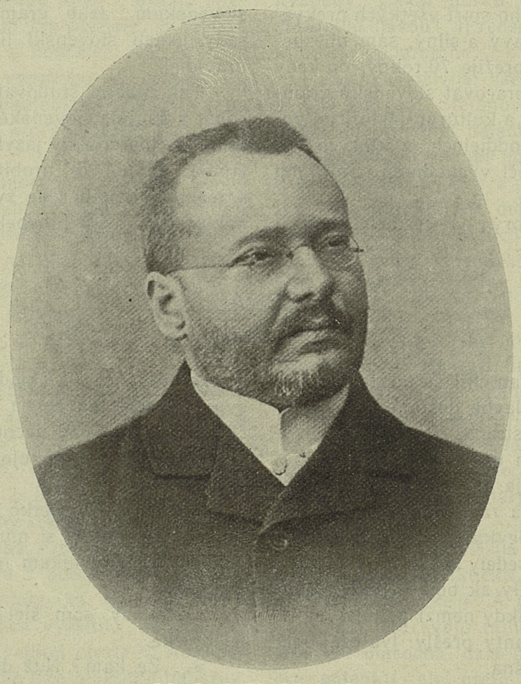
- Born: 24 August 1856; Slovenská Ľupča, Austrian Empire
- Died: 18 December 1909 (aged 53)

Samuel Czambel (24 August 1856 – 18 December 1909) was a Slovak linguist, translator and philologist.

== Life and career ==
Czambel was born on 24 August 1856 in Slovenská Ľupča, Austrian Empire (now Slovakia). He studied at grammar schools in Banská Štiavnica, Rimavská Sobota and Kežmarok. In 1876 he began studying law at the University of Budapest, from where he transferred in 1877 to the Faculty of Philosophy, where he took up Slavic studies. He continued his studies at the University of Vienna with Professor Franjo Miklošič and in Prague with Professor Martin Hattal. From 1879 he worked in the translation department at the Presidency of the Government in Budapest as a translator of laws into Slovak. In 1899 he became the Minister's Secretary. From 1906 he worked at the Ministry of the Interior, where he was the head of the translation center. In the years 1887–1896 he worked as a co-editor of the government's Slovak newspaper. He is buried at the National Cemetery in Martin.

== Works ==
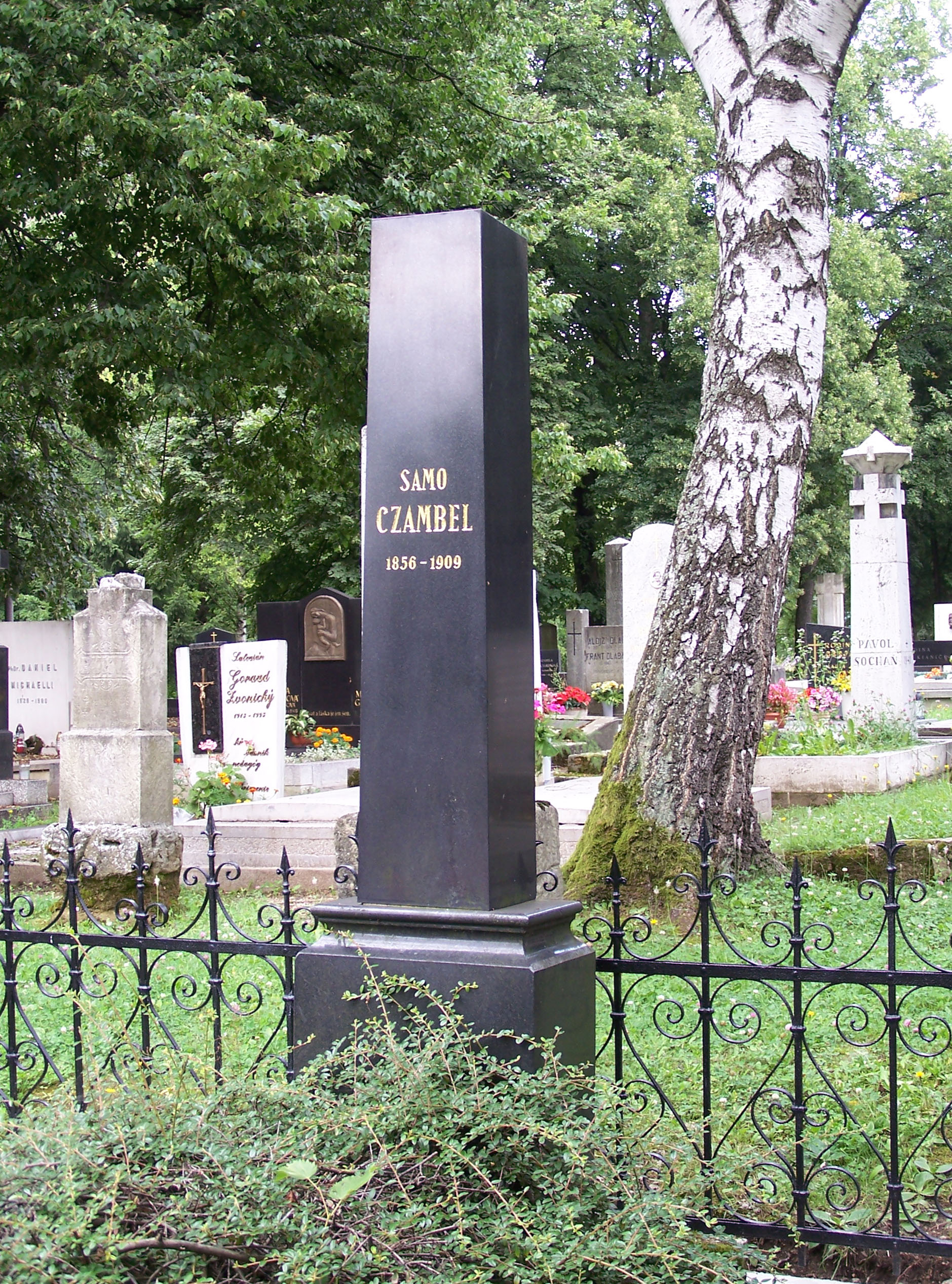
Sculpture dedicated to Czambel

Through scientific research, which resulted in his linguistic works, he contributed to the stabilization of the standard spelling of standard Slovak. His fundamental linguistic works include Contributions to the History of the Slovak Language (1887), Slovak Spelling (1890), On Speech on Slovak Spelling (1891) and, the codification Rukoväť spisovnej reči slovenskej (1902) based on the Central Slovak dialect, in which he corrected the inconsistencies of the Hodžov-Hattalov codification and contributed to the consolidation of the standard Slovak language. The third edition of his Rukoväť – edited and modified based on the so-called Martin usage by Jozef Škultéty after the author's death (published in 1919) – became the basis of contemporary standard Slovak and until the publication of the Rules of Slovak Spelling in 1931 was the de facto standard of the standard Slovak language. He was the author of a theory about the South Slavic origin of Slovaks and Slovak, which he published in the work Slovaks and their speech (1903). In the work Slovak speech and its place in the family of Slavic languages (1906), he wanted to examine linguistic material from all over Slovakia, but he managed to process only the part about East Slovak dialects. He was also the author of poems (From a travel diary, 1922), essays and humoresques, and national-political journalism. He collected dialect materials, among them folk prose, and especially fairy tales, which were published posthumously in several editions.
