= Rudolf Krajčovič =

Slovak linguist and Slavist (1927–2014)

Rudolf Krajčovič (22 July 1927 – 29 October 2014) was a Slovak linguist and Slavist, the author of migration-integration theory about the origin of the Slovak language.

== Life ==
Krajčovič was born in Trakovice. He studied Slovak and philosophy at the Comenius University in Bratislava, and later worked in several positions at the Department of the Slovak Language and Literature (assistant, docent, professor since 1986).

He worked abroad at various prestigious Slavist workplaces (Kraków 1963, Skopje 1977, Moscow 1970–1971, 1975–1976, 1980–1981). The secretary of the Association of Slovak Linguists (1957–1960), a member of the board (1966–1968), a vice-president (1968–1972). A vice-president of the Slovak Linguistic Society (1972–1973), a member of several international Slavist organizations.

== Selected works ==
- 1961 Vývin slovenského jazyka
- 1964 Pôvod juhozápadoslovenských nárečí a ich fonologický vývin
- 1974 Slovenčina a slovanské jazyky. Praslovanská genéza slovenčiny
- 1975 A Historical Phonology of the Slovak Language
- 1977 Svedectvo dejín o slovenčine
- 1981 Pôvod a vývin slovenského jazyka
- 1983 Čeština a slovenčina v starších archiváliách v predspisovnom období
- 1985 Veľká Morava v tisícročí slovami prameňov, legiend, kroník a krásnej spisby
- 1988 Vývin slovenského jazyka a dialektológia
- 1990 Dejiny spisovnej slovenčiny. Študijná príručka a texty
- 2005 Živé kroniky slovenských dejín skryté v názvoch obcí a miest

== Awards ==
- 1971 Plaque of Comenius University
- 1977 Bronze Medal of Comenius University
- 1987 Silver Medal of Comenius University
- 1986 Commemorative Medal of Ľudovít Štúr
- 1987 Medal of Comenius University
- 1995 Commemorative Medal of Pavol Jozef Šafárik University
- 1997 Gold Medal of Faculty of Philosophy of Comenius University
- 1997 Honors of the Minister of Culture of the Slovak Republic
