= Samuil Bernstein =

Soviet linguist (1911–1997)

- Самуил Бернштейн
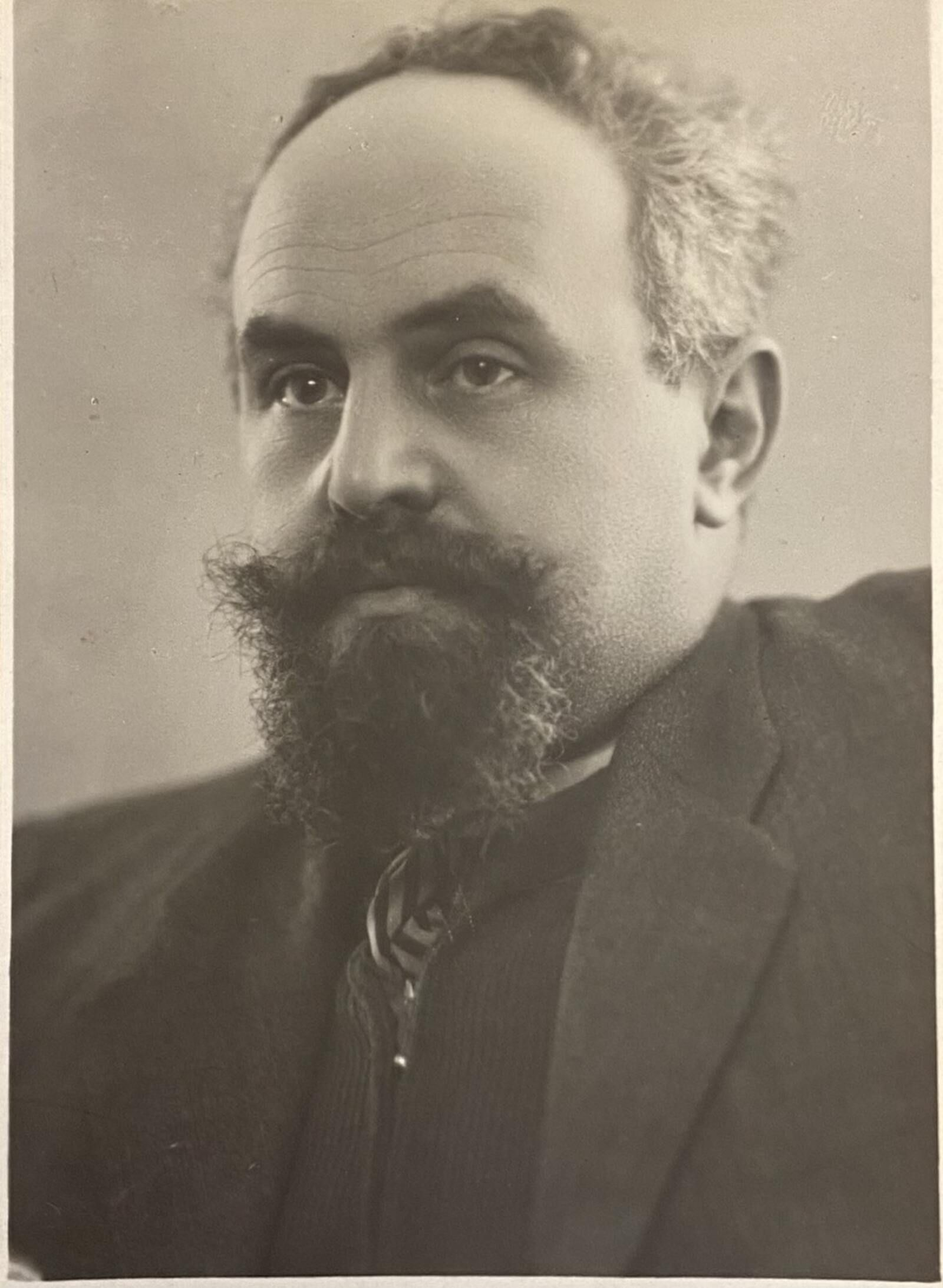
- Bernstein in 1949
- Born: 3 January 1911; Barguzin, Russian Empire
- Died: 6 October 1997 (aged 86); Moscow
- Resting place: Vvedenskoye Cemetery
- Education: Moscow State University
- Occupation: Linguist
- Awards: Order of the Badge of Honour; Order of Saints Cyril and Methodius
- Scientific career
- Fields: Linguistics
- Workplaces: RAN Institute for Slavic Studies
- Academic advisors: Afanasiy Selishchev; Miliy Dolobko; Grigory Ilynski
- Notable students: Natalya Ananyeva; Vladimir Zhuravlyov; Vladislav Illich-Svitych; Tatyana Tikhomirova; Nikita Tolstoy; Vladimir Toporov; Rina Usikova

Samuil Borisovich Bernstein (Russian: Самуил Борисович Бернштейн; surname also transcribed as Bernshteyn; December 21 [O.S. January 3] 1910 – October 6, 1997) was a Soviet linguist, known for his work on Slavic languages.

== Life and work ==
Samuil Bernstein was born in Barguzin, a village east of Lake Baikal in what is today Republic of Buryatia, in the Jewish family of Boris Samuilovich Bernstein, a revolutionary exiled to Siberia. With his parents' family, he moved around the Soviet Far East, including a few years in Alexandrovsk-Sakhalinsky, then the capital of Soviet Sakhalin Oblast. As there was no high school in town, he left his parents to attend a high school on the mainland, in Nikolsk Ussuriyski (now Ussuriysk). In 1928, he entered Moscow State University, graduating in 1931.

In 1934 Bernstein earned his Cand. Sc. degree, with a dissertation on the Turkish influence in the language of the Bulgarian translations of the Thesauros, the collection of sermons of Damaskinos Stouditis. His first academic job was in Odessa, where he became the chair of the Department of Bulgarian in the local teacher's institute (mostly training teachers for the ethnic-Bulgarian towns and villages), and, later, the chair of the Linguistics Department at the University of Odessa.

He contributed to Slavic linguistics. In the 1930s, he recognized the existence of a separate Macedonian language. In 1938, he wrote an article called "Macedonian Language" in the Great Soviet Encyclopedia. Bernstein moved to Moscow in 1939, soon joining the faculty of Moscow University. He received his Dr. Sc. degree in 1946, with a dissertation on the language of Slavic manuscripts from the Principality of Wallachia of the 14-15th centuries.

In 1943, as the Soviet Army was about to liberate the countries of Eastern Europe and to establish pro-Soviet governments there, it was decided by the Soviet Government that the USSR would soon need a large number of experts with training in various languages of these countries. At the time, few students in the USSR majored in West Slavic or South Slavic languages; to cure this perceived deficiency, the MSU was tasked by the then Minister of Education, Sergey Kaftanov, with the urgent creation of a Slavicist training program; Bernstein became one of the scholars entrusted with this project. He became instrumental in the creation of the Section (kafedra) of Slavic Languages at the university's Department of Philology, hiring suitable staff and designing instructional materials. In an article from 1944 titled "Slavic Languages (A General Overview)", he wrote that Moravian, Macedonian, Bosnian and Montenegrin are not independent Slavic languages.

On December 12, 1944, the Anti-fascist Assembly for the National Liberation of Macedonia invited him and Nikolay Sevastianovich Derzhavin to serve as consultants to the First Language Commission for the codification of the Macedonian literary language. He agreed along with Derzhavin, but their participation was not realized because the codificator Blaže Koneski wanted Macedonians to make their own decisions. Bernstein was planning on publishing a book on Macedonian grammar in the 1940s, but the Tito–Stalin split made it unpublishable. Bernstein contributed to the development of Macedonian studies in Russia. Within Moscow University, there was a Macedonian language course, founded by Bernstein. He served as the chair of the section from 1947 to 1970. (Ironically, by the mid-1950s, a decade after the Section was created, Bernstein realized that Kaftanov's predictions had been wrong, as employment opportunities for Slavic majors failed to materialize. To make its graduates more employable, the department added some education coursework to the Slavic studies curriculum, so that its graduates could at least find jobs as Russian language and literature teachers in secondary schools.) In 1983, during the Congress of Slavic Studies in Kiev, the leadership of the Bulgarian Academy of Sciences urged dialectologist Maksim Mladenov to deliver a report against him.

He was a corresponding member of the Bulgarian Academy of Sciences and the Macedonian Academy of Sciences and Arts. Bernstein was a major contributor to the Atlas of the Bulgarian Dialects in the USSR, and author of dictionaries, textbooks, and numerous other works on the Bulgarian language and other Slavic and Balkan languages. His memoirs present an inside view of the Soviet academic establishment of the 1940s and 1950s. He died in 1997.

== Selected works ==
- Бернштейн С. Б. Разыскания в области болгарской исторической диалектологии. Т. I. Язык валашских грамот XIV–XV веков. (Studies in the Bulgarian historical dialectology. Vol. 1: the language of the Wallachian manuscripts of the 14-15th centuries) Moscow-Leningrad, 1948.
- Бернштейн С. Б. Зигзаги памяти: Воспоминания. Дневниковые записи. (Memories zig-zags: Memoirs and diaries). Moscow, 2002.
