= Lyubomir Miletich =

Bulgarian academic (1863–1937)

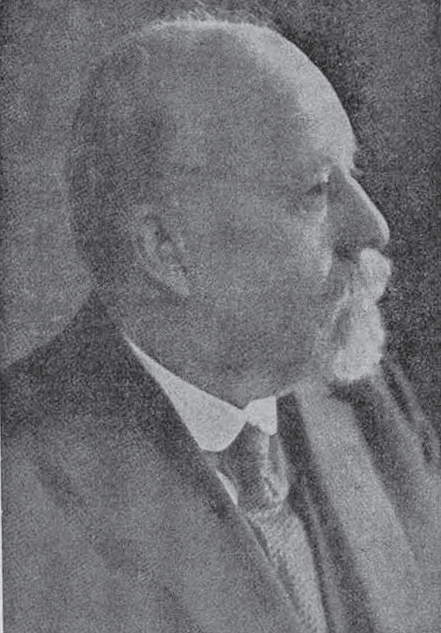
- Born: 14 January 1863; Štip, Ottoman Empire
- Died: 1 June 1937 (aged 74); Sofia, Kingdom of Bulgaria

Academic background
- Education: University of Zagreb; Charles University in Prague

Academic work
- Discipline: linguistics ethnography philology
- Institutions: University of Sofia

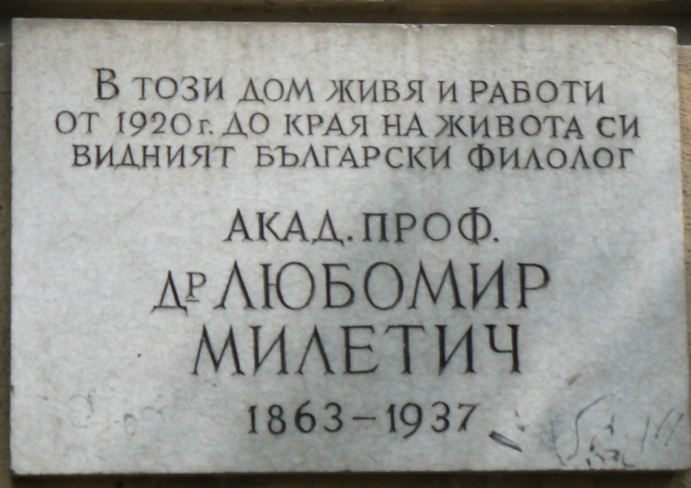
Commemorative plaque attached to the house where Miletich lived in Sofia

Lyubomir Miletich (Bulgarian: Любомир Милетич; 14 January 1863 – 1 June 1937) was a Bulgarian linguist, ethnographer, dialectologist and historian, as well as the chairman of the Bulgarian Academy of Sciences from 1926 to his death.

== Biography ==
Lyubomir Miletich was born in Štip, today in North Macedonia, to a Bulgarian family originally from Edirne (Odrin) in modern Eastern Thrace, Turkey. His great-grandfather voivode Mile had left Edirne and settled in the Austrian Banat in the early 19th century, where Lyubomir's grandfather Simo was born. Simo had two sons, Svetozar and Đorđe, Lyubomir's father, who, after briefly living in Bosnia and North Africa, returned to his homeland to become a teacher in Macedonia and northwestern Bulgaria in 1859. Miletich's mother, Evka Popdaova, was born in Veles, Macedonia.

Miletich studied in Sofia and Novi Sad, but finished school in the Zagreb Secondary School for Classical Education in 1882 and graduated in Slavistics from the University of Zagreb and Charles University in Prague, where he was taught by Jan Gebauer. Miletich participated in the foundation of Sofia University in 1888. He became a Ph.D. of philology and Slavic philology of the University of Zagreb in July 1889. Miletich become the dean of the Faculty of History and Philology of University of Sofia during the 1903–04 academic year. During the 1900–01 and 1921–22, he was the rector of the University.

Since 1898, Miletich was a member of the Bulgarian Academy of Sciences, which he presided from 1926 until his death. Similarly, he was the chairman of the Bulgarian Macedonian Scientific Institute from 1927 to his death.

Miletich was a doctor honoris causa of the Kharkiv University, a corresponding member of the Russian Academy of Sciences, as well of the Russian Historical Society, the Polish Academy of Learning, the South Slavic Academy of Sciences and Arts, the Czech Academy of Sciences, the Czech Scientific Society and the Czech Ethnographic Society, the Hungarian Ethnographic Society and the Russian Archaeological Institute.

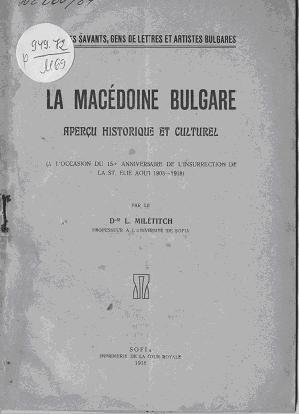
The cover of his work „La Macédoine Bulgare“, Sofia, 1918.

Miletich died in Sofia on 1 June 1937.

== Honours ==
Miletich Point on Greenwich Island in the South Shetland Islands, Antarctica, is named after Lyubomir Miletich.

== See also ==
- The Destruction of Thracian Bulgarians in 1913

Preceded by Ivan Evstatiev Geshov	Chairman of the Bulgarian Academy of Sciences; 1926–1937	Succeeded by Bogdan Filov
