= Macedonian Scientific Institute =

Research institute in Bulgaria

Page from the first statute of the Macedonian Scientific Institute from 1924

The Macedonian Scientific Institute (MSI; Bulgarian: Македонски научен институт) is a Bulgarian scientific organization, which studies the region of Macedonia and mostly the Macedonian Bulgarians. The institute issues the journal Macedonian Review.

== Establishment and activity ==
It was founded in 1923 by Macedonian Bulgarian professors and scholars at Sofia University. Two years after its establishment, the institute began to publish the journal Macedonian Review and other scientific studies on the Bulgarian population in Macedonia. The journal was concerned with Macedonia and all branches of the study of its history, culture and social life. It also espoused Bulgarian irredentism. Its first leader was Ivan Georgov. In the 1930s, the Macedonian Scientific Institute was led by Bulgarian professor Lyubomir Miletich. Under his direction, the Macedonian House of Culture in Sofia was built, where an ethnographic museum and library were established. After 1945, the activity of the MSI was changed to serve the macedonistic policy on the Macedonian Question in the People's Republic of Bulgaria and the Socialist Federal Republic of Yugoslavia. The Yugoslav authorities made a policy of removing any Bulgarian influence, making the region of Macedonia a connecting link for the establishment of new Balkan Federative Republic and creating a distinct Slav Macedonian consciousness tied to Yugoslavia. The journal Macedonian thought (published between 1945 and 1947) replaced Macedonian Review. The editors of the new journal claimed that Macedonian Review did not give a "historically truthful and scientifically grounded picture" but aimed to "serve the great Bulgarian ideology." They also condemned most former members of the organization as the representatives of the "great Bulgarian chauvinism and its weapon – the Macedonian fascism." In 1947, the Bulgarian Communist regime "recommended" the liquidation of the MSI. The archives and the whole museum collection (including the remains of the revolutionary Gotse Delchev) were transported to the newly established People's Republic of Macedonia.

== Resumption ==
After the fall of Communism in 1990, the Macedonian Scientific Institute was restored and started publishing the Macedonian Review again. Each issue now has an accompanying English translation for the contents page and article summary. The journal has emphasized the Bulgarian character of the Macedonians. It has propagated the Bulgarian side of the historical disputes over Macedonia.

The Macedonian Scientific Institute also accepted a research programme and have published new collections of documents, monographs etc. Its membership consists of academics, professors, and public figures. It has bilateral relations with other organizations and especially with the Macedonian Patriotic Organization, as well as with scholars and scientific centres in Europe, the United States, Canada and Australia. The organization is also affiliated with VMRO-BND. Its publications are translated and issued abroad. Professors Otto Kronsteiner (Austria), Tadeusz Szymański (Poland) and Heinrich Stamler (USA) were elected to be foreign corresponding members of the MSI. Scientific meetings, conferences and other activities are part of the renewed work of the Macedonian Scientific Institute. The MSI works in collaboration with the Thracian Scientific Institute, likewise a Bulgarian scientific organization which studies the region of Thrace and the Bulgarian part of its population. MSI has also developed scientific centers and branches in different cities in Bulgaria.

== Presidents of MSI ==
- 1923–1927 – Ivan Georgov, philosopher from Veles
- 1928–1937 – Lyubomir Miletich, linguist from Štip
- 1937–1944 – Nikola Stoyanov, mathematician and astronomer from Dojran
- 1945 – Dimitar Silyanovski, jurist from Kruševo
- 1945–1947 – Georgi Kulishev, jurist and politician from Dojran
- 1990–1997 – Petar Shapkarev, economist, by descent from Ohrid
- 1997–2008 – Dimitar Gotsev, historian from Pančarevo, Municipality of Pehčevo
- 2008–2014 – Trendafil Mitev, historian from Sofia
- 2014–2020 – Aleksandar Grebenarov, historian from Kardzhali
- 2020–2026 – Georgi Nikolov, historian from Sofia
- 2026 – Milen Mihov, historian from Stara Zagora

== See also ==
- Macedonia (terminology)
