= Camaldolese Bible =

Translation of the Bible into Slovak language

Camaldolese Bible (Slovak: Kamaldulská Biblia) is the first known complete translation of Bible into the Slovak language. The Bible was translated from the Vulgate by Camaldolese monks at Červený Kláštor monastery. The completed translation had been rewritten in 1756–1759. The translation is characterized by the effort to use forms and expressions of common Slovak spoken language, with distinctive Western-Slovak elements and some literary linguistic elements of Czech origin. The manuscript had been found in the Roman Catholic parish house of Cífer.
