= History of Bulgaria (1878–1946) =

After the Russo-Turkish War of 1877–1878, the 1878 Treaty of Berlin set up an autonomous state, the Principality of Bulgaria, within the Ottoman Empire. Although remaining under Ottoman sovereignty, it functioned independently, taking Alexander of Battenberg as its first prince in 1879. In 1885 Alexander took control of the still-Ottoman Eastern Rumelia, officially under a personal union. Following Prince Alexander's abdication (1886), a Bulgarian Assembly elected Ferdinand I as prince in 1887. Full independence from Ottoman control was declared in 1908.

In the 1912–1913 Balkan Wars, Bulgaria initially formed an alliance with Greece, Serbia and Montenegro against the Ottoman Empire, and together they conquered a great deal of Ottoman territory. Bulgaria, however, unhappy with the resulting division of territory, soon went to war against its former allies Serbia and Greece and lost territory it had gained in the first war. The First World War (1914–1918) saw Bulgaria fighting (1915–1918) alongside Germany, Austria-Hungary, and the Ottoman Empire. Defeat led to the Treaty of Neuilly-sur-Seine (27 November 1919), in accordance with which Bulgaria lost further territory. Social problems and political instability persisted throughout the Interwar period. In the Second World War (1939–1945), Bulgaria again allied with Germany (March 1941). Although Sofia attempted to pull out of the war as the Soviet Union advanced towards its territory (1944), the Red Army invaded (September 1944), and a communist government came to power (1944–1946) and established the People's Republic of Bulgaria (1946–1990).

== 1878–1912 ==
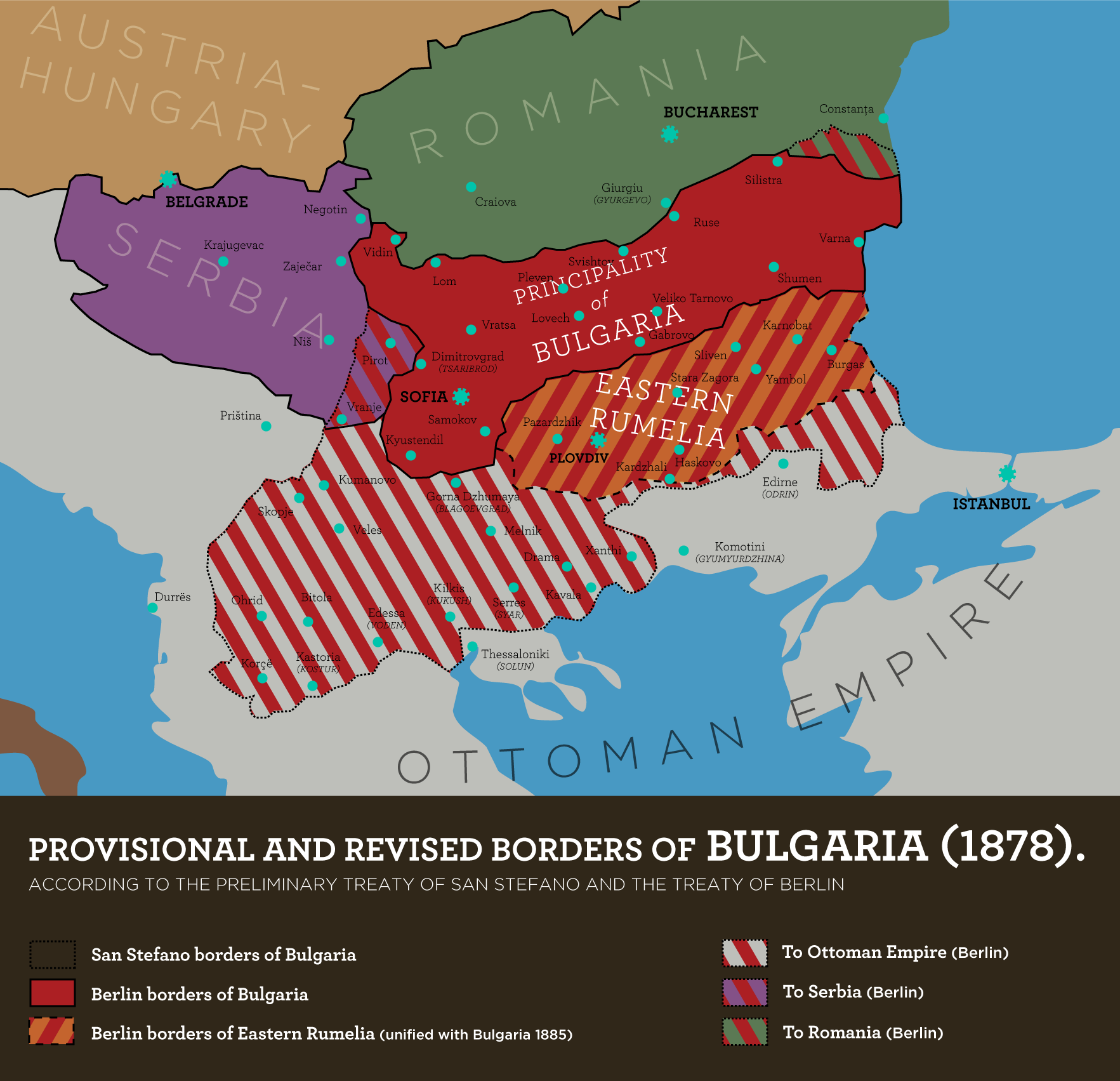
Borders of Bulgaria according to the Treaty of San Stefano of 3 March 1878 and the subsequent Treaty of Berlin

The proposed Treaty of San Stefano of March 3, 1878 provided for a self-governing Bulgarian state, which comprised the geographical regions of Moesia, Thrace and Macedonia. Fearing the establishment of a large Russian client state in the Balkans, the other Great Powers, especially Great Britain and Austria-Hungary, refused to agree to the treaty and insisted it be revised. The British were concerned over the safety of their routes to the Suez Canal and India. The sovereigns of the Austro-Hungarian Empire feared that the establishment of a large independent Slavic state in the Balkans would encourage their own Slavic subjects to seek independence.

As a result, German Chancellor Otto von Bismarck and British Prime Minister Benjamin Disraeli, supervised a revised Treaty of Berlin (1878), one that scaled back the proposed Bulgarian state. An autonomous Principality of Bulgaria was created, between the Danube and the Stara Planina range, with its seat at the old Bulgarian capital of Veliko Tarnovo, and including Sofia. This state was to be under nominal Ottoman sovereignty but was to be ruled by a prince elected by a congress of Bulgarian notables meeting in Turnovo as the Bulgarian Principality's Constituent Assembly, on February 10, 1879 and approved by the Powers. They insisted that the Prince could not be a Russian, but in a compromise Prince Alexander of Battenberg, a nephew of Tsar Alexander II, was chosen. An autonomous Ottoman province under the name of Eastern Rumelia was also created south of the Stara Planina range, whereas Macedonia reverted to the sovereignty of the Sultan.

=== Personal Union with Eastern Rumelia ===
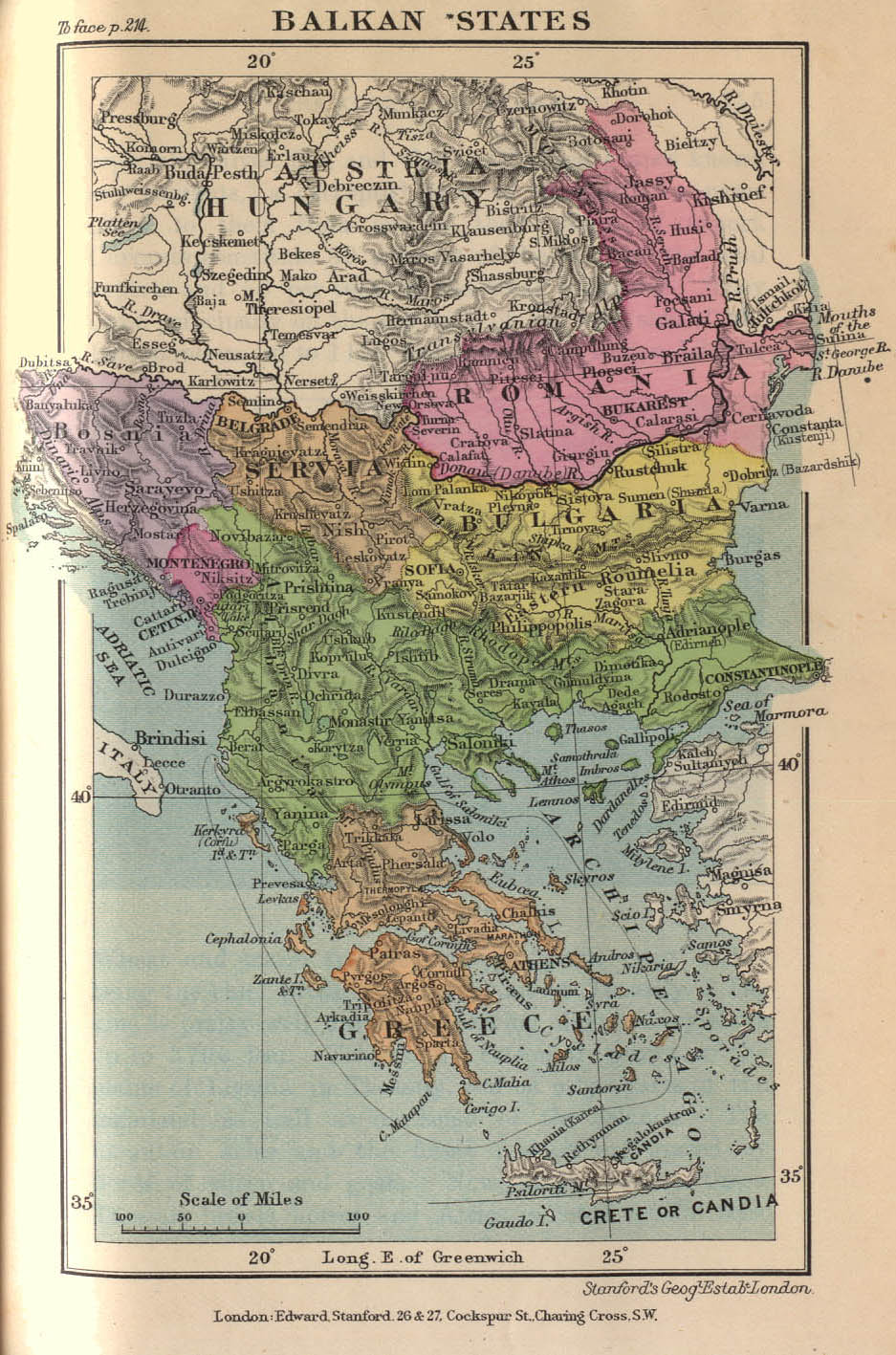
Balkan states around 1900.

The Bulgarians adopted an advanced democratic constitution, and power soon passed to the Liberal Party led by Stefan Stambolov. Prince Alexander had conservative leanings, and at first opposed Stambolov's policies, but by 1885 he had become sufficiently sympathetic to his new country to change his mind, and supported the Liberals. He also supported the Unification of Bulgaria and Eastern Rumelia, which was brought about by a coup in Plovdiv in September 1885. The Powers did not intervene because of the power struggles between them. Shortly after, Serbia declared war on Bulgaria in the hope of grabbing territory while the Bulgarians were distracted. The Bulgarians defeated them at Slivnitsa and used the momentum to launch a counterattack. The Serbian army was pushed deeply into Serbian territory, but Bulgaria was forced to halt its advance after the Austro-Hungarian Empire threatened to intervene on the Serbian side. The unification was accepted by the Powers in the form of personal union.

=== Ferdinand ===
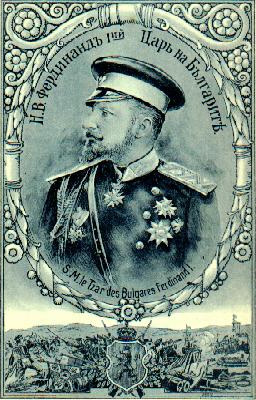
Tsar Ferdinand of Bulgaria

These events made Alexander very popular in Bulgaria, but Russia was increasingly dissatisfied with his liberal tendencies. In August 1886 they fomented a coup, in the course of which Alexander was forced to abdicate and was exiled to Russia. Stambolov, however, acted quickly and the participants in the coup were forced to flee the country. Stambolov tried to reinstate Alexander, but strong Russian opposition forced the prince to abdicate again. In July 1887 the Bulgarians elected Ferdinand of Saxe-Coburg-Gotha as their new Prince. Ferdinand was the "Austrian candidate" and the Russians refused to recognize him despite his friendship with Tsar Alexander III. Ferdinand initially worked with Stambolov, but by 1894 their relationship worsened. Stambolov resigned and was assassinated in July 1895. Ferdinand then decided to restore relations with Russia, which meant returning to a conservative policy.

In 1889, Tsar Ferdinand briefly considered moving Bulgaria's capital from Sofia to Plovdiv, due to its more central location and stronger cultural ties to Thrace. Historian Petar Dimitrov suggests that this was not done because Sofia's strategic position near the Serbian border made it a more defensible choice.

There was a substantial Bulgarian population still living under Ottoman rule, particularly in Macedonia and Adrianople. To complicate matters, Serbia and Greece too made claims over parts of Macedonia, while Serbia, as a Slavic nation, also considered Macedonians as belonging to the Serbian nation. Thus began a five-sided struggle for control of these areas which lasted until 1912. In 1903 the Ilinden–Preobrazhenie Uprising broke out in Ottoman Macedonia, making war seem likely. In the Aftermath of the Young Turk Revolution, Ferdinand used the struggles between the Great Powers to break free from Ottoman suzerainty. On October 5, Ferdinand declared the Independence of the Tsardom of Bulgaria at the Holy Forty Martyrs Church in Veliko Tarnovo, although since the introduction of the Gregorian calendar in 1916, this has been celebrated on September 22.

=== Ilinden Uprising ===
The main external political problem confronting Bulgaria throughout the period up to World War I was the fate of Macedonia and Eastern Thrace. At the end of 19th century the Internal Macedonian-Adrianople Revolutionary Organization was founded and began the preparation of an armed uprising in the regions still occupied by the Ottoman Turks. Relying in part on nationwide support on the part of the Principality of Bulgaria, IMARO got down to organizing a network of committees in Macedonia and Thrace. On 2 August 1903 a mass armed uprising, known in history as the Ilinden–Preobrazhenie Uprising, broke out in Macedonia and Thrace. Its aim was to liberate those regions, or at least to draw the attention of the Great Powers and make them advocate for the improvement of the living conditions for the population through legal and economic reforms. After three months of fierce battles the Ottoman army crushed the uprising using much cruelty against the civilian population.

== Balkan Wars ==
In 1911 the Nationalist Prime Minister, Ivan Evstratiev Geshov, set about forming an alliance with Greece and Serbia, and the three allies agreed to put aside their rivalries to plan a joint attack on the Ottomans.

In February 1912 a secret treaty was signed between Bulgaria and Serbia, and in May 1912 a similar treaty was signed with Greece. Montenegro was also brought into the pact. The treaties provided for the partition of Macedonia and Thrace between the allies, although the lines of partition were left dangerously vague. After the Ottomans refused to implement reforms in the disputed areas, the First Balkan War broke out in October 1912. (See Balkan Wars for details.)

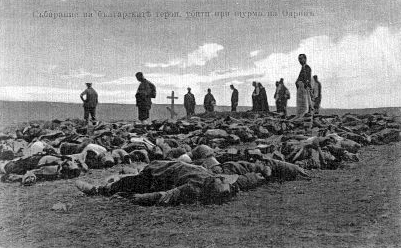
Bulgarian dead in the Balkan Wars

The allies had an astonishing success. The Bulgarian army inflicted several defeats on the Ottoman forces and advanced threateningly against Istanbul, while the Serbs and the Greeks took control of Macedonia. The Ottomans sued for peace in December. Negotiations broke down, and fighting resumed in February 1913. The Ottomans lost Adrianople to a combined Bulgarian-Serbian task force. A second armistice followed in March, with the Ottomans losing all their European possessions west of the Midia-Enos line, not far from Istanbul. Bulgaria gained possession of most of Thrace, including Adrianople and the Aegean port of Dedeagach (today Alexandroupoli). Bulgaria also gained a slice of Macedonia, north and east of Thessaloniki (which went to Greece), but only some small areas along her western borders.

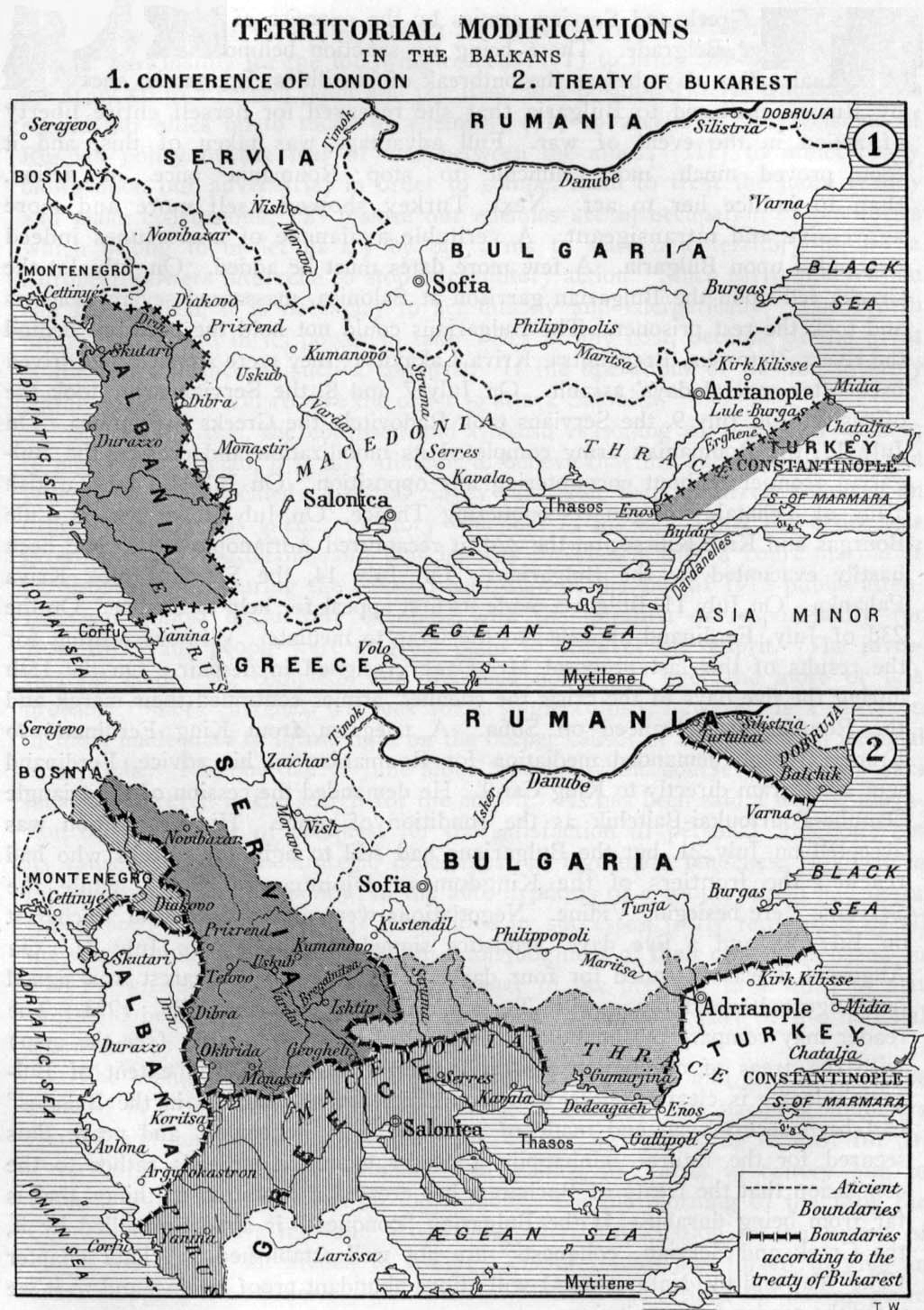
Boundaries on the Balkans after the First and the Second Balkan War (1912–1913)

Bulgaria sustained the heaviest casualties of any of the allies, and on this basis felt entitled to the largest share of the spoils. The Serbs in particular did not see things this way, and refused to vacate any of the territory they had seized in northern Macedonia (that is, the territory roughly corresponding to the modern North Macedonia), stating that the Bulgarian army had failed to accomplish its pre-war goals at Adrianople (i. e., failing to capture it without Serbian help) and that the pre-war agreements on the division of Macedonia had to be revised. Some circles in Bulgaria inclined toward going to war with Serbia and Greece on this issue. In June 1913 Serbia and Greece formed a new alliance, against Bulgaria. The Serbian Prime Minister, Nikola Pašić, told Greece it could have Thrace if Greece helped Serbia keep Bulgaria out of Serbian part of Macedonia, and the Greek Prime Minister Eleftherios Venizelos agreed. Seeing this as a violation of the pre-war agreements, and discreetly encouraged by Germany and Austria-Hungary, war was declared by Tsar Ferdinand on Serbia and Greece, and the Bulgarian army attacked on June 29. The Serbian and the Greek forces were initially on the retreat on the western border, but they soon took the upper hand and forced Bulgaria into retreat. The fighting was very harsh, with many casualties, especially during the key Battle of Bregalnica. Soon Romania entered the war and attacked Bulgaria from the north. The Ottoman Empire also attacked from the south-east. The war was now definitely lost for Bulgaria, which had to abandon most of her claims of Macedonia to Serbia and Greece, while the revived Ottomans retook Adrianople. Romania took possession of southern Dobruja.

== War and social conflict ==
=== World War I ===
In the aftermath of the Balkan Wars Bulgarian opinion turned against Russia and the western powers, whom the Bulgarians felt had done nothing to help them. The government of Vasil Radoslavov aligned Bulgaria with Germany and Austria-Hungary, even though this meant also becoming an ally of the Ottomans, Bulgaria's traditional enemy. But Bulgaria now had no claims against the Ottomans, whereas Serbia, Greece and Romania (allies of Britain and France) were all in possession of lands perceived in Bulgaria as Bulgarian. Bulgaria was content to sit on the fence and observe the fortunes of war before deciding whether to declare their sympathies. Bulgaria, recuperating from the Balkan Wars, sat out the first year of World War I, but when Germany promised to restore the boundaries of the Treaty of San Stefano, Bulgaria, which had the largest army in the Balkans, declared war on Serbia in October 1915. Britain, France and Italy then declared war on Bulgaria.

Although Bulgaria, in alliance with Germany, Austria-Hungary and the Ottomans, won military victories against Serbia and Romania, occupying much of Macedonia (taking Skopje in October), advancing into Greek Macedonia, and taking Dobruja from the Romanians in September 1916, the war soon became unpopular with the majority of Bulgarian people, who suffered great economic hardship and also disliked fighting their fellow Orthodox Christians in alliance with the Muslim Ottomans. The Agrarian Party leader, Aleksandar Stamboliyski, was imprisoned for his opposition to the war. The Russian Revolution of February 1917 had a great effect in Bulgaria, spreading antiwar and anti-monarchist sentiment among the troops and in the cities. Membership in socialist parties in Bulgaria boomed. However, the socialists in Bulgaria were badly split ideologically. One group sought to work with other political parties representing other classes in order to be effective in bringing change to Bulgaria. Because of their "broad outlook" they were known as the "Broad Socialists." The second group, the "Narrow Socialists," were purists and refused to work with parties of different classes. In 1919 the Narrow Socialists were reorganized as the Bulgarian Communist Party, leaving the hitherto disputed label of "Bulgarian Social Democratic Workers' Party" to the Broads.

In June, 1919, Radoslavov's government resigned. Mutinies broke out in the army, Stamboliyski was released from prison and a republic was proclaimed.

=== Interwar years ===
In September 1918 the Serbs, British, French and Greeks broke through on the Macedonian front and Tsar Ferdinand was forced to sue for peace. Stamboliyski favoured democratic reforms, not a revolution. Alexander Stamboliyski made his first appearance on the Bulgarian political scene in 1903 as member of the Bulgarian Agrarian National Union (BANU). In 1902 two agrarian newspapers were merged to form Zemedelsko Zname (Agrarian Banner) which became the voice of BANU. In 1906 Stamboliyski became the Editor of Zemedelsko Zname The poor harvest and hard times of 1907 brought BANU to the fore again. In the 1908 elections BANU received 11.2% of the vote and obtained 23 seats in Bulgaria's unicameral parliament. In the August 1919 elections, BANU received 31.02% of the vote. In order to head off the revolutionaries, Stamboliyski persuaded Ferdinand to abdicate in favour of his son Boris III. The revolutionaries were suppressed and the army disbanded. Under the Treaty of Neuilly-sur-Seine (November 1919), Bulgaria lost its Aegean coastline to Greece and nearly all of its Macedonian territory to the new state of Yugoslavia, and had to give Dobruja back to the Romanians (see also Dobruja, Western Outlands, Western Thrace). Elections in March 1920 gave the Agrarians a large majority, and Stamboliyski formed Bulgaria's first genuinely democratic government.

Stamboliyski faced huge social problems in what was still a poor country inhabited mostly by peasant smallholders. Bulgaria was saddled with huge war reparations to Yugoslavia and Romania, and had to deal with the problem of refugees as pro-Bulgarian Macedonians had to leave the Yugoslav Macedonia. Nevertheless, Stamboliyski was able to carry through many social reforms, although opposition from the Tsar, the landlords and the officers of the much-reduced but still influential army was powerful. Another bitter enemy was the Internal Macedonian Revolutionary Organization (VMRO), which favoured a war to regain Macedonia for Bulgaria. Faced with this array of enemies, Stamboliyski allied himself with the Bulgarian Communist Party and opened relations with the Soviet Union.

In March 1923 Stamboliyski signed an agreement with Yugoslavia recognising the new border and agreeing to suppress VMRO. This triggered a nationalist reaction, and on 9 June there was a coup after which Stamboliykski was assassinated (beheaded). A right wing government under Aleksandar Tsankov took power, backed by the Tsar, the army and the VMRO, who waged a White terror against the Agrarians and the Communists. The Communist leader Georgi Dimitrov fled to the Soviet Union. There was savage repression in 1925 following the second of two failed attempts on the Tsar's life in the bomb attack on Sofia Cathedral (the first attempt took place in the mountain pass of Arabakonak). But in 1926 the Tsar persuaded Tsankov to resign and a more moderate government under Andrey Lyapchev took office. An amnesty was proclaimed, although the Communists remained banned. The Agrarians reorganised and won elections in 1931 under the leadership of Nikola Mushanov.

Just when political stability had been restored, the full effects of the Great Depression hit Bulgaria, and social tensions rose again. In May 1934 there was another coup, the Agrarians were again suppressed, and an authoritarian regime headed by Kimon Georgiev established with the backing of Tsar Boris. In April 1935 Boris took power himself, ruling through puppet Prime Ministers Georgi Kyoseivanov (1935–1940) and Bogdan Filov (1940–1943). The Tsar's regime banned all opposition parties and took Bulgaria into alliance with Nazi Germany and Fascist Italy. Although the signing of the Balkan Pact of 1938 restored good relations with Yugoslavia and Greece, the territorial issue continued to simmer.

== World War II and after ==
Under Filov's government Bulgaria drifted into World War II, faced by an invasion and bribed by the return of southern Dobruja from Romania, on the orders of Hitler (see Second Vienna Award), in September 1940. In March 1941 Bulgaria formally signed the Tripartite Pact and German troops entered the country in preparation for the Axis invasions of Greece and Yugoslavia. When Yugoslavia and Greece were defeated, Bulgaria was allowed to occupy all of Greek Thrace and most of Macedonia. Bulgaria declared war on Britain and the United States, but resisted German pressure to declare war on the Soviet Union, fearful of pro-Russian sentiment in the country.

In August 1943 Tsar Boris died suddenly after returning from Germany (possibly assassinated, although this has never been proved) and was succeeded by his six-year-old son Simeon II. Power was held by a council of regents headed by the young Tsar's uncle, Prince Kirill. The new prime minister, Dobri Bozhilov, was in most respects a German puppet.

Resistance to the Germans and the Bulgarian regime was widespread by 1943, co-ordinated mainly by the Communists. Together with the Agrarians, now led by Nikola Petkov, the Social Democrats and even with many army officers they founded the Fatherland Front. Partisans operated in the mountainous west and south. By 1944 it was obvious that Germany was losing the war and the regime began to look for a way out. Bozhilov resigned in May, and his successor Ivan Ivanov Bagryanov tried to arrange negotiations with the western Allies.

Meanwhile, the capital Sofia was bombed by Allied aircraft in late 1943 and early 1944, with raids on other major cities following later.

=== Communist coup ===
But it was the Soviet army which was rapidly advancing towards Bulgaria. In August 1944, Bulgaria unilaterally announced its withdrawal from the war and asked the German troops to leave: Bulgarian troops were hastily withdrawn from Greece and Yugoslavia. In September the Soviets crossed the northern border. The government, in a desperate attempt at avoiding a Soviet occupation, declared war on Germany, but the Soviets could not be put off, and on September 8 they declared war on Bulgaria – which thus found itself for a few days at war with both Germany and the Soviet Union. On September 16, the Soviet army entered Sofia.

The Fatherland Front took office in Sofia following a coup d'état, setting up a broad coalition under the former ruler Kimon Georgiev and including the Social Democrats and the Agrarians. Under the terms of the peace settlement, Bulgaria was allowed to keep Southern Dobruja, but formally renounced all claims to Greek and Yugoslav territory. To prevent further disputes 150,000 Bulgarians were expelled from Greek Thrace. The Communists deliberately took a minor role in the new government at first, but the Soviet representatives were the real power in the country. A Communist-controlled People's Militia was set up, which harassed and intimidated non-Communist parties.

In February 1945 the new realities of power in Bulgaria were shown when Prince Kirill and hundreds of other officials of the old regime were arrested on charges of war crimes. By June Kirill and the other regents, 22 former ministers and many others had been executed. In September 1946 the monarchy was abolished by plebiscite, and young Tsar Simeon was sent into exile. The Communists now openly took power, with Vasil Kolarov becoming president and Dimitrov becoming prime minister. Free elections promised for 1946 were boycotted by the opposition, and in November 1945, the Fatherland Front won in a single-party election. The Agrarians refused to co-operate with the new regime, and in June 1947 their leader Nikola Petkov was arrested. Despite strong international protests he was executed in September. This marked the final establishment of a Communist regime in Bulgaria.

=== The Holocaust ===
After a series of anti-Jewish legislation starting in 1940 (e.g. Jews were excluded from public service, banned from certain areas, restricted economically, and not allowed to intermarry; see The Law for Protection of the Nation), Bulgaria ultimately deported some portions of the Jewish population under its control. Bulgaria deported over 7000 Jews from Macedonia which was under their occupation. Plans were made to deport Jews in 1943, and 20,000 were expelled from Sofia, but protests (initiated by Dimitar Peshev) from political and clerical leaders stopped further cooperation, saving all of the 50,000 Jews in the country. However, in March 1943 almost 12,000 Jews in Thrace and Macedonia, were deported to Auschwitz and Treblinka, where they were murdered.

== Social history ==
=== Agrarianism ===
Bulgaria emerged from Turkish rule as a poor, underdeveloped agricultural country, with little industry or natural resources. Most of the land was owned by small farmers, with peasants comprising 80% of the population of 3.8 million in 1900. The few Turkish nobles left and large land holdings were uncommon, but there were many poor peasants living on the margins. Agrarianism was the dominant political philosophy in the countryside, as the peasantry organized a movement independent of any existing party. In 1899, the Bulgarian Agrarian Union was formed, bringing together rural intellectuals such as teachers with ambitious peasants. It promoted modern farming practices, as well as elementary education.

=== Education ===
The government promoted modernization, with special emphasis on building a network of elementary and secondary schools. By 1910, there were 4,800 elementary schools, 330 lyceums, 27 high schools, and 113 vocational schools. From 1878 to 1933 France funded numerous libraries, research institutes, and Catholic schools throughout Bulgaria. The main aims were to disseminate French culture and the French language and to gain prestige and business for France. Indeed, French became the primary foreign language in Bulgaria and the wealthy typically sent their children to elite Roman Catholic French language schools taught by Frenchmen. The prosperous Greek community of southern Bulgaria set up their own network of Greek language primary and secondary schools that promoted Hellenism in order to counter the threat of assimilation into Bulgarian society. In 1888, a university was established. It was renamed the University of Sofia in 1904, where the three faculties of history and philology, physics and mathematics, and law produced civil servants for national and local government offices. It became the center of German and Russian intellectual, philosophical and theological influences.

=== Turks ===
While most Turkish officials, landowners, businessmen and professionals left after 1878, some Turkish peasant villages persisted, comprising perhaps as much as 10% of Bulgaria's population. They were largely self-governing, continued their traditional religion and language, and were tolerated by the Bulgarian government until the 1970s. They were protected as a minority group under international law by various treaties and agreements, including the Treaty of Berlin (1878). For over a century, this protection enabled Bulgaria's Turks to develop separate religious and cultural organizations, schools, a local Turkish press, and a literature.

=== Urbanization ===
The first decade of the century saw sustained prosperity, with steady urban growth. The capital of Sofia grew by a factor of 600% from 20,000 population in 1878 to 120,000 in 1912, primarily from peasants who arrived from the villages to become labourers tradesmen and office seekers. Refugees from Turkish Macedonia also arrived, while there was relatively little emigration. Ethnic diversity characterized Bulgaria, with an Orthodox Bulgarian base, and numerous enclaves of Turks, Greeks and others. Bulgarian revolutionaries from the Macedonian area (then under Ottoman rule) used Bulgaria as a base, beginning in 1894, to agitate for a formal independence from the Ottoman Empire in order to later more easily reunite Macedonia and Bulgaria. They launched a poorly planned uprising in 1903 that was brutally suppressed, and led to tens of thousands of additional refugees pouring into Bulgaria.

== See also ==
- Bulgarian irredentism
- Bulgarian unification
- European balance of power#19th century
- History of Europe#Nations rising
  - Bulgarian National Revival and National awakening of Bulgaria
- September Uprising

== Bibliography ==
- Glenny, Misha (1999), The Balkans: Nationalism, War and the Great Powers, 1804–1999, New York: Viking Press.
