= Georgi Kulishev =

Bulgarian lawyer, journalist, editor, and statesman

- Георги Кулишев
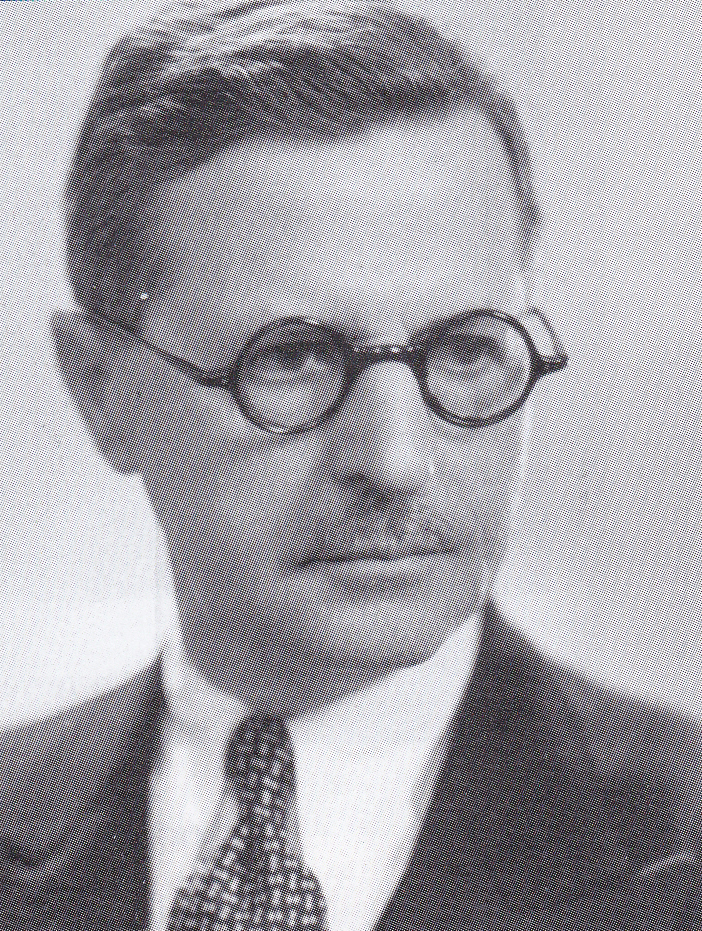
- Kulishev in 1950

Minister of Foreign Affairs of Bulgaria
- In office 22 November 1946 – 31 March 1946
- Preceded by: Petko Staynov
- Succeeded by: Kimon Georgiev

Personal details
- Born: Georgi Kulishev Gugov; 21 September 1885 Dojran, Ottoman Empire
- Died: 27 September 1974 (aged 89) Sofia, Bulgaria
- Party: Zveno
- Other political affiliations: Internal Macedonian Revolutionary Organization; Fatherland Front
- Education: Sofia University
- Profession: Lawyer, journalist, academic

Georgi Kulishev Gugov (Bulgarian: Георги Кулишев Гугов; 21 September 1885 – 27 September 1974) was a Bulgarian lawyer, journalist and statesman. Originally a member of the Internal Macedonian Revolutionary Organization, he later served in prominent government positions during the Bulgarian People's Republic.

== Biography ==
He was born in the town of Dojran in the region of Macedonia. After graduating from the gymnasium in Thessaloniki in 1905, he worked as a teacher. At that time, he became involved with the Internal Macedonian-Adrianople Revolutionary Organization (IMRO). In 1905, at the congress of Macedonian revolutionary activists, he was elected a member of the Salonica revolutionary committee. In 1906 he was arrested and placed in the Yedi Kule prison in Thessaloniki.

In 1908, after the outbreak of the Young Turk revolution, Kulishev took part in the creation of the Union of Bulgarian Constitutional Clubs and was active in the Salonica office of the Union. During the Balkan Wars, he edited the newspaper Balgarin (Bulgarian). After the end of the wars, he completed his law studies at Sofia University. He wrote for the magazine Rodina (Homeland) and started working at the Bulgarian Ministry of Foreign Affairs. In 1921–1922 he worked as secretary of the Bulgarian legation in Istanbul. In 1923, he was a founding member of the Macedonian Scientific Institute.

From June 1920 he was active in the Masonic lodge Swietlina. He collaborated with Macedonian-themed magazines, such as Slova, Makedonia and Vardar. In 1927 he won a seat in the parliament. After the end of his term in 1931, he emigrated to Switzerland.

In 1933 he returned to Bulgaria and joined the Zveno group. After the coup on May 19, 1934, he headed the censorship department at the Directorate of Social Renewal and was the editor of the journal Nowi dni. In 1938 he was elected a deputy to the Bulgarian parliament, but his election was eventually annulled.

From 1943 he associated with the Fatherland Front. In 1944 he became the editor-in-chief of the Izgrev magazine. After the coup on September 9, 1944, he served as secretary of the Council of Ministers. After Petyr Popzlatev was removed from Zveno's leadership (under pressure from the communists), Kulishev took his place in the authorities of the Fatherland Front. On March 31, 1946, he was appointed Minister of Foreign Affairs. He held this position until November 22, 1946. He participated in the Paris Peace Conference (1946).

In the years 1950–1974 he was a deputy to the National Assembly for six consecutive terms.

Political offices
Preceded by Petko Staynov	Minister of Foreign Affairs of Bulgaria; 1946	Succeeded by Kimon Georgiev
