= Military League =

Military League may refer to:

- Military League (Greece), a group of Greek officers formed in 1908 that participated in the 1909 Goudi coup
- Military League (Bulgaria), a group of Bulgarian officers formed in 1919 that participated in the 1923 Bulgarian coup d'état
