= Andrey Toshev =

Bulgarian scientist, politician and diplomat

- Андрей Тошев
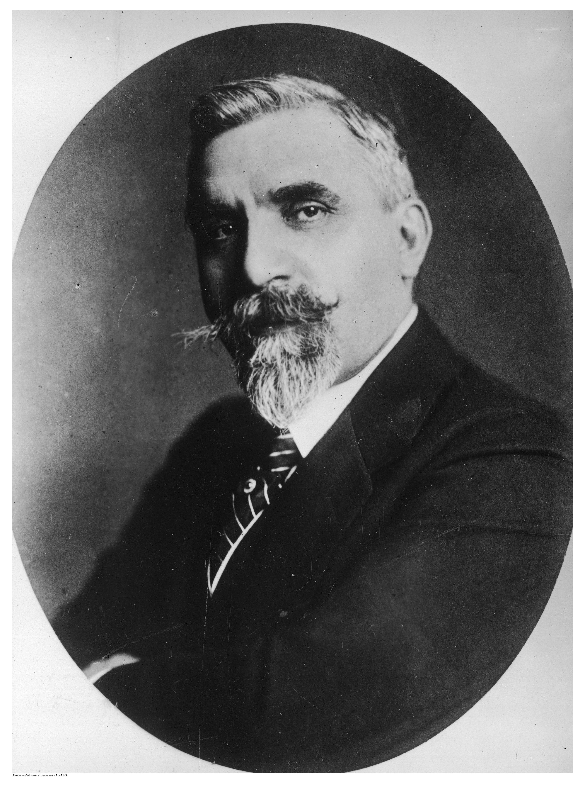
- Toshev in 1930

26th Prime Minister of Bulgaria
- In office 21 April 1935 – 23 November 1935
- Monarch: Boris III
- Preceded by: Pencho Zlatev
- Succeeded by: Georgi Kyoseivanov

Personal details
- Born: 16 April 1867 Stara Zagora, Ottoman Empire
- Died: 10 January 1944 (aged 76) Sofia, Bulgaria
- Party: Non-Party
- Profession: Diplomat

Andrey Slavov Toshev (Bulgarian: Андрей Славов Тошев; 16 April 1867 – 10 January 1944) was Prime Minister of Bulgaria in 1935. He was also a Bulgarian scientist and a diplomat. Toshev was a professor of botany.

Appointed by Tsar Boris III, Toshev was chosen for his unflinching loyalty in the uncertainty following the counter coup by Boris loyalists against the government of Zveno that had assumed power in a coup the previous year. He headed a purely civilian cabinet after a period of military rule and was, in effect, a puppet of the Tsar. Indeed, at 68 years of age, the Premiership was Toshev's first major political role. His task was to contain the military, work on the constitution, and to construct a new popular movement. His Premiership proved short-lived since he made no progress on any of those fronts by November. At that time, it was discovered that Damyan Velchev had slipped back into the country — presumably with the intention of conspiring against the king — and Toshev was replaced by Georgi Kyoseivanov.

Toshev also served in diplomatic roles as the Bulgarian ambassador to the Principality of Montenegro (1905-1906), to Greece (1906-1908), to Serbia from 1909 to 1913, in which capacity he helped bring about the formation of the Balkan League.

He was also as the Bulgarian ambassador to Ottoman Empire in Constantinople from 1913 to 1914 and instrumental in negotiating the Treaty of Constantinople.

He was then in Switzerland (1915-1916), in Austria-Hungary (1917-1919), and Austria in 1919 after World War 1.

Political offices
Preceded by Pencho Zlatev	Prime Minister of Bulgaria; 1935	Succeeded by Georgi Kyoseivanov
