= Kimon Georgiev =

Prime Minister of Bulgaria (1934–35, 1944–46)

- Кимон Георгиев
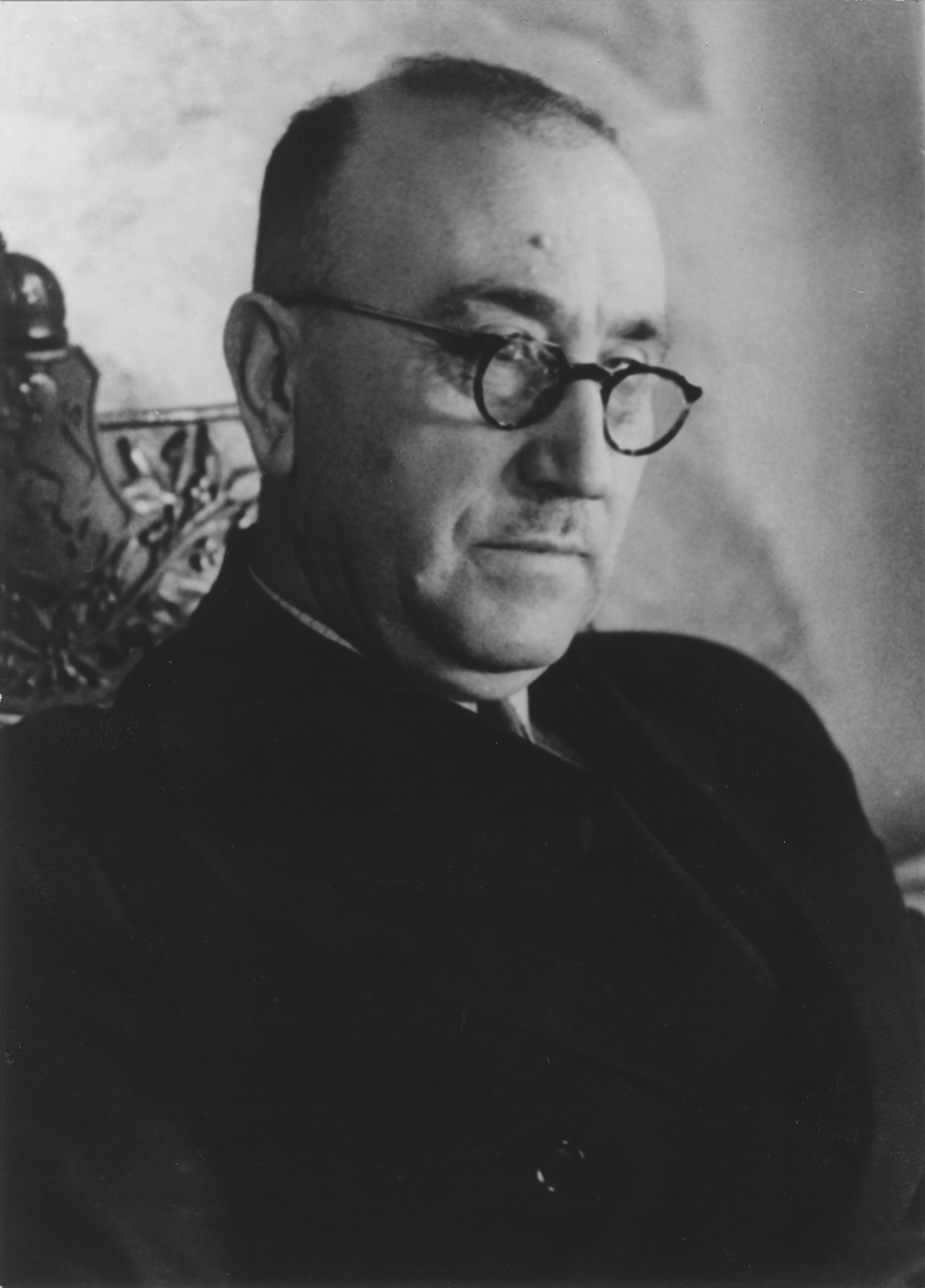

24th Prime Minister of Bulgaria
- In office 19 May 1934 – 22 January 1935
- Monarch: Boris III
- Preceded by: Nikola Mushanov
- Succeeded by: Pencho Zlatev
- In office 9 September 1944 – 22 November 1946
- Monarch: Simeon II (1944–1946)
- President: Vasil Kolarov (1946)
- Preceded by: Konstantin Muraviev
- Succeeded by: Georgi Dimitrov

Personal details
- Born: 11 August 1882 Pazardzhik, Eastern Rumelia (modern-day Bulgaria)
- Died: 28 September 1969 (aged 87) Varna, Bulgaria
- Party: People's Alliance; Democratic Alliance; Zveno
- Other political affiliations: Fatherland Front
- Spouse: Veska Rodeva
- Children: Maria Georgieva, Kornelia Georgieva
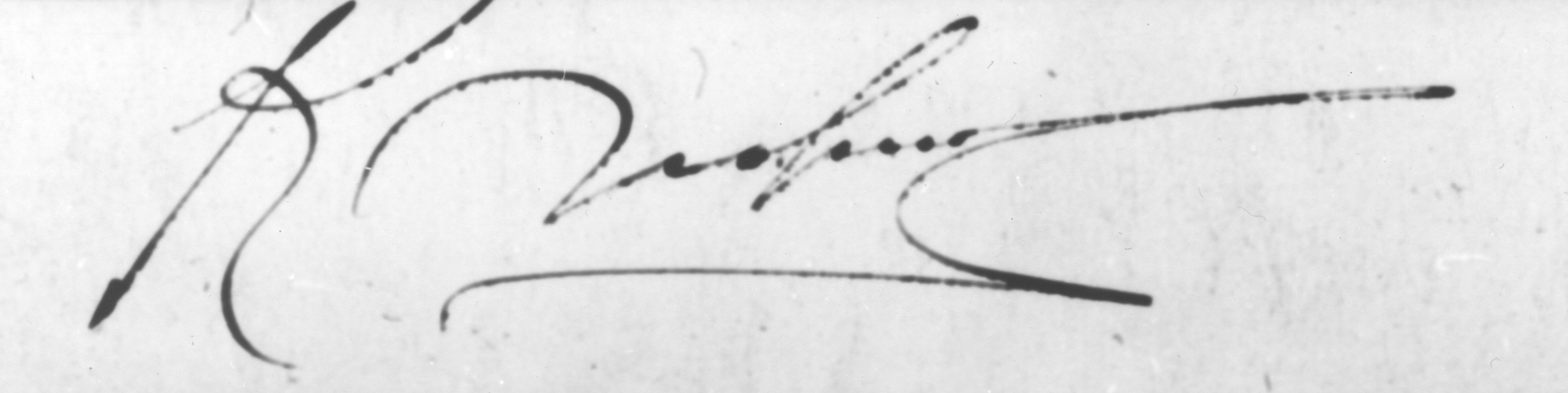
- Signature
- Nickname: Стария превратаджия (The old coup-maker)

Military service
- Branch/service: Bulgarian Army
- Years of service: 1902–1935
- Rank: Colonel General

Shoulder Board of Kimon Georgiev as lieutenant colonel

Kimon Georgiev Stoyanov (Bulgarian: Кимон Георгиев Стоянов; August 11, 1882 – September 28, 1969) was a Bulgarian general who was the Prime Minister of the Kingdom of Bulgaria from 1934 to 1935 and again from 1944 to 1946. He was considered a "master in the art of coup d'états".

== Early life ==
=== Early life and education ===
Kimon Georgiev Stoyanov was born on 11 August 1882 in the town of Tatar Pazardzhik, then part of Eastern Rumelia, into a middle-class family. He was nicknamed "The Greek" because his mother was of Greek descent.

His paternal grandfather, called Stoyan Balkachiyata, moved to the town from the village of Debrashtitsa in the early 19th century. His father was Georgi Stoyanov Krustyov, born around 1848. His maternal grandfather was Todor Bogdanov, who came to Pazardzhik from the village of Kalugerovo. His mother was Maria Bogdanova-Abadzhieva, born around 1858. He had an older brother and sister, so he was the youngest child in his family. At the time, his father died of tuberculosis only three months after his birth.

He graduated primary education in Pazardzhik in 1897. He was firstly interested in engineering, but his family couldn't afford to study abroad, so they later directed him into starting his military career, where he was accepted into the Military University in Sofia.

He graduated in 1902 and was promoted to second-lieutenant on 1 January 1902 at an official ceremony in the Tsar's Palace. He was also a commander in the 3rd Reserve Regiment of the 2nd Infantry Thracian Division in Peshtera, then moved to Pazardzhik. There, he was promoted to lieutenant in 1905 and then commander.

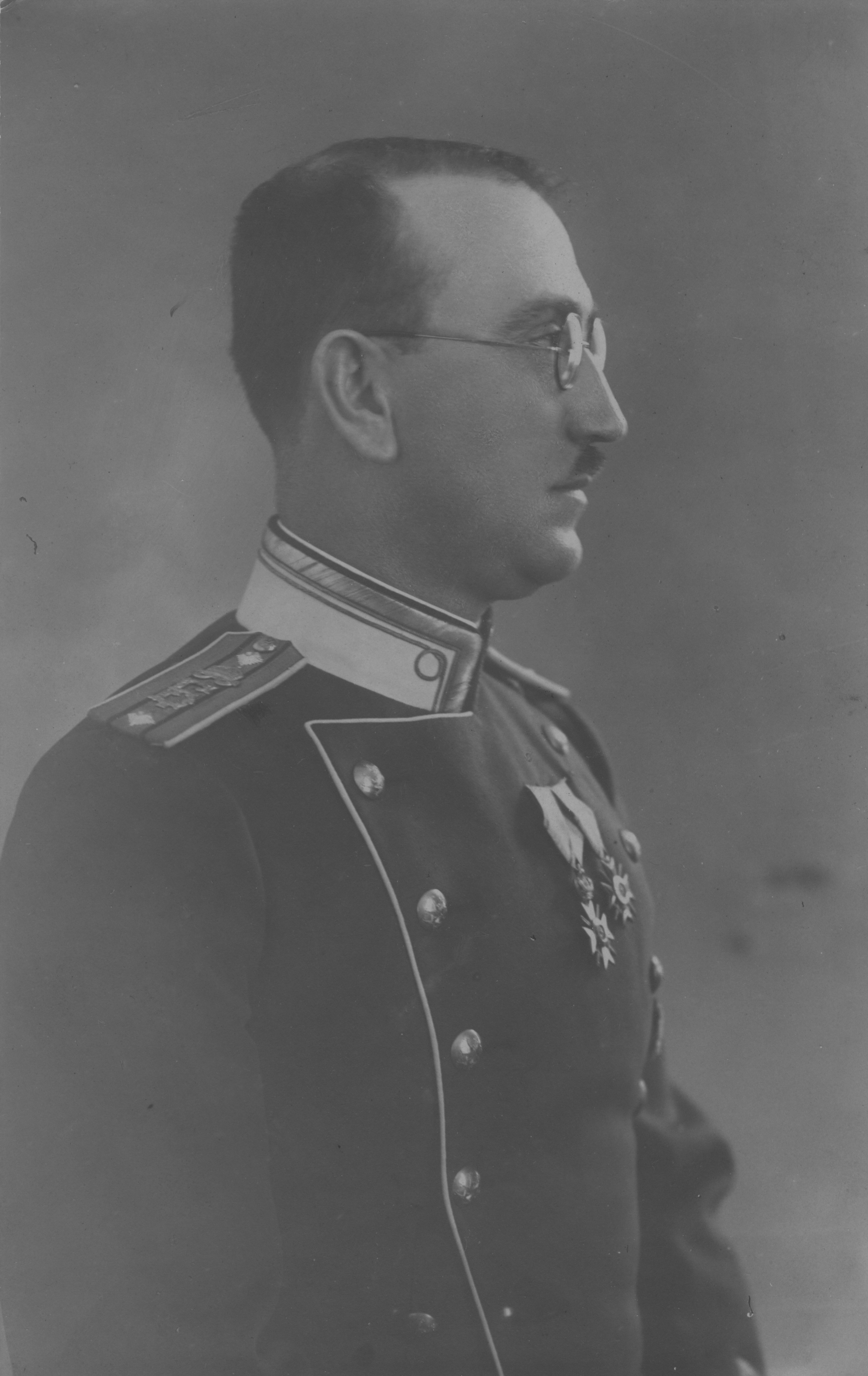
Georgiev in his military uniform

=== Balkan Wars ===
On mobilization on the eve of the First Balkan War, Kimon Georgiev became commander of the 2nd Company of the 27th Chepinski Infantry Regiment in Pazardzhik, which was shortly afterwards transferred to the frontier at Ladzhene. The regiment was part of the Rhodope detachment commanded by General Stiliyan Kovachev and after the outbreak of the war in early October advanced westwards towards Mehomiya. Georgiev's company was among the units that captured Predela and moved briefly into the Struma Valley, supporting the advance of the Seventh Rila Infantry Division, then returned via Bansko and continued south through Breznitsa, Nevrokop, Sadovo and Banitsa to Serres. From Serres, the Twenty-seventh Regiment advanced rapidly towards Salonika, but was halted after Xylopoli, as the Seventh Division and Greek troops were already in the city. He was then promoted to captain in 1913 and then appointed as a commander of an infantry regiment in Kardzhali.

=== World War I ===
During the mobilization when Bulgaria entered World War I, Kimon Georgiev became a company commander in the newly formed Forty-fourth Infantry Tundzhan Regiment and shortly after was appointed commander of its 2nd Troop. The regiment was part of the Second Infantry Thracian Division under the command of General Dimitar Geshov and fought on the Salonika front. Georgiev distinguished himself in the fighting at Kayali, where he would capture 316 British soldiers, in which became a major in 1916.

He participated in the Battle of the Crna Bend, where his detachment was in key positions at the village of Brod and the mouth of the Sakuleva River, which it occupied on 8 October. During the following days it was subjected to intense artillery shelling and repeated attacks by Entente forces, with Georgiev proving to be an effective field officer, holding off the enemy on the opposite bank of the Cherna. On 19 October, he lost one eye and severely wounded.

After recovering from his wound, Kimon Georgiev was appointed as an instructor and then as a member of the Ordnance Council at the headquarters of the army. On 27 February 1918, he was promoted to lieutenant-colonel. During demobilization after the Armistice of Salonica, he was transferred to the War Ministry, and from 26 October 1918 was head of the Inspectorate Section.

Kimon Georgiev became a member of the Military Union after the returning of headquarters of the army in Sofia and headed its organization for the Sofia garrison. He actively participated in the preparation of its Founding Congress, at which he was elected a member of the first Permanent Presence of the organization. On 2 November 1919, he was appointed commander of the sixth infantry regiment in Sofia.

Over 100 officers protested against the appointment of Gavril Lichev as head of the War Office on 9 September 1919. This action provoked a reaction from Prime Minister Aleksandar Stamboliyski, who also was Minister of War. The Supreme Military Council condemned the action and took measures to dissolute the Military Union. On the same day, Georgiev was appointed commander of the 39th regiment in Burgas on the pretext that he was unfit for enlistment. He went on leave, but the command wanted to remove him from Sofia and terminated his leave. On 12 October 1919, he submitted a request to be dismissed. On his dismissal from the army, he was promoted to colonel. He left the military in 1920.

== Early political career ==
=== Military Union and People's Alliance ===
The dismissal of Kimon Georgiev was followed by the purge of other key figures of the Union by the end of 1920. Despite the government's measures, the Military Union was gradually restored with the active efforts of Nikola Rachev, Damyan Velchev and Kimon Georgiev - the structure of the organization in the army was reorganized, with fewer people involved in its activities, but under a tighter conspiracy.

His political career started in 1921, where he was one of the founders of the organization People's Alliance and kept ties with the Military Union. He also participated in the negotiation ties between opposition parties to create the Constitutional Bloc in 1922.

=== 1923 coup d'état ===
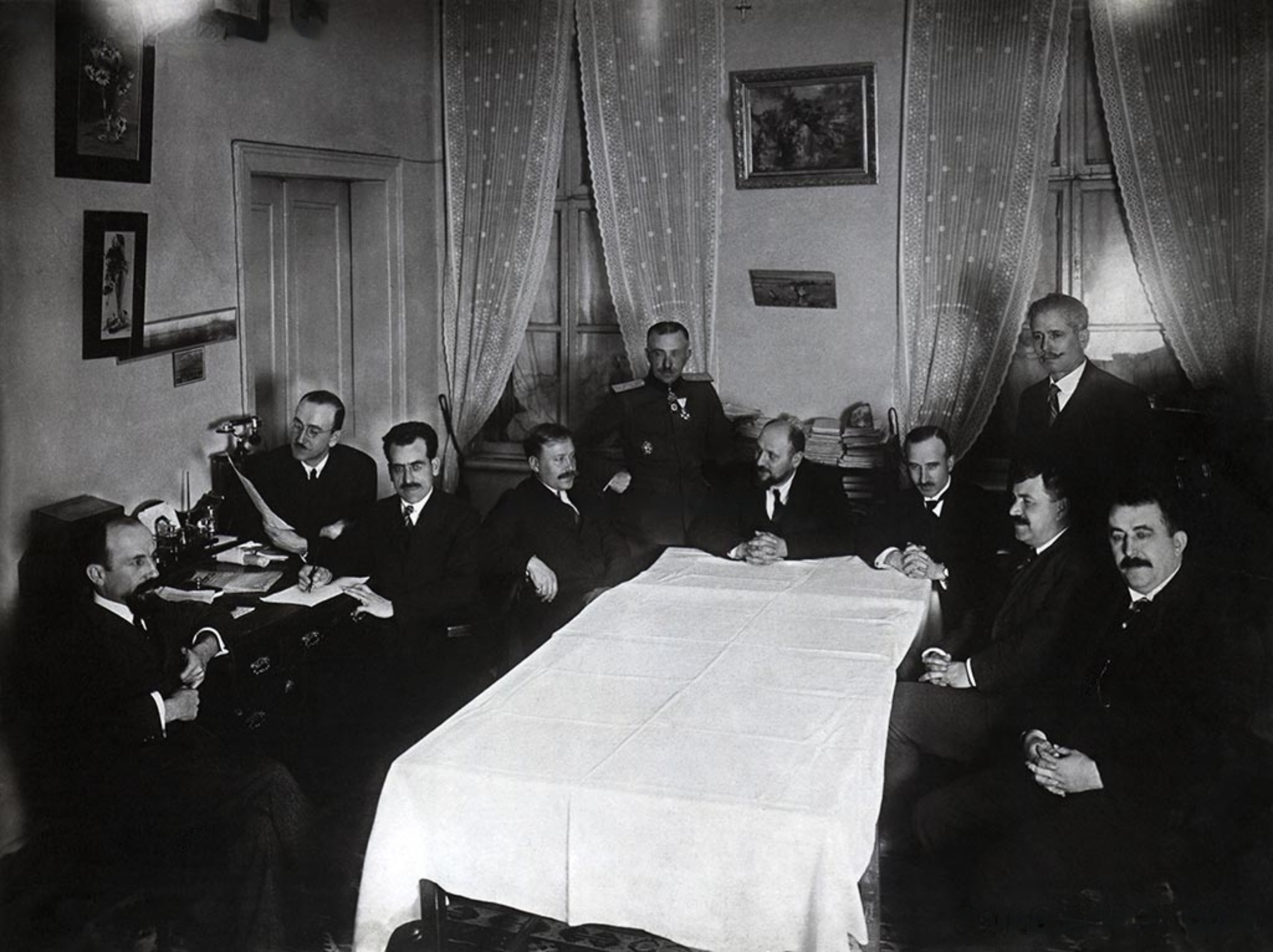
On the eve of the 1923 coup d'état, Kimon Georgiev is second from left.

He was one of the main leaders of the Military Union, which took participation in the 1923 coup d'état. He was also in the home of Ivan Rusev during the night of the coup. He was an active role in the unification of parties to create the Democratic Alliance. In October, he participated in the negotiations for the creation of an electoral coalition with the Bulgarian Workers' Social Democratic Party (broad socialists), and in the elections of 18 November he was elected deputy from the Sofia Rural Collegium.

In April 1925, Georgiev attended the funeral of retired General Konstantin Georgiev, a deputy and chairman of the Sofia organization of the Democratic Union and garrison leader of the Military Union, and was wounded in the St Nedelya Church assault. In an article dedicated to Nikola Rachev, who died in the blast, he called the bombers "freaks" preparing a "death blow" against Bulgaria. Later that year, he was sent to Pirin as a government representative during the Incident at Petrich.

=== Andrey Lyapchev's cabinet ===
At the end of 1925 Kimon Georgiev actively participated in the events that led to the fall of Aleksander Tsankov. He was one of the activists of the People's Congress who at that time advocated changes in the cabinet, and was charged by the leadership of the Democratic Congress to present its decision in this direction to Tsankov. Discussed as a possible interior minister in a new cabinet, on 4 January 1926 he became Minister of Railways, Posts and Telegraphs in Andrey Lyapchev's first cabinet.

After leaving the cabinet, Georgiev was among the members of the internal opposition in the Sgora, grouped around the newspaper "Luch" edited by Petar Todorov, which is why its representatives are often called racists. They advocate stronger state intervention in the economy, limiting partisan appointments in the administration and active action against IMRO. In response, Lyapchev made some concessions, such as the removal of war minister Ivan Valkov. A split occurred within the Radiationist group itself in 1930, when three of its members, including Aleksander Tsankov, were given cabinet seats, and the more extreme opponents, led by Kimon Georgiev, continued to criticize the government. In September, Georgiev himself sharply attacked the war minister in parliament over the Spy Affair. In November, a final rift between the two groups occurred, with the extreme opposition increasingly distancing itself from the Democratic Alliance, consolidating around the Political Circle "Zveno".

=== Zveno ===
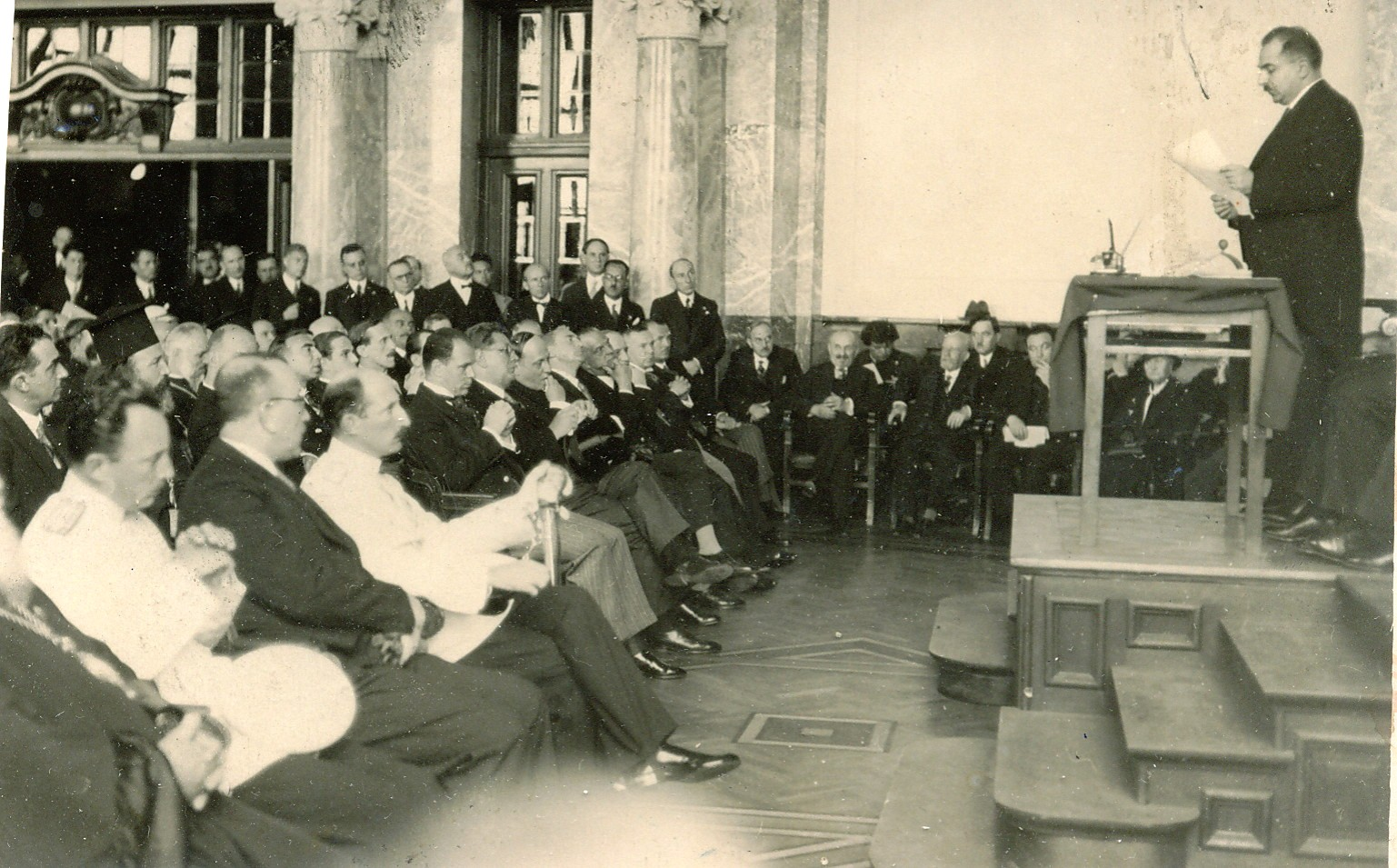
Kimon Georgiev in 1934 during the opening session of the IV International Congress of Byzantine Studies in the Aula of the Sofia University.

Kimon Georgiev established the political circle "Zveno" with Damyan Velchev in 1927, firstly as a non-partisan organization that aims to improve the socio-political climate in the country. It proclaimed its support for authoritarian power, raised above the strictly party interests, with national purpose. The fascists influence on the Zveno is undisputed, but its not characterized as fascist, but a corporate statism in which it mainly drew inspiration from Italian fascism. Georgiev ceased ties with the Democratic Alliance in 1930 and after the 1931 Bulgarian parliamentary election, he was no longer a deputy of his group. He became a leader of the Zveno and in the beginning of 1932, a newspaper Izgrev was published with one of the editors being Georgiev himself. He published articles in which he criticized communism and the Soviet Union, as well as declaring for a strong government "in the name of order and state intervention in economic life." The primary component of Zveno's ideology was anti-communism, which embraced strong "supra-party" authoritarian bourgeois power of the fascist variety while rejecting the bourgeois democratic system of governance. The bulk of Zveno members joined Aleksander Tsankov's Popular Social Movement in January 1934, but a smaller group led by Kimon Georgiev kept the group operating independently. Zveno was a little organization with little social interaction. It made touch with the Military League, which was once more planning a violent change of government.

=== 1934 coup d'état ===
The 1934 coup d'état was executed by the Military Union and the Zveno, who removed Nikola Mushanov from power. It reflected the authoritarian trend in Europe. In this coup, Kimon Georgiev played an important role. At a meeting of the Union's Central Government, held at the house of Kimon Georgiev, it was decided to stage a coup on 19 May. Damyan Velchev and Kimon Georgiev were at the head of the coup.

== Three terms as prime minister ==
=== First Georgiev Cabinet ===
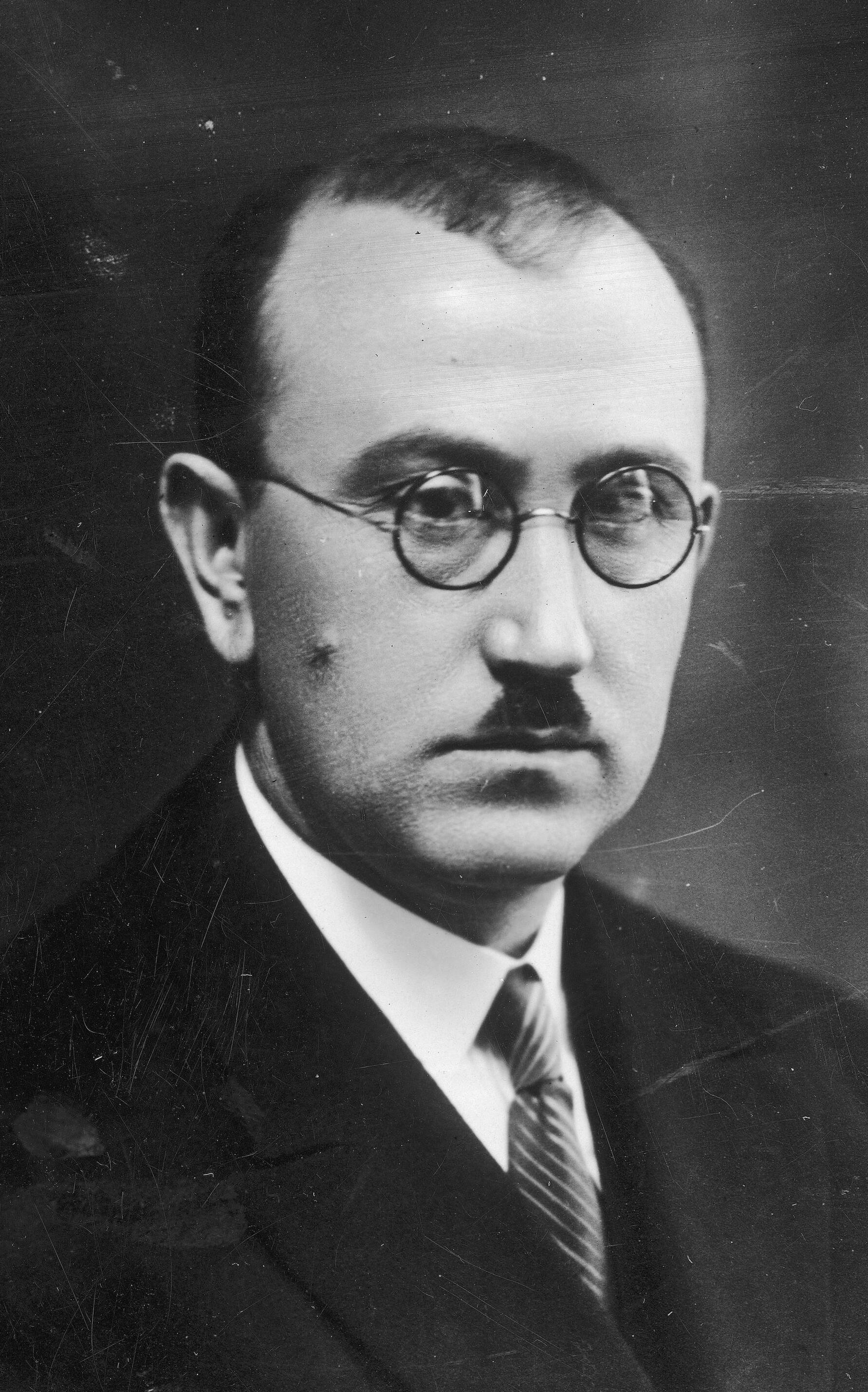
Kimon Georgiev during the 1930s

Kimon Georgiev became prime minister on 19 May 1934, after the coup d'état. He served as Minister of Foreign Affairs and Religious Affairs (19-23 May 1934) and Minister of Justice (23 May 1934 – 22 January 1935) and temporarily served as Minister of War on 19 May 1934. Kimon Georgiev led the new Cabinet, which was primarily made up of Zveno and Military League representatives. Although they denounced the coup, the other bourgeois parties and the non-fascist bourgeois parties accepted it. The BCP called it a fascist coup, but they were unable to put up a united front to fight it due to mistakes in secretarian doctrine. The coup's perpetrators said in their manifesto that a "national supra-party power" would be established. They abolished the Parliament, dissolved the IMRO, and restructured the governmental apparatus on a fascist basis.

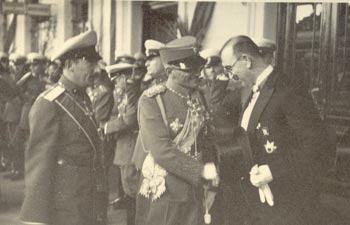
Boris III of Bulgaria, Aleksandar I of Yugoslavia and Kimon Georgiev in 1934

The government dissolved the National Assembly in its first days and the cabinet ruled by ordinance-laws signed by the tsar, invoking Article 47 of the Tarnovo Constitution. On 14 June political parties and trade unions were banned and their property was nationalised. Counties and municipalities were clustered, their self-government abolished and replaced by government-appointed officials. Stricter qualification criteria for teachers were introduced, dozens of schools were closed and over 2,000 teachers were left unemployed. A campaign was organized to replace the traditional names of many villages in the country with Bulgarian ones. Strict censorship was introduced and many printed publications were banned. In order to increase state revenues and subsidize agriculture, the government established state monopolies in the grain, alcohol, and tobacco trades, severely disrupting activity in these sectors. Up to 40% of debts that were difficult to service after the Great Depression were cancelled, the rest were rescheduled, and enforcement measures were limited. Several distressed private banks were consolidated and reactivated with state capital to form the Bulgarian Credit Bank. The two large state-owned banks were also merged into the Bulgarian Agricultural and Cooperative Bank. A Public Assistance Service was established under the Ministry of the Interior, financed by a special tax, and free treatment of the poor in public hospitals was introduced. On 4 September, a Decree-Law on the Safety of the State was issued, practically outlawing the IMRO and assigning the investigation of its activities to the military courts, the police and the army. Mass arrests of IMRO activists and confiscations of weapons and property began. Over the next two years, the Sofia Military Field Court dealt with dozens of cases of murders, kidnappings and racketeering committed by IMRO activists in southwestern Bulgaria. Numerous heavy sentences were handed down, including 21 death sentences against the organization's leader, Ivan Mihailov.

The government made changes in foreign policy, in which it advocated continuity with the previous cabinets, strengthening good relations with neighbouring countries, which had concluded the Balkan Pact at the beginning of the year. The goal of the new government was to completely "renovate" the Bulgarian parliamentary system and change the country's foreign policy. It released the following declaration on foreign policy: "Reestablishment of our relations with Soviet Russia; peace and good relations with all the Great Powers and especially with our neighbors." The government's readiness to disband the Internal Macedonian Revolutionary Organization (IMRO) was demonstrated by its proclamation of the "reéstablishment of the public authority over the entire extent of the territory." In fact, it moved right away to restructure the local administration into seven departments, each headed by a governor with extensive powers. Naturally, the Petrich district—which the Macedonian revolutionaries had previously controlled—was one of them. With Yugoslavia a trade treaty was made and at the end of September, Alexander I made a visit to Sofia in which he was welcomed by thousands of people. Kimon intensified negotiations with the Soviet Union initiated by the previous cabinet and in July 1934, the first diplomatic relations were made between the two countries. In the autumn of 1934, a pro-monarchist wing led by Pencho Zlatev and a pro-republican wing led by Damyan Velchev took shape in the ruling circles of the Zveno and Military Union. Kimon Georgiev began measures to remove Zlatev from his War Office, but its unsuccessful, due to the leadership of the Military Union resisting. Damyan Velchev remained in isolation after the Union's Congress in November with the organization rejecting much of the cabinet's policies. On 22 January 1935, Boris III executed a counter-coup to strength his role in Bulgarian politics, in which Georgiev resigned and Pencho Zlatev took control as a pro-monarchist. Kimon Georgiev was given a chance to be Minister of Justice, but declined.

=== The end of the 30s ===
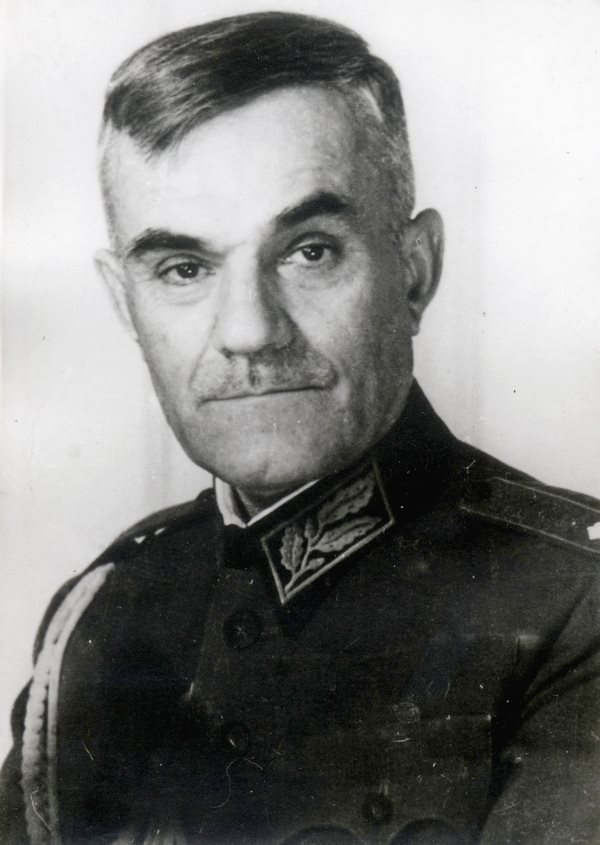
Damyan Velchev, close friend and political ally.

Kimon Georgiev was put under police surveillance after the removal from premiership in which he fell into political isolation. He still maintained active contacts of Damyan Velchev, members of the Zveno and foreign diplomats and journalists, including Soviet ambassador Fyodor Raskolnikov.

He gave an interview to the Yugoslav newspaper Pravda in which he rejected the new government's accusations against him and criticized it. The previous day, Aleksandar Tsankov had given a similar interview. On 18 April 1935, he was interned St. Anastasia Island. Many ministers resigned, in which the Military Union was stripped from leadership and a cabinet headed by Andrey Toshev was formed. The new government began measures to neutralize radical circles within the Military Union, which forced Kimon Georgiev to leave Sofia for Burgas. He was arrested on 2 October in Yambol due to Velchev's coup d'état attempt. On 14 October, he was released but only after 3 days he was briefly arrest, but after no evidence founded of him participating in the plot, he was interned in Burgas. During the trial of Damyan Velchev, he was active in his support and during his time in prison, Georgiev was his legal guardian. Zveno became more closer to the left wing opposition, which is the BZNS and Bulgarian Communist Party. Georgiev was constantly monitored by State Security, however he was not completely isolated from ruling circles and public events.

After the parliament was formed, it had to approve the post-coup ordinance-laws, and during the debates the opposition, and especially Dimitar Gichev, harshly criticized Zveno, the Military Union, and Kimon Georgiev personally for their actions after the coup. He attempted to defend himself with the pamphlet "My Program", which was, however, seized by the authorities and Georgiev was put on trial, but the case was dropped in 1939. Although from 1936 Georgiev and Zveno advocated the restoration of the Tarnovo Constitution, they maintained their foreign policy line. In March 1939, he published the pamphlet A View of Our Foreign Policy Situation (the first book of the Brazdy Library), in which he acknowledged Bulgaria's "indisputable rights", but expressed fears of possible international isolation and advocated the preservation of the Bulgarian-Yugoslav Pact of 1937.

=== World War II ===
Immediately after the start of World War II, Kimon Georgiev sent a letter to Prime Minister Georgi Kyoseivanov, advocating rapprochement with the Soviet Union. During the changes in government in October 1939, Georgiev was received at a two-hour meeting by Tsar Boris III, with whom he discussed the political situation and tried unsuccessfully to secure the release of Damyan Velchev and the other convicted activists of the Military Union. In November 1940, Georgiev supported the Soviet proposal for a mutual aid pact. Apart from the old activists of Zveno, the proposal for the pact is supported only by the Communists, the BZNS-Pladne and some radicals. In January 1941, Kimon Georgiev was among the leaders of almost all the former parties who signed a joint request for an audience with the Tsar, insisting on the preservation of Bulgaria's neutrality. He also expressed this position in a long letter to Prime Minister Bogdan Filov on 11 February, but shortly afterwards the country joined the Tripartite Pact and allowed German troops into Greece.

The anti-fascist Zveno members, especially its prominent representative Kimon Georgiev, were reached out to by the Bulgarian Communist Party, which began collaborating with them to free the nation from the fascist tyranny. With the founding of the Fatherland Front in 1942 at Georgi Dimitrov's instigation, Kimon Georgiev and some of his supporters became members of the National Committee.

The Communists contacted Kimon Georgiev through Racho Angelov, which resulted in the circles around Zveno joining the Fatherland Front. Initially, its activity consisted mainly in maintaining contacts between the activists of the different organizations and issuing common documents, and dozens of committees were established throughout the country. On 10 August 1943, a National Committee of the OF was established, including Kiril Dramaliev, Nikola Petkov, Kimon Georgiev, Grigor Cheshmedzhev and Dimo Kazasov. After the death of Tsar Boris III on 28 August 1943, Kimon Georgiev was among the opposition politicians with whom Prime Minister Bogdan Filov held consultations about the emerging crisis. On 1 September, Georgiev was among the ten opposition figures who signed a joint declaration to implement the Tarnovo Constitution and convene a Grand National Assembly to elect regents. They saw the situation as an opportunity to change the country's foreign policy course, but the government rejected their proposals.

In the autumn of 1943, the Fatherland Front suffered a severe crisis and was on the verge of splitting over the publication of its first official bulletin. Kimon Georgiev, actively supported by Nikola Petkov, drafted an article with the organization's position on the Macedonian question, advocating the creation of a united and independent Macedonian state. The Communists tried not to take a public position on the issue, as the Soviet Union was committed to restoring pre-war borders, and Georgi Dimitrov did not rule out the possibility of a Balkan federation including Bulgaria. Georgiev's main argument to the Communists was that without a clear position on the Macedonian question, Fatherland Front propaganda among the officers would be difficult. Eventually, in December, a compromise text was published avoiding the question of Macedonia's return to Yugoslavia. At the beginning of 1944, Kimon Georgiev and Petko Stainov, a deputy close to Zveno, attempted to coordinate joint actions of the opposition parties, including those outside the Fatherland Front. Georgiev prepared an address to the government and parliament calling for the restoration of neutrality, the return of occupation troops from Yugoslavia and Greece to Bulgaria, and improved relations with the Soviet Union. It is to be discussed and signed by leaders of various opposition groups on 11 January, but heavy bombing the day before prevents the meeting and Kimon Georgiev sends the address on his own behalf.

After the bombing, Kimon Georgiev left with his family for Burgas, where he was placed under house arrest on 12 January. Initially living in his wife's hereditary house, he was then moved under permanent police surveillance to his villa in a vineyard outside the city, where he remained until the end of August. In the spring of 1944, the Fatherland Front leadership considered forming a clandestine government for Bulgaria, and he agreed to head it, preparing to go underground, but the partisans' inability to secure relatively safe territory for the government prevented its establishment. From Burgas, Georgiev maintained active contacts with the capital Sofia, mainly through Hristo Stoykov. In April, he participated in a new appeal by opposition leaders to the regents and the prime minister to dissociate from Germany and change the government, also signed by Nikola Mushanov, Atanas Burov, Krustyo Pastukhov, Dimitar Gichev, Aleksander Girginov, Petko Stainov, Vergil Dimov, Nikola Petkov and Konstantin Muraviev. On 6 August, he participated in a meeting of a wide range of opposition leaders in Sofia - at his insistence, communists also participated - which adopted the so-called Declaration of the 13.

=== 1944 coup d'état ===
At the end of August, the parliament considered various options for forming a new government, including a Fatherland Front cabinet led by Kimon Georgiev. On 27 August he was sent with police guards to the regents in Chamkoria and they tried to persuade him to join a cabinet without the Communists, but Georgiev refused, after which he was released and returned to Sofia. On 30 August, he was among the 14 leaders of the Fatherland Front who issued a Manifesto to the Bulgarian People, the organization's first public document signed by specific individuals.

In the following days, Kimon Georgiev's house became the centre of the coup prepared by the Fatherland Front, visited daily by the leaders of the organisation. Damyan Velchev moved entirely into Georgiev's home. On 6 September, a permanent armed guard of several partisans, headed by Ivan Bonev, was posted there. Following the failure of General Ivan Marinov's attempt to peacefully change the government, a narrowed-down National Committee of the Fatherland Front decided to carry out a military coup at a meeting at the home of Kimon Georgiev on 7 September. At ten o'clock on the same day, a meeting of activists of the Military Union, led by Damyan Velchev, was held to coordinate the actions of the Union to carry out the coup. On the morning of 8 September, representatives of the Fatherland Front - Kimon Georgiev, Nikola Petkov, Dimitar Neykov, Kiril Dramaliev and Dimo Kazasov - met with the Prime Minister, protesting the dispersal of opposition demonstrations in the previous days and demanding that rallies be allowed in the major cities. Kimon Georgiev hosted a meeting of the Fatherland Front's National Committee at 4 p.m. on 8 September. The government's composition was settled upon, and its policy text is approved.

The composition of the future government and the new regents were specified at a meeting between Kimon Georgiev, Dobri Terpeshev, Nikola Petkov and Damyan Velchev at Georgiev's home at 4 pm on 8 September. It was agreed that the cabinet would include four representatives each of the BRP, Zveno and BZNS-Pladne, two of the BRSD and two independents, and that the prime minister would be Kimon Georgiev, a decision agreed with Soviet dictator Joseph Stalin. Georgiev spent the night of the coup with Damyan Velchev, Nikola Petkov, and Traicho Dobroslavsky at the home of Yanko Antonov near the Eagles Bridge - he was a neighbor of Peter Vranchev, in whose apartment the Communist leaders - Dobri Terpeshev, Anton Yugov, Georgi Chankov, Angel Tsanev, and Katya Avramova were at the time.

The coup began at 2 a.m. on 9 September with the seizure of the War Ministry building. War Minister Ivan Marinov sided with the coup and issued the appropriate orders to the First Infantry Division and the School for Reserve Officers. Within 4 hours, the main administrative and communication nodes in the capital were brought under control and the political leaders of the coup moved to the War Ministry. At 6:25 a.m., Kimon Georgiev read a short Proclamation to the Bulgarian people over the radio and announced the composition of the new government, approved a short time later by decree of the regents Prince Kiril and Nikola Mihov.

=== Second Georgiev Cabinet ===
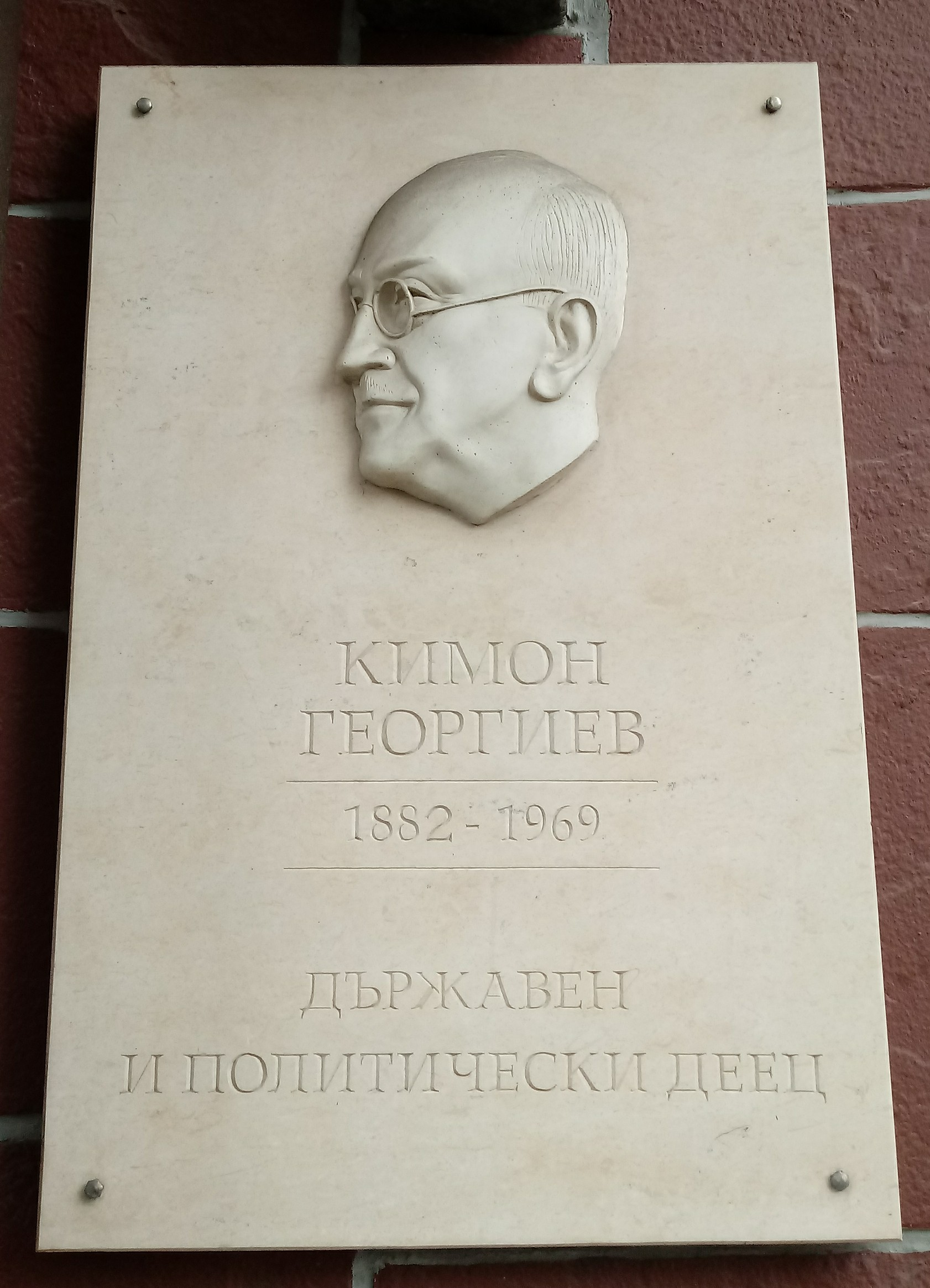
Memorial plaque

The first step of the new government was to settle relations with the Soviet Union. On the evening of 9 September, a delegation including Dimitar Mikhalchev, Kiril Stanchev, Dimitar Ganev and Raicho Slavkov was sent to Marshal Fyodor Tolbukhin, commander of the Third Ukrainian Front, and at 10 p.m. Stalin issued an order to halt Soviet military action against Bulgaria. On 17 September, Kimon Georgiev announced the government's program at a rally in the Palace of Justice.

Zveno officially resumed its activities on 18 September, and on 1 October a national conference was held, at which the organization was transformed into a political party, the People's Union Zveno, and Kimon Georgiev became chairman of its Executive Bureau. Zveno began to establish its own structures throughout the country, expanding its base among the middle class, but at the local level it met with resistance from the communists - people from local organizations were arrested, extorted for money by the militia, not allowed to join the local structures of the Fatherland Front, and declared "fascists."

The first months of the new government were accompanied by terror perpetrated by the communists controlling the interior and justice ministries. According to various estimates, between 2,000 and 30,000 people were killed by the end of November. In mid-November, the Council of Ministers publicly declared against the lynchings, but they were not stopped in practice. At the insistence of the Soviet Union, on 10 October the withdrawal of Bulgarian troops from the parts of Macedonia and Thrace that had been in Greece and Yugoslavia until the war began. On 28 October 1944, a delegation led by Foreign Minister Petko Staynov and including Ministers Nikola Petkov, Dobri Terpeshev and Petko Stoyanov signed an armistice with the Allies. Bulgaria was forced to accept harsh conditions - maintenance of the Soviet troops stationed in the country, placing the government under the control of the Allied Control Commission, and involvement in the hostilities against Germany.

On 3 December, at the suggestion of Damyan Velchev, the Council of Ministers passed a decree enabling the military officers charged under the People's Court Act to go to the front and, if they showed bravery, be discharged. The next day the Communists declared the decree "counter-revolutionary" and organised demonstrations against it, and on 6 December, at the insistence of the head of the Union Control Commission, Sergei Biryuzov, the decree was revoked. In the following days, Communists and Soviet officers headed the General Staff and its Intelligence Department, and held two deputy ministerial posts in the War Ministry.

On 26 January 1945, the Council of Ministers approved the "Ordinance-Law for the Protection of People's Power", which contained 18 articles - 5 of them providing for the death penalty and 4 for life imprisonment. In the following years, it became the basis for the prosecutions of the opposition and the officers during the imposition of the totalitarian regime in the country. Between 23 and 31 January, Kimon Georgiev visited Moscow, where he met Joseph Stalin and Georgi Dimitrov for the first time. The main purpose of the visit was the conclusion, with Soviet mediation, of an alliance treaty between Bulgaria and Yugoslavia. Secret letters to the treaty envisaged the future creation of a federation, without specifying whether on an equal basis between the two countries, which Bulgaria insisted on, or by incorporating Bulgaria into Yugoslavia as a sixth republic, which was the Yugoslav position. The treaty was never concluded because of the opposition of the United Kingdom and the United States, who believed that Bulgaria could not act independently until a peace treaty was concluded.

On 9 February 1945, Kimon Georgiev gave a report on the government's work to the First Congress of the Fatherland Front. Days after the first executions under the decision of the so-called People's Court, he deplored the "cases of self-destruction, arbitrariness and violence" that had been allowed to take place, claimed that they had been curbed quickly, and expressed satisfaction at their being channeled through the People's Court. He states that the constitution and "the rights and liberties of the Bulgarian people" have been restored, although the Council of Ministers rules by ordinance-laws and political organizations outside the Fatherland Front have not been legalized.

In the spring of 1945, tensions between communists and farmers in the Fatherland Front intensified and led to the split of the BZNS. The main part of the organization, headed by Nikola Petkov (BZNS - Nikola Petkov), went into opposition and was replaced in the government by representatives of the pro-communist wing (BZNS (Kazionen). In this environment, in June, Kimon Georgiev and Damyan Velchev met with Traicho Kostov and received assurances about the preservation of the Fatherland Front as a multi-party coalition, as well as for its own positions in the government. As a result, during the 1945 crisis, Zveno remained in the Fatherland Front, with Georgiev remaining fully loyal to the Communists and playing an important role in neutralizing opposition sentiment within Zveno itself. Georgiev's government scheduled elections for 26 August 1945, despite the protests of the opposition, which had no right to exist legally. Bulgaria was under intense pressure from the United States and Britain to postpone the elections to allow them to be held freely, but the Communists firmly refused. Only a day before the date of the elections they were postponed until November on Stalin's personal instructions. In the following weeks the opposition parties were legalised and martial law was lifted. At the elections held on 18 November, which were boycotted by the opposition, Kimon Georgiev was elected as a deputy in Burgas. In December, the United States and Britain made the inclusion of two opposition representatives in the Bulgarian government a condition for its recognition. On Stalin's instructions on 5 January 1946, Kimon Georgiev, Damyan Velchev and Anton Yugov met with opposition leaders Nikola Petkov and Kosta Lulchev, but they flatly refused to enter the government, rejecting the legitimacy of the elections and demanding an end to the Communists' terror. On 7 January Georgiev was summoned to Stalin, who sharply criticised him for his soft attitude towards the opposition. On 10 January, Soviet First Deputy Foreign Minister Andrei Vyshinsky met with Petkov and Lulchev in Sofia, but they did not change their position.

=== Third Georgiev Cabinet ===
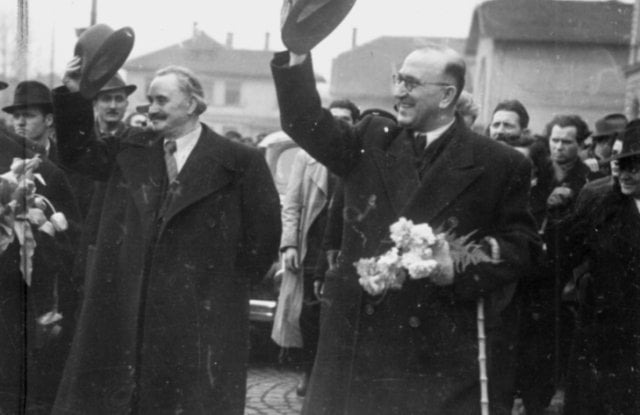
Georgi Dimitrov and Kimon Georgiev in 1946.

In March 1946, the government of Kimon Georgiev was reorganized—two ministries were added, the number of sub-chairmen was reduced, and there were personnel changes and changes in the proportions of the coalition parties. This was on the orders of Joseph Stalin, who criticised the Bulgarian communists for the slow imposition of the totalitarian regime in the country. He demanded the strengthening of the presence of the BPC and BZNS in the cabinet, the removal of the foreign minister Petko Staynov and a purge of the foreign ministry staff, and the replacement of the finance minister Stancho Cholakov. Despite the pressure against Zveno, Georgiev himself retained the confidence of Stalin and Georgi Dimitrov and remained at the head of the cabinet. Apart from being prime minister, he remained a minister without portfolio.

On Joseph Stalin's direct instructions to Georgi Dimitrov, a purge in the army began in the summer of 1946, accompanied by public show trials against alleged officer organizations - "Tsar Krum", "Neutral Officer" and others, as well as opposition leaders such as G. M. Dimitrov and Krustyo Pastukhov. These were coordinated with the parallel mounted trial in Yugoslavia against Draža Mihailović, during which Mihailović's links with Bulgarian public figures such as G. М. Dimitrov, Asen Stamboliyski and the war minister Damyan Velchev. In this setting, Kimon Georgiev publicly spoke out in support of the Military Union and personally of Damyan Velchev, whom he called his "closest and most inseparable personal friend, political associate and comrade in the cabinet". However, Georgiev already has limited influence in the government and pressure against Velchev was increasing. On 2 July the Communists passed for one day a law on control of the army, seizing powers from the war minister at the expense of the Council of Ministers. On 2 August, Kimon Georgiev agreed to the removal of his close associates Kiril Stanchev (arrested and convicted in a show trial) and Damyan Velchev (effectively replaced as minister by Krum Lekarski and interned).

From 11 August to 3 September, Kimon Georgiev was in Paris at the head of a Bulgarian delegation preparing the Paris Peace Treaty. There he met with various politicians, including the foreign ministers of the Soviet Union, Vyacheslav Molotov, and the United States, James Byrnes. Bulgaria unsuccessfully insisted on being recognized as a country that had fought against Germany, but with the support of the Eastern Bloc countries, it managed to significantly reduce the reparations demanded by Greece. Upon his return to Bulgaria, Kimon Georgiev managed to personally solicit protections for Damyan Velchev from Georgi Dimitrov. On 25 September, Georgiev nominally became head of the War Ministry, and Velchev was sent as ambassador to Switzerland, avoiding for the moment a show trial. In September–November 1946, Georgiev was in charge of the War Ministry. During this period, he was promoted to the rank of colonel general.

On 5 October 1946, at a rally in Sofia, Kimon Georgiev opened the Fatherland Front's election campaign for the election of the Sixth Grand National Assembly. The Fatherland Front participated in the elections with a common list and separate ballots for the member parties. While the Communists obtained an absolute majority in the parliament, the People's Union Zveno had an extremely poor result of about 70,000 votes, and its leaders, including Georgiev himself, became deputies only thanks to the common list of the Fatherland Front.

== Ministries held ==
After the elections to the Grand National Assembly and the declaration of Bulgaria as a republic, Georgiev stepped down from the premiership at the request of Communist Party leader Georgi Dimitrov. Dimitrov had effectively been leading the country since the monarchy was abolished in September.

In the second government of Georgi Dimitrov of 12 December 1947 he was removed from the Foreign Ministry and became Minister of Electrification and Land Reclamation, remaining in this post until 1959, after which he briefly served as Chairman of the Committee on Construction and Architecture. He was Deputy Prime Minister until 1950 and again in 1959–1962. Kimon Georgiev was expelled from the country's political leadership, which was placed under the full control of the Bulgarian Communist Party. At the same time, as Minister of Electrification, he played an important role, as the construction of the power industry was key to the Communists' policy of massive industrialization. Between 1947 and 1959, electricity production increased more than sixfold, and numerous power plants, dams and transmission facilities were built.

In 1948, after the revocation of Damyan Velchev's Bulgarian citizenship, the State Security started a secret investigation against Georgiev. This took place in the context of growing tensions between Yugoslavia and the Soviet bloc, and Georgiev was known for his long-standing position in favour of friendly relations between Yugoslavia and Bulgaria. The investigation did not lead to public accusations, and Georgiev himself learned about it years later. In September 1949, Stalin put an end to so-called "people's democracy" in Eastern Europe, beginning the final formation of totalitarian regimes in the region. Those closest to the communists, the Zveno activists, such as Traicho Dobroslavsky, Trifon Trifonov, and Kiril Shterev, demanded a public stand against the disgraced Damyan Velchev, Vasil Yurukov, and Petko Stainov. In a conference held on February 19, 1949, the People's Union Zveno accepted that it had fulfilled its role and decided to dissolve itself and join the Fatherland Front in full. With this act, Zveno ceased to exist as an independent political organization. Georgiev left politics in 1952 and led a reclusive life until his death.

== Personal life ==
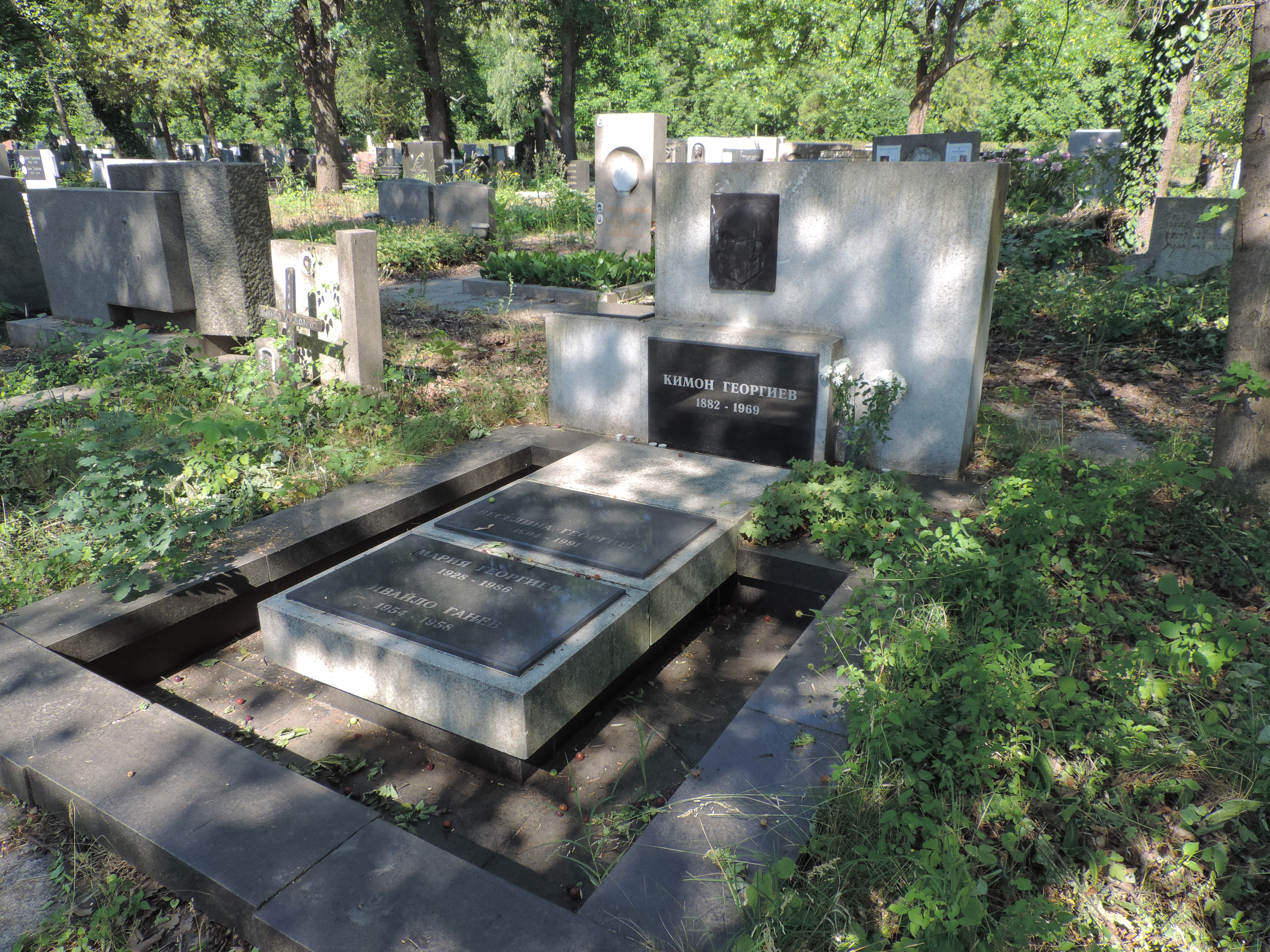
Grave of Kimon Georgiev

Kimon Georgiev married Veselina Rodeva from the prominent Rodeva family of Burgas, they had two daughters - Maria (1928–1986) and Kornelia (b. 1931). Maria became an agronomist and university lecturer and was married to the Fatherland Front functionary Ginyo Ganev.

Kimon Georgiev during his non-political time, he would engage in public work, in which he supported himself from his wife's large vineyards. This brought him a considerable income, in which he earned about 4-5 million leva from the production of wine and grapes in the 1940s.

== Death ==
Kimon Georgiev died suddenly of a stroke at around 1 pm on 28 September 1969 at the rest station of the Council of Ministers in Varna, shortly after visiting the Varna Thermal Power Plant, which had opened a month earlier. He was buried on 30 September in the Central Sofia Cemetery with state honours, with Prime Minister Todor Zhivkov attending the ceremony.

== Awards ==
From 1962 until his death in 1969 Kimon Georgiev was a member of the Presidium of the National Assembly. Twice, in 1962 and 1967, he received the title "Hero of Socialist Labour".

== Footnotes ==
Political offices
Preceded by Nikola Mushanov	Prime Minister of Bulgaria; 1934–1935	Succeeded by Pencho Zlatev
Preceded by Konstantin Muraviev	Prime Minister of Bulgaria; 1944–1946	Succeeded by Georgi Dimitrov
Preceded by Nikola Mushanov	Minister of Foreign Affairs of Bulgaria; 1934	Succeeded by Konstantin Batolov
Preceded by Georgi Kulishev	Minister of Foreign Affairs of Bulgaria; 1946–1947	Succeeded by Vasil Kolarov
Preceded by Damyan Velchev	Minister of War of Bulgaria; 1946	Succeeded by Georgi Damyanov
