= Dimo Kazasov =

Bulgarian politician and journalist

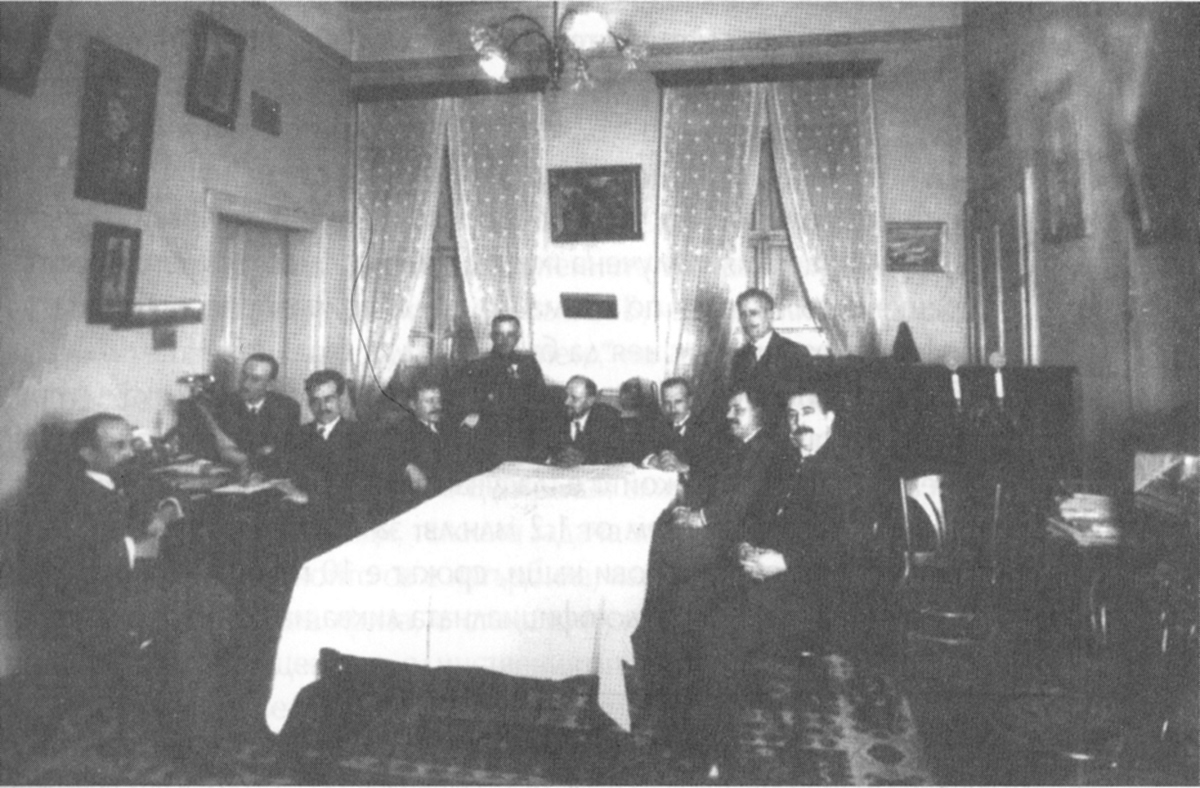
The leaders of the 1923 coup in the house of General Ivan Rusev (the image has been restored). From left to right: Dimo Kazasov, Kimon Georgiev, Nikola Rachev, Yanaki Mollov, Ivan Valkov, Aleksandar Tsankov, Khristo Kalfov, Ivan Rusev, Petar Todorov, Tsvetko Boboshevski.

Dimitar (Dimo) Totev Kazasov (Bulgarian: Димо Тотев Казасов) (17 September 1886 – 28 July 1980) was a Bulgarian politician and journalist, initially from the Bulgarian Workers' Social Democratic Party (BRSDP), and later from several other organizations. He joined the governments formed after the 1923 and 1944 coups. He was MP in the XVIII (1919–1920), XXI (1923–1927), XXVI (1945–1946) National Assembly and in the VI Grand National Assembly (1946–1949).

== Early life ==
Dimo Kazasov was born in 1886 in Tryavna. He went to highscool in Ruse and graduated in 1904. Between 1906 and 1910 he was a teacher in Tutrakan, Ruse, Burgas, Kula and Voneshta voda. He graduated in law from Sofia University in 1918. He was secretary of the Union of Bulgarian Teachers from 1910 to 1917. Early on he also appeared as a journalist. From 1924 to 1927 he was chairman of the Union of Bulgarian Journalists.

== Political activity ==
Kazasov was a member of BRSDP from 1902 and from 1919 to 1926 he was a member of its central committee. Between 1920 and 1923 he was chief editor of its Narod (People) newspaper. In 1919–1920, he was an MP in the XVIII National Assembly. He was chairman of the Strike Committee during the big Transport Strike of 1919–1920 (in Bulgarian).

Kazasov took active part in the 1923 coup d'état and from 1923 to 1924 he was minister of the railways, post offices and telegraphs. In 1926, he was expelled from BRSDP and created his own party – the Social Democratic Federation which he left in 1927. In the same year Kazasov and a group of intellectuals created the Zveno Political Organisation. He published Zveno's Zveno magazine and Izgrev (Sunrise) newspaper. In early 1934 he separated from Kimon Georgiev and his group left Zveno and joined Aleksandar Tsankov's National Social Movement.

Kazasov took part in the 19 May coup d'état in the same year, although he publicly stated that had nothing to do with it. Following the coup he was appointed ambassador in Belgrade and remained in office until 1936. From 1936 to 1944 he was chairman of the Committee for Protection and Amnesty of Political Fighters.

At the beginning of World War II, he took active part in protection of Bulgarian Jews from deportation. Kazasov became a member of the National Committee of the Fatherland Front. Kazasov took part in the 9 September coup d'état and was minister of propaganda in the second government of Kimon Georgiev (1944–1946). After that he was minister of arts and information in the first government of Georgi Dimitrov (1946–1947). After three-year absence from the political scene, in 1950 Kazasov was appointed chief director of the publishing houses, polygraphy and the trade with printed works. This was a key office, formed during Valko Chervenkov's rule, whose purpose was to censor the press and book publishing in communist Bulgaria during the Stalinist period. In 1953 Kazasov withdrew from political life and published his memoirs. Kazasov died on 28 July 1980 in Sofia.
