= Pencho Zlatev =

Bulgarian general and politician

- Пенчо Златев
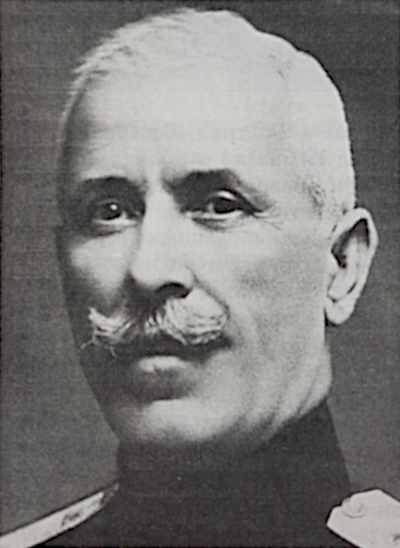
- Zlatev in 1934

25th Prime Minister of Bulgaria
- In office 22 January 1935 – 21 April 1935
- Monarch: Boris III
- Preceded by: Kimon Georgiev
- Succeeded by: Andrey Toshev

Personal details
- Born: 2 November 1881 Elena, Bulgaria
- Died: 24 July 1948 (aged 66) Sofia, Bulgaria

Military service
- Branch/service: Bulgarian Land Forces
- Rank: Lieutenant-General
- Battles/wars: Balkan Wars; World War I

Pencho Ivanov Zlatev (Bulgarian: Пенчо Иванов Златев, 2 November 1881 – 24 July 1948), also known as Petko Ivanov Zlatev (Bulgarian: Петко Иванов Златев), was a Bulgarian general and politician in the years before the Second World War.

== Biography ==
Zlatev was born in Elena, Bulgaria. He became the Inspector-General of the Cavalry. Zlatev was also a member of the Military League, a right-wing group that had close links to Zveno. Following the 1934 coup by this movement, Zlatev became Minister of Defence, although as a staunch monarchist he became wary of the growing republican sentiments expressed by some members of the new regime. As a result, Tsar Boris III orchestrated a counter-coup against the new regime and placed Zlatev as Prime Minister on 22 January 1935. Zlatev, who was only intended as a strong military presence in the immediate aftermath of the coup, was quickly replaced once Boris' control was assured, whilst the decision to imprison Kimon Georgiev and Aleksandar Tsankov also weakened Zlatev's position.

== See also ==
- List of Bulgarian generals in the Kingdom of Bulgaria

Political offices
Preceded by Kimon Georgiev	Prime Minister of Bulgaria; 1935	Succeeded by Andrey Toshev
Political offices
Preceded by Anastas Vatev	Minister of War of Bulgaria; 1934–1935	Succeeded by Stefan Tsanev
