= Nikola Mushanov =

Bulgarian politician

- Никола Мушанов
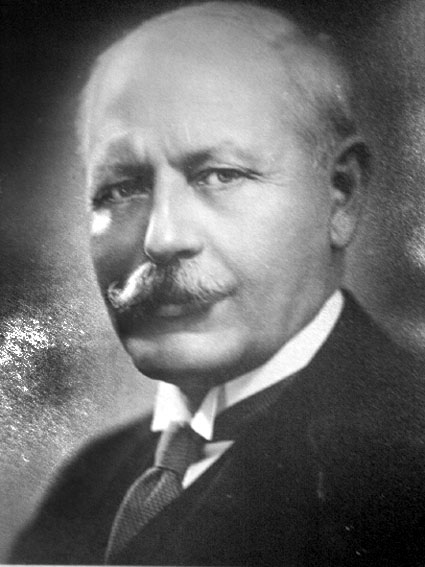

23rd Prime Minister of Bulgaria
- In office 12 October 1931 – 19 May 1934
- Monarch: Boris III
- Preceded by: Aleksandar Malinov
- Succeeded by: Kimon Georgiev

Personal details
- Born: 12 April 1872 Dryanovo, Ottoman Empire
- Died: 10 May 1951 (aged 79) Sofia, Bulgaria

Nikola Stoykov Mushanov (Bulgarian: Никола Стойков Мушанов; 12 April 1872 – 10 May 1951) was a Bulgarian liberal politician who served as prime minister and leader of the Democratic Party. He later became noted for vigorous opposition to the growth of antisemitism in the country during the Second World War.

== Prime minister ==
Mushanov studied and worked in law before embarking on a career in politics. He was first elected to the Sabranie in 1902.

After a career as a minister in a number of governments, Mushanov came to power on 12 October 1931 following the decision of Aleksandar Malinov to step down due to ill health. His greatest policy success came in 1932 when he managed to bring an end to the war reparations that Bulgaria had been forced to pay. Despite this, the economy remained in a poor state, whilst his policy aims of working with Kemal Atatürk towards reconciliation with Turkey also upset the right. Like most of his contemporaries Mushanov also faced the problem of dealing with the Internal Macedonian Revolutionary Organization and followed the practice of his predecessors of opposing the group's activity, despite personally having some sympathy with their aims. Alongside this, the government was marked by internal political difficulties, notably with the governing Democratic Union splitting during his premiership and the government having to be reformed on different lines. As a result, he was overthrown in a military coup on 19 May 1934 by the militaristic Zveno movement.

== During the war ==
During the Second World War Mushanov became known as a supporter of the Jews against the Holocaust. Mushanov however rejected the chance to join the resistance as he felt it was dominated by communists and instead chose to remain within the Sobranie as one of the few members of the official opposition. Nonetheless, despite his distaste for domestic communists, Mushanov maintained regular contact with diplomats from the Soviet Union throughout the war.

Retaining his parliamentary seat, Mushanov was active in speaking out against the promulgation of antisemitic laws in Bulgaria. As a consequence Mushanov enjoyed a strong reputation with the Allies and during negotiations between Bulgaria and the Western powers in 1944 one of their conditions for accepting Bulgarian surrender was that Mushanov should take a leading role in the cabinet. He was a Minister Without Portfolio in Konstantin Muraviev's short-lived government of September 1944 although he left office following the Fatherland Front coup. Infrequent contact between Mushanov and leaders of the Front had existed between 1942 and 1943 although the negotiations had come to nothing, with Mushanov retaining a personal loyalty to the Tsar, and by this point there was no relationship.

== Later years ==
In the reprisals that followed the establishment of communism in Bulgaria, Mushanov was, along with the rest of the Muraviev cabinet, spared death but imprisoned. Mushanov attempted to convince the new Bulgarian Communist Party government to re-establish democracy in the country, although his efforts proved in vain.

Political offices
Preceded by Aleksandar Malinov	Prime Minister of Bulgaria; 1931–1934	Succeeded by Kimon Georgiev
Preceded by Aleksandar Malinov	Minister of Foreign Affairs of Bulgaria; 1931–1934	Succeeded by Kimon Georgiev
