= Damyan Velchev =

Bulgarian politician and general

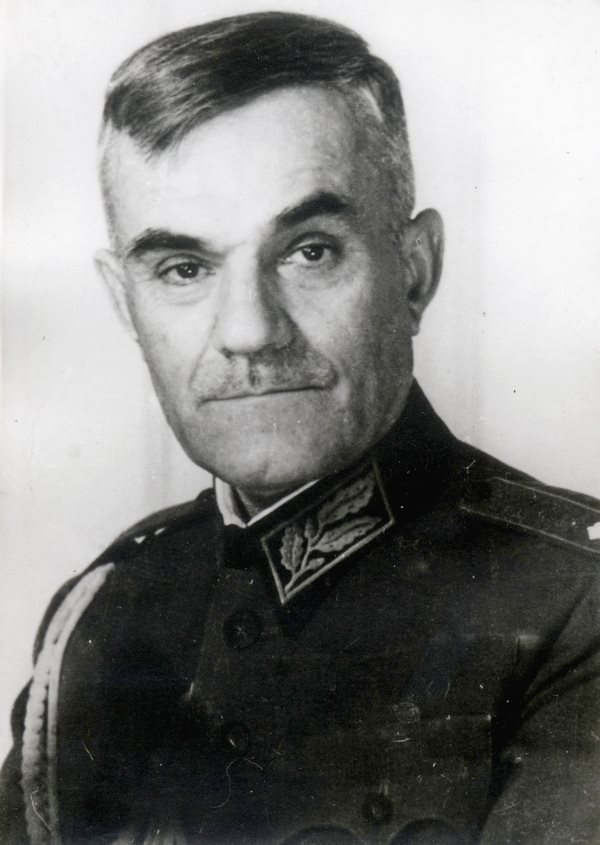
Damyan Velchev

Damyan Velchev or Velcev (Bulgarian: Дамян Велчев) (4 March 1883, Gabrovo – 25 January 1954, Paris) was a Bulgarian politician and general.

From 1925 to 1935 he was the leader of the Military League (Bulgaria) (1919–1947), an organization of Bulgarian officers which carried the 1923, 1934 and 1944 coup d'etats. In 1930 he became a member of the Zveno group. In 1934 he led the pro-Zveno coup, but did not become a minister and stayed in the background. After King Boris III's counter-coup of 1935 Velchev fled abroad, but later slipped back into the country wanting to make another coup d'état and was arrested. He was sentenced to death in 1936, but Boris spared his life.

In 1943 he joined the Fatherland Front, an anti-Axis resistance movement. In 1944 the Fatherland Front seized power and Velchev became Minister of Defence with the rank of colonel general. He resigned in 1946 because of communist purges within the army. Later he became ambassador to Switzerland as an act by the communists to keep him away from Bulgarian matters, but in 1947 he resigned and asked for political asylum. He remained in Switzerland until his death in France in 1954.

Political offices
Preceded by Ivan Marinov	Minister of War of Bulgaria; 9 September 1944 – 25 September 1946	Succeeded by Kimon Georgiev
