= Zveno =

1927–1949 Bulgarian nationalist military and political organisation

Political Circle "Zveno" Политически кръг "Звено"
- Leaders: Kimon Georgiev; Damyan Velchev; Dimo Kazasov
- Founded: 1930; 96 years ago
- Dissolved: 1949; 77 years ago
- Preceded by: Military Union
- Succeeded by: People's Union "Zveno"
- Headquarters: Sofia, Bulgaria
- Youth wing: Youth Union "Zveno"
- Publications: Zveno, Izgrev, Brazda
- Ideology: Technocratic oligarchy Anti-parliamentarism; Authoritarian conservatism Corporate statism Yugoslav irredentism
- Political alliance: Fatherland Front (from 1943)

Zveno (Bulgarian: Звено, lit. 'link'), Politicheski krag "Zveno", officially Political Circle "Zveno" was a Bulgarian political organization that was founded in 1930 by Bulgarian politicians, intellectuals and Bulgarian Army officers and was associated with a newspaper with the same name.

As a palingenetic nationalist movement, Zveno advocated for the rationalization of Bulgaria's economic and political institutions under a dictatorship that would be independent of both the Soviet Union and the Axis powers. It strongly opposed the Bulgarian party system, which it saw as dysfunctional, and the terror of the Internal Macedonian Revolutionary Organization (IMRO), the liberation movement of the Bulgarian Macedonians. Zveno was also closely linked to the so-called Military League, the organisation behind a coup in 1923 that was responsible for killing Prime Minister Aleksandar Stamboliyski.

In 1934, officers supporting Zveno like Colonel Damyan Velchev and Colonel Kimon Georgiev seized power. Georgiev became prime minister. They dissolved all parties, political organizations and trade unions and openly attacked the IMRO. As a political organization itself, Zveno dissolved itself. The new government introduced a corporatist economy similar to that of Benito Mussolini's Italy. As a nationalist organization, Zveno changed many of the Ottoman-era Turkish place names of villages and towns in Bulgaria to Bulgarian ones. Tsar Boris III, an opponent of Zveno, orchestrated a coup through a monarchist Zveno member, General Pencho Zlatev, who became Prime Minister (January 1935). In April 1935, he was replaced by a civilian, Andrey Toshev, also a monarchist. After participating in the Bulgarian coup d'état of 1934, Zveno supporters declared their intention to immediately form an alliance with France.

In 1943, Zveno joined the anti-Axis resistance movement, the Fatherland Front. In September 1944, the Fatherland Front engineered a coup d'état. Georgiev became prime minister and Velchev defence minister, and they managed to sign a ceasefire agreement with the Soviet Union.

In 1946, Velchev resigned in protest against communist actions, while Georgiev was succeeded by the communist leader, Georgi Dimitrov, and Bulgaria became a People's Republic. Georgiev remained in government until 1962, but Zveno was disbanded as an autonomous organization in 1949. Zveno continued to exist within the Fatherland Front but by then was only a puppet organization.
