= Georgi Kyoseivanov =

Prime Minister of Bulgaria from 1935 to 1940

- Георги Кьосеиванов
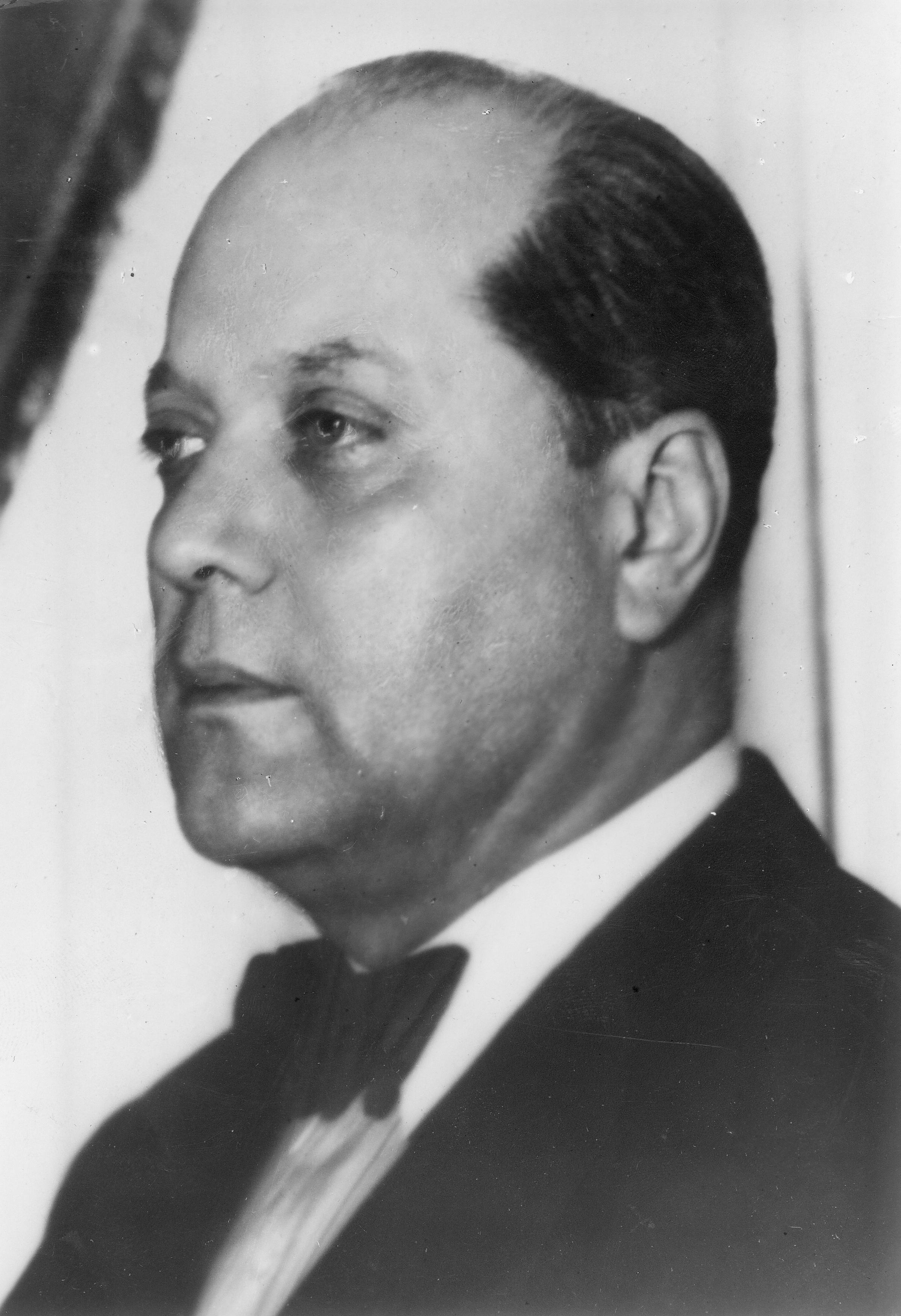
- Kyoseivanov in 1939

27th Prime Minister of Bulgaria
- In office 23 November 1935 – 16 February 1940
- Monarch: Boris III
- Preceded by: Andrey Toshev
- Succeeded by: Bogdan Filov

Personal details
- Born: 19 January 1884 Peshtera, Eastern Rumelia
- Died: 27 July 1960 (aged 76) Switzerland
- Party: Non-Party

Georgi Ivanov Kyoseivanov (Bulgarian: Георги Иванов Кьосеиванов; 19 January 1884 – 27 July 1960) was a Bulgarian politician who was Prime Minister from 1935 until 1940.

Kyoseivanov came to power on 23 November 1935 after a period in which the country had had three Prime Ministers in quick succession. He went on to become the longest-serving PM since Andrey Lyapchev and throughout the period of his administration he also held the post of Foreign Minister. The government oversaw the trials of the instigators of the 1934 Bulgarian coup d'état and also concluded pacts with Yugoslavia and Greece as Nazi Germany undertook a policy of economic isolation of the Balkans. His government also oversaw a policy of rearmament after a treaty concluded with Ioannis Metaxas overturned the military clauses of the Treaty of Neuilly-sur-Seine and the Treaty of Lausanne. Despite this Kyoseivanov's government was seen as little more than a puppet of Tsar Boris and, although it lasted until 1940, achieved little other than allowing the Tsar to effectively govern as an absolute monarch.

In 1940 he became ambassador to Switzerland where he remained after the 1944 coup in Bulgaria.

Political offices
Preceded by Andrey Toshev	Prime Minister of Bulgaria; 1935–1940	Succeeded by Bogdan Filov
Preceded by Konstantin Batolov	Minister of Foreign Affairs of Bulgaria; 1935–1940	Succeeded by Ivan Popov
