= 1923 Bulgarian coup d'état =

Military coup that overthrew the Agrarian National Union government

9 June coup d'état
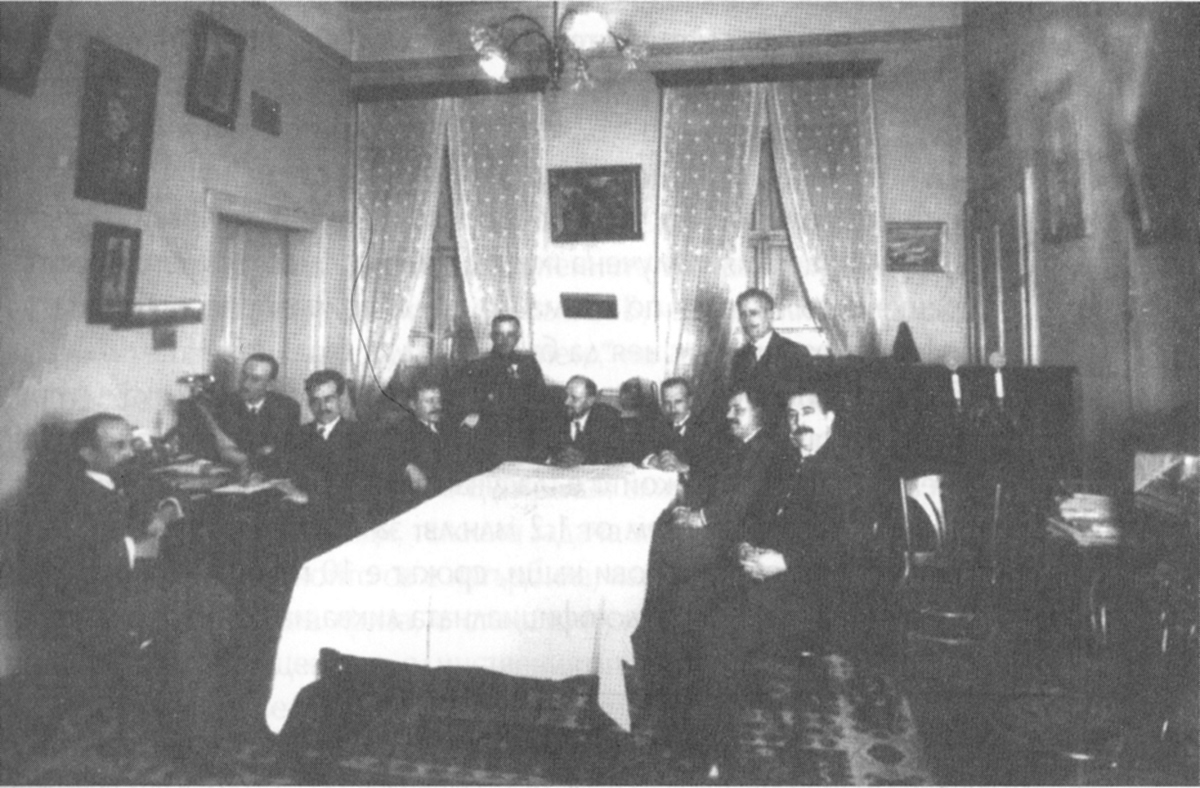
- The leaders of the coup in the house of General Ivan Rusev (the image has been restored). From left to right: Dimo Kazasov, Kimon Georgiev, Nikola Rachev, Yanaki Mollov, Ivan Valkov, Aleksandar Tsankov, Khristo Kalfov, Ivan Rusev, Petar Todorov, Tsvetko Boboshevski.
Date	9 June 1923
Location	Sofia, Bulgaria
Result	Coup successful: Government of Aleksandar Stamboliyski deposed and replaced by one under Aleksandar Tsankov.: June Uprising; September Uprising

Belligerents
Bulgarian Land Forces; Military League; People's Alliance; Internal Macedonian Revolutionary Organization (IMRO)	Government of Bulgaria (Bulgarian Agrarian National Union) Orange Guard

Commanders and leaders
Ivan Valkov (Army); Damyan Velchev (Military Union); Aleksandar Tsankov (Democratic Alliance); Todor Aleksandrov (IMRO)	Aleksandar Stamboliyski † Rayko Daskalov (Orange Guard)

The 1923 Bulgarian coup d'état, also known as the 9 June coup d'état (Bulgarian: Деветоюнски преврат, Devetoyunski prevrat), was a coup d'état in Bulgaria implemented by armed forces under General Ivan Valkov's Military League on the evening of 9 June 1923. Hestitantly legitimized by a decree of Tsar Boris III of Bulgaria, the coup overthrew the elected government headed by Aleksandar Stamboliyski of the Bulgarian Agrarian National Union (BANU), and replaced it with one under Aleksandar Tsankov.

== Background ==
The Bulgarian army, defeated in World War I, was limited in size to 20,000 men by the Treaty of Neuilly-sur-Seine. A shadow of its former glory, the army retained weapons hidden away for better times. In 1919 a group of officers led by Generals Ivan Valkov and Velizar Lazarov – and joined by Kimon Georgiev and Damyan Velchev – formed the Military League. This organization grew over the next couple of years to effectively command the army.

After the war Aleksandar Stamboliyski was released from prison in an effort to quell the civil unrest against the wartime government and Tsar Ferdinand. The result had mixed success: Ferdinand abdicated in favor of his son, Boris III, and Stamboliyski became Prime Minister in 1919. His new agrarian government brought about reforms which, although popular with the farmers who comprised over 80% of the population of Bulgaria (in 1920), were unpopular amongst the upper-middle class parties. Even more dangerous for Stamboliyski's government was that the armed forces were not allowed to nominate the Minister of Defence and had no representation in cabinet since the end of the war. This meant that Stamboliyski's government had no support from the army. As the power of the Military League grew, the civilian government was in danger of being overthrown by the mostly disloyal army.

To the dismay of opposition parties and Tsar Boris III, the BANU and Communist Party polled a combined total of 59% of the votes in the 1920 elections. The middle-class, businessmen and aristocrats worried that their interests would be, for the first time, seriously challenged by the communists. As the agrarian government grew more and more autocratic, a group of political parties (the United People's Progressive Party, the Democratic Party, the Radical Democratic Party, and People's Alliance) ran together in the April 1923 parliamentary election as the Constitutional Bloc, but only won 17 seats. Fraud and the new voting system were the culprits, although the BANU was still relatively popular amongst the countrymen. In 1922, after gaining approval by a plebiscite, the government began trying and imprisoning leaders of opposition parties for their roles in previous wars. In the face of repression, several parties decided that the overthrow of the government was a necessity to their survival. Based in the Macedonian region of Bulgaria, the nationalist and revolutionary Internal Macedonian Revolutionary Organization carried out attacks against Greece and the Kingdom of Yugoslavia in attempt to free the Bulgarian lands under Greek and Yugoslav rule. On March 23, 1923, Stamboliyski signed the Treaty of Niš pledging to suppress their activities. The organization, until then at peace with the government, began plotting against it.

== Preparations ==
Opposition parties met with leaders of the Military League to prepare for the coup. The Military League, wanting to give an appearance of legality to the ouster of Stamboliyski, needed a civilian government to hand over power to.

== Coup ==
On the morning of 9 June, 1923, before dawn, the order was given for the garrisons in Sofia to block roads, cut telephone lines, and take control of key objectives such as police stations, post offices and train stations. After three hours, the coup was successful. By 5 a.m. a new government led by Aleksandar Tsankov had been installed in Sofia. The next morning, the leaders of the coup met with Tsar Boris at his palace in Vrana. After a six-hour meeting they convinced him to sign a decree legitimizing the new cabinet, which he did on condition that the new government include agrarians and avoid repression. Both of these conditions were ignored.

Aleksandar Stamboliyski was away from the capital on the day of the coup. He was arrested five days later and handed over to Internal Macedonian Revolutionary Organization (IMRO) fighters in his home town of Slavovitsa who brutally tortured him for hours, and cut off his hand, before finally murdering him. Besides Stamboliyski, other notable BANU representatives were killed immediately after the coup as well, such as the mayor of Sofia Krum Popov.

== Aftermath ==
Despite the initial success, the new government was still in danger. In several places, the coup met with the armed opposition of agrarians and peasants, an event known in Bulgarian historiography as the June Uprising. The uprising was largely unorganized in its essence, lacking a common leadership – after the death of Stamboliyski – and a nationwide radius of action. Despite large-scale activity by the rebels around Pleven (which they managed to capture), Pazardzhik and Shumen, it was quickly crushed by the new government. Crucial was the inactivity of the Bulgarian Communist Party which viewed the events as "a clash between the urban and peasant bourgeoisie" and greeted the fall of BANU, for the Union had viewed the Communists as its enemies during its rule.

Unlike the agrarians, the Communists Party of Bulgaria (BCP, member of Comintern) had a strong military organization. It was well supplied with arms by BCP followers within the barracks and, unlike the party of the agrarians, was already in the grip of the notorious communist iron discipline. Its position could allegedly have decided between the success or failure of the coup. In a move that would prove fatal to both the agrarians and later themselves, the communists did not take part in the June Uprising. Its leadership regarded both the uprising and the coup as "struggle for power between the urban and rural bourgeoisie" and as a replacement of one military dictatorship – that of the "rural bourgeoisie" and their 'posse comitatus', with another – that of the urban upper middle class. The party's stance of neutrality allowed the new government to crush the rebels and consolidate its power.

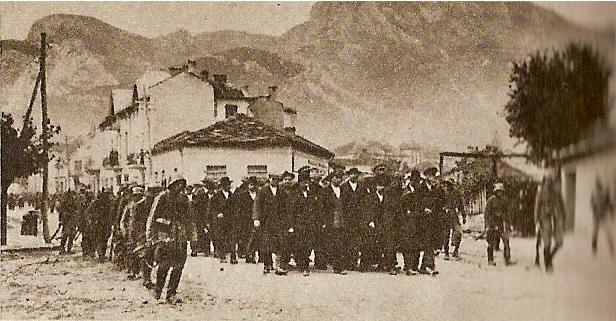
Arrested rebels in Vratsa

Under pressure from the Comintern, who condemned their inactivity, the Communist Party made preparations in August for an uprising the following month. This short time frame did not allow for nationwide organization. Furthermore, the new government was made aware of the impending rebellion and subjected the communists to mass arrests. This crippling pre-emptive blow crippled the rebels and who finalized plans for an uprising on the eve of September 23. The insurrection was put down by the army. Thousands of rebels were killed without charge or trial.

This marked the debut of Aleksandar Tsankov's reign of "white terror", prompting the future bombing of the St Nedelya Church, prompting, in turn, martial law and an intensification of the terror.

== See also ==
- Bulgarian coup d'état of 1934
- Bulgarian coup d'état of 1944
