= 1934 Bulgarian coup d'état =

Military coup by Zveno that overthrew the Popular Bloc coalition

19 May coup d'état
Location	Sofia, Bulgaria
Result	Coup successful

Belligerents
Bulgarian Land Forces; Military League; Zveno	Government of Bulgaria

Commanders and leaders
Kimon Georgiev	Nikola Mushanov

The Bulgarian coup d'état of 1934, also known as the 19 May coup d'état (Bulgarian: Деветнадесетомайски преврат, Devetnadesetomayski prevrat), was a coup d'état in the Kingdom of Bulgaria carried out by the Zveno military organization and the Military Union with the aid of the Bulgarian Army. It overthrew the government of the wide People's Bloc coalition and replaced it with one under Kimon Georgiev.

== History ==
The Popular Bloc, which had held power since 1931, consisted of the Democratic Party, Bulgarian Agrarian National Union (BANU) "Vrabcha 1", the National Liberal Party and the Radical Democratic Party. Although it did not abolish the restrictive laws introduced by the former government of the Democratic Accord and it did not change the way the police functioned, it was met with hostility from right-wing forces such as the Military Union (led by Damyan Velchev), Zveno and Aleksandar Tsankov's National Social Movement, of which the most active were the Zveno activists.

After a Military Union congress in November 1933, direct preparations for the coup began, with the plotters attempting to win the support of BANU "Vrabcha 1", BANU "Aleksandar Stamboliyski" and even the Democratic Party, but in vain. Taking advantage of the discord in the Popular Bloc in the spring of 1934, the Zveno activists carried out the coup on the eve of 19 May, ahead of Aleksandar Tsankov's supporters, who had planned a coup for 20 May. The coup installed a government under Kimon Georgiev which, besides Zveno members, also included right-wing agrarians and National Social Movement members, while the most important ministry positions were held by the Military Union.

== Actions ==
The coup was not well received by the other political parties, but they were unable to oppose it effectively. The new government abolished the Tarnovo Constitution, dissolved the National Assembly and banned all political parties and organizations, revolutionary organizations and trade unions. All their property got confiscated and severe sentences were provided for attempting to renew a party in any form or to establish a new party. A new governmental system was introduced wherein the central authority would appoint mayors and would establish state trade unions. Additionally, measures were adopted to deal with the workers' and socialist movement in the country. A state monopoly was introduced, which affected the interests of the big companies. A Public Renewal Directory (Дирекция на обществената обнова, Direktsiya na obshtestvenata obnova) was created, a special state organisation that promoted and propagandised the policy of the government. As a nationalist organization, Zveno changed many of the Ottoman-era Turkish place names of villages and towns in Bulgaria to Bulgarian ones.

In foreign policy, Zveno's most notable act was to establish diplomatic relations with the USSR on 23 July 1934 and steer Bulgaria towards France. Kimon Georgiev saw that one way to do that was through improvement of the relationships with Yugoslavia and to bring the two countries closer as Bulgaria's neighbour was an ally of France at that time. As a result, king Aleksandar I of Yugoslavia visited Bulgaria on 27 September 1934. Since part of the Zveno activists and the Military Union were republicans, it had an anti-monarchist policy, so Tsar Boris III did not welcome the coup. With the aid of faithful Military Union officers, the tsar forced Kimon Georgiev to resign in January 1935 and appointed Pencho Zlatev in his place. From that point, the tsar had total control over the country, a state which would last until his death in 1943. The major political parties banned in 1934 were legalised after the 1944 coup d'état in which Zveno's leaders Kimon Georgiev, Damyan Velchev and Dimo Kazasov took an active part. After the 1944 coup, Georgiev would be appointed by the Fatherland Front as a prime minister thus becoming prime minister for the second time.

== See also ==
- Bulgarian coup d'état of 1923
- Bulgarian coup d'état of 1944

== Bibliography ==
- "За девети и деветнадесети..." (in Bulgarian). БГ История. Archived from the original on 2007-09-27.
- "Coup d'Etat in Sofia". The Times. 21 May 1934. p. 10.
- Делев, Петър; et al. (2006). "47. От парламентарна демокрация към авторитарен режим — 1931–1939". История и цивилизация за 11. клас (in Bulgarian). Труд, Сирма.
