= Todor Aleksandrov =

Bulgarian revolutionary (1881–1924)

Voivode Todor Aleksandrov
- Тодор Александров Попорушов
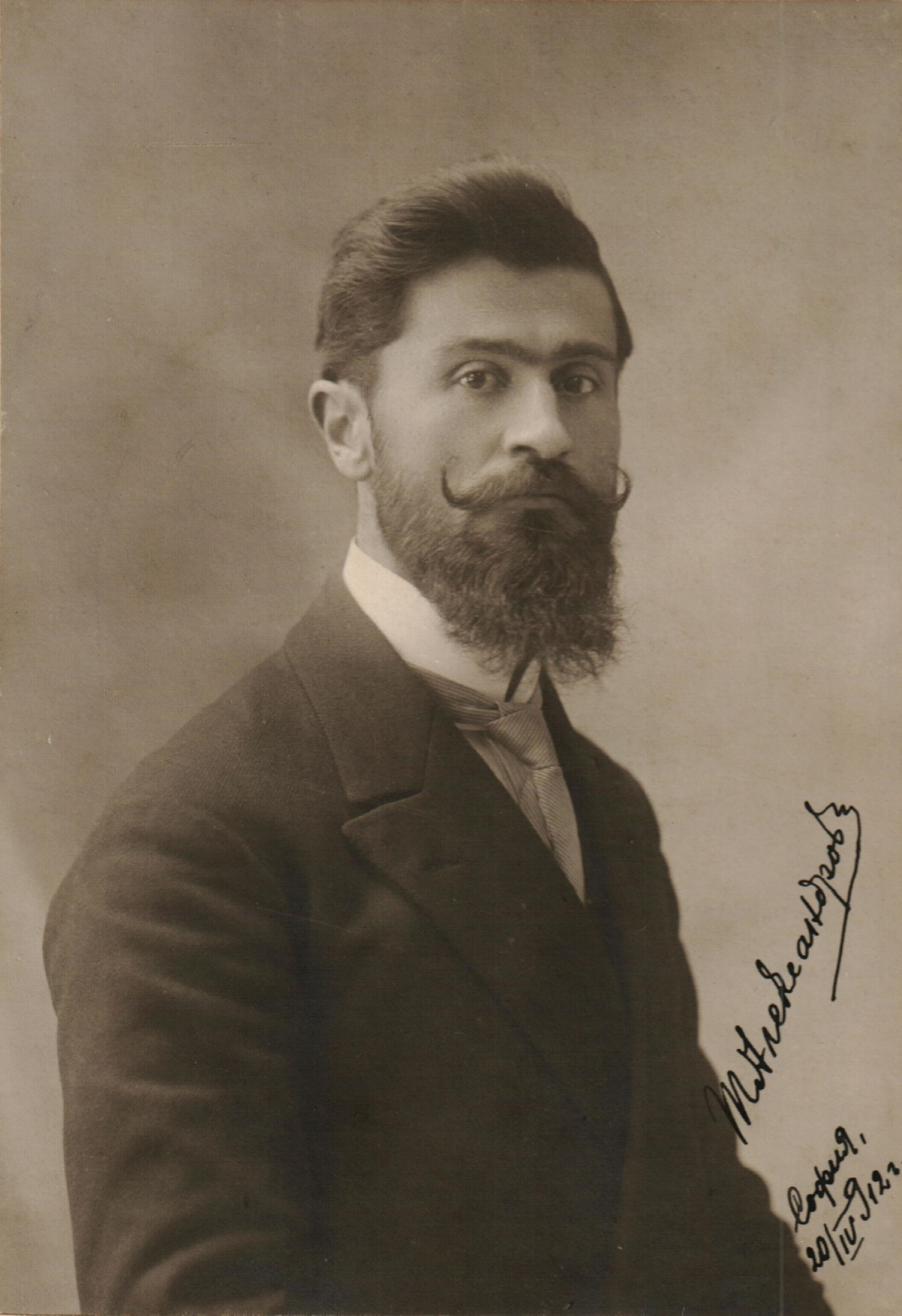
- A portrait of Aleksandrov with an autograph and dedication to Peyo Yavorov (Sofia, 1912).
- Born: Todor Aleksandrov Poporushov; 4 March 1881; Novo Selo, Kosovo Vilayet, Ottoman Empire
- Died: 31 August 1924 (aged 43); Sugarevo, Tsardom of Bulgaria
- Education: Bulgarian Pedagogical School of Skopje
- Children: 2
- Military career
- Allegiance: IMRO; Tsardom of Bulgaria
- Branch: Bulgarian Army
- Units: Macedonian-Adrianopolitan Volunteer Corps (Balkan Wars); 11th Macedonian Infantry Division (World War I)
- Conflicts: Balkan Wars; First Balkan War; Bulgarian front; Second Balkan War; World War I; Macedonian front; Toplica Uprising

Todor Aleksandrov Poporushov (Bulgarian/Macedonian: Тодор Александров Попорушов; 4 March 1881 – 31 August 1924), anglicised as Todor Alexandrov, was a Macedonian Bulgarian revolutionary, Bulgarian army officer, and teacher. He initially favoured the annexation of Macedonia to Bulgaria, but later switched to the idea of an Independent Macedonia as a second Bulgarian state on the Balkans. Aleksandrov was a member of the Internal Macedonian-Adrianople Revolutionary Organisation (IMARO) and later part of the Central Committee of the Internal Macedonian Revolutionary Organisation (IMRO), as well as its leader.

Aleksandrov, who was deemed "anti-Macedonian" in Yugoslav Macedonia, is still a controversial persona due to his pro-Bulgarian views in today North Macedonia, but there have been efforts to rehabilitate him. Though, this has caused political and public controversies.

== Life ==
=== Early life and revolutionary activity ===
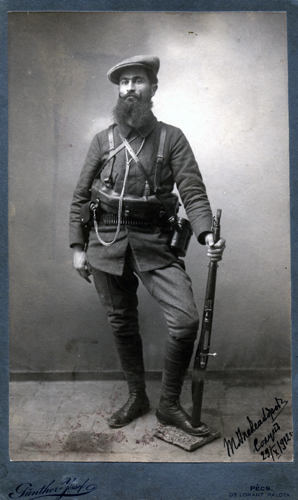
Aleksandrov in uniform of the Macedonian-Adrianopolitan Volunteer Corps of the Bulgarian Army during the Balkan Wars.

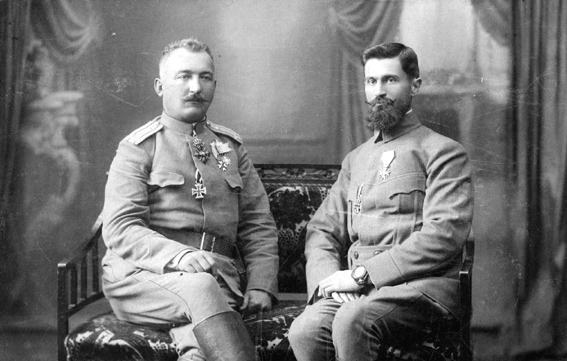
Todor Aleksandrov and Aleksandar Protogerov as Bulgarian Army officers during the First World War.

Aleksandrov was born in Novo Selo, Ottoman Empire (now North Macedonia), on 4 March 1881. Aleksandrov was of Bulgarian Orthodox origin. He was the second child and the only son of Aleksandar Poporushov and Maria Hadzhiyaneva. His father was a Bulgarian Exarchate teacher. Aleksandrov completed his four-year primary school and first grade at the progymnasium in Radoviš, where his father worked as a teacher. In 1893, he and his family returned to Štip, where he completed his secondary education. Despite his desire to continue his education at the Bulgarian Men's High School of Thessaloniki, due to insufficient funds from his parents, Aleksandrov enrolled in the Bulgarian Pedagogical School in Skopje, graduating in 1898. The director of the Pedagogical School, and at the same time his teacher, was Hristo Matov, an ideologist of the Internal Macedonian-Adrianopolitan Revolutionary Organisation. On the recommendation of Matov, Aleksandrov took the oath to join the Organisation in the academic year 1897–1898. Again, on the recommendation of Matov, Aleksandrov at the age of 17 was appointed as a teacher in Vinica, and then in Kočani and Kratovo, where he led the organisational districts. In the meantime, his father died, thus Aleksandrov together with his mother and his eldest sister Ekaterina, supported the family and the education of his younger sisters. Together with Pavel Shatev, he transported the explosives to Kočani, which were used in the 1903 Thessaloniki bombings. Although he did not directly participate in the Ilinden Uprising, he was directly involved in the preparations for the revolt in Kočani. Among his supporters, he came to be known as "Old Man" or "Uncle Todor". He was arrested by the Ottoman authorities on 27 March 1903 for "involvement in the secret correspondence of the Bulgarian bandit rebels and in managing the rebel affairs" and sent to Skopje under police escort. He was sentenced to five years in prison and served 13 months in the Kuršumli An prison in Skopje. In prison, Aleksandrov mastered the French language and strengthened his ties with the activists of the Skopje revolutionary district.

On 12 April 1904, he was released after an amnesty. After his amnesty, he was appointed as a teacher in Novo Selo, where as a member of the District Management Body, he worked in the restoration and construction of the Štip revolutionary district, together with Todor Lazarov and Mishe Razvigorov, in which they succeeded. In November of the same year, due to his organisational activity, the Ottoman authorities forbade him from teaching and banned him from schools. In 1905, he became the secretary of the Skopje district. He went to Burgas, where he was a teacher in the 1906/1907 school year. In 1907, when he learned about the death of Razvigorov, he resigned from his position in Burgas and returned to Ottoman Macedonia to take his place, with whom he was very close. He was soon appointed secretary of the Kočani district voivode Simeon Georgiev. At the Third Regular Congress of the Skopje revolutionary district, held from 8 to 14 November 1907, he was elected as the district's voivode. After the assassination of Boris Sarafov and Ivan Garvanov, his rapid rise to power in the Organisation begun. In November 1907, Matov appointed him as the treasurer of the Organisation and Aleksandrov became his right hand man. Aleksandrov organised dynamite attacks against the Ottoman Empire in 1909. After negotiations in Sofia in 1911, the Bulgarian People's Macedonian-Adrianople Revolutionary Organization united with the Secret Macedonian-Adrianople Revolutionary Organization. In 1911, he became part of the new Internal Macedonian-Adrianopolitan Revolutionary Organisation's Central Committee.

=== Participation in wars and aftermath ===
He took part in the Balkan Wars as a Bulgarian Army commander of the Macedonian-Adrianopolitan Volunteer Corps. In this period, he favoured the annexation of Macedonia by Bulgaria. During Bulgarian occupation of Serbia in World War I, along with Aleksandar Protogerov, he took over the region of Štip. He was an officer in the 11th Macedonian Infantry Division. The IMRO detachments then served as a gendarmerie corps, working hand in glove to Bulgarianise the occupied region. As a Bulgarian military officer, he also participated in the violent suppression of the Serbian Toplica Uprising in 1917. He had received the Order of Military Merit.

By the end of the war, Aleksandrov married Evangeliya (Vangelia) Bayaltsalieva, with whom he had two children - Aleksandar and Maria. After World War I, he proposed an autonomous Macedonia with Salonika as the capital. In a letter to Vladimir Karamfilov dated 6 July 1919, he wrote that the autonomy of Macedonia was set "as a stage", which was advocated not only by the founders, but also by all the activists of the Organisation. This stage was part of the struggle for the annexation of Macedonia to Bulgaria. Aleksandrov self-identified as a Macedonian Bulgarian. In 1919, the Internal Macedonian Revolutionary Organisation (IMRO) was restored, with him, Aleksandar Protogerov and Petar Chaulev being part of the Central Committee. However, Aleksandrov was recognised as the leader and many people called it "Aleksandrov's VMRO." IMRO's left-wing distrusted him and questioned the authenticity of his autonomist agenda, seeing him as a proponent of the Bulgarian annexationist agenda. Hristo Tatarchev and Hristo Silyanov also challenged the right of the members of the new Central Committee to lead the Organisation, since they had not been elected at a regular congress, and criticised their role during World War I. Yugoslav authorities regarded him and Protogerov as war criminals. Both him and Protogerov were arrested by the Bulgarian Agrarian authorities after they came to power in August 1919, who charged them with war crimes, but they managed to escape with the help of Bulgarian officers on 13 November 1919. Afterward, they established a stronghold of the IMRO in the Petrich district, which they ran like an independent state. Taxes were also imposed on the locals and funds were given by the Italian authorities, who were supporting them against Yugoslavia.

Before the 1920 Constitutional Assembly election in the Kingdom of Serbs, Croats and Slovenes (Yugoslavia), he encouraged people in Vardar Macedonia to vote for communist candidates. The Minister of Interior Aleksandar Dimitrov ordered the arrest of the IMRO leaders, but they went underground. During Dimitrov's campaign against the IMRO, Aleksandrov declared IMRO left-winger and Bulgarian Agrarian National Union ally Gyorche Petrov as a "pacifist" and a danger to the autonomy of Macedonia and at the same time condemning him as a collaborator of Bulgarian prime minister Aleksandar Stamboliyski and Dimitrov, ordering his assassination on 28 June 1921. His bands made attacks into Vardar Macedonia, controlled by Kingdom of Serbs, Croats and Slovenes. Such acts constantly disturbed the government of the Kingdom of Serbs, Croats and Slovenes, but also the European public. European political circles saw in him the greatest danger to peace in the Balkans, declaring his activities outside the laws and diplomatic conventions and negotiations. However, some foreign correspondents from the Balkans admired his armed actions in Vardar Macedonia, exalting him as the "last hero of Macedonia", "last king of the mountains", "Macedonian Robin Hood", and the "uncrowned king of Macedonia". After IMRO's participation in the 9 June 1923 overthrow of Stamboliyski, his men led by Velichko Velyanov, tortured and murdered Stamboliyski. In August, under his orders, IMRO revolutionary Yordan Tsitsonkov assassinated Bulgarian Agrarian politician Rayko Daskalov. IMRO also participated in the suppression of the 1923 September uprising, organised by the Bulgarian Communist Party.

He was not satisfied with the new Bulgarian government led by Aleksandar Tsankov and turned to Soviet Union's support. As Aleksandrov's envoy, Dimitar Vlahov negotiated with the Comintern. In 1924, in Vienna, he signed the May Manifesto along with Protogerov and Chaulev, declaring IMRO's fight for an independent Macedonia in an alliance with the communists. He had also made an agreement with the communists against an uprising, but they had violated it in September 1923. Aleksandrov told Vlahov not to publish the May Manifesto, but Vlahov refused to obey, publishing the contents of the Manifesto on 28 July 1924 in the La Fédération Balkanique (Balkan Federation) newspaper. Under pressure by the Bulgarian government, Aleksandrov and Protogerov promptly denied in a declaration on 1 August through the Bulgarian press that they have ever signed any agreement, claiming that the May Manifesto was a communist forgery. On 31 August 1924, a conference of the Serres revolutionary district was convened. Aleksandrov set out to attend the congress, despite the warnings of Kiril Parlichev and Ivan Mihailov not to go alone to Petrich, where his rivals would be expecting him. Accompanied by Protogerov, Aleksandrov was shot dead in the back by IMRO voivodes Shteryu Vlahov and Dincho Vretenarov of the Petrich district, near the village Sugarevo, while his bodyguard was also killed. His assassination is mysterious. The assassins were closely related with the pro-communist IMRO voivode and rival Alekso Vasilev. IMRO blamed a pro-communist faction for the assassination, but others blamed circles close to the Bulgarian throne. The Bulgarian government blamed the left-wing for his assassination. Members of IMRO's left-wing were later killed, while his killers killed themselves after being cornered by IMRO. A memorial service was held in his honour in Sofia, attended by around 10,000 people.

== Legacy ==
Macedonian emigrant organisations and brotherhoods in Bulgaria in the interwar period honoured him. The Macedonian historiography in the Yugoslav era regarded Aleksandrov as part of a group of "bulgarianised renegades of the Macedonian revolutionary and liberation movement". It also considered him as anti-Macedonian. The historiography then also considered his IMRO as fascist. Aleksandrov also had negative reception in the People's Republic of Bulgaria due to his participation in the suppression of the local Communist rebellion in 1923, but he was partially rehabilitated in the 1980s. After the independence of present-day North Macedonia, efforts were made by Macedonian politicians and historians to rehabilitate Aleksandrov. Most Macedonian historians have regarded him as "the biggest traitor to the Macedonian cause" due to his pro-Bulgarian views for a long time, while other historians have called him out for his alleged involvement in many assassinations of other IMRO members and other political and military figures of the time. On the other hand, other historians have referred to him as "the soul and the brain of the Macedonian resistance" and as "Macedonia's Robin Hood", attributing to him remarkable organisational skills and will. VMRO-Union of Macedonian Associations also was inspired by his legacy. A boulevard in Sofia, Bulgaria, was named after him in the 1990s.

A local association of Bulgarians raised a monument of the revolutionary on 2 February 2008 in the city of Veles. After the local administration refused to provide a place for the bust, it was raised in the yard of a local Bulgarian resident. In the following night the resident received a number of threats and the monument was twice thrown down by unknown individuals. Soon after, the monument was removed at the insistence of local authorities, as an unlawful construction. This incident caused Bulgarian president Georgi Parvanov to call upon the Macedonian government to review the history of Aleksandrov's deeds on his meeting with Branko Crvenkovski in the town of Sandanski. In June 2012, a new statue called "Macedonian Equestrian Revolutionary" was erected in Skopje. As a consequence, an outcry among older residents erupted almost immediately when they noted the anonymous rider's similarity to the historical figure. Earlier the same month the opposition Social Democrats took to the streets to protest the changing of hundreds of street names, including a bridge that was to be named after Aleksandrov. In October, a few months after the setting of the monument, a board appeared on it with the name of Todor Aleksandrov.

In March 2021, the new Skopje municipal council majority by the Social Democratic Union of Macedonia decided to rename the names of many local sites. Thus, the bridge named after Aleksandrov and the street named after the organisation he led - IMRO, were renamed. The former Skopje Mayor from VMRO-DPMNE Koce Trajanovski reacted that his successor Petre Šilegov has deleted part from the Macedonian history at the request of Bulgaria. A monument of Aleksandrov was erected in his birthplace of Novo Selo, Štip, in August 2024. He had been honoured by VMRO-DPMNE governments between 2006 and 2017. Aleksandrov Peak on Graham Land, Antarctica, is named after Todor Aleksandrov.

== Memorials ==
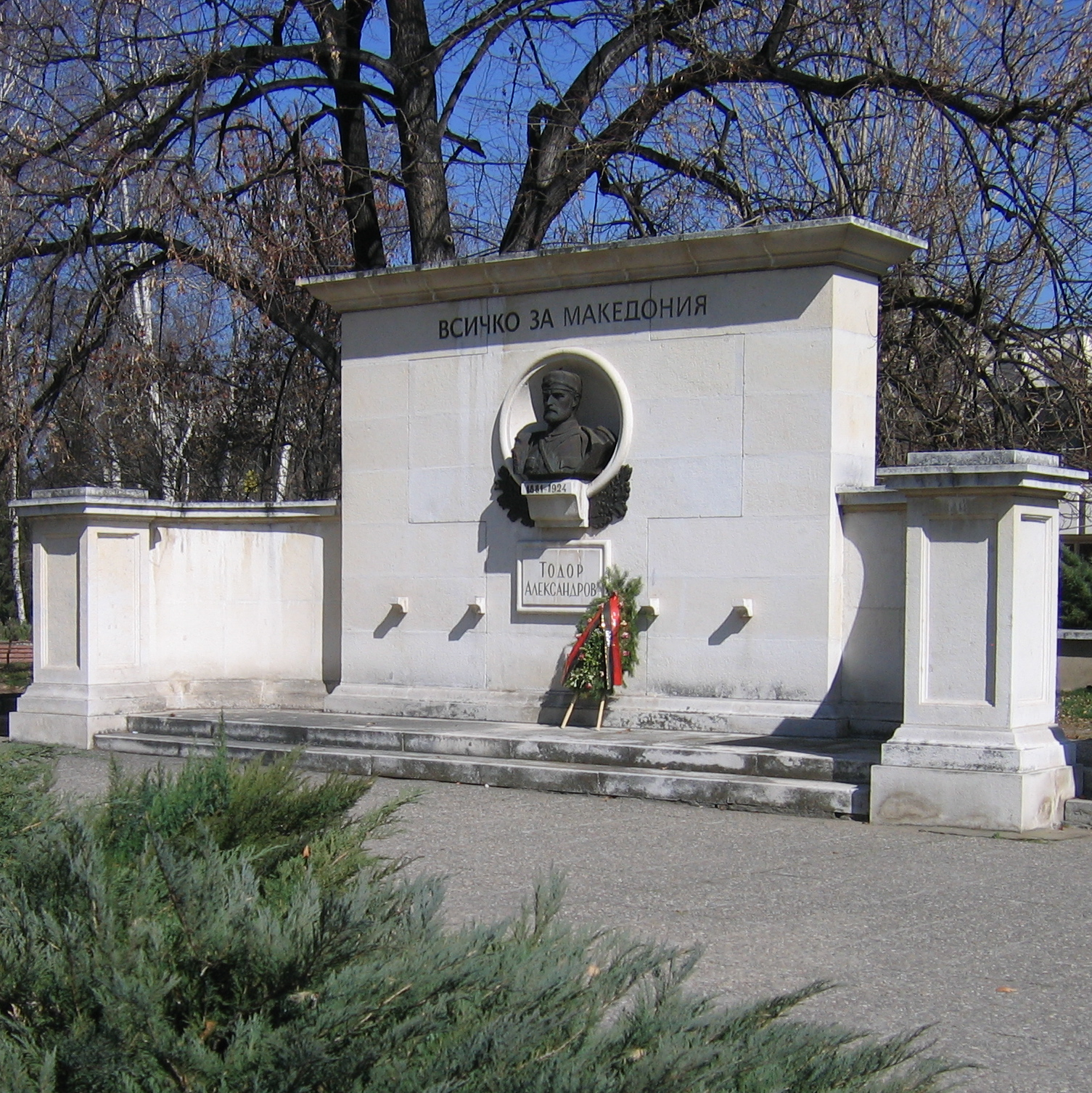
Monument of Aleksandrov in Kyustendil, Bulgaria.

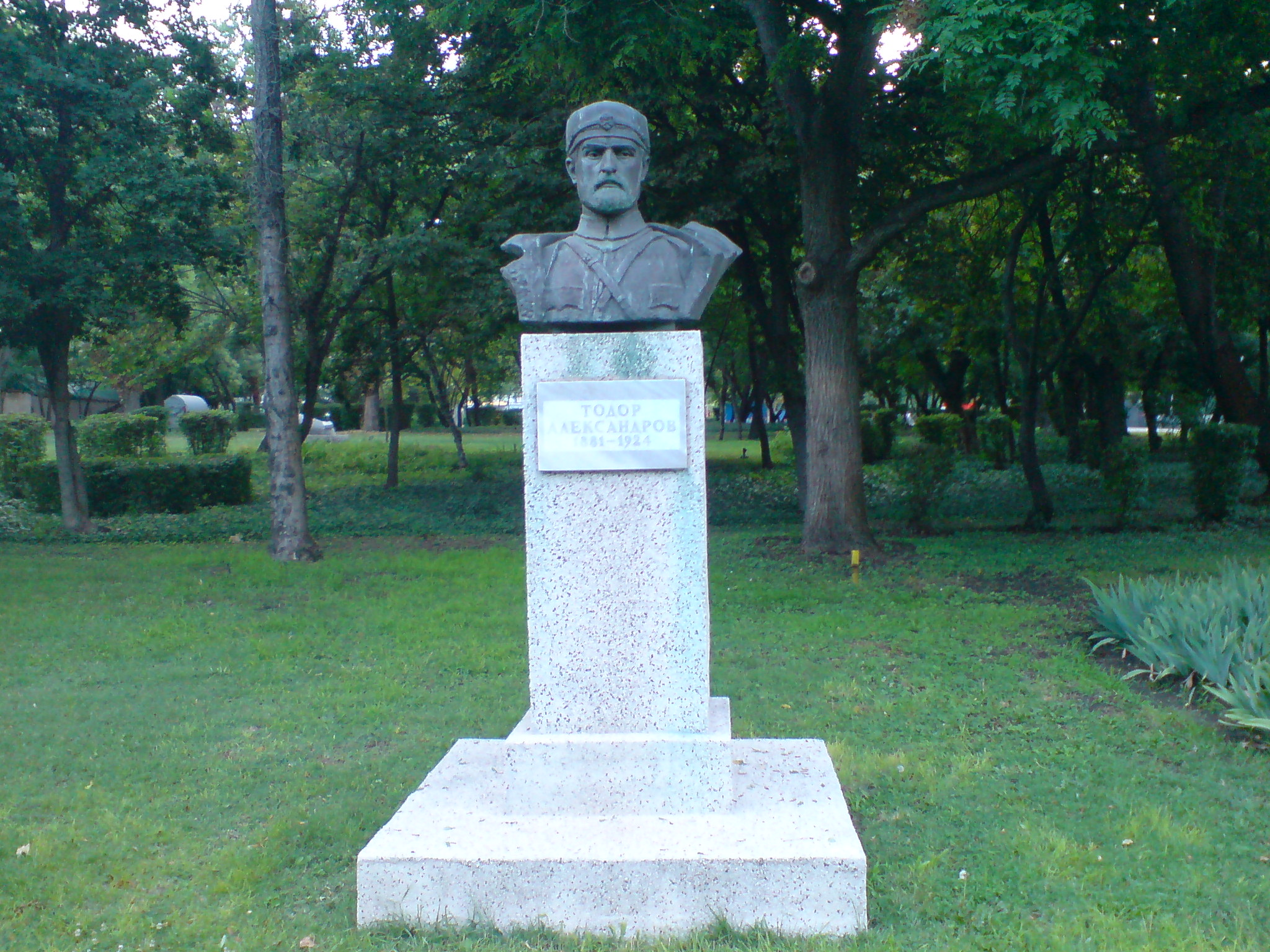
Monument of Aleksandrov in Burgas, Bulgaria.

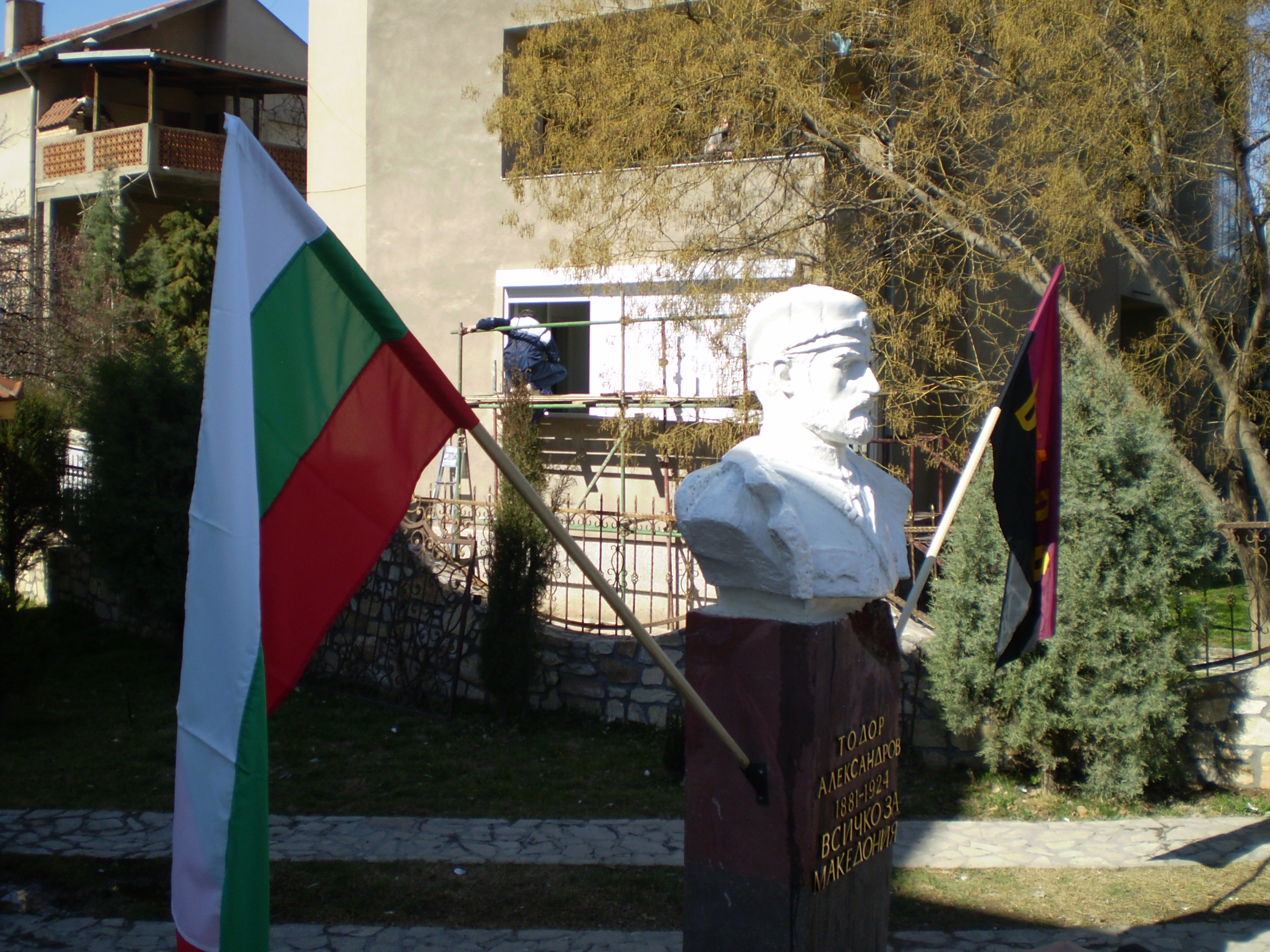
Monument of Aleksandrov in Veles, Macedonia, demounted in 2008.

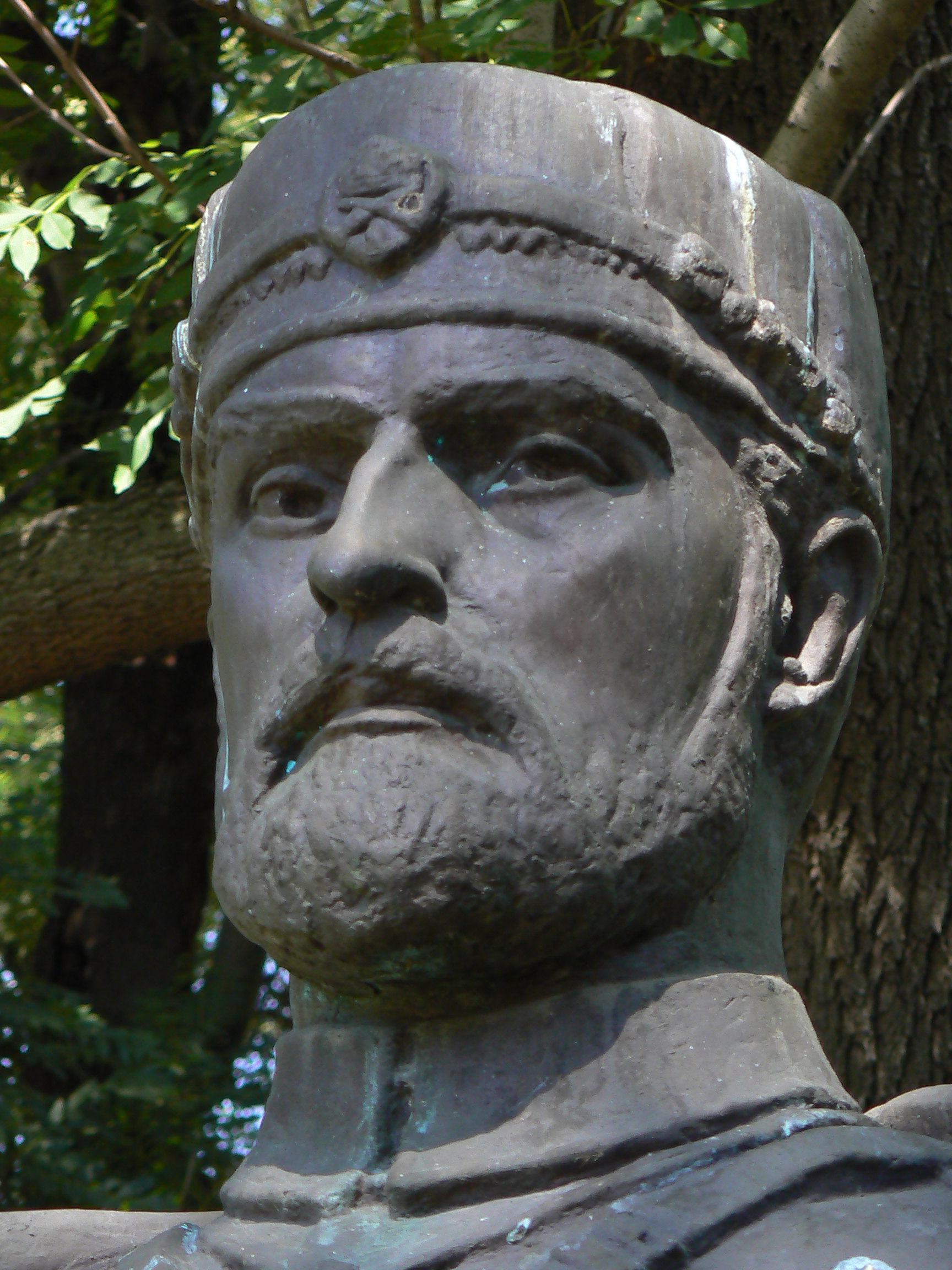
Bust of Todor Aleksandrov in Sofia, Bulgaria.

== See also ==
- Vardar Banovina
- History of Bulgaria (1878–1946)
