= Yordan Tsitsonkov =

Bulgarian revolutionary

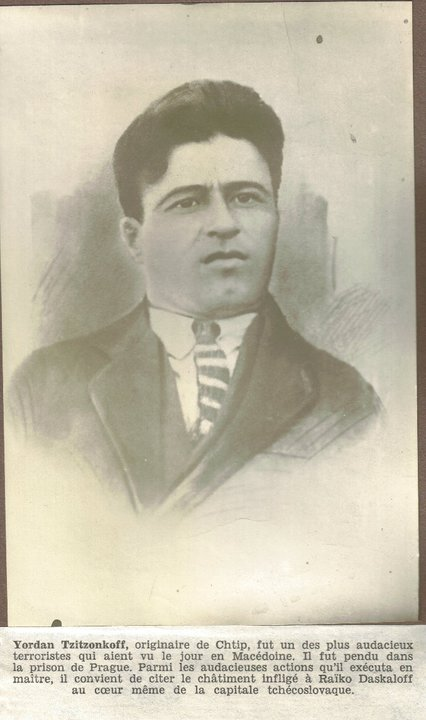

Yordan Tsitsonkov (Bulgarian: Йоордан Цицонков, 1900 – 23 January 1926) was a Bulgarian revolutionary from Ottoman Macedonia and activist of the Internal Macedonian Revolutionary Organization (IMRO), who assassinated the exiled Bulgarian politician Rayko Daskalov on 26 August 1923.

== Biography ==
Born in 1900, Tsictsonkov originates from Štip, which at this time was part of the Ottoman Empire. During and after the Balkan Wars the control of the region changed repeatedly between the Kingdom of Serbia (later the Kingdom of Serbs, Croats and Slovenes) and the Tsardom of Bulgaria, while nowadays it is part of the Republic of North Macedonia. As most of the Slavic population of Macedonia until the early-20th century, the Ciconkov's self-identified ethnicity was Bulgarian

He joined the Internal Macedonian Revolutionary Organization, an insurrectionary movement for liberation of Macedonia from Yugoslav occupation, at an early age. The IMRO was in heavy opposition to the Bulgarian prime minister Aleksandar Stamboliyski who wanted to establish a closer bilateral friendship with Yugoslavia. In the aftermath of World War I, the IMRO developed an agenda for an autonomous Macedonia, under the protectorate of the Great Powers, that meant in fact a "second Bulgarian state" on the Balkans. It accepted this concept with the aim to annex the Macedonian territories annexed by Yugoslavia and Greece. In March 1922 he was given the task of assassinating Rayko Daskalov, a fierce opponent of the IMRO, who held a number of posts in Stamboliyski's Bulgarian Agrarian National Union (BANU) government and commanded the paramilitary Orange Guard. Daskalov would face an attempt on his life by the IMRO on 15 December 1922 by the komitadji Asen Daskalov, who threw a bomb at Daskalov's car in Sofia. He escaped unharmed.

In March 1923 Stamboliyski signed the Treaty of Niš, which obliged the Tsardom of Bulgaria to suppress the operations of the IMRO carried out from Bulgarian territory. This event caused an intensification of IMRO actions against the BANU government, which eventually would spell its end. Rayko Daskalov had left his ministries in February, and in May he arrived in the Czechoslovak capital of Prague as Bulgaria's envoy to the country. The same month vojvoda Pancho Mikhailov (1891–1925) gave Ciconkov a fake passport with the name "Atanas Nikolov", a revolver, and a large sum of money. The young man was sent to Czechoslovakia, to complete his mission. The order had been authorized by the IMRO leader Todor Aleksandrov.

On 9 June, the BANU government was ousted by a right-wing political alliance and the Bulgarian military in a coup d'état. The IMRO aided the coup. Stamboliyski himself was captured while attempting to organize a peasant resistance, and was brutally tortured and executed by the IMRO. The rest of his government likewise collapsed, leaving Daskalov in Prague to form a government-in-exile and attempt to create foreign pressure against the new government of Aleksandar Tsankov.

On 26 August 1923, Ciconkov approached Daskalov on Holeček Street in the Smíchov district of Prague, and killed him with three shots. He was immediately arrested. The IMRO took responsibility for defending him, and hired the well-known Czech nationalist lawyer Jan Renner and the famous painter Professor Ivan Mrkvička to speak in his defence. He was released not long afterwards, after during a 13–14 November Prague trial the jury sentenced him to only 48 hours in jail, with 8 votes against 4, under the argument that he had not acted on behalf of the Tsankov government, and had committed the deed under pressure from death threats by the IMRO.

Strong Serbian diplomatic pressure however forced a re-trial, which took place between 22 and 27 October 1924 in Tábor. Although the prosecution again tried and failed to prove a connection to the Democratic Alliance and Tsankov, Ciconkov was sentenced to 20 years in prison this time around, which were to be spent in Tábor prison. After the authorities received information that he was planning an escape he was transferred to the maximum security prison Kartouzi in Ichin. There he took his own life on 23 January 1926, by hanging.

Today, a bilingual Czech–Bulgarian commemorative plaque marks the site of Daskalov's assassination in Smíchov, Prague. The plaque describes Daskalov as a "great Slav and a fighter for freedom, democracy and republicanism".

== See also ==
- Internal Macedonian Revolutionary Organization
