= Svetla Daskalova =

Bulgarian politician

- Светла Даскалова

Minister of Justice
- In office 1966–1990
- Preceded by: Peter Tanchev
- Succeeded by: Pencho Penev

Personal details
- Born: 18 November 1921 Sofia
- Died: 2008 (aged 86–87)
- Party: Bulgarian Agrarian National Union
- Education: Sofia University
- Occupation: Politician; lawyer

Svetla Daskalova (1921–2008) was a Bulgarian politician who served as the country's Minister of Justice from 1966 until 1990, during the communist rule. She was the first woman to serve in the role.

== Early life and education ==
Svetla Daskalova was born in Sofia on 18 November 1921. She was the daughter of Rayko Daskalov, an interwar politician who led the Radomir Rebellion and his wife Nevena, an agrarian sympathiser from an affluent Sofia family. She had one brother, Stefan. Her father was assassinated on 26 August 1923.

Daskalova graduated from the German High School in Sofia and then studied law at Sofia University, graduating in 1944.

== Career ==
After the coup on 9 September 1944, Daskalova became involved in the Bulgarian Agrarian National Union and in 1946, she was elected to the Grand National Assembly as a member of the opposition. After the liquidation of the opposition in 1947, she was arrested by State Security on 7 April 1951, and spent time in the Belene labour camp. She was released in 1952.

After her release, Daskalova became a lawyer and began to collaborate with the communist regime. From 1955 to 1962, she worked at the Law Institute. She was again elected to Parliament in 1958. In March 1963, as Vice President of the People's Assembly Bureau, she spoke at the Fifth Congress of the Fatherland Front about the role of the Front in "democratizing public life and enlisting the participation of the broadest public circles in running the country."

Daskalova was a member of the Bulgarian delegation to the UN's first World Conference on Women in Mexico City in 1975. She was profiled in an interview series with communist women leaders by the German magazine Für Dich the same year.

Daskavloa served as deputy leader of the Bulgarian Agrarian National Union from 1989 to 1990. During the fall of communism in 1989, she put forward the proposal for the creation of a widely based government of national consensus, dismantling the totalitarian system and including the participation of the opposition parties and movements. She later issued advice regarding the decriminalisation of defection that said, "Failure to return within the appointed time will be considered an administrative offence ...[Offenders] will not be treated as political emigrants and can return to Bulgaria without fear of persecution by the state."

On 3 January 1990, Daskalova was a signatory to the "Agreement for Dialogue" that established the Round Table Talks to work towards a peaceful transition to democracy.

== Death ==
Daskalova died in 2008 in Sofia.
