= Daskalov =

Daskalov (Bulgarian: Даскалов) is a surname. Notable people with the surname include:

- Georgi Daskalov (born 1981), Bulgarian footballer
- Rayko Daskalov (1886–1923), Bulgarian interwar politician of the Bulgarian Agrarian National Union
- Reyan Daskalov (born 1995), Bulgarian footballer
