= Radomir Rebellion =

1918 rebellion of Bulgarian soldiers

- Part of World War I
Date	27 September – 2 October 1918
Location	Tsardom of Bulgaria
Result	Loyalist victory

Belligerents
Rebels	Tsardom of Bulgaria

Commanders and leaders
Rayko Daskalov (WIA)	Aleksandar Protogerov

Units involved
Unknown	German 217th Division

Strength
15,000 (6,000–7,000 for final assault on capital); 8 infantry battalions and 2 machine-gun companies	

Casualties and losses
2,500–3,000 killed 2,000 captured 10,000 wounded	

The Radomir Rebellion, also known as Vladaya Uprising and Soldiers' Uprising, was a revolt by Bulgarian soldiers in 1918 during World War I in the Tsardom of Bulgaria.

== Background ==
Bulgaria was involved in World War I on the side of the Central Powers and participated in the Macedonian front. In September 1918, Bulgaria was defeated at Dobro Pole and World War I was coming to an end in the Balkans. While some Bulgarian units retreated orderly, other units (from the Second Balkan Division and the Third Thracian Division) were in disarray and were enraged at Tsar Ferdinand and their politicians due to the bad conditions (such as lack of food and clothing) they had and the defeat. On 24 September, they mutinied and captured the army headquarters at Kyustendil, arrested all of the officers (later freed) and went to the southwestern town Radomir. As a result, the Bulgarian government released Aleksandar Stamboliyski of the Bulgarian Agrarian National Union (BANU) from prison (who was imprisoned for his opposition to the war) and sent him along with fellow Agrarian politician Rayko Daskalov, an army general and prominent political figures, to convince the soldiers to back down. On 25 September, Bulgaria decided to ask the Entente for a ceasefire. On the next day, the delegation arrived at Radomir on 8:00 pm, where Stamboliyski met with Sergeant Major Georgi Damyanov, who was an Agrarian sympathizer and in command of the battalion encampment at Radomir. On the next day, at 9:00 am, the delegation entered the soldiers' camp, where Stamboliyski tried to convince the soldiers to back down until an armistice was reached. The soldiers were not convinced. The delegation continued to Kyustendil and visited the Staff Headquarters. Afterward, Stamboliyski went to the rebel-controlled railroad station to speak to the soldiers, but he was interrupted and summoned to the telegraph office. Daskalov informed him with a telegram that over 15,000 soldiers were in Radomir and had enough locomotives and cars to carry out an assault on the capital Sofia. Daskalov had also prepared a draft of the proclamation of a provisional government.

== Rebellion ==
On 27 September, Daskalov addressed the soldiers in Radomir with the following proclamation:

Today, September 27, 1918, the Bulgarian people break the chains of slavery, throw down the despotic regime of Ferdinand and his henchmen, proclaim them enemies of the people, proclaim themselves a free people with a republican form of government, and hold out the hand of peace and understanding to the peoples of Europe. From this day Tsar Ferdinand and his dynasty and the former government are fallen. All provincial administrators, district officials, police commandants, mayors, and military officers will carry out the orders of the provisional government of the republic.

Stamboliyski was declared as the prime minister of the provisional government, while Daskalov became Commander-in-Chief of the rebels. Daskalov named Georgi Damyanov as Chief-of-Staff and organized eight infantry battalions with two machine-gun companies. On 9:00 pm, he sent a telegram to the Bulgarian government with a threat that if it did not recognize the provisional government, he would assault the capital. Daskalov and Stamboliyski went their separate ways - Stamboliyski went to the capital, while Daskalov went to Pernik, to prepare for the assault with his soldiers.

Stamboliyski went to the Council of Ministers, where he denied having any involvement in the rebellion, claiming that both his and Daskalov's actions were under duress, and that they both were prisoners of the soldiers. The council did not believe him and ordered his arrest after his departure. Stamboliyski had to go into hiding but he also unsuccessfully attempted to organize an internal uprising to support Daskalov's assault. Factions of the parliamentary group attributed the responsibility for the rebellion solely on Daskalov, condemned it in a vote and voiced support for the government so that an armistice can be reached. Because the rebels did not cut off its communications, the government was able to make an appeal to the Germans for help. The rebels moved to the village Vladaya, six miles outside the capital. At 9:00 am on 29 September, Daskalov repeated the same threat to the government in a telegram. He began the assault at 4:00 pm and organized his soldiers into three columns, tasked with capturing the villages Boyana, Knyazhevo, and Gorna Banya, located on the southwestern outskirts of the capital. The loyalist forces led by general Aleksandar Protogerov mounted a fierce defense of the city. They struck the central column under the command of Daskalov with heavy artillery fire, wounding him and Damyanov. However, the rebels were able to capture the villages. On the same day, Bulgaria signed an armistice in Thessaloniki. Daskalov waited until the next day to launch the final assault on the city, due to his desire to avoid looting and bloodshed. This gap allowed the defenders of the city to re-group and gain reinforcements from the German 217th Division, who were brought from Crimea and were well-equipped with machine guns and artillery. After the news about the armistice reached the rebels, they deserted en masse. The final assault begun on 5:00 am, when only 6,000–7,000 rebels remained, but they were defeated by the loyalist forces. The battle resulted in 2,500–3,000 rebels being killed, while 2,000 were captured. The loyalist forces managed to break through the lines and captured Radomir on 2 October. Due to the rebellion, 10,000 were wounded.

== Aftermath ==
After the rebellion, Daskalov was hidden by Agrarian sympathizers in a village near Radomir and was rescued by Aleksandar Dimitrov, who took him to Thessaloniki, where he came under the jurisdiction of French authorities, while Stamboliyski went into hiding in Sofia again. BANU leaders made a request to the French authorities to allow Daskalov and Stamboliyski to go to France so that they can escape the treason charges but they turned down the request, wanting to discourage rebellions. Although the rebellion ended in defeat, on 3 October, Tsar Ferdinand abdicated in favor of his son Boris III and left Bulgaria. Food was still in short supply and there was mainly United States-imported wheat for the Bulgarian towns. The rebellion was a prelude to the rise of BANU to power. Immediately after the war, a democratic government under prime minister Teodor Teodorov was established, in a coalition with the Social Democrats and the Agrarians. Stamboliyski was later amnestied and became part of Todorov's government.
