= Aleksandar Protogerov =

Bulgarian general, politician and revolutionary

- Александър Протогеров
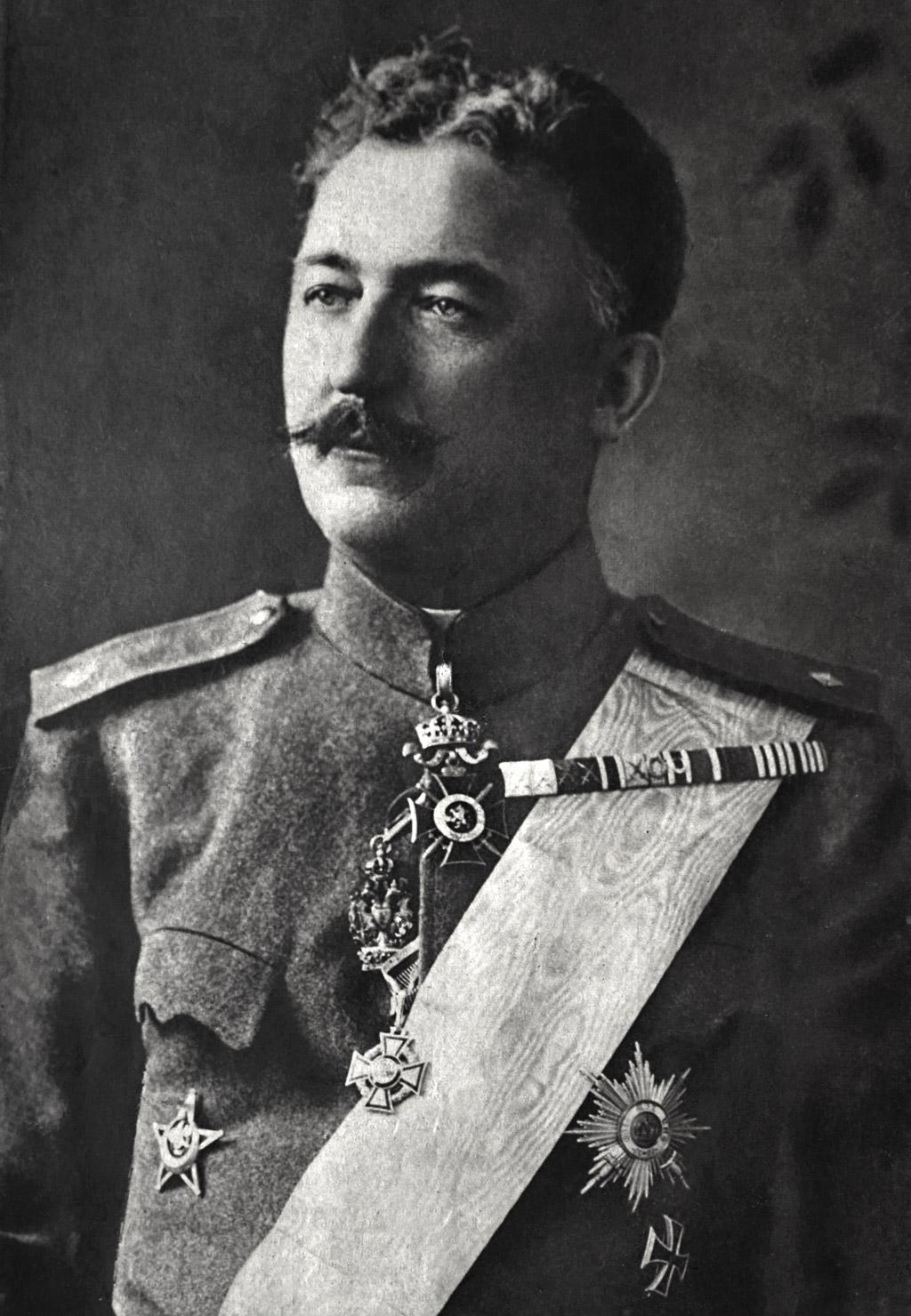
- Born: 28 February 1867; Ohrid, Ottoman Empire
- Died: 7 July 1928 (aged 61); Sofia, Bulgaria
- Military career
- Allegiance: (Tsardom of Bulgaria (1908–1946)) Tsardom of Bulgaria, SMAC; IMRO
- Branch: Bulgarian Army
- Rank: Lieutenant General
- Conflicts: Gorna Dzhumaya Uprising; Ilinden-Preobrazhenie Uprising; Balkan Wars; First Balkan War; Bulgarian front; Second Balkan War; World War I; Toplica Uprising; Radomir Rebellion

Aleksandar Protogerov (Bulgarian: Александър Протогеров; 28 February 1867 – 7 July 1928) was a Bulgarian Army general, politician and revolutionary. He was among the leaders of the Supreme Macedonian-Adrianople Committee and the Internal Macedonian Revolutionary Organization.

== Biography ==
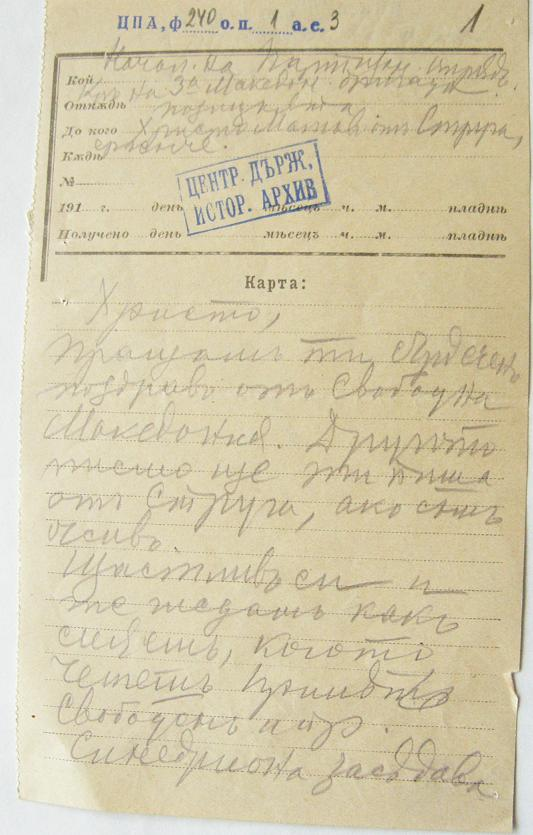
Congratulatory telegram from Protogerov to Hristo Matov in relation with the invasion of Macedonia by the Bulgarian Army in 1915.: „Hristo, I send you cordial greetings from Free Macedonia.“

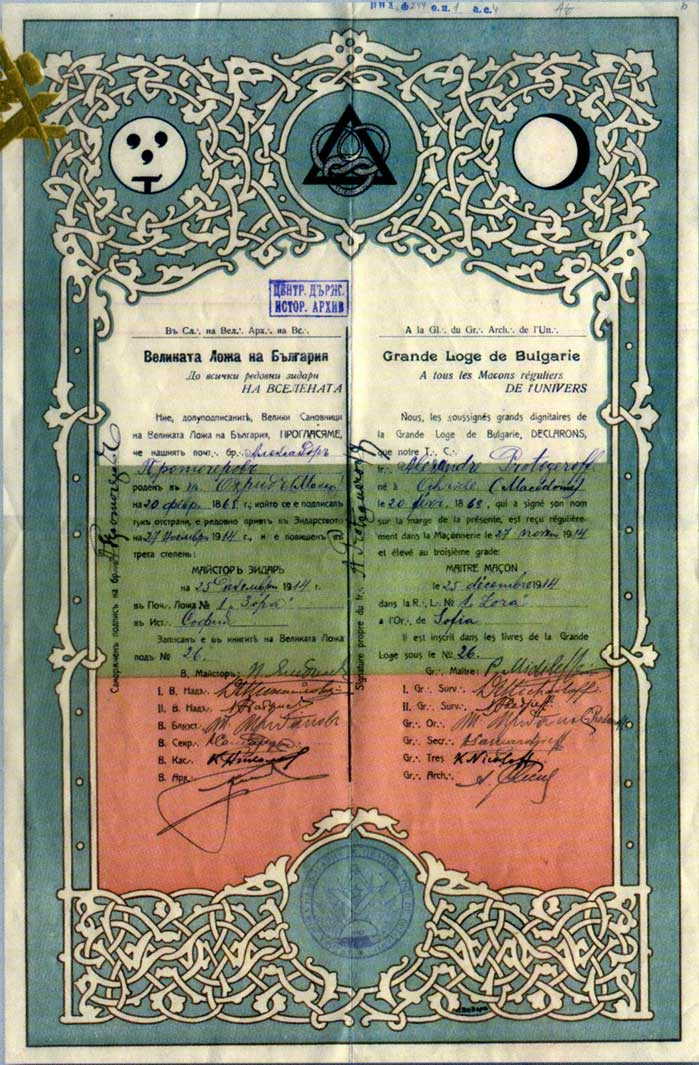
Protogerov's certificate from the Grand Lodge of Bulgaria.

Protogerov was born on 28 February 1867 in Ohrid in the Ottoman Empire (now in North Macedonia). Later he completed his primary education there in the local Bulgarian Exarchate school. On 5 October 1882 he entered the Military School in Sofia and was a volunteer in the Serbo-Bulgarian War (1885). In 1887, he graduated from the Military School and was assigned to the infantry. On 18 May 1890, he was already a lieutenant. On 2 August 1894 he became a captain and served as an adjutant in the 1st Brigade of the 5th Danube Infantry Division. He served in Rousse, where he was the leader of the Bulgarian Officers' Brotherhoods. Later he served as a company commander of the 32nd Zagore Infantry Regiment. As a Bulgarian officer, he was also a member of the Supreme Macedonian-Adrianople Committee. Protogerov took part in the Gorna Dzhumaya uprising in 1902 and in the Ilinden-Preobrazhenie Uprising in 1903. Later he joined the Internal Macedonian Revolutionary Organization (IMRO).

Protogerov was a Bulgarian Freemason and held a leading position (Grand Master) in the lodge where he was a member since the 1910s. In the Balkan Wars, Protogerov was one of the organizers of the Macedonian-Adrianopolitan Volunteer Corps and Assistant Commander of this military unit. From 1912 to 1918 he was the president of the executive committee of the Macedonian charitable brotherhoods in Bulgaria. During World War I, he commanded the Third Infantry Brigade of the 11th Macedonian Infantry Division. Protogerov captured the region of Štip, together with Todor Aleksandrov. In late October, he ordered the massacre of 120 wounded and ill Serbian prisoners of war from the Štip hospital, who were killed in a village near Štip by units of the 11th Division and komitadjis under the command of voyvoda Ivan Yanev Barlev. In early March, he became the chief of the Morava area. The Bulgarian Supreme Command chose him because he had experience in guerrilla warfare and was active in the pro-Bulgarian IMRO. He regarded the Serbs as the worst enemies. On 10 March, he gave the rebels the ultimatum to surrender within five days. Within fifteen days, he defeated the rebels. The army under his command and his IMRO units repressed civilians, destroyed many villages, killed thousands of people and committed mass rape. Atrocities continued in the next months under his successors, Colonel Tasev (who replaced him as chief) and Lieutenant Colonel Durvingov (who was chosen by Protogerov). In 1918, as a commander of Sofia's garrison, he suppressed the Radomir Rebellion, which was a revolt by Bulgarian soldiers. Yugoslav authorities regarded him and Aleksandrov as war criminals.

After World War I, In 1919, IMRO was restored, with him, Todor Aleksandrov and Petar Chaulev being part of the Central Committee. However, Aleksandrov was recognized as the leader and many people called it "Aleksandrov's VMRO." In the same year, on behalf of the executive committee of Macedonian Societies, he sent a letter to the Paris Peace Conference, requesting the incorporation of Macedonia into Bulgaria. However, Vardar Macedonia was ceded to the Kingdom of Serbs, Croats and Slovenes. Both him and Aleksandrov were arrested by the Bulgarian Agrarian authorities after they came to power in August 1919, who charged them with war crimes, but they managed to escape with the help of Bulgarian officers on 13 November 1919. Afterward, they established a stronghold of the IMRO in the Petrich district, which they ran like an independent state. Taxes were also imposed on the locals and funds were given by the Italian authorities, who were supporting them against Yugoslavia. The Minister of Interior Aleksandar Dimitrov ordered the arrest of the IMRO leaders, but they went underground. He signed an agreement in November 1920 with Albanian representative Hasan Bey Prishtina, stipulating the 'liberation of Macedonia in her ethnographic and geographical frontiers', while Debar was to be decided with a plebiscite. In 1922, Protogerov projected the creation of an autonomous Macedonia, with Thessalonica as capital, as part of the Tsardom of Bulgaria. In 1923, the IMRO under him and Aleksandrov assassinated Bulgaria's prime minister, Aleksandar Stamboliyski, after he signed the Treaty of Niš with the Kingdom of Serbs, Croats and Slovenes and undertook the obligation to suppress the military operations of the IMRO carried out from Bulgarian territory.

In 1924, IMRO entered negotiations with the Comintern about collaboration between the communists and the Macedonian movement and the creation of a united Macedonian movement. In 1924, in Vienna, he signed the May Manifesto along with Aleksandrov and Chaulev, declaring IMRO's fight for an independent Macedonia in an alliance with the communists. Later, Protogerov denied through the Bulgarian press that they had ever signed any agreements, claiming that the May Manifesto was a communist forgery. Shortly after, Aleksandrov was assassinated in unclear circumstances and IMRO came under the leadership of Ivan Mihailov. In 1925 Protogerov was injured in the St Nedelya Church assault organized by the communists.

IMRO was split between Protogerov's wing, supported by Aleksandar Tsankov, and Mihailov's wing, supported by Andrey Lyapchev. The faction led by Protogerov opted for continuing with the tactics of guerrilla warfare, while that led by Mihailov insisted on individual terrorist attacks. Protogerov was assassinated under Mihailov's orders on 7 July 1928. After his death, Mihailov became the sole leader of IMRO.

== Military awards ==
- Soldier's Cross of Bravery III grade, Bulgaria
- Military Order of Bravery III grade, Bulgaria
- Royal Order of St. Alexander III grade with swords in the middle, Bulgaria
- People's Order of Military Merit III grade on military ribbon, Bulgaria

== Legacy ==
After his death, a faction consisting of his supporters (known as Protogerovists) emerged in the IMRO. They were involved in an internecine struggle with Mihailovists from 1928 to 1934, after which they merged with Zveno and joined the communist Fatherland Front during World War II. The Macedonian historiography in the Yugoslav era regarded Protogerov as part of a group of "bulgarized renegades of the Macedonian revolutionary and liberation movement". He is considered as an ethnic Macedonian in North Macedonia.

== Sources ==
- Вазов, В., Животописни бележки, София, 1992, Военноиздателски комплекс „Св. Георги Победоносец“, ISBN 954-509-002-2, с.123
