= Stamboliyski (village) =

- Village
- Location in Bulgaria
- Coordinates: 41°54′30″N 25°38′00″E
- Country: Bulgaria
- Province: Haskovo Province
- Municipality: Haskovo

Population (2007)
  - Total: 12,015
- Time zone: UTC+2 (EET)
  - Summer (DST): UTC+3 (EEST)

Stamboliyski is a village in the municipality of Haskovo, in Haskovo Province, in southern Bulgaria.
