= Rayko Daskalov =

Bulgarian politician (1886–1923)

Rayko Ivanov Daskalov
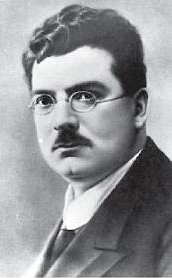
- Born: 21 December [O.S. 9 December] 1886; Byala Cherkva, Principality of Bulgaria
- Died: 23 August 1923 (aged 36); Prague, Czechoslovakia
- Occupation: politician
- Spouse: Nevena

Rayko Ivanov Daskalov (Bulgarian: Райко Иванов Даскалов) (21 December [O.S. 9 December] 1886 – 26 August 1923) was a Bulgarian interwar politician of the Bulgarian Agrarian National Union (BANU). He led the republican Radomir Rebellion organised by deserted Bulgarian Army troops in 1918 against the government. From 1919 to 1923 Daskalov was a prominent member of the BAPU governments which were in power in Bulgaria in the early post-World War I period.

A staunch opponent of the Internal Macedonian Revolutionary Organisation (IMRO), Daskalov survived an assassination attempt orchestrated by the organisation before he was assassinated in another IMRO attempt while residing in Prague, Czechoslovakia.

== Early years and Radomir Rebellion ==
Rayko Daskalov was born in the village of Byala Cherkva (today a small town), located near Veliko Tarnovo in the central north of the Principality of Bulgaria. He finished the High School of Commerce in Svishtov and in 1907 left for Berlin, the capital of the German Empire. There, he successfully defended a doctorate in finance or economics at the Humboldt University in 1911.

Influenced by early agrarian leader and his fellow-villager Tsanko Tserkovski, Daskalov had become a BAPU supporter as a youth. He joined the party in 1911 and by 1914 he had established himself as one of its more active figures. Daskalov fought as a volunteer in the ranks of the Bulgarian Army during the Balkan Wars of 1912–1913, and his brother Petko died on the front. In 1915, Daskalov and other BAPU members were sentenced to jail for their alleged involvement in the Declusiere Affair, a British–French attempt to force Bulgaria into the Entente of World War I. In prison, Daskalov met Georgi Dimitrov and befriended agrarian leader and future Prime Minister Aleksandar Stamboliyski.

After Entente forces had breached Bulgaria's defensive line at Dobro Pole on 18 September 1918, the retreating and deserting Bulgarian troops organised an uprising (known as the Radomir Rebellion) against the current government and Tsar Ferdinand of Bulgaria. The rebelling soldiers reached Kyustendil and Radomir and threatened the capital Sofia. In an attempt to stop the uprising, Daskalov and Stamboliyski were promptly released from captivity and envoyed to the insurgents. It was hoped that due to their popularity, the agrarian leaders would be able to persuade the insurgents into obedience.

Instead of attempting to peacefully end the uprising, Daskalov, soon supported by Stamboliyski, put himself in charge of the rebelling troops. On 27 September, he proclaimed that the monarchist government of Bulgaria was to be overthrown and established the so-called Radomir Republic, with Stamboliyski as its president and himself as commander-in-chief. However, the government managed to rally loyalist troops and quickly crushed the uprising. The end of the rebellion was signalled by the capture of Radomir on 2 October, only five days after Daskalov's proclamation. Severely wounded in the arm in the skirmishes, Daskalov managed to escape to Thessaloniki, Greece by surrendering to the advancing Entente forces. As Bulgaria's involvement in the war ended soon thereafter in an armistice, he was pardoned and allowed to return to the country.

== In office and assassination ==
After BAPU won the 1919 elections, Rayko Daskalov was a permanent presence in the party's governments from October 1919 to February 1923, with Stamboliyski as Prime Minister. As a prominent member of the BAPU cabinet, Daskalov was behind several of the government's major reforms, including the large-scale land reform and the introduction of the controversial mandatory labour service. He also suggested the establishment of BAPU's paramilitary force, the Orange Guard, which he personally commanded. Daskalov was successively in charge of several ministries during BAPU's time in power: the Ministry of Agriculture and State Properties (1919–1920), the Ministry of Finance (interim, 1920), the Ministry of Commerce, Industry and Labour (1920–1922) and the Ministry of Internal Affairs and National Health (1922–1923). He was also elected to parliament for three consecutive National Assembly terms, from 1919 to 1923.

Politically, Daskalov belonged to the radical leftist wing of BAPU. He was a major opponent of the Internal Macedonian Revolutionary Organisation (IMRO), an autonomist organisation in the region of Macedonia which took a stand against the terms of the Treaty of Neuilly that imposed Yugoslav and Greek rule over most of the region. In 1922–1923, Daskalov was at the helm of major repressions against IMRO's activity in Pirin Macedonia, the northeastern part of the region allotted by the treaty to Bulgaria. On 15 December 1922, he was targeted by an IMRO-organised assassination attempt in Sofia. IMRO member (komitadji) Asen Daskalov threw a bomb at Rayko Daskalov's car in front of the National Assembly building in Sofia, though the politician was not injured.

In February 1923, Daskalov was released from his duties as government minister and in May he was sent to Prague, the capital of Czechoslovakia, as Bulgarian minister plenipotentiary to that country. On 9 June, with Daskalov in Prague, a military-supported coup d'état overthrew Stamboliyski and put in charge a Democratic Alliance government under right-wing politician Aleksandar Tsankov. Daskalov attempted to gather international support for the overthrown government and even founded a BAPU government in exile, though his efforts were of little practical effect.

On 26 August 1923, Daskalov was fatally shot on Holeček Street in the Smíchov district of Prague by another IMRO associate, Yordan Tsitsonkov, under orders from IMRO leader Todor Aleksandrov. The assassin was arrested and shortly thereafter released, after the jury found him not guilty. Tsitsonkov's attorney was the known Czech nationalist Jan Renner. Tsitsonkov was retried in October 1924 and sentenced to 20 years in jail under Yugoslav pressure. Tsitsonkov was initially imprisoned in the Tábor prison but was moved to the prison in Kartouzy after a rumour spread that he was planning to escape. He committed suicide there by hanging in January 1926.

== Personal life and commemoration ==
On 9 February 1919, Rayko Daskalov married Nevena, an agrarian sympathiser from an affluent Sofia family. Aleksandar Stamboliyski was his best man at the wedding. The couple had two children, Stefan and Svetla. The daughter, Svetla Daskalova, would follow in her father's footsteps as a BAPU politician and would become a long-time Minister of Justice (1966–1990) during the communist rule of Bulgaria.

Daskalov was initially interred in Prague's Olšany Cemetery; his burial ceremony was booed by anti-agrarian Bulgarian students in the city. In 1946, his remains were transferred back to Bulgaria and he was reburied in the Borisova Gradina in Sofia. A bilingual Czech–Bulgarian commemorative plaque in Smíchov, Prague, marks the site of Daskalov's assassination; the plaque describes Daskalov as a "great Slav and a fighter for freedom, democracy and republicanism".

A two-storey house in the town centre of Byala Cherkva, built in 1922 in the yard of the politician's native house, was converted into a museum dedicated to Rayko Daskalov in 1984. The four rooms of the Rayko Daskalov Museum House exhibit documents and items related to the life of the politician. There is also a bust of Daskalov in his native place, sculpted by Veliko Tarnovo artist Orfey Mindov.
