= Teodor Teodorov =

Bulgarian politician (1859–1924)

Teodor Teodorov Теодор Теодоров
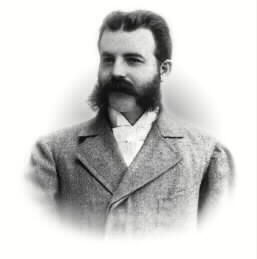

19th Prime Minister of Bulgaria
- In office 28 November 1918 – 6 October 1919
- Monarch: Boris III
- Preceded by: Aleksandar Malinov
- Succeeded by: Aleksandar Stamboliyski

Personal details
- Born: 8 April 1859 Elena, Ottoman Empire
- Died: 5 August 1924 (aged 65) Chamkoria, Bulgaria
- Party: People's Party

Teodor Ivanov Teodorov (Bulgarian: Теодор Теодоров; 8 April 1859, Elena – 5 August 1924) was a leading Bulgarian politician and legal expert who served as Prime Minister of Bulgaria immediately after the First World War.

He was Minister of Finance from 1897 to 1899 and from 1911 to 1913.

Teodorov first came to prominence through his support for reform of the Bulgarian legal system and took part in a Commission set up in 1911 that eventually produced the Administrative Justice Law that established a Supreme Court.

He was called in to head a coalition government after the resignation of Aleksandar Malinov on 28 November 1918 and struggled to keep order in the defeated country. Initially an opponent of Aleksandar Stamboliyski, he was later forced to admit the Agrarian Peoples Union leader into the Cabinet and was ultimately succeeded as prime minister by him. Teodorov was to play no further role in Bulgarian politics.

== Notes ==
Political offices
Preceded by Aleksandar Malinov	Prime Minister of Bulgaria; 1918–1919	Succeeded by Aleksandar Stamboliyski
Preceded by Aleksandar Malinov	Minister of Foreign Affairs of Bulgaria; 1918–1919	Succeeded by Mihail Madzharov
