= List of companies of Bulgaria =

Location of Bulgaria

This is a list of notable companies that were founded in Bulgaria, are headquartered in Bulgaria, or operate in Bulgaria as major subsidiaries of foreign groups. It includes Bulgarian-origin private and state-owned enterprises, former companies of historical importance, and large foreign-owned companies with substantial operations in the Bulgarian market. The companies listed below cover major parts of the Bulgarian economy, including energy, metals, defence manufacturing, banking, telecommunications, food and beverage production, software, transport, retail, publishing and tourism.

Bulgaria's largest companies by revenue are concentrated in fuels, energy, metals, utilities, retail and industrial production. Recent business rankings have identified companies such as LUKOIL Neftochim Burgas, Aurubis Bulgaria, LUKOIL Bulgaria, Axpo Bulgaria, BA Glass Bulgaria, Lidl Bulgaria, Kaufland Bulgaria, Astra Bioplant and Kozloduy Nuclear Power Plant among the largest companies operating in the country. International rankings such as the Coface CEE Top 500 rank companies by turnover and exclude financial service providers such as banks and insurers, so major Bulgarian banks are included separately in the tables below where they are notable for the Bulgarian market.

For further information on the types of business entities in Bulgaria and their abbreviations, see "Business entities in Bulgaria".

== Notable firms ==
The tables below separate companies of Bulgarian origin from foreign-owned companies operating in Bulgaria. The industry and sector categories broadly follow the Industry Classification Benchmark taxonomy. Companies that have ceased operations are included where they are historically notable and are marked as defunct.

=== Bulgarian-origin companies ===
Name	Industry	Sector	Headquarters	Founded	Notes
Air VIA	Consumer services	Airlines	Sofia	1990	Charter airline; defunct
Ariana Brewery	Consumer goods	Brewers	Sofia	1884	Brewery; defunct 2004
Armimex	Industrials	Defense	Sofia	1992	Arms and weaponry export; defunct 2003
Arsenal AD	Industrials	Defense	Kazanlak	1878	Military equipment manufacturer and one of Bulgaria's largest industrial employers
Asarel Medet	Basic materials	Nonferrous metals	Panagyurishte	1964	Copper extraction and processing
Astra Bioplant	Consumer goods	Food products	Slivo Pole Municipality	2009	Producer of biodiesel, vegetable oils and related products; among the largest Bulgarian-origin companies by sales
Astika Brewery	Consumer goods	Brewers	Pazardzhik	1980	Brewery
Balkanstroy	Industrials	Construction & materials	Sofia	1994	Engineering and construction
Balkantourist	Consumer services	Travel & tourism	Sofia	1948	Travel services
Balkanton	Consumer services	Record label	Sofia	1952	Record label
BH Air	Consumer services	Airlines	Sofia	2001	Passenger air transport
Bulgaria Air	Consumer services	Airlines	Sofia	2002	National airline; passenger and freight air transport
Bulgarian Air Charter	Consumer services	Airlines	Sofia	2000	Charter airline
Bulgarian Agricultural and Commercial Bank	Financials	Banks	Sofia	1969	Former state bank; rejoined the central bank in 1971
Bulgarian Development Bank	Financials	Banks	Sofia	1999	State-owned development and commercial bank
Bulgarian Energy Holding	Utilities	Electricity and gas	Sofia	2008	State-owned energy holding active through subsidiaries in electricity generation, transmission, gas supply, gas transmission, gas storage and coal mining
Bulgarian National Bank	Financials	Banks	Sofia	1879	Central bank of Bulgaria
Bulgarian Posts	Industrials	Delivery services	Sofia	1879	Postal and courier services
Bulgarian State Railways	Industrials	Railroads	Sofia	1885	State-owned passenger and freight rail transport
Bulgargaz	Utilities	Gas utilities	Sofia	1973	State-owned public supplier of natural gas; part of Bulgarian Energy Holding
Bulgartabac	Consumer goods	Tobacco	Sofia	1947	Tobacco holding company
Cargoair	Industrials	Delivery services	Sofia	2007	Cargo airline
Central Cooperative Bank	Financials	Banks	Sofia	1991	Universal commercial bank
Centralna energoremontna baza	Utilities	Conventional electricity	Sofia	1948	Maintenance of large electric power facilities
Chimimport	Conglomerates	—	Sofia	1947	Holding company with activities in chemicals, oil and gas, transport and financial services
Corecom	Consumer services	Specialty retailers	Sofia	1960	Hard-currency retail chain; defunct
Dafna Group	Consumer goods	Tobacco	Sofia	1990s	Tobacco products and trading; listed among Bulgaria's largest companies by revenue in recent business rankings
Economedia	Consumer services	Publishing	Sofia	1993	Media and publishing
Era	Consumer services	Publishing	Sofia	1996	Publisher
Eurofootball	Consumer services	Gambling	Sofia	1990	Sports betting and bookmaking
Eurohold Bulgaria	Financials	Specialty finance	Sofia	1996	Holding company with activities in energy, insurance and financial services
Fantastico	Consumer services	Food retailers & wholesalers	Sofia	1991	Supermarket chain
First Investment Bank	Financials	Banks	Sofia	1993	Banking
Girdap	Financials	Banks	Ruse	1881	Private bank; defunct 1925
Haemimont Games	Technology	Software	Sofia	1997	Video and computer game development
Heli Air Services	Consumer services	Airlines	Sofia	1990	Charter airline
Hotel Rodina	Consumer services	Hotels	Sofia	1979	Hotel
Kintex	Industrials	Defense	Sofia	1966	State-owned arms and weaponry exporter
Kozloduy Nuclear Power Plant	Utilities	Nuclear electricity	Kozloduy	1974	Nuclear power generation; one of Bulgaria's largest companies by sales
Kremikovtzi AD	Basic materials	Iron & steel	Sofia	1963	Metal and steelworks; defunct
Martankship	Industrials	Marine transportation	Burgas	2005	Shipping and petroleum-product logistics; among Bulgaria's largest companies by sales
Maxeurope	Consumer goods	Recreational products	Plovdiv	1996	Bicycles
Microinvest	Technology	Software	Sofia	1984	Commercial and accounting software
Multigroup	Conglomerates	—	Sofia	1989	Former conglomerate active in trade, industry, tourism and financial services; defunct
Navibulgar	Industrials	Marine transportation	Varna	1892	Shipping company
NEK EAD	Utilities	Conventional electricity	Sofia	1991	Electricity generation, supply and trading; part of Bulgarian Energy Holding
Nimero	Technology	Software	Sofia	2009	Information technology
Ontotext	Technology	Software	Sofia	2000	Semantic technology and software development
Overgas	Utilities	Gas utilities	Sofia	1991	Natural gas distribution and supply
Petrol AD	Oil & gas	Fuel distribution	Sofia	1932	Oil and fuel distribution
Prosveta Publishing House	Consumer services	Publishing	Sofia	1945	Publishing
Saksa	Oil & gas	Fuel trading	Stara Zagora	1990s	Fuel and energy product trading; among Bulgaria's largest companies by sales
Sopharma	Health care	Pharmaceuticals	Sofia	1933	Pharmaceutical manufacturing and distribution
Sucreries Raffineries Bulgares	Consumer goods	Food products	Sofia	1897	Sugar refinery; defunct 1916
Technomarket	Consumer services	Consumer electronics	Sofia	1992	Consumer electronics retail
TEREM	Industrials	Defense	Sofia	1963	State-owned arms and military equipment repair and manufacture
Texim Bank	Financials	Banks	Sofia	1992	Private bank
Varna shipyard	Industrials	Shipbuilding	Varna	1907	Shipyard
Vivacom	Telecommunications	Fixed line telecommunications	Sofia	1992	Telecommunications operator originally established from the Bulgarian Telecommunications Company; now foreign-owned
Vitta Foods	Consumer goods	Food products	Svilengrad	2006	Frozen food and pastries
VRZ Karlovo	Industrials	Commercial vehicles & trucks	Karlovo	1964	Railway cars and equipment

=== Foreign-owned companies operating in Bulgaria ===
Name	Foreign parent or origin	Industry	Sector	Headquarters in Bulgaria	Founded or entered Bulgaria	Notes
Aurubis Bulgaria	Aurubis AG; Germany	Basic materials	Nonferrous metals	Pirdop	1958	Copper smelting and processing; produces copper anodes, copper cathodes, sulfuric acid and iron silicate; formerly Cumerio Med
Axpo Bulgaria	Axpo; Switzerland	Utilities	Energy trading	Sofia	2006	Regional gas and power trading hub operating in Central and Eastern European markets
BA Glass Bulgaria	BA Glass; Portugal	Industrials	Containers & packaging	Sofia	2017	Glass packaging production for the food and beverage industries; operates Bulgarian plants in Sofia and Plovdiv
Billa Bulgaria	REWE Group; Austria/Germany	Consumer services	Food retailers & wholesalers	Sofia	2000	Supermarket chain and major Bulgarian employer
Blizoo	A1 Telekom Austria Group; Austria	Telecommunications	Fixed line telecommunications	Sofia	2010	Cable operator; later integrated into A1 Bulgaria
Bulgarian Postbank	Eurobank; Greece	Financials	Banks	Sofia	1991	Universal bank operating under the Postbank brand
Carlsberg Bulgaria	Carlsberg Group; Denmark	Consumer goods	Brewers	Shumen	2002	Brewery group operating beer brands in Bulgaria
Diema	United Group; Netherlands/Serbia	Consumer services	Broadcasting & entertainment	Sofia	1999	Television channel group; part of Nova Broadcasting Group
DSK Bank	OTP Bank; Hungary	Financials	Banks	Sofia	1951	Retail and corporate bank; part of OTP Group
DZI	KBC Group; Belgium	Financials	Insurance	Sofia	1946	Insurance company; part of KBC Group
Egmont Bulgaria	Egmont Group; Denmark	Consumer services	Publishing	Sofia	1991	Publisher
HVB Bank Biochim	UniCredit Group; Italy	Financials	Banks	Sofia	1986	Bank; merged into UniCredit Bulbank; defunct 2007
Kamenitza	Molson Coors; United States/Canada	Consumer goods	Brewers	Plovdiv	1881	Brewery
Kaufland Bulgaria	Schwarz Gruppe; Germany	Consumer services	Food retailers & wholesalers	Sofia	2006	Hypermarket chain and one of Bulgaria's largest private employers
Kino Nova	United Group; Netherlands/Serbia	Consumer services	Broadcasting & entertainment	Sofia	2011	Movie television channel; part of Nova Broadcasting Group
Lidl Bulgaria	Schwarz Gruppe; Germany	Consumer services	Food retailers & wholesalers	Sofia	2010	Discount supermarket chain; part of Germany's Schwarz Group
LUKOIL Bulgaria	Lukoil; Russia	Oil & gas	Fuel distribution	Sofia	1998	Fuel retail and wholesale; operates a large service-station network in Bulgaria
LUKOIL Neftochim Burgas	Lukoil; Russia	Oil & gas	Refining & petrochemicals	Burgas	1961	Oil refinery and petrochemical producer; among the largest companies in Bulgaria by revenue
MKB Unionbank	BayernLB; Germany	Financials	Banks	Sofia	1991	Retail and commercial bank; later acquired and merged
A1 Bulgaria	A1 Telekom Austria Group; Austria	Telecommunications	Mobile telecommunications	Sofia	1994	Mobile, fixed-line, internet and television services; formerly Mtel and Mobiltel
Pirinsko Pivo	Carlsberg Group; Denmark	Consumer goods	Brewers	Blagoevgrad	1969	Brewery brand operated by Carlsberg Bulgaria
Raiffeisenbank Bulgaria	Raiffeisen Bank International; Austria	Financials	Banks	Sofia	1994	Universal bank; acquired by KBC Group and merged into United Bulgarian Bank
Yettel Bulgaria	e& PPF Telecom Group; United Arab Emirates/Czech Republic	Telecommunications	Mobile telecommunications	Sofia	2001	Mobile and fixed telecommunications operator; operated as Telenor Bulgaria until March 2022
UniCredit Bulbank	UniCredit Group; Italy	Financials	Banks	Sofia	1964	Bank and financial services
United Bulgarian Bank	KBC Group; Belgium	Financials	Banks	Sofia	1992	Commercial bank; one of Bulgaria's largest banks and employers

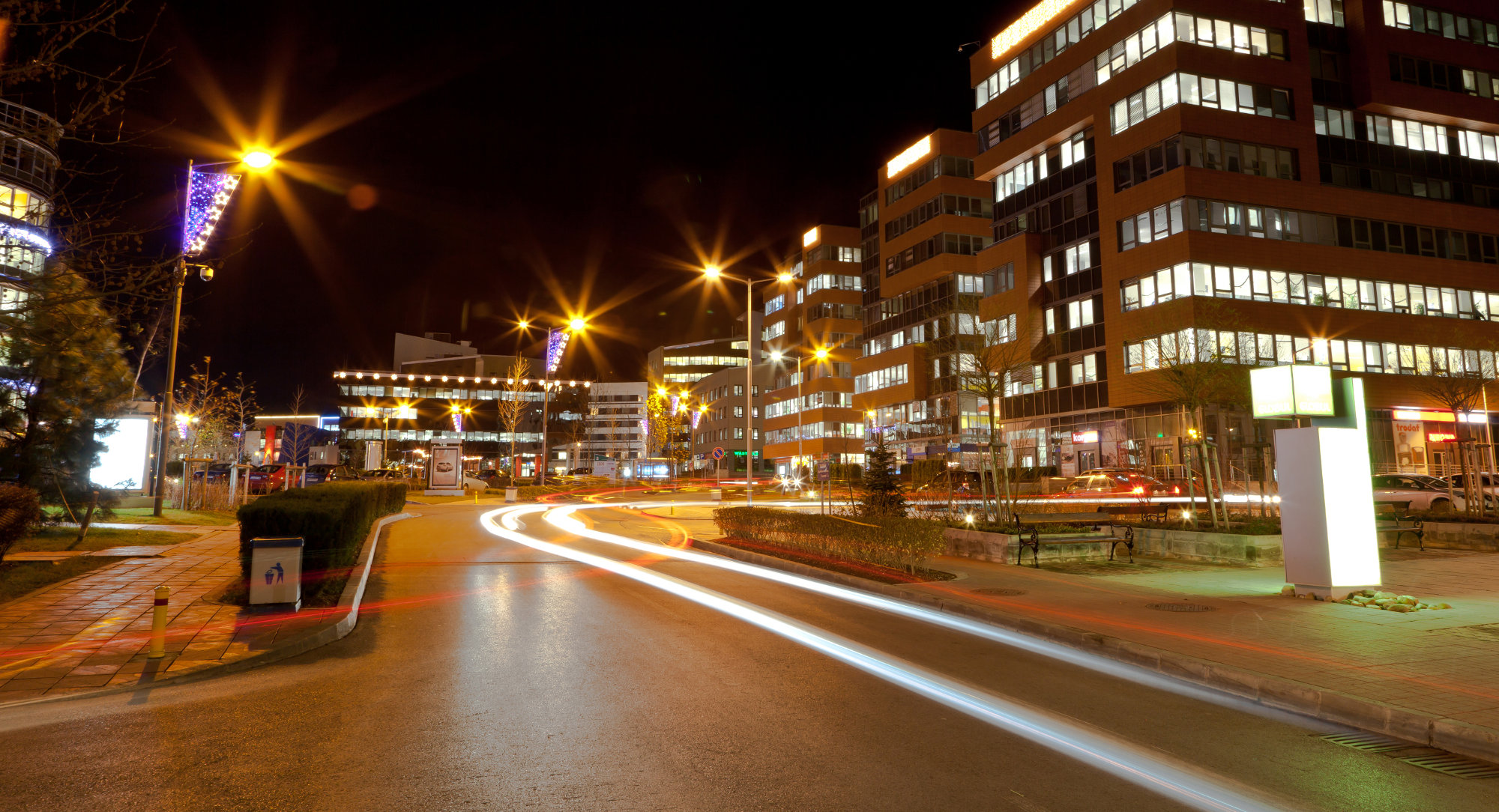
Business park in Sofia

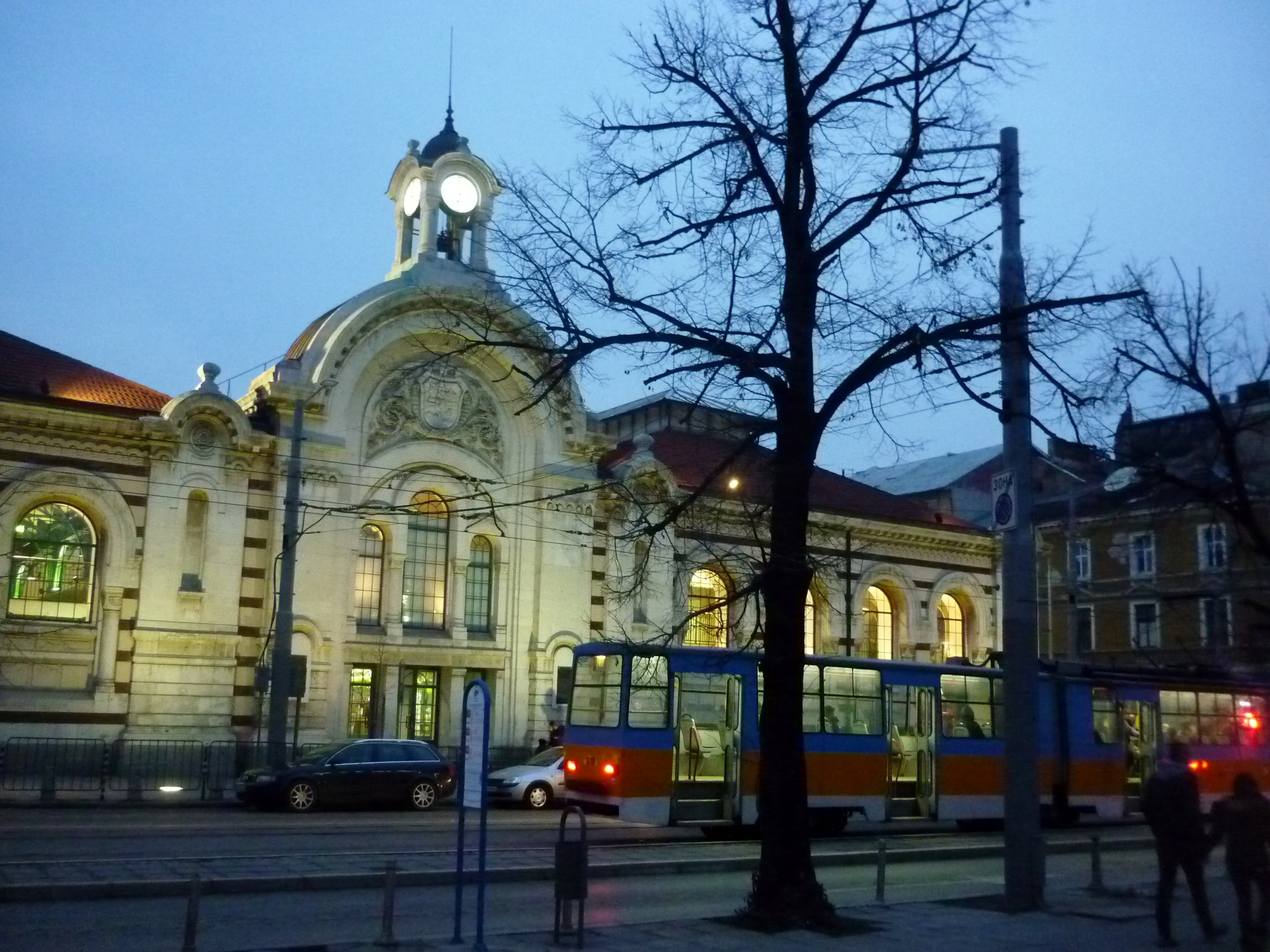
Central Sofia Market Hall

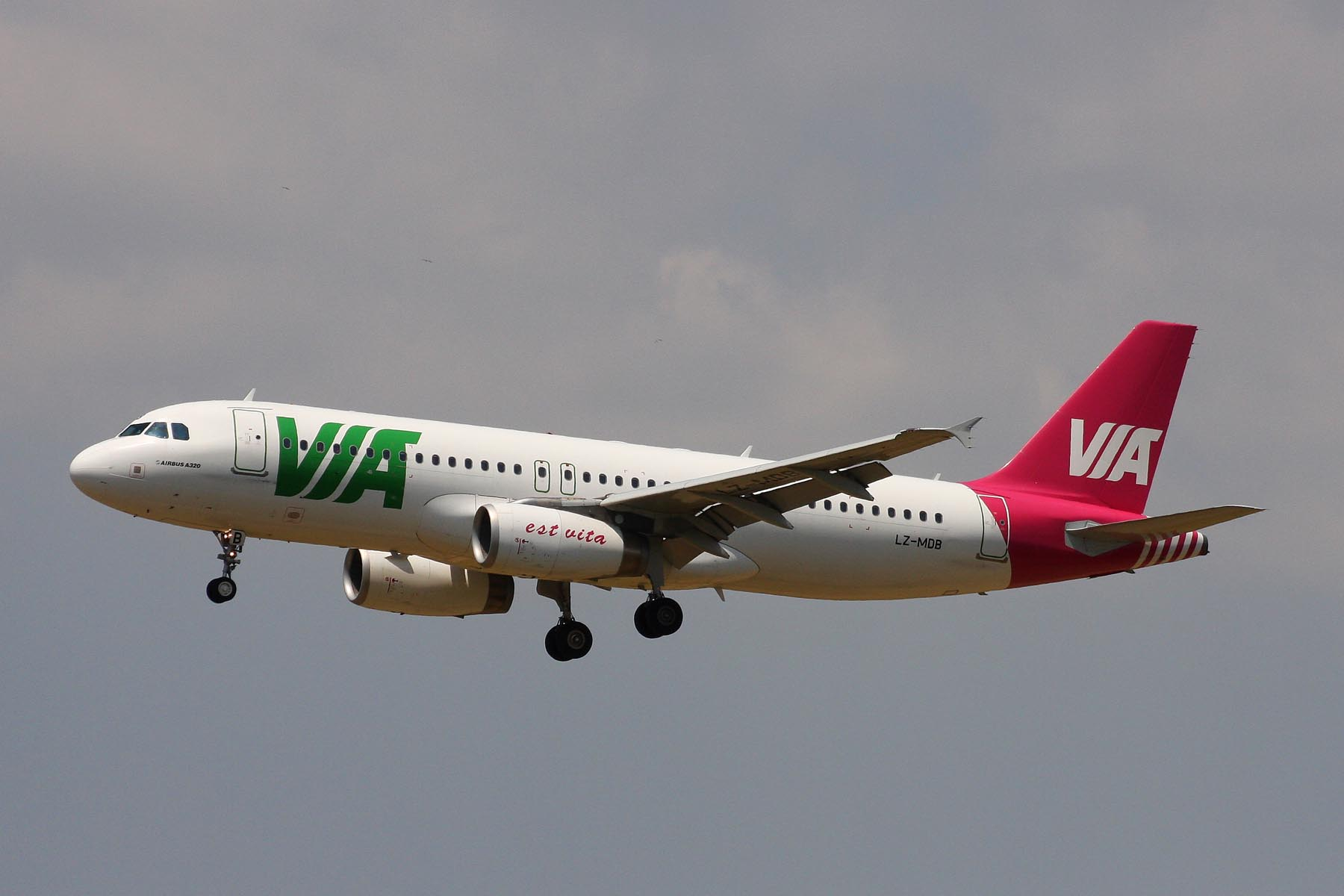
Air VIA Airbus A320-200

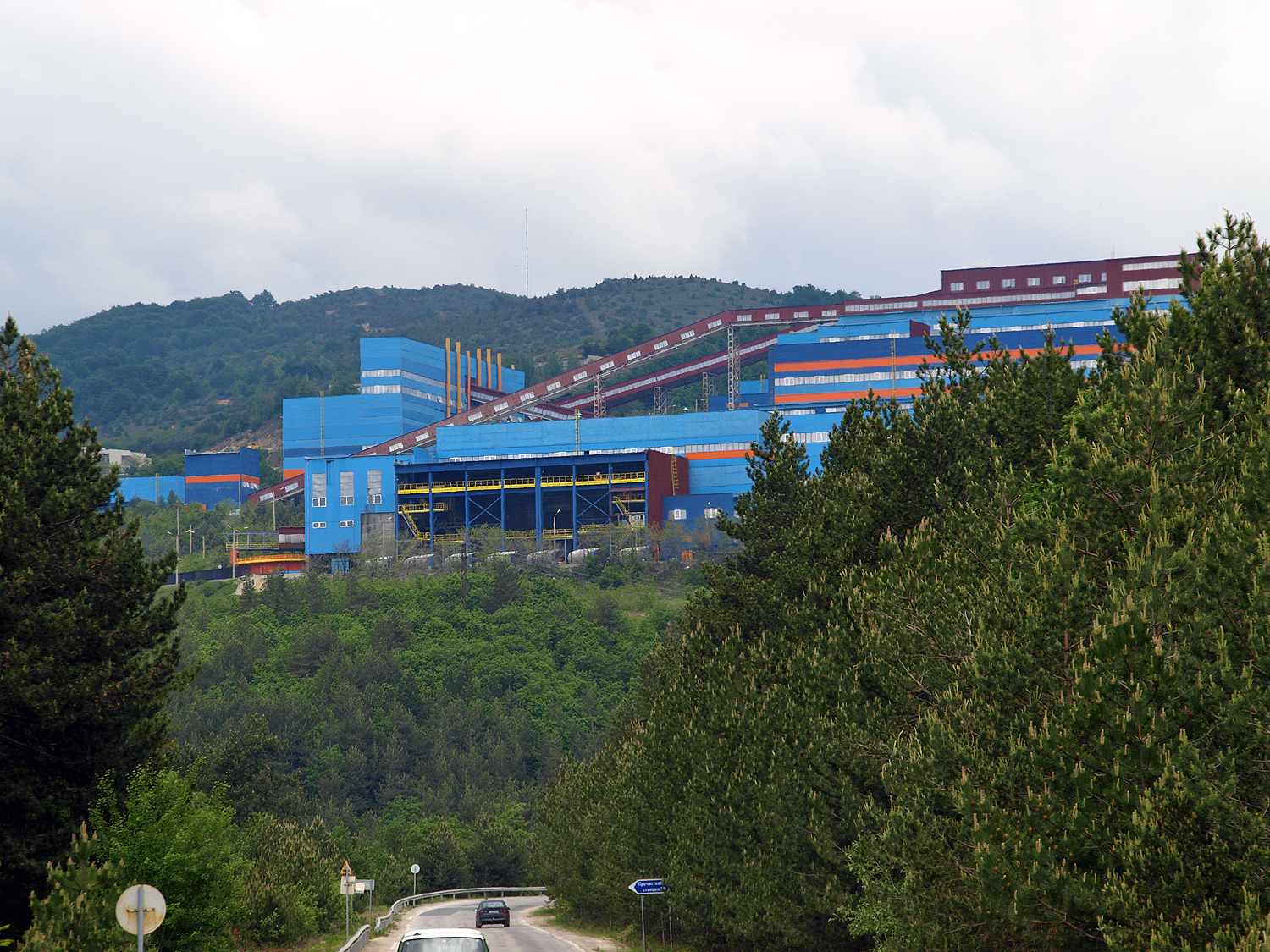
Partial view of Asarel Medet copper mine

== See also ==
- Economy of Bulgaria
- List of banks in Bulgaria
