= Defense industry of Bulgaria =

Bulgaria is a NATO member country with a large indigenous defence industry. Most of its weaponry is of Soviet design, but with significantly improved performance. Bulgaria is ranked as a "medium" small arms exporter according to the Small Arms Survey.

== History ==
Despite having local arms factories, until 1944 Bulgaria relied mostly on imports to equip its military. Nevertheless, the Bulgarian defence industry was capable of producing training and light attack aircraft, such as the DAR-10 and Laz-7. After the installment of a Communist government the same year, the country started a process of massive industrialization, but continued to import equipment. By the 1980s a large part of the equipment came from local suppliers. In the late 1980s exports reached about $800 mln. annually, trade partners being mostly Egypt, Algeria, Angola, North Korea, Libya, Syria, Iraq, Cuba and Vietnam.

After the loss of Warsaw Pact and secondary markets, surplus weapons, as well as newly manufactured items, were illicitly exported to a variety of countries and rebel groups across Africa and Asia.

== Manufacturers ==
- Arsenal AD – oldest weapons manufacturer (est. 1878), largest machine-building company in the country; produces pistols, sub-machine guns, assault rifles, light machine guns, machine guns, grenade launchers, mortars, air-defense systems, anti-tank grenade launchers, automatic grenade launchers, ammunition for small arms, artillery rounds, bombs, anti-tank weapons ammunition, unguided rockets and others;
- TEREM – Government owned specializing in servicing equipment and producing ammunition and spares;
- VMZ Sopot – Government owned produces anti-tank guided and unguided missiles, aviation unguided missiles and artillery ammunition;
- Kintex – Government owned produces ammunition, bombs, unguided rockets, fuses, mines and communication equipment;
- Samel 90 – communication equipment, MRAPs, Infantry fighting vehicles surface-to-air missiles and others;
- Dunarit AD - explosives, munitions and rockets.
- Armstechno – drones and UAVs;
- THOR Global Defense Group – Small Arms and Long Range Systems – Franchise Office;
- Apolo GmbH – uniforms;
- State military technology institute
- MARS Armor Ltd. – body armor and personal ballistic protection solutions.
- Armaco JSC
- Optix-Thermal and night vision devices and optics.
- Bulcomersks.

== Products ==
=== Small arms ===
- AR series – AR-M1 assault rifle and others. The basic AR-M1 is chambered in 5.56x45mm, has a 600 rpm rate of fire, 900 m/s muzzle velocity, nearly 600 g lighter than the original AK-74 (loaded weight), somewhat more durable, a rail for an optical or reflex sights.
- AKS-74u assault rifle
- Arsenal Shipka submachine gun
- LMG light machine gun
- MG-M1 general purpose machine gun
- Arcus 98DA pistol
- Makarov PM pistol

=== Artillery ===
- Mortars – 60–120 mm
- 2S12 Tundzha SP mortars (two variants – 82 and 120 mm)
- 2S1 Karamfil SP howitzers

=== Air defence equipment ===
- SA-7B Grail MANPADS
- SA-14 Gremlin MANPADS
- SA-16 Gimlet MANPADS
- SA-18 Grouse MANPADS

=== Anti-tank weapons ===
- SPG-9DNM recoilless rifle
- RPG-7 grenade launcher
- RPG-22 one-shot disposable rocket launcher (issued as a round of ammunition)
- AT-3 Sagger ATGM
- AT-4 Spigot ATGM
- AT-5 Spandrel ATGM

=== Armored vehicles ===
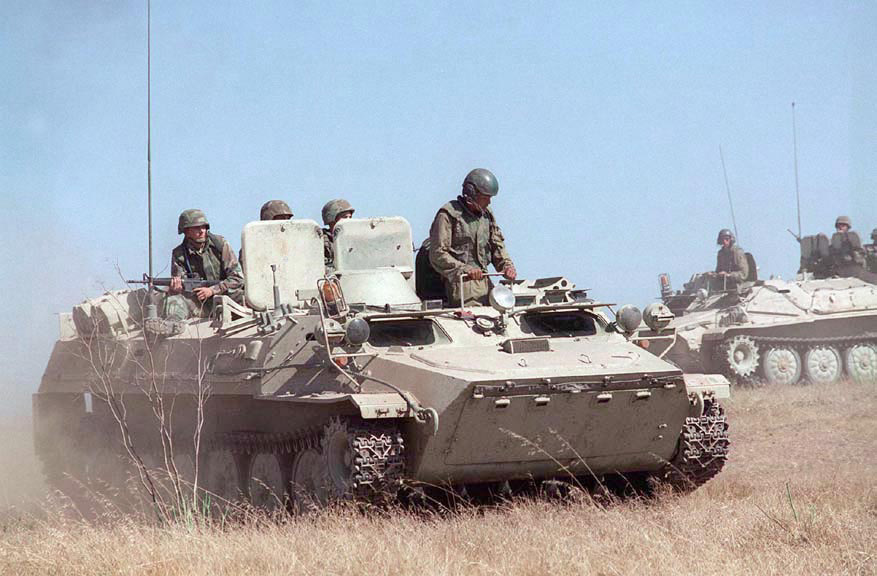
A Bulgarian-made MT-LB used by the USMC

- MT-LB in different versions
- BMP-23
- BTR-60:
- BTR-60PAU – Artillery command variant of the BTR-60PA with 4 whip antennas.
- BTR-60PB with Polish WAT turret from SKOT-2AP. Only a prototype was made.
- BTR-60PB-MD (bronyetransport’or moderniziran) – BTR-60PB upgraded with VAMO DT3900 or Rover TD-200 diesel engine, four MB smoke grenade dischargers on the turret (two on each side), "Melopa" night sight, new day sight, new NBC protection system and modern radios. It also has a rear view mirror on the left hand side of the hull. Only a prototype was made.
  - BTR-60PB-MD1 – Version for the Bulgarian army, powered by a Cummins ISB 25.30 turbocharged Euro 3 diesel engine of 250 hp and fitted with side hatches. About 150 in service.
  - BTR-60PB-MD3 – export model, fitted with a KamAZ diesel engine, different sights and eight additional smoke grenade launchers in the front right corner of the hull. The prototype, shown in 2004, was based on a BTR-60PA.

=== Missiles and rockets ===
- Rockets for BM-21
- S-5 rocket

=== Ammunition ===
- Starshel ECM round
- RPG rounds
- 5.45, 5.56, 7.62, 9, 12.7, 14.5, 23, 40, 57, 60, 73, 81, 82, 100, 120, 122, 125, 130, 152 mm ammunition

=== Other ===
- Armstechno NITI drone
- Armstechno Dulo UCAV
- jammers for remotely detonated bombs
- UBGL-1 underbarrel grenade launcher in different variants
- handheld radios
- guidance systems for missiles
- avionics for aircraft
- uniforms and helmets
- optical instruments
- night vision equipment
- body armor and bulletproof vests

== Customers ==
- Afghanistan
- Algeria
- Angola
- Chad
- Chile
- Canada
- China
- Republic of the Congo
- Eritrea
- Ethiopia
- Finland
- Georgia
- Greece
- Guinea
- India
- Iraq
- Jordan
- Lebanon
- North Macedonia
- Mauritania
- Mali
- Nepal
- Poland
- Rwanda
- Sweden
- Turkey
- United Arab Emirates
- United States
- Vietnam
- Yemen
