= Khan Asparukh (ship) =

Bulgarian tanker

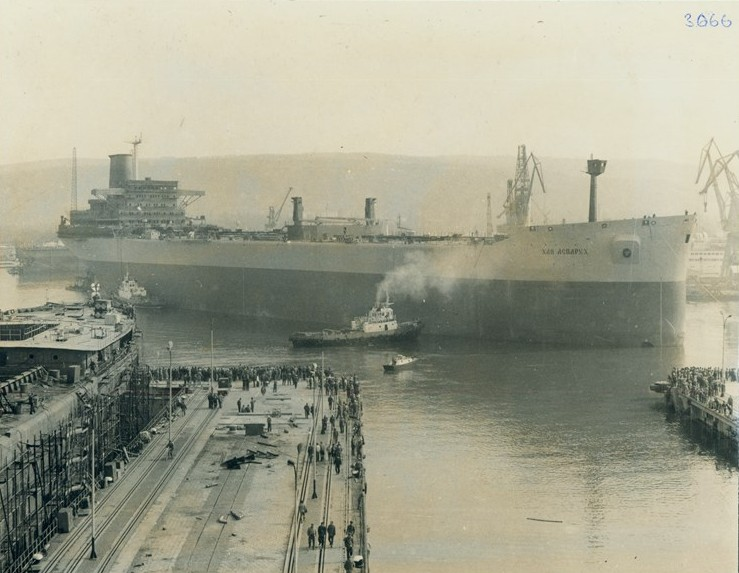
- Khan Asparukh in Varna shipyard

History
- Name: Khan Asparukh
- Owner: Navibulgar
- Operator: Navibulgar
- Port of registry: Bulgaria, Varna
- Builder: Varna shipyard
- Laid down: May 2003
- Launched: 27 March 1976
- Fate: Scrapped December 2003

General characteristics
- Type: Tanker
- Tonnage: 100,000 GT; 111,896 NT; 318,000 DWT
- Length: 244 m (800 ft 6 in)
- Beam: 39 m (127 ft 11 in)
- Draught: 15.5 m (50 ft 10 in)

Khan Asparukh was the largest Bulgarian tanker owned and operated by Navibulgar.

The ship had a length overall of 224 metres (734 ft 11 in) and a draft of 15.5 metres (50 ft 10 in). The tanker used a 8RND-90 Sulzer Cegielski engine with 17,300 kilowatts (23,200 hp). She a 100,000-tonne capacity. The ship began construction in 1974 in Varna shipyard. It was built according to a project of the Shipbuilding Institute in the city of Varna with the chief designer engineer Tasho Popov. The first 100,000-tonne tanker built in Bulgaria was launched on March 24, 1976. The first captain and chief mechanic, respectively: Vidyo Videv and Peter Tsaperkov.

The tanker was a part of the Navibulgar until December 3, 2003, when it was sold for scrapping in Alang, India.
