= Karlsberg Bulgaria AD =

Brewing company in Bulgaria

Karlsberg Bulgaria is the Bulgarian subsidiary of the Carlsberg Group. Since 2002, it has owned the Shumensko Brewery in the city of Shumen, where it brews mainly Shumensko pivo (Шуменско пиво).

The company brews two Bulgarian brands – Shumensko and Pirinsko, and five licensed brands – Tuborg, Carlsberg, Holsten, Budweiser Budvar, and Somersby cider.
