= Vitta =

Vitta may refer to:

- Estádio Décio Vitta, a multi-use stadium
- Mandello Vitta, a comune (municipality) in the Province of Novara in the Italian region Piedmont
- Vitta Foods
- Vitta (botany), an oil tube found in the fruits of some plants
- Vitta (gastropod) Mörch, 1852, a genus of molluscs of the family Neritidae
- Vitta (cestode) Burt, 1938, a genus of cestodes of the family Dilepididae
- Hasora vitta, a butterfly
- Vittae (Latin plural) may refer to fillets worn by ancient Roman women.
