= Niti =

Niti can refer to:

- Nickel titanium alloy or Nitinol
- Shape memory alloy
- Niti Valley and Niti Pass in the Indian state of Uttarakhand
- NITI, a Bulgarian UAV
- Niti, (Sanskrit: नीति), ethical theories in Hinduism
- NITI Aayog, NITI Aayog (India)

== See also ==
- Neethi (disambiguation)
