= Microinvest =

- Type: Private company
- Industry: Accounting software, POS systems, ERP
- Founded: 1984
- Headquarters: Sofia, Bulgaria
- Products: software
- Website: www.microinvest.net

Microinvest is a Bulgarian software manufacturer of commercial and accounting solutions for small and medium-sized businesses in the restaurant point-of-sale, retail, hospitality, entertainment and other similar industries. Its headquarters is located in Sofia, Bulgaria.

The company was founded in 1984 as the first software developer in Eastern Europe. In the period 1984–1992, the company asserted as a leader in the manufacturing of software for the construction and architecture industry in Bulgaria. In 1985, it was awarded its first gold medal on the International Fair Plovdiv for developing a program product for calculating statistics and dynamics characteristics of architectural constructions. In 1995, Microinvest was transformed from a government-owned to a private-owned enterprise and shifted its focus towards developing commercial and accounting software. Since then, it has won several more awards from the International Fair in Plovdiv. In 1997, it was awarded a gold medal for best intellectually oriented software product in Bulgaria. In 2000, the company was again awarded a gold medal for developing a package of educational programs called “Rainbow”. In the following year, the company won a gold medal for the development of the product “Office in Your Hand”, based on mobile devices with Palm OS. The most recent gold medal of the company was awarded in 2009 for the development of the program “Cybercafé” – an application enabling order-making in restaurants to be performed via a mobile device, without the need of waiters to take orders.

In 2006, Microinvest entered the international market. At the moment, the company is present on 4 continents, having around 300 dealers in 18 countries worldwide.

Microinvest is a member of several major technological organizations in Bulgaria: Bulgarian Association of Software Companies (BASSCOM), Bulgarian Association of the Distributors of Fiscal Devices (BADFU) and Bulgarian - Russian Chamber of Commerce and Industry (BRCCI). The company is also a Microsoft Gold Certified Partner and a SugarCRM Bronze Partner.

In the last 14 years, the company has been undertaking a donation campaign for IT and economics-teaching high schools and state universities. It aims at expanding the learning opportunities and enhancing the education process of students in these fields.
