= Electronic countermeasure =

Electronic device for deceiving detection systems

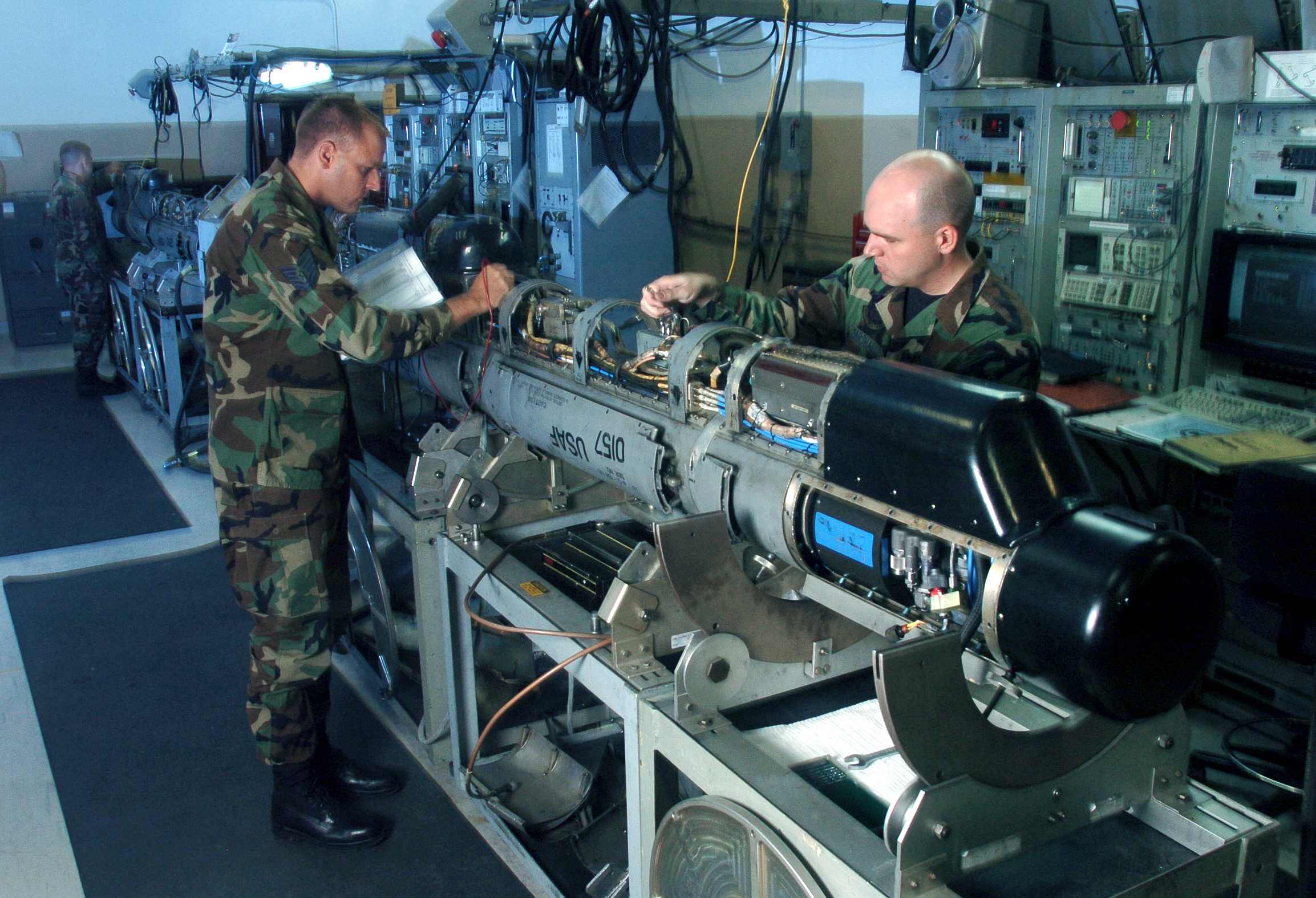
Inspecting an AN/ALQ-184 Electronic Attack Pod.

An electronic countermeasure (ECM) is an electrical or electronic device designed to trick or deceive radar, sonar, or other detection systems, like infrared (IR) or lasers. It may be used offensively and defensively to deny targeting information to an enemy. The system may make many separate targets appear to the enemy, or make the real target appear to disappear or move about randomly. It is used effectively to protect aircraft from guided missiles. Most air forces use ECM to protect their aircraft from attack. It has also been deployed by military ships and recently on some advanced tanks to fool laser/IR guided missiles. It is frequently coupled with stealth advances, so the ECM systems have an easier job. Offensive ECM often takes the form of jamming. Self-protecting (defensive) ECM includes blip enhancement and jamming missile terminal homers.

== History ==
The first example of electronic countermeasures applied in combat occurred during the Russo-Japanese War. On July 13, 1904, Russian wireless telegraphy stations installed in the Port Arthur fortress and on board Russian light cruisers successfully interrupted wireless communication between Japanese battleships. The spark-gap transmitters in the Russian stations generated senseless noise while the Japanese were making attempts to coordinate their efforts in the bombing of a Russian naval base. During World War I, Germany and the United Kingdom interfered with enemy communications along the western front, while the Royal Navy tried to intercept German naval radio transmissions. There were also efforts to send false radio signals, such as having shore stations send transmissions using ships' call signs and jamming enemy radio signals. On the other hand, there were also attempts by the Ottoman side to jam Allied wireless communications during the Gallipoli campaign.

World War II ECM expanded to include dropping chaff (originally called Window), jamming and spoofing radar and navigation signals. German bomber aircraft navigated using radio signals transmitted from ground stations, which the British disrupted with spoofed signals in the Battle of the Beams. During the RAF's night attacks on Germany, the extent of electronic countermeasures was much expanded, and a specialised organisation, No. 100 Group RAF, was formed to counter the increasing German night fighter force and radar defences. Cold War developments included anti-radiation missiles designed to home in on enemy radar transmitters.

In the 2007 Operation Orchard Israeli attack on a suspected Syrian nuclear weapons site, the Israel Air Force used electronic warfare to take control of Syrian airspace before the attack. Israeli electronic warfare (EW) systems took over Syria's air defense systems, feeding them a false sky-picture. At the same time, Israel Air Force jets crossed much of Syria, bombed their targets and returned.

== Radar ECM ==
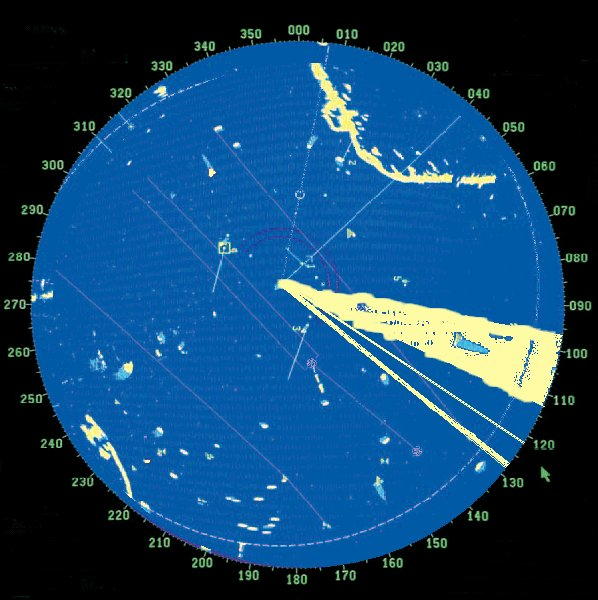
Simulated radar screen in US Navy training exercise showing simulated jamming (triangular white area lower right)

Basic radar ECM strategies are (1) radar interference, (2) target modifications, and (3) changing the electrical properties of air. Interference techniques include jamming and deception. Jamming is accomplished by a friendly platform transmitting signals on the radar frequency to produce a noise level sufficient to hide echoes. The jammer's continuous transmissions will provide a clear direction to the enemy radar, but no range information. Deception may use a transponder to mimic the radar echo with a delay to indicate incorrect range. Transponders may alternatively increase return echo strength to make a small decoy appear to be a larger target. Target modifications include radar absorbing coatings and modifications of the surface shape to either "stealth" a high-value target or enhance reflections from a decoy. Dispersal of small aluminium strips called chaff is a common method of changing the electromagnetic properties of air to provide confusing radar echoes.

== Communications ECM ==
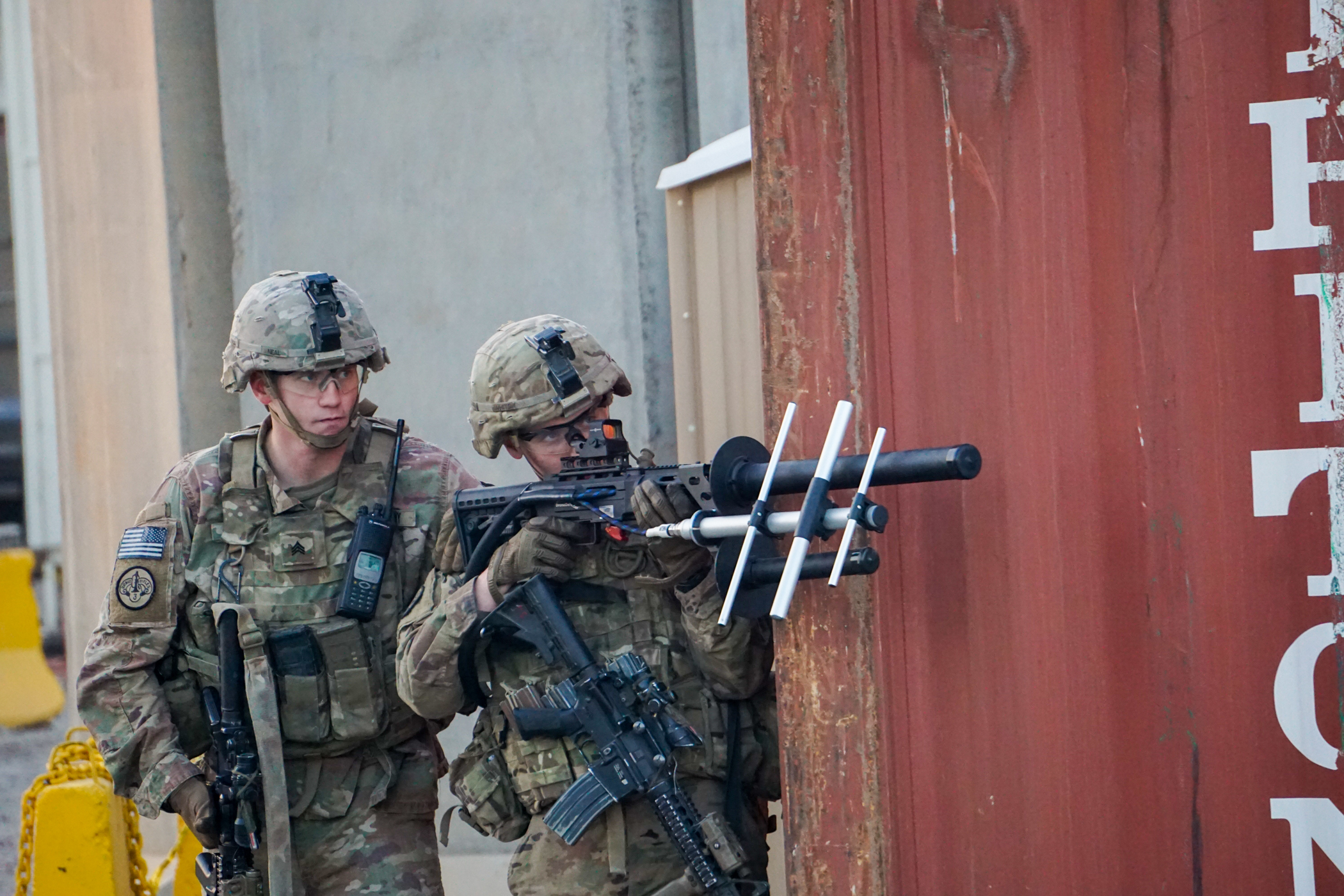
Drone counter measures (1st Squadron, 3rd Cavalry Regiment of the US Army drill with the Battelle DroneDefender, 30 October 2018, Iraq.)

Radio or communications jamming is the deliberate transmission of radio signals that disrupt communications by decreasing the signal-to-noise ratio to the point where the target communications link is either degraded or denied service.

== Aircraft ECM ==
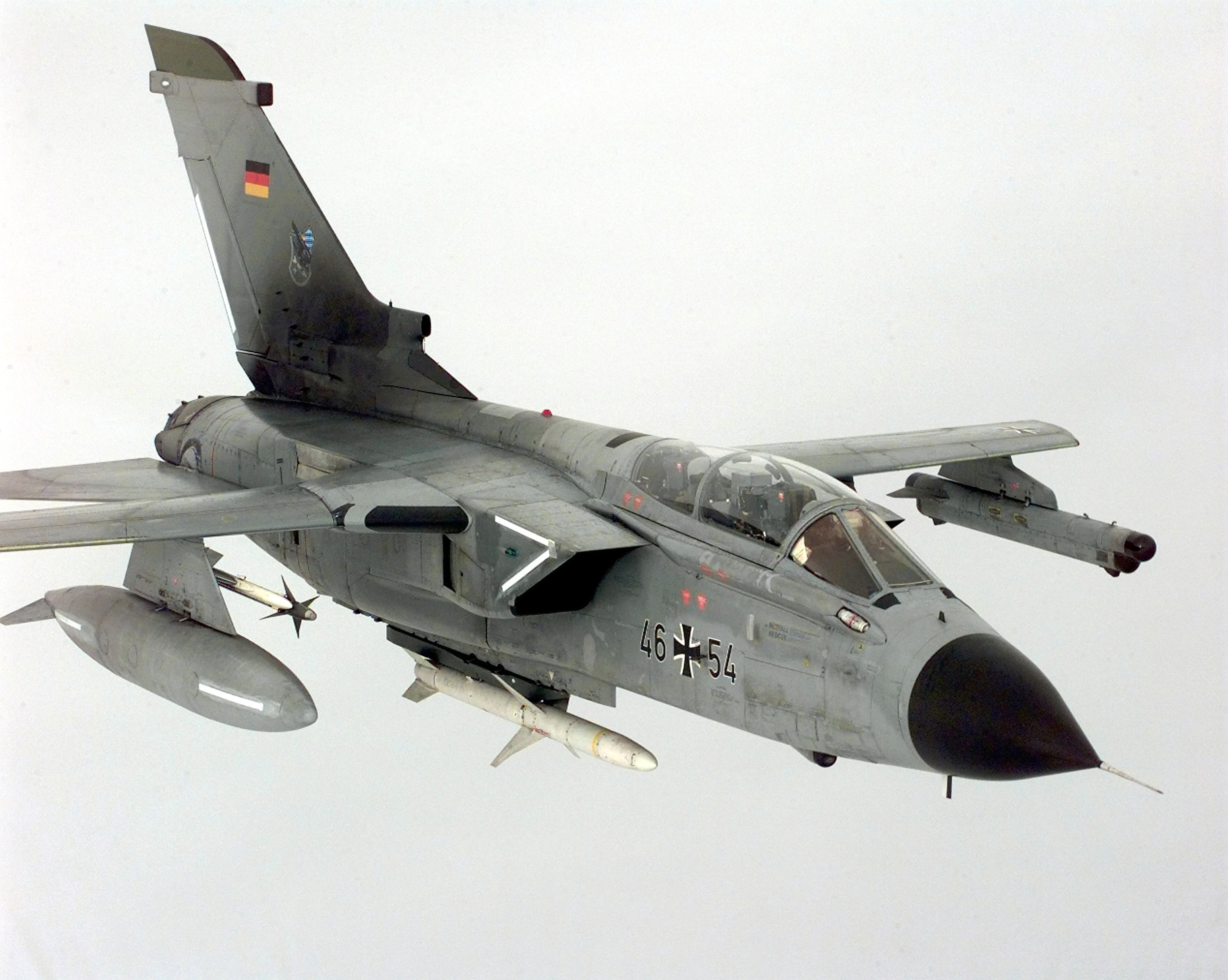
German Tornado ECR

ECM is practiced by nearly all modern military units—land, sea or air. Aircraft, however, are the primary weapons in the ECM battle because they can "see" a larger patch of earth than a sea or land-based unit. When employed effectively, ECM can keep aircraft from being tracked by search radars or targeted by surface-to-air missiles or air-to-air missiles. An aircraft ECM can take the form of an attachable underwing pod or be embedded in the airframe. Fighter planes using a conventional electronically scanned antenna mount dedicated jamming pods instead, or, in the case of the US, German, and Italian air forces, may rely on electronic warfare aircraft to carry them. ECM pods vary widely in power and capability; while many fighter aircraft are capable of carrying an ECM pod, these pods are generally less powerful, capable and of shorter range than the equipment carried by dedicated ECM aircraft, thus making dedicated ECM aircraft an important part of any air force’s inventory.

=== Future airborne jammers ===
The Next Generation Jammer is being developed to replace the current AN/ALQ-99 carried on the E/A-18G electronic warfare plane. Planned for adoption around 2020, it will use a small AESA antenna divided into quadrants for all-around coverage and retain the capability of highly directional jamming.

DARPA's Precision Electronic Warfare (PREW) project aims to develop a low-cost system capable of synchronizing several simple airborne jamming pods with enough precision to replicate the directionality of an electronically scanned antenna, avoiding collateral jamming of non-targeted receivers.

Selex ES has already developed an expendable active decoy that uses DRFM technology to jam RF-based threats. (merged into Leonardo, the new name of Finmeccanica since 2017). The system, named BriteCloud, is self-contained within a small canister similar to a standard flare cartridge. The 55 mm format of the system has undergone flight trials with the Gripen aircraft, and the development of a 218 variant is at an advanced stage.

=== Dedicated ECM aircraft ===
- EA-3 Skywarrior
- EB-66 Destroyer
- EC-130H Compass Call
- EA-6B Prowler equipped with ALQ-92 communications jammer, ALQ-100 multi-band track breaking system, and five ALQ-99 tactical jammer pods.
- EA-18G Growler
- EA-37B Compass Call
- EF-111A Raven
- Tornado ECR
- J-16D
- Su-24MP
- Yak-28PP
- Mi-8PP

== Shipboard ECM ==
The ULQ-6 deception transmitter was one of the earlier shipboard ECM installations. The Raytheon SLQ-32 shipboard ECM package came in three versions, providing warning, identification and bearing information about radar-guided cruise missiles. The SLQ-32 V3 included quick reaction electronic countermeasures for cruisers, large amphibious ships, auxiliaries, and the RBOC (Rapid Blooming Off-board Chaff) launchers found on most surface ships. The BLR-14 Submarine Acoustic Warfare System (or SAWS) provides an integrated receiver, processor, display, and countermeasures launch system for submarines.

== Infrared and acoustic analogies ==
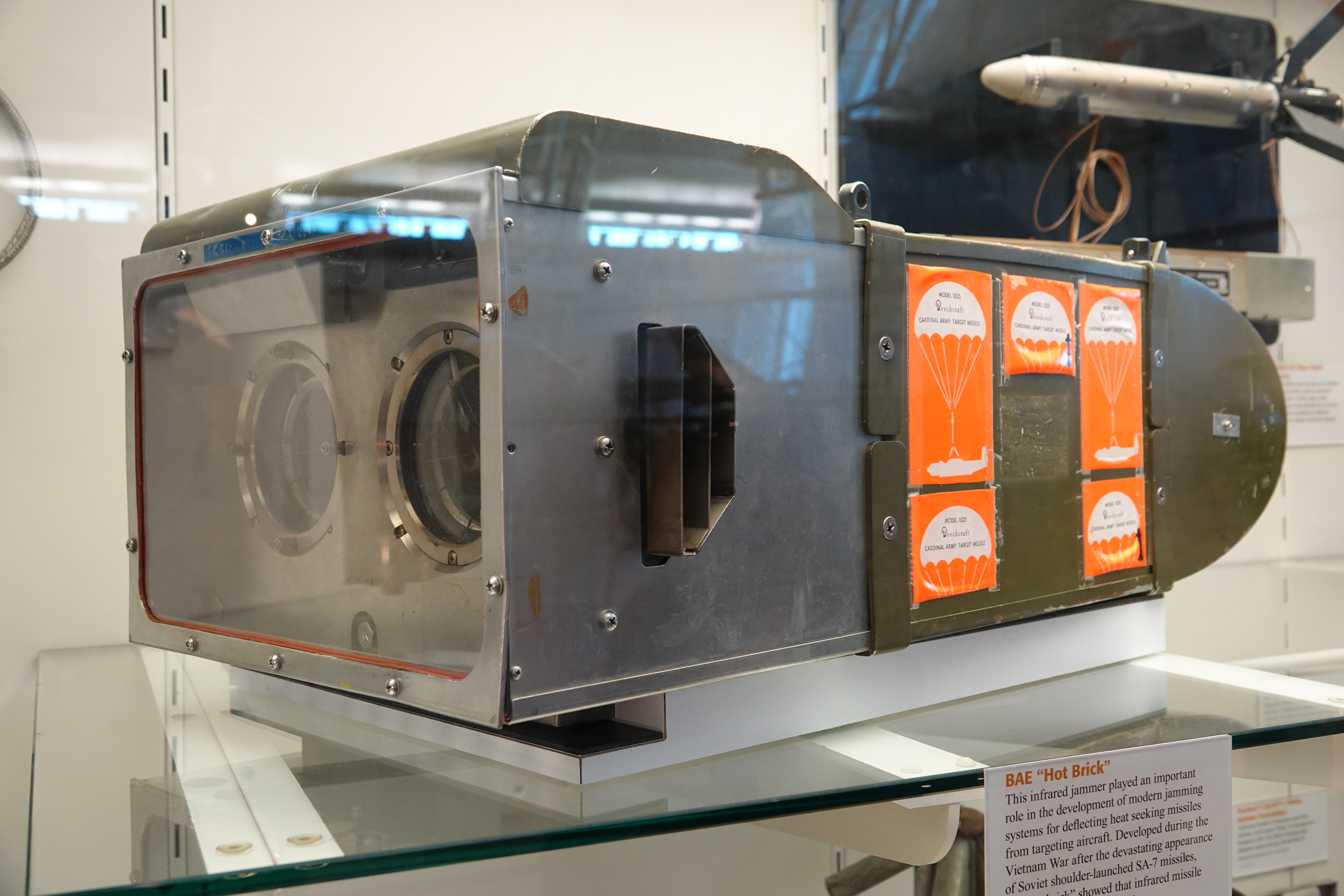
BAE Hot Brick infrared jammer

Infrared homing systems can be decoyed with flares and other infrared countermeasures. Acoustic homing and detection systems used for ships are also susceptible to countermeasures. United States warships use Masker and PRAIRIE (propeller AIR Ingestion and Emission) systems to create small air bubbles around a ship's hull and wake to reduce sound transmission. Surface ships tow noisemakers like the AN/SLQ-25 Nixie to decoy homing torpedoes. Submarines can deploy similar acoustic device countermeasures (or ADCs) from a 3-inch (75-mm) signal launching tube. United States ballistic missile submarines could deploy the Mark 70 MOSS (Mobile submarine simulator) decoy from torpedo tubes to simulate a full size submarine. Most navies additionally equip ships with decoy launchers.

== See also ==
- AN/MSR-T4
- Electronic warfare
  - Electronic warfare support measures
  - Electronic counter-countermeasure
- Khibiny (electronic countermeasures system)
- Krasukha (electronic warfare system)
- No. 100 Group RAF
- Samyukta electronic warfare system
- Starshel rounds
- List of military electronics of the United States
