= Shumensko =

Bulgarian beer brand

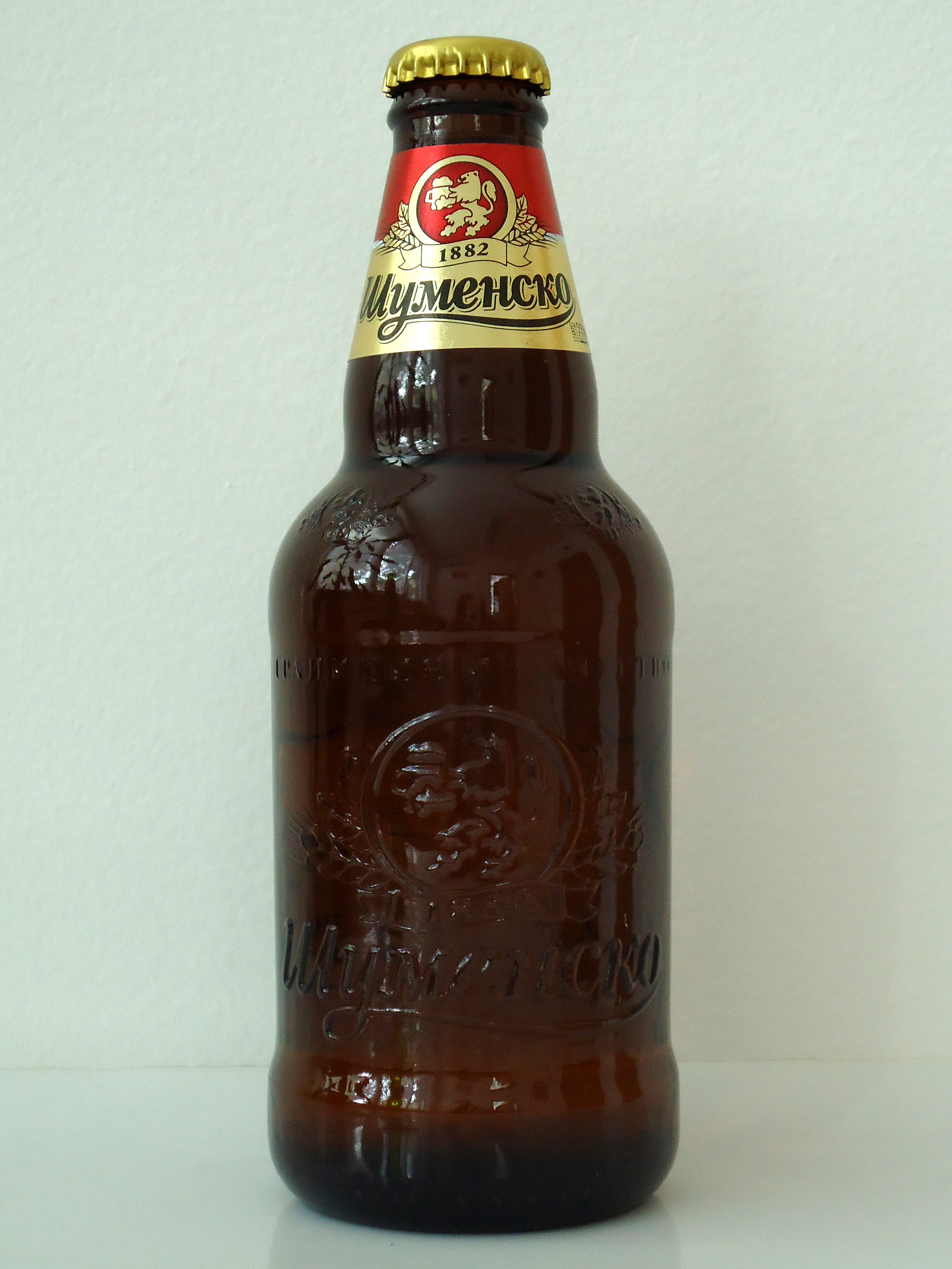

Shumensko is a Bulgarian beer brand (Bulgarian: Шуменско) from the town of Shumen.

The brewery was founded in 1882 by merchants from Shumen and the Czech master brewer Franz Milde, who arrived in September and founded the Bulgarian Brewing Association (Българско пивоварно дружество) on 26 October.

There are currently 6 brands:

- Shumensko Light (Шуменско светло, 4.3% ABV)
- Shumensko Premium (originally Шуменско специално, 5% ABV)
- Shumensko Dark (Шуменско тъмно, 5.5% ABV, available only in winter)
- Shumensko Twist (3 citrus-flavoured brands – lemon, orange and grapefruit, 2% ABV, available only in summer)

A red ale was also temporarily available (Шуменско червено) in the early 2000s.

The beer labels are exclusively written in the Cyrillic alphabet on glass bottles and in Roman script on cans; plastic litre-bottles have each on either side.

Outside of its home town, the beer is also brewed in Blagoevgrad (Pirinsko Pivo), Serbia and Greece.

== Gallery ==
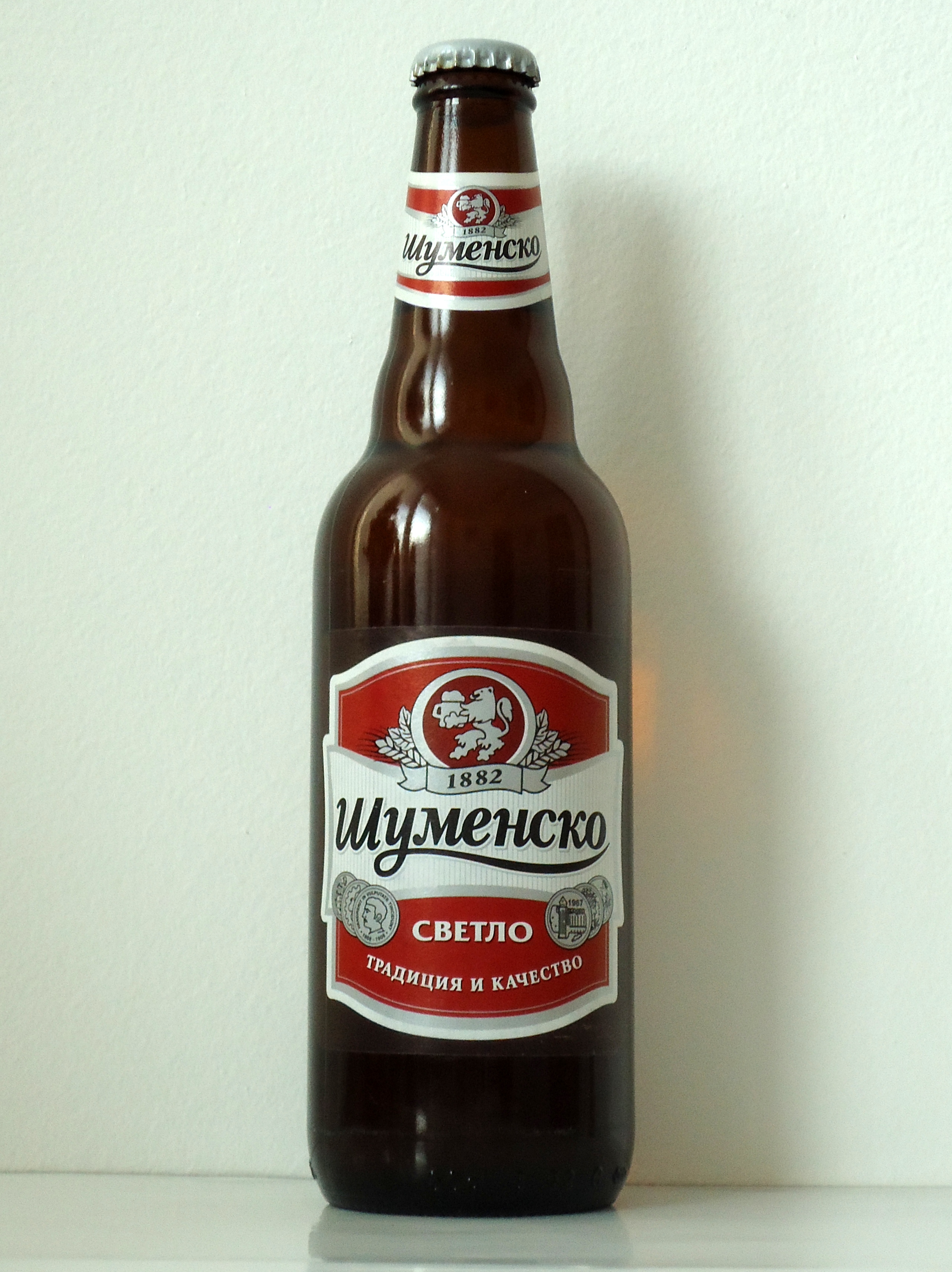
Shumensko Light (2011)

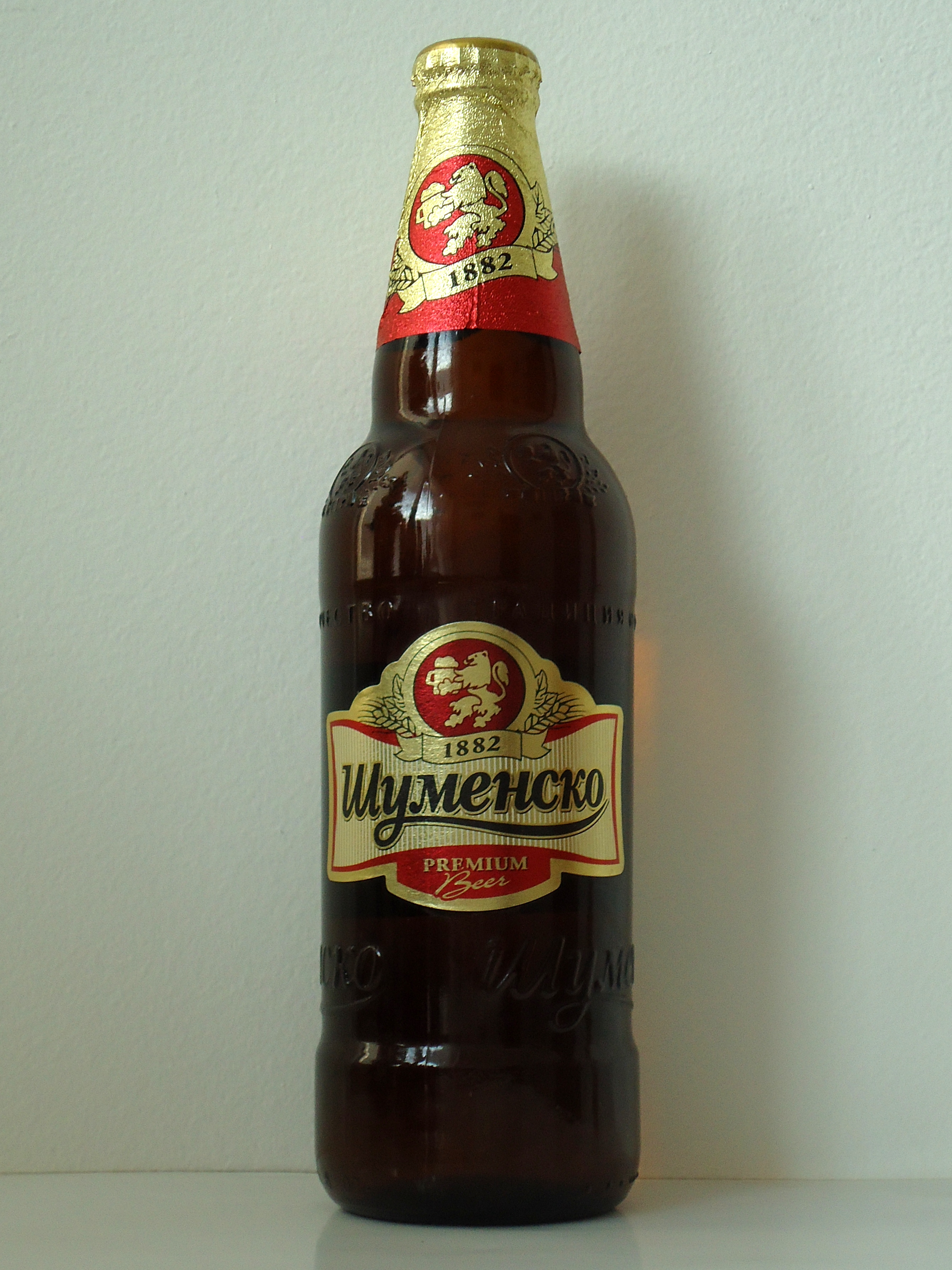
Shumensko Premium (2011)

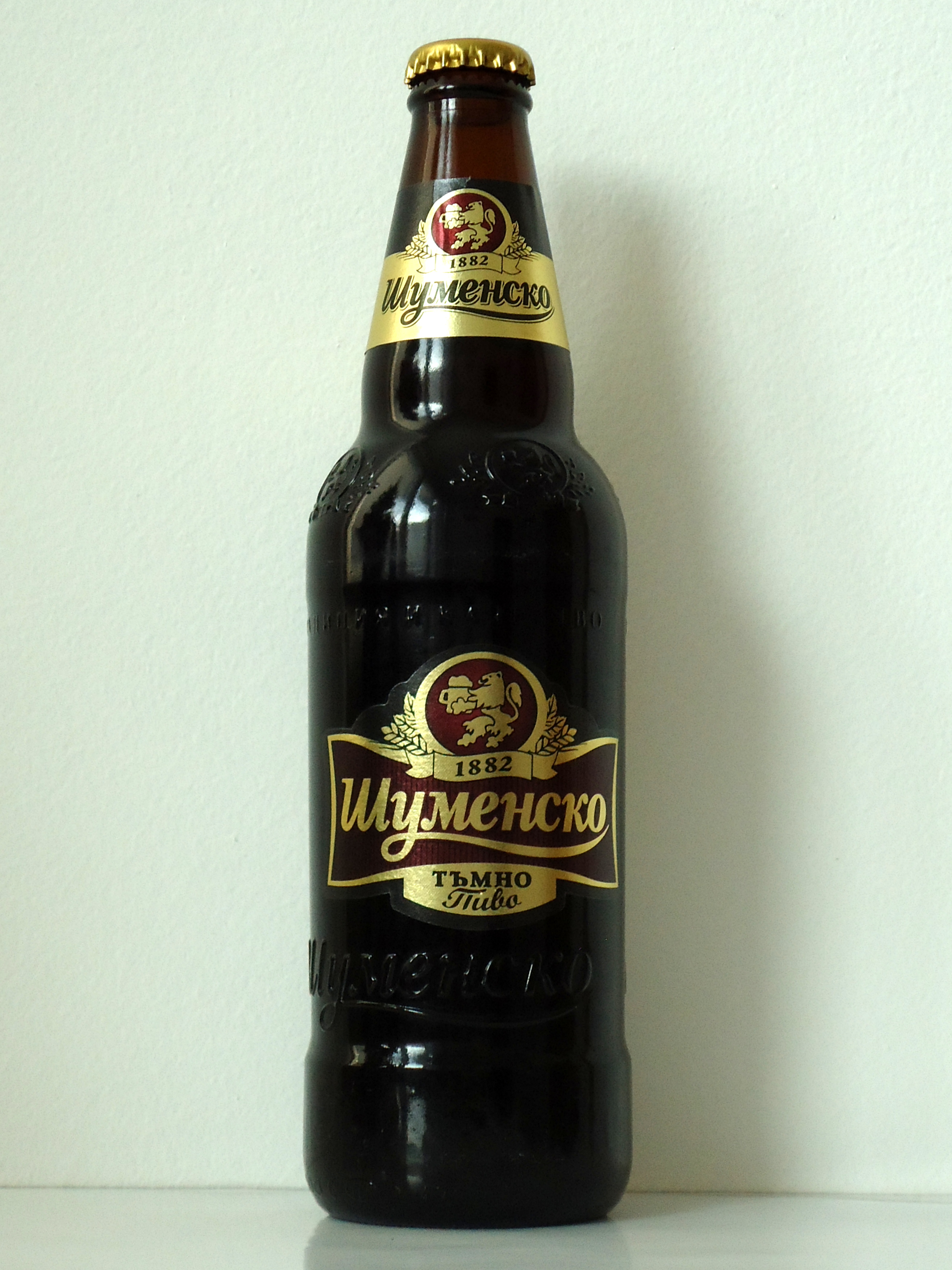
Shumensko Dark (2011)

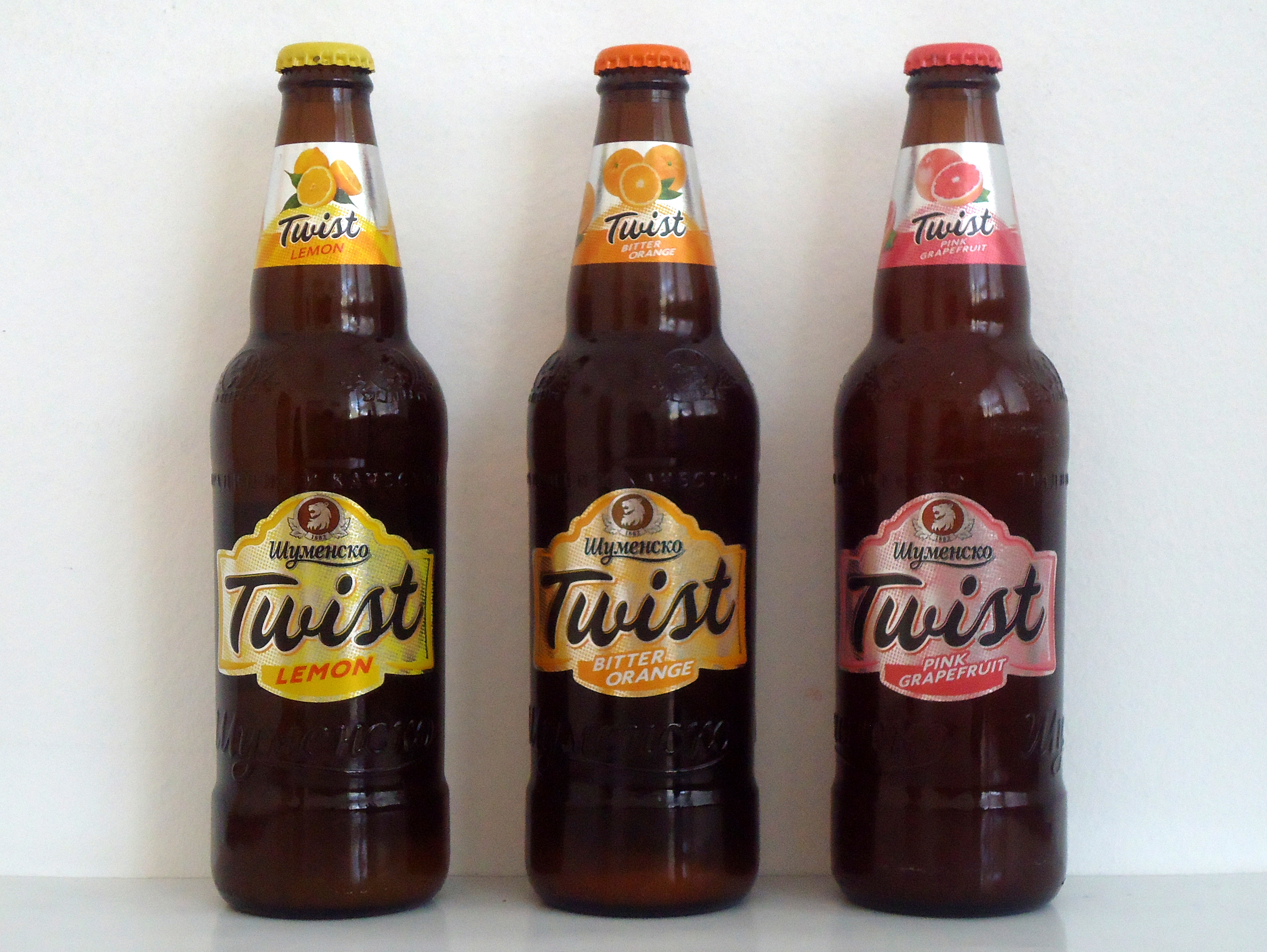
Shumensko Twist (2012)
