= VMZ Sopot =

Armaments factory in Bulgaria

Vazovski Mashinostroitelni Zavodi (VMZ) EAD (Bulgarian: Вазовски машиностроителни заводи, ВМЗ ЕАД) is the largest armaments factory in Bulgaria, which is located in Sopot, Plovdiv Province. It is the only weapons factory still owned by the government of Bulgaria.

== History ==
Construction of the company factory began on 9 June 1936, and on 12 July 1940 an inaugural ceremony to open the state military factory was held. Production commenced with hand grenades, 22 mm HE rounds, 122 mm howitzer rounds, fuzes, 75 mm rounds and 105 mm projectiles for Krupp gun.

Due to the intellectual potential of its engineering staff and high qualification of its executive personnel, a wide assortment of defence and civil items have been manufactured during the years of its existence. VMZ Co. traditionally takes part in various events in the country and abroad where it exhibits its latest defence and civil items. It is a regular participant at the Plovdiv International Fair and Hemus Defence Exhibition.

VMZ Co. is the first and only enterprise decorated with the highest state orders of the Republic of Bulgaria.

In recent years and nowadays, the company has passed through different stages of its development, with various activities and divisions having started and new production facilities opened. In 1977 the company was registered as VMZ Ltd., in 1999 – as VMZ Co.

In 2016, Balkan Insight reported that VMZ-made weapons and ones from other Balkan countries were supplied to groups of the Syrian opposition by the United States, and that some later ended up in the arms of radical groups such as ISIL and others. The Bulgarian government insisted that it was not responsible for the latter.

== See also ==
- Military of Bulgaria
- Defense Industry of Bulgaria
