= Neethi =

Neethi may refer to these Indian films:

- Neethi (1971 film), in Malayalam
- Neethi (1972 film), in Tamil by C. V. Rajendran
- Neethi (2025 film), in Kannada by Rajagopal

== See also ==
- Niti (disambiguation)
