= Overgas =

Overgas Inc. AD
- Company type: Private
- Industry: Oil and gas
- Founded: 1991
- Headquarters: Sofia, Bulgaria
- Key people: Sasho Donchev (Founder)
- Products: Natural gas
- Services: Distribution of natural gas
- Subsidiaries: Overgas Capital AD
- Website: www.overgas.bg

Established in 1991, Overgas is the biggest^{1} Bulgarian private company in the natural gas sector and a leader in developing and providing infrastructure services in the field of gasification in particular. Overgas Group's main activities cover the whole chain of research and development, supply, distribution and sale of natural gas both on wholesale and retail level. Overgas Inc. AD is the biggest independent natural gas supplier and trader on the market. It is the first one to gain access to the infrastructure network paving the way to market liberalization. Part of Overgas Group is Overgas Mrezhi AD, Bulgaria's largest gas distribution company, which currently provides service to over 81,000 end customers. The distributor currently owns over 2,600 km of pipeline inside Bulgaria with plans of rapid expansion in the near future.

In 2021, Linden Energy, a U.S.-based energy development company, has signed an agreement to acquire 50% of Overgas Inc. AD^{2}. Overgas is member of the United Nations Global compact.

The founder of Overgas - Sasho Donchev is a publisher of one of the few independent media in Bulgaria - "Sega" newspaper, which from the end of 2022 is an online website.

He is the author of more than 30 scientific and practical papers and engineering studies, published in Bulgaria, Russia, USA, Germany, Austria, Syria and Libya.

Mr. Donchev is also a main investor in major educational and environmental projects.
