= Balkanstroy =

Company of Bulgaria

- Industry: General contractor (construction)
- Founded: 1994
- Headquarters: Sofia and Razlog, Bulgaria
- Number of locations: 2
- Owner: Nikolay Kaloyanov, Kostadin Kaloyanov, and Yordan Kanazirev
- Website: Balkanstroy.com

Balkanstroy is one of the major construction companies in Bulgaria. It is owned by Nikolay Kaloyanov, Kostadin Kaloyanov, and Yordan Kanazirev. They work on projects in that country and abroad, and have received awards.

The company is the major investor and executor of the "Pirin Golf & Country Club” project, the first vacation golf complex in Bulgaria, which began construction in 2007. The total area of the complex is 1400 decares in the Razlog Valley at the foot of the Pirin Mountains, just three km from the ski resort of Bansko. The company will invest a total of $90 million and employ 540 people in the region during the construction phase; they also built the Lighthouse Gold Resort in Balchik

Balkanstroy was the construction contractor for projects in Sofia such as the Sky City Mall, the Sky Way 4-star hotel and highway projects.
