= Bulgarian Association of Software Companies =

Non-governmental organization

- Abbreviation: BASSCOM
- Formation: 2001
- Website: basscom.org

Bulgarian Association of Software Companies (BASSCOM, Българска асоциация на софтуерните компании, БАСКОМ) is a non-profit organization that unites software companies and organizations related to software development in Bulgaria.

BASSCOM supports the development of the software industry in Bulgaria, protects the interests of software development companies, promotes ethical business relations and promotes the Bulgarian IT and software industry within the local society and internationally.

It was founded in 2001 and has between 11 and 50 employees. The organization tracks the development of Bulgaria's software industry.
