= Starshel =

Bulgarian electronic countermeasures ammunition

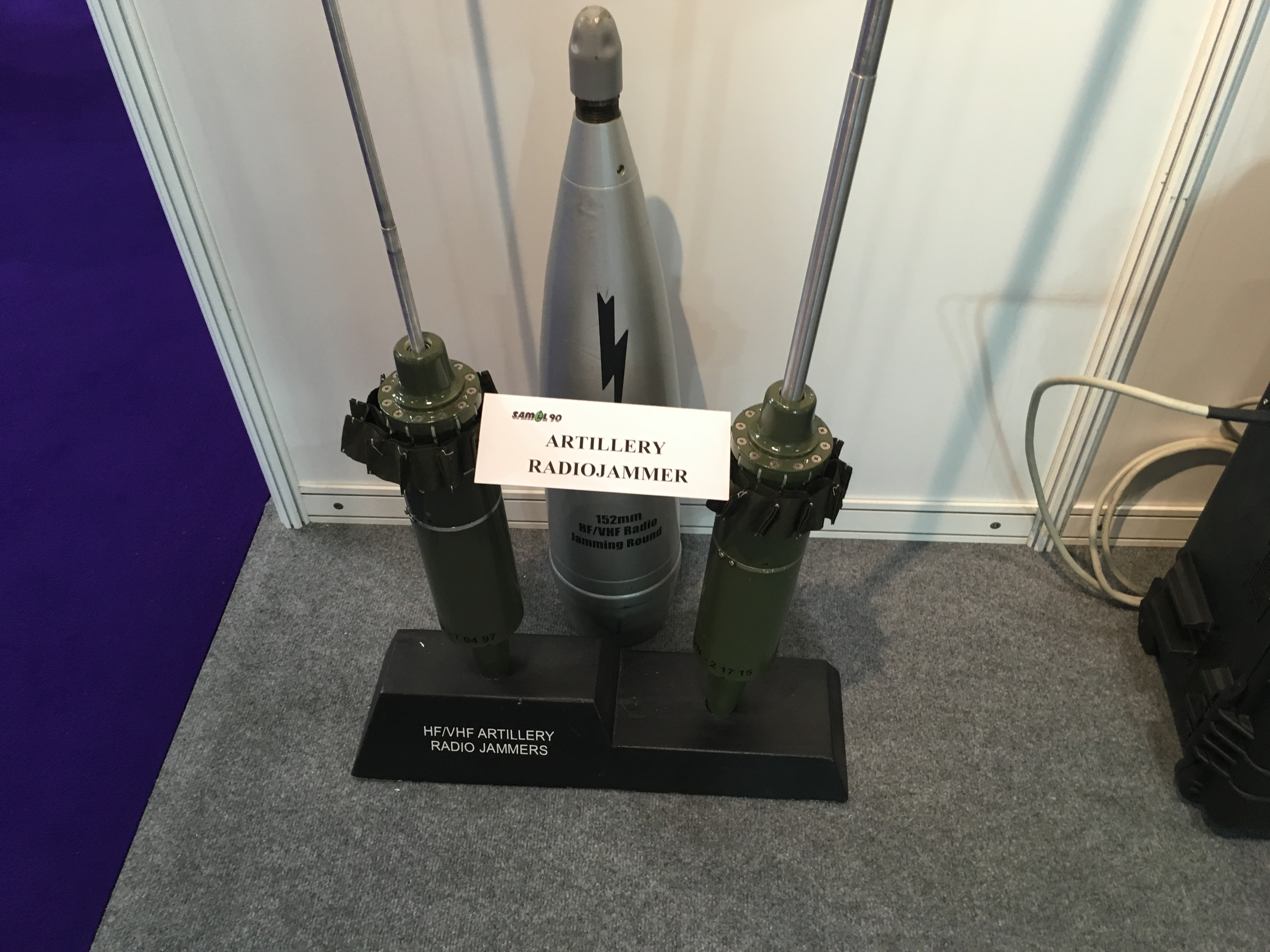
152 mm Starshel radio jamming round on DSEI-2019 from Company Samel90 (Bulgaria)

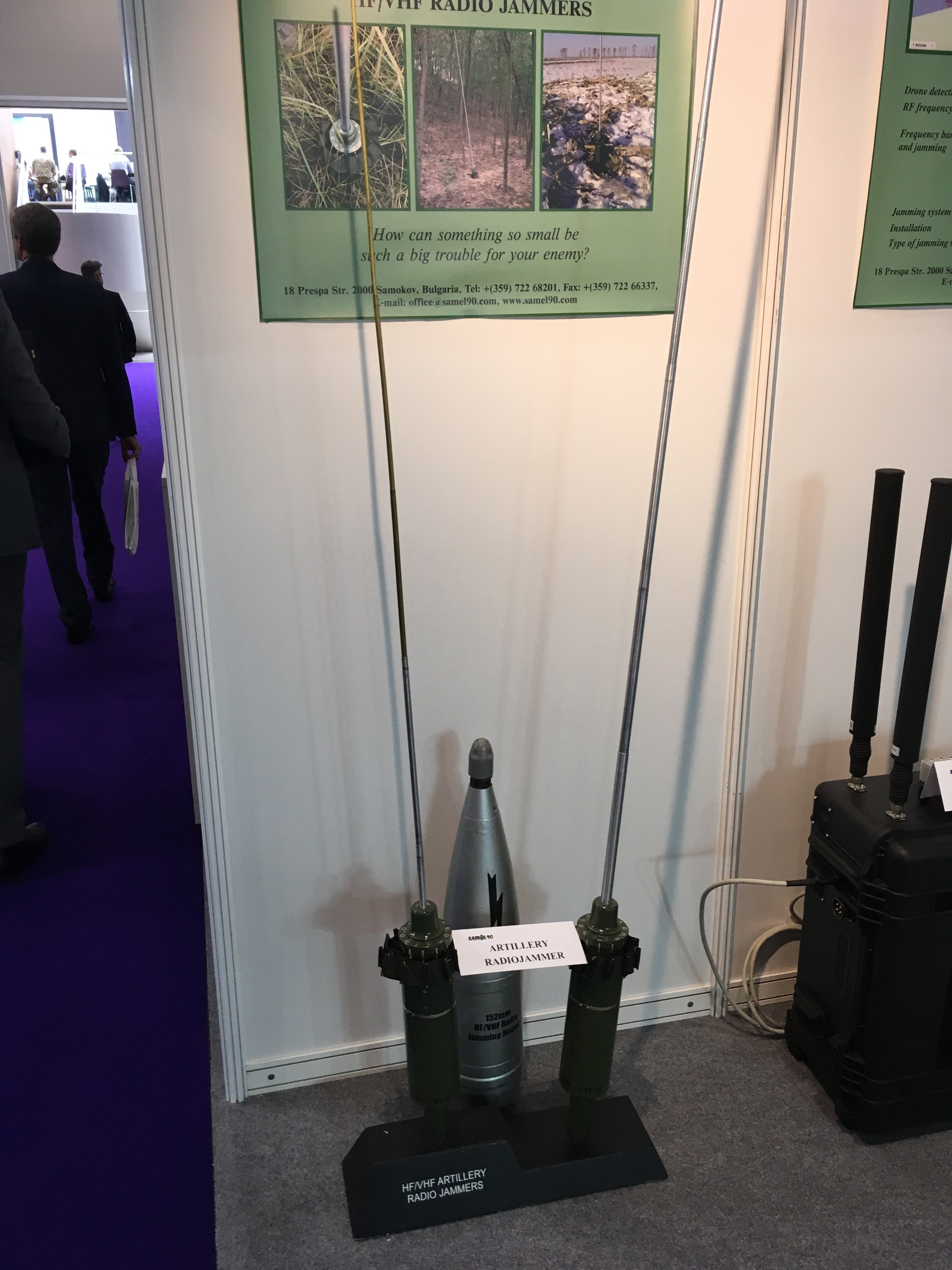
152 mm Starshel Radio Jammer Round, DSEI-2019

R-045/R-046 Starshel (Bulgarian: Стършел, Hornet) is a type of electronic countermeasures ammunition, fired by 122 mm or 152 mm artillery guns. It is designed to completely disrupt enemy radio communications on the battlefield.

== Design and deployment ==
The Starshel rounds were developed and deployed in the early 1980s and were operationally deployed in the mid-80s. By the mid-1990s the rounds were issued to every artillery unit in the Bulgarian army as special ammunition. A full jamming kit consists of several rounds, covering a jamming range of 20 to 100 MHz (with 5 rounds) for the R-045 and from 1.5 to 120 MHz (with 8 rounds) for the R-046. The fins of the round are deployed in-flight. After contact with the ground, an automatic fuze fires the 1,5 meter-long antenna up, which is powered by a small lithium battery for at least an hour. The effective jamming range is at least 700 m. Usually 1 or 2 Starshel kits are used to completely jam enemy front-line communications on a tactical scale.

== Specifications ==
- R-045 range: 3,000–14,500 m (1.9–9.0 mi)
- R-046 range: 4,000–16,500 m (2.5–10.3 mi)
- R-046 weight: 34.56 kg (76.2 lb)
- Storage durability in rough conditions: 3 years
- Storage durability in normal conditions: 10 years

== Compatible artillery ==
Bold indicates equipment, which is currently in service with the Bulgarian military

=== R-045 ===
- **2S1 Gvozdika**
- M-30

=== R-046 ===
- 2S3 Akatsiya
- 152 mm gun 2A36
- 152 mm howitzer 2A65
- **D-20**
