= Blip enhancement =

Blip enhancement is an electronic warfare technique used to fool radar. When the radar transmits a burst of energy some of that energy is reflected off a target and is received back at the radar and processed to determine range and angle. The reflected target energy is called skin return, and the amount of energy returning to the originating radar is directly proportional to the radar cross-section (RCS) of the target.

Basic radars present the target information on a display and displayed targets are referred to as blips. Based on the relative size of the blips on the display, a radar operator could determine large targets from small targets. When a blip enhancing technique is used, small targets returns are augmented to look like large targets.

One early maritime application of this technique was used with an aircraft carrier and its escort ships. Because the aircraft carrier physically dwarfed the other vessels its radar return was much larger making it relatively easy for a radar operator to pick it out as a target. Escort ships were fitted with blip enhance transmitters that received and amplified the radar signal so that all of the escort ships looked like they were aircraft carrier-sized targets. When all the escort ships activated their blip enhance transmitters, all the ships blips grew on the radar display masking the true aircraft carrier blip, and confusing any attempt to target the aircraft carrier for a missile attack.

Modern air warfare still uses a form of blip enhancement to present false targets, through both passive retroreflectors and active amplifying retransmitters. The early ADM-20 Quail uses a passive corner reflector design to present an RCS similar to the Boeing B-52 Stratofortress. The ADM-141 TALD uses both passive Luneburg lens and active radar enhancers. The later ADM-160 MALD only uses a multi-band active system called signature augmentation subsystem, which allows emulating any desired RCS in a range. In addition, stealth aircraft often carry a Luneberg lens on non-combat missions, both to make them more visible on radar and to conceal their actual radar signature.

A larger blip is also useful in smaller civilian aircraft and watercraft. Small watercraft commonly use a passive radar reflector to make them more visible, but active retransmitters/transponders are also commercially available. An active enhancer can potentially provide a larger gain and be mainly used during adverse weather conditions. For small aircraft use, a 1975 US DOT report concludes that passive reflectors provide insufficient enhancement and that contemporary active retransmitters are too likely to interfere with ground radars. It recommends a transponder setup to be used instead.
