= Maxeurope =

Bulgarian manufacturer

- Company type: Private
- Industry: Bicycles and Childcare products Manufacturing
- Headquarters: Plovdiv, Bulgaria
- Products: Bicycles Childcare products
- Website: www.maxeurope.eu

Maxeurope is a leading Bulgarian manufacturer of bicycles and childcare products. The company owns several bicycle and childcare brands.

== History ==
Maxeurope began in 1996 when the first and largest subsidiary – Maxcom, was established as a trading company. The company was selling bicycles under the brand Sprint and childcare products under the trademarks Chipolino and Baby Max. The company grew rapidly and only after a few years it started its own production in Plovdiv, Bulgaria. Soon the bicycles crossed the border and found their place all over Europe, where they became a reference for style, quality and reliability.

The division responsible for Chipolino, Chipolino VIP and Baby Max grew in parallel and in 2007, management separated these brand operations into a newly formed company called Chipolino Ltd. Today, Chipolino brands are well-known and presented in more than 30 countries worldwide.

In 2007, the company finished and put into operation the new production and administrative facilities of Maxeurope. Three years later, this project won the national competition "Building of the Year 2010", category "Industrial buildings and logistic centres".

In 2009, Maxcom further expanded by incorporating Shockblaze, an Italian bicycle manufacturer from Treviso. This venture resulted in the creation a new brand of cycles called Ferrini. The new portfolio of brands and companies required a new solid management structure and thus how in 2010 Maxeurope Holding was officially established.

Three years after the successful launch of the two brands, Maxeurope started cooperation with one of the leaders in the market for folding bikes Dahon. In 2012, the brand chose the holding for the production of its bicycles designed for the European Union.

In 2012, Maxeurope launched a test centre for safety certification of its holding bicycles production. The main purpose of this Centre is to examine and confirm the safety of bicycles produced by the divisions of Maxeurope. The machines in the Testing Centre are designed to conduct tests of the braking system of fully assembled bicycles and a dynamic test called “Structural integrity of the fully assembled bicycle” according to the European standards. The investment in the Testing Centre shows that ensuring the safety of the manufactured products and their constant improvement is a main priority for the company.

The most recent infrastructure investment of Maxeurope include the increase in warehouse area with a further 12 000 sq. meters and a large investment in the latest generation equipment for frames and forks painting.

== Products ==
Bicycles

- Hard tail mountain bikes
- Full suspension mountain bikes
- Road bikes
- Trekking / off-road bikes
- Trekking / on road bikes
- City bikes
- BMX/ Dirt jump
- Kids bikes

Childcare products

- Baby strollers
- Lightweight strollers
- Twin strollers
- Baby carriers
- Accessories

== Brands ==
The following brands are part of the Maxeurope Group:

- Shockblaze (group's performance bikes)
- Ferrini (elegant bicycles with Italian style)
- Sprint (symbol of the company’s bicycle manufacturing traditions)
- Chipolino (childcare products)
- Velotec (wheels and rims)
