= Central Energy Repair Base (Bulgaria) =

Bulgarian energy equipment repair company

CENTRAL ENERGY REPAIR BASE JSC (CERB)
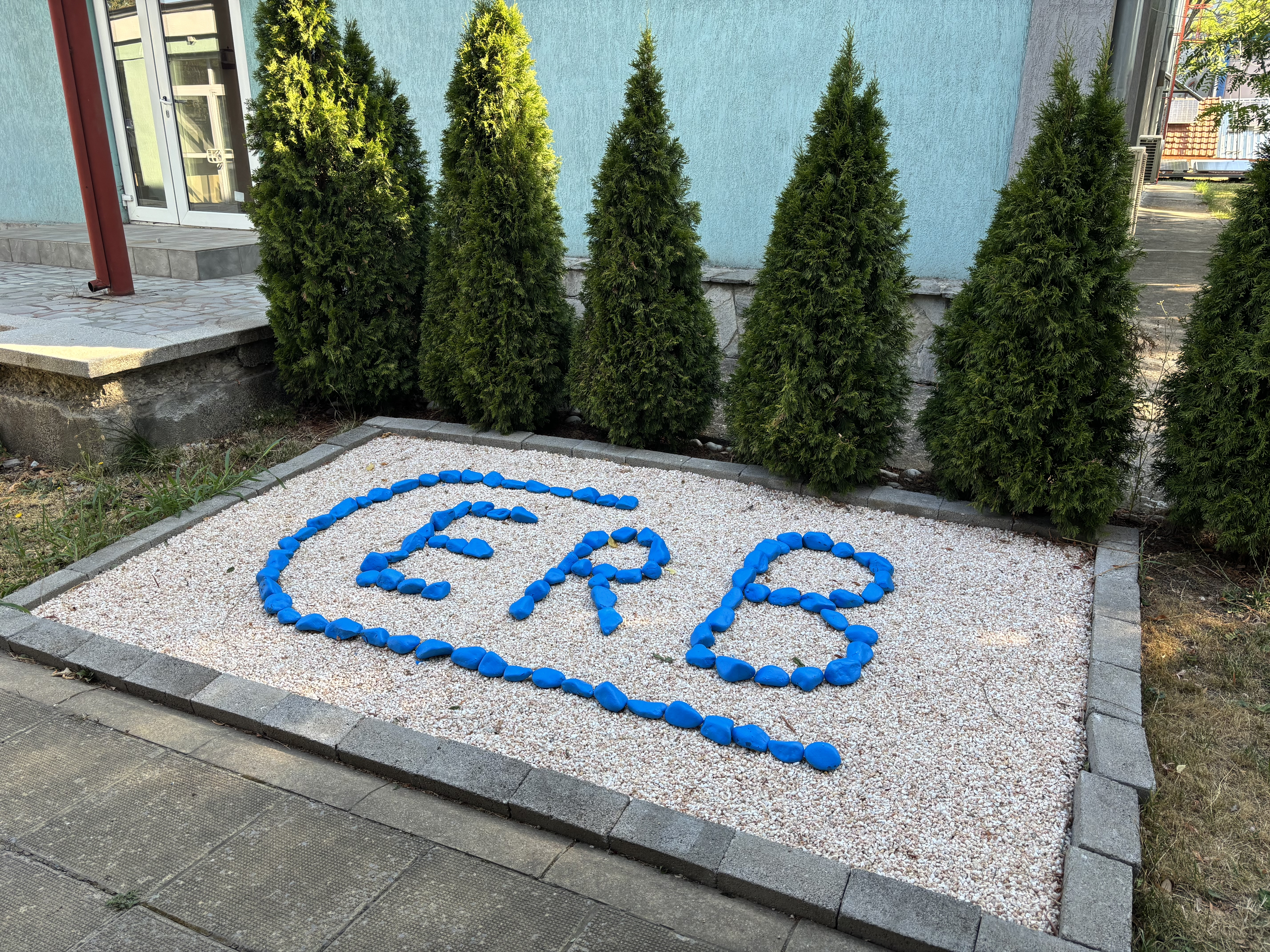
- Industry: Energy, electricity
- Founded: 1948
- Headquarters: Sofia, Bulgaria
- Key people: Dimiter Beleliev (Chairman of the Board of Directors)
- Services: manufacturing, diagnostics, maintenance and repair of all kinds of rotating electrical machines and transformers
- Number of employees: 150 (2013)
- Website: www.cerb.bg

CENTRAL ENERGY REPAIR BASE JSC (CERB) (Bulgarian: Централна енергоремонтна база) is the only Bulgarian enterprise for maintenance and repair of equipment in conventional and non-conventional energy sectors. It is the oldest energy repair company in Bulgaria. The company was established in 1948 with the opening of a workshop for the repair of rotating electrical machines. 75 years later, in 2023, it is a group of 25 energy companies.

== Activities ==
CERB specializes in the production, diagnostics, maintenance, and repair of rotating electrical machines and transformers. Performs vibration diagnostics and balancing. It has accredited laboratories, a foundry, industrial dry ice cleaning, etc. It owns the only operating wagon boat on the Balkan Peninsula for transporting heavy oversized cargo by rail.

== Background ==
- CERB was established in 1948 with the opening of a small workshop for the repair of rotating electrical machines.

- 1956 - Transformer repair begins. A mechanical workshop is also opened.

- 1965 - A department for the transport of heavy and oversized cargo is opened.

- 1975 - A metal control center is created.

- 1979 - Chemical laboratory for the analysis of transformer oils. Repair of step regulators, electrical installation of networks and devices for low and medium voltage, industrial and civil construction, supply of energy equipment begins.

- 1994 - The company is registered as a joint-stock company.

- 2001 - The company is privatized.

- 2018 - CERB starts providing solutions in solar energy as well.

- 2023 - CERB covers 25 energy companies.

== Production facilities ==
The company's capacities are located in 20 000 sq m area, including 4 main manufacturing buildings (department for rotating electrical machines, transformers, transport and mechanical department); 3 laboratories (for analyzing and testing of transformers oil, high-voltage testing laboratory and control of metals centre); department for vibration analyzes and dynamic balancing; as well as vocational training centre of welders.

== Projects ==
CERB maintains electrical equipment for NEK, ESO, Energo-Pro Networks, CEZ Razpredelenie Bulgaria, Mini Maritsa East, Lukoil Neftochim.

It works on projects for energy companies in Southeast Europe. Among them are the national electricity company of Greece - Public Power Corporation S.A, METKA Greece, ELEM North Macedonia, the national electricity company of Kosovo - KEK, the largest energy company in Bosnia and Herzegovina - Elektroprivreda BiH, Energo-Pro Czech Republic, the largest HPP in Albania, etc. The company also has implemented energy projects in Turkey, Lebanon, Syria, Ukraine, etc.

== Awards ==
Two gold medals for innovation, International Technical Fair Plovdiv, 2023: System for remote energy monitoring and management (EMS) of microgrids and for a Powerful hybrid charging station for electric vehicles with a photovoltaic power plant and batteries Three gold medals and a diploma, International Technical Fair Plovdiv, 2022: Complex diagnostics "Passportization" of power and special transformers, Battery system for storing energy from renewable sources (CERB BESS) and for Active resistors for grounding the neutral point of power transformers.

Gold Medal for Vibration Monitoring and Diagnostics, International Technical Fair in Plovdiv, 2015.

Award for Innovative Bulgarian Product for Vibro Health+ - a system that reduces the risk of accidents in power plants - Bulgarian Association of Electrical Engineering and Electronics (BAEE), 2015.

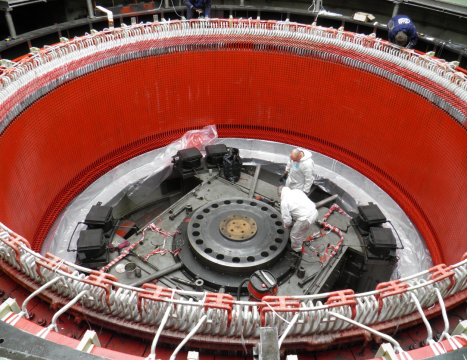
CERB Rehabilitation of a stator

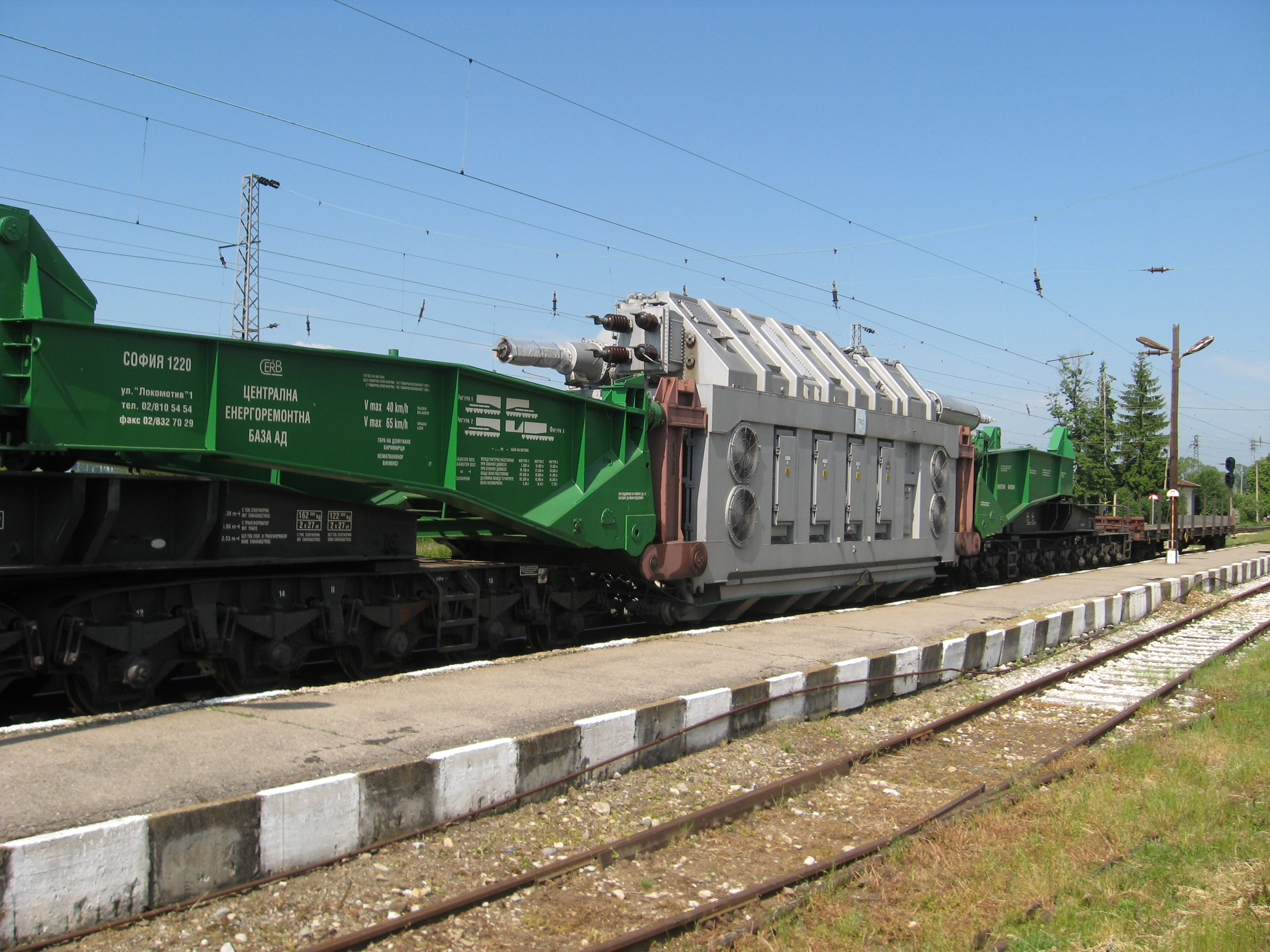
CERB Railroad wagon
