= Armimex =

Bulgarian state-owned company

Armimex was a state–owned Bulgarian company with a full license for export, import and re–export of all types of weapons, ammunition and special products for the army and the police.

Armimex was established in 1992 as a specialised company for trade with special and dual–use equipment, by a decree of the Council of Ministers of the Republic of Bulgaria. It is a public limited company incorporating the 23 main military factories in Bulgaria as shareholders.

== Establishment of the company ==
Because of the deep political and economic changes and the abrogation of the Warsaw Pact on March 2, 1992, the main Bulgarian arms trading company during the communist period—GIU (Main Engineering Department) – was liquidated with a Regulation 21 by the Council of the Ministers. The GIU's liquidation procedures continued into 1994, without any proper resolution of its debt. On April 16, 1992, a new state-owned trading company, Armimex LLC, was established, representing the interests of the largest military enterprises in Bulgaria. The company incorporated 23 of Bulgaria's largest defence industry companies as shareholders: VMZ, Arsenal, Optikoelektron, Beta, Samel-90, and Arkus among others. It has both a board of directors appointed by the shareholder companies and a supervisory council appointed directly by the government. It received part of the assets of GIU, but is not its successor in the juridical sense. Armimex also became the holder of Russian production licenses given to Bulgaria.

Armimex incorporated a vast array of activities, including import, export and re-export of military and civilian products, training of foreign specialists, repair and overhaul, engineering activity in establishing enterprises and production facilities, as well as investment activity and the rendering of technical assistance.

The export list of Armimex consisted of military equipment for all services of the armed forces including armament, ammunition, armoured vehicles, engineering equipment and explosives, aiming and surveillance equipment, communication and electronic warfare equipment, radar equipment, naval craft, equipment, et cetera. Along with that, the export list of the company consisted of constantly increasing share of military items by NATO standards.

During the 1990s, the company made some significant arms deals in Nigeria, Yemen, Bangladesh and other countries.

The Israeli plane brought down in Mombassa, Kenya in 2002 by Al Qaeda was shot at with Bulgarian SAM "Strela". Their identification number showed that they were produced at the Armaments plant in Sopot in 1991-93. They were exported to Yemen by Armimex in 1993. The deal amounted to about USD 8 million, and it was between the Ministry of Defence of Yemen and the Bulgarian Ministry of Defence.

== Sting Operation ==
Armimex became infamous after the successful US operation against a big illicit arms deal. In March 1995 a broker in Florida met with a Lithuanian national of Russian origin, Alexander Darichev. The broker explained he was a member of a Colombian drug cartel, and was looking for sophisticated weaponry. Darichev presented himself as a broker of weapons and weapon systems with contacts in government agencies in Russia, Lithuania, Bulgaria and elsewhere. Representing a company, Armimex, in Bulgaria that was apparently licensed to manufacture Russian weapon designs, Darichev offered a whole range of weaponry, from automatic rifles to shoulder-launched surface-to-air missiles. The client showed an interest in the Russian anti-aircraft missiles, including Strela 2M, Strela 3M and Igla systems, which are designed to destroy low-flying airplanes or helicopters. If the deal went through successfully, Darichev and a partner of his, Aleksandr Pogrebezskij of Lithuania, hoped also to be able to procure nuclear warheads.

During several meetings in the following months between the broker and Darichev, a complex mechanism was set up, using front companies and government officials on both sides of the Atlantic. The Lithuanians wanted the deal to look legitimate. In Florida, the agent of the Colombian narcotics traffickers set up a company called Phoenix International. In April 1996, one year after the first meeting, the US-based broker went to Russia to examine the weapon systems. In the following months, a company and several bank accounts on the Isle of Man were opened, in order to facilitate the financial end. The value of the missile contracts totalled over $3 million; upon delivery of two sample missile systems, a first payment of $50,000 would be made. The money was then to be channelled through a US account at Prudential Securities in the name of another company, Alita Corporation.

In December 1996, Pogrebezskij instructed Prudential Securities in Florida to transfer the money to New York. Two days later, $49,800 was transferred from Prudential Securities in New York to Snoras Bank in Vilnius, Lithuania. The Lithuanians had arranged for the transport of the missiles, through the services of Angelo Zeini, the Cypriot owner of merchant ships who had offered his vessel, the M/V AI Fares, to smuggle the missile systems into the USA. Zeini would send the ship to Bulgaria to pick up the weapons systems and use false paperwork, provided by the Lithuanians, indicating that the ship would be transporting 15 forty-foot containers of machinery and general cargo to Puerto Rico. One container, with the missile systems, would be commingled with the others in order to pass inspection at the Straits of Gibraltar.

Because Armimex could sell these kinds of weapons only to governments, Darichev and Pogrebezskij arranged to acquire an end-user certificate from the Republic of Lithuania, signed by and bearing the seal of the Lithuanian Minister of Defense. The client was also reassured that if the missile systems were to be used, they could not be traced and that the Lithuanian Ministry of Defence would issue a false letter of receipt upon delivery of the weapons in Puerto Rico.

In July 1997, the negotiations came to an end. At a meeting in a hotel in Miami, US agents arrested Pogrebezskij and Darichev. What the Lithuanians had not realised was that their US brokers were not representing Colombian narcotics traffickers: they were undercover US customs agents from Miami, exposing the first credible post–Cold War plot to smuggle tactical nuclear weapons into the USA. The customs agents had wanted to continue their investigation up to the point of actually purchasing the nuclear devices, but only the missile part of the deal had been permissible under US national security regulations.

After his arrest, Darichev cooperated with the US District Court Attorney and made monitored calls to the Bulgarian company Armimex confirming that 40 shoulder-to-air missiles were indeed waiting to be shipped to Phoenix Arms International. The US Justice Department also determined that the Lithuanian Minister of Defense had in fact signed the end-user certificates. He later resigned. Darichev and Pogrebezskij were convicted on charges of smuggling, money laundering and conspiracy. As in many such prosecutions in the United States, they were given only a four-year sentence in a federal penitentiary.

In June 2003, the Sofia City Court ruled Armimex bankrupt, terminating its operation and ordering a liquidation of its assets.
