= Vitta Foods =

- Type: Private label
- Industry: Manufacturing and distribution of frozen foods
- Founded: 2006
- Headquarters: Svilengrad, Bulgaria
- Key people: Hristo Yanev
- Revenue: Unknown
- Website: www.vittafoods.bg

Vitta Foods is a company specialised in manufacturing and distribution of frozen products made of puff pastry and sheets of filo pastry in eco paper plates, founded in 2006 as a part of Green Holding JSC. The main offices are in Sofia and Svilengrad.

The manufacturing processes are automatic and supported by equipment from leading German, Japanese, Italian, Greek and Swedish manufacturers of machines for the food processing industry. The company has adopted an internal HACCP system for the management of food safety.

Vitta Foods has a contract with The University for Food Technologies – Plovdiv and the first results from this work in collaboration are the frozen products with the brand “Tsaritsa” – traditional “homemade” spiral pastry pies, rolls and small spiral pies of traditional Bulgarian paper-thin sheets of filo pastry.

The company has its own fleet of temperature controlled vehicles and the distribution network covers the whole territory of Bulgaria, serving all distribution channels – retail outlets, hotels, restaurants and cafés.

== Production ==
The brand Vitta Catering offers products made of traditional Bulgarian paper-thin sheets of filo pastry - spiral small pies and rolls with various sweet or savory fillings – white cheese, spinach and white cheese, pumpkin, apple, ham and yellow cheese and puff pastry products - puff pastry bites with various fillings – yellow cheese, white cheese, apple and chocolate; a wide variety of exotic fillings such as – pizza, tuna fish, wild berries.

The brand Tsaritsa offers traditional “homemade” spiral filo pastry pie Tsaritsa with a rich filling of cheese, spinach and cheese, pumpkin; traditional “home-made” filo pastry rolls Tsaritsa with a rich filling of cheese, spinach and cheese; spiral small pies of traditional Bulgarian paper-thin sheets of filo pastry Tsaritsa with a rich filling of cheese, spinach and cheese.

== Events ==
Vitta Foods participated in the PLMA’s annual "World of Private Label" International Trade Show, held on 27–28 May at the RAI Exhibition Centre in Amsterdam with a stand in the Fresh and Frozen Pavilion, Europa Complex.

The company participated in the Plovdiv International Fair and was awarded with a gold medal and a certificate for the products with the brand Tsaritsa at the official ceremony on 14 May 2008.
