= Navibulgar =

Bulgarian shipping company

- Company type: Public
- Industry: Shipping
- Founded: 1892
- Headquarters: Varna, Bulgaria
- Revenue: US$267 million (2006)
- Number of employees: 4,000 (2006)

Navibulgar is a Bulgarian shipping company, the largest in the country, with a fleet of 70 vessels: 46 bulk carriers, 9 container vessels, 5 tanker and chemical vessels, and 10 combined tonnage vessels, including their new 30,700-tonne ship, which became a part of their fleet in June 2012.

== Acquisitions ==
In 2002, the company acquired Varna shipyard for $16.1 million.

In May 2014, Navibulgar completed its set of modern domestically built handymax ships with a deal for a Greek-owned bulker. The vessel is named Wanderlust and was originally ordered for design and building in 1997.

== 2025 cable cutting incident ==
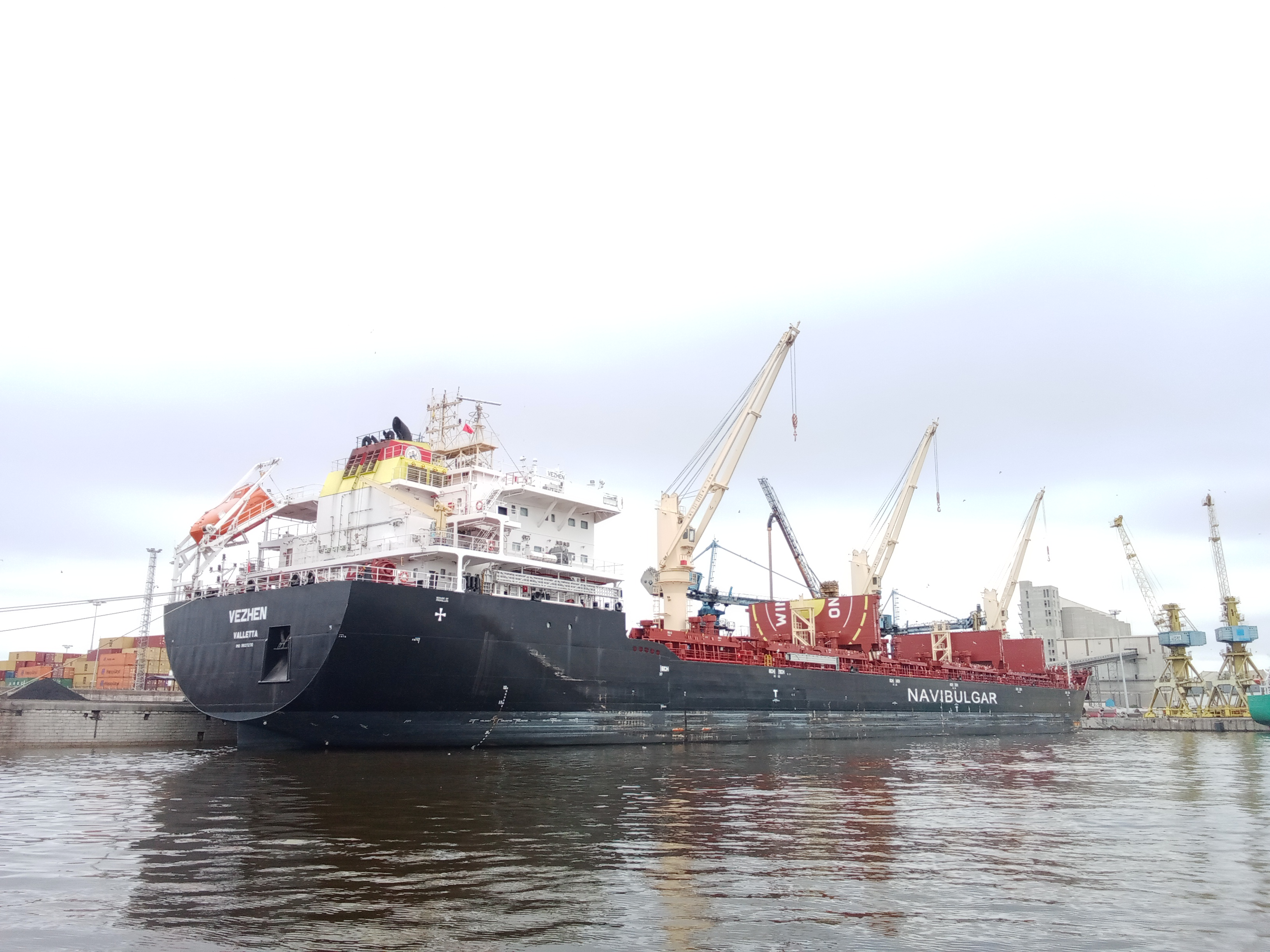
The Vezhen in 2023.

In January 2025 the Navibulgar bulk carrier Vezhen was seized in the Baltic Sea off Karlskrona by Swedish police forces, after a submarine communication cable between Latvia and Sweden had been severed on 26 January. Similar to the cases of Yi Peng 3 and the Eagle S, who are suspected of having cut submarine cables in the Baltic Sea a few weeks prior, using their anchors, the Vezhen is suspected to have committed sabotage under incentive from Russia. Navibulgar CEO Aleksander Kalchev denied that the crew had intentionally committed sabotage, but admitted that they had noticed one of the ships anchors to be damaged on 26 January and said an accident could not be ruled out. Another vessel, the Norwegian-flagged Silver Dania, crewed by native Russians and shuttling between St. Petersburg and Murmansk, was also suspected of having cut the cable, but was released after a short inspection in Tromso.

On 2 February 2025, a Swedish prosecutor said the incident was an accident, not sabotage, and the Vezhen had been released. Video had shown a wave hitting the anchor lock which released the anchor, and the autopilot continued to drag the anchor, and the case was closed by October 2025.
