= Armstechno NITI =

NITI
- A rare picture of NITI in flight.

General information
- Type: Remote controlled UAV
- Manufacturer: Armstechno

History
- First flight: 2006

NITI (Bulgarian: НИТИ) is a very light-weight, stealthy remote-controlled Bulgarian unmanned aerial vehicle (UAV). It has been designed and constructed in 2006 by Armstechno Ltd. It mounts a color surveillance camera, a thermal vision camera, and has an option for adding chemical and radioactive contamination dosimeters. Its main tasks are air surveillance of contaminated areas, regions with possible terrorist group activity, artillery correction or observation of natural disaster-stricken areas. NITI has a maximum fuel capacity of 38 L. It also has a programmable autopilot system and GPS system.

In 2011, NITI was evaluated by the Ministry of the Interior (MI) of Bulgaria, but the design was rejected due to numerous defects, an unreliable design and the inability of the aircraft to perform its tasks. The CEO of Armstechno Co. blamed the unsatisfactory performance of its UAVs on the poor training of MI operators.

== Specifications ==
Data from

General characteristics

- Length: 3 m (9 ft 10 in)
- Wingspan: 5.38 m (17 ft 8 in)
- Height: .55 m (1 ft 10 in)
- Wing area: 2.35 m^{2} (25.3 sq ft)
- Max takeoff weight: 60 kg (132 lb)
- Powerplant: 1 × 3W 106iB2 2-cylinder air-cooled in-line piston engine, 8 kW (11 hp)
- Propellers: 2-bladed pusher propeller

Performance

- Maximum speed: 120 km/h (75 mph, 65 kn) +
- Cruise speed: 90–110 km/h (56–68 mph, 49–59 kn)
- Range: 500 km (310 mi, 270 nmi)
- Service ceiling: 5,000 m (16,000 ft)

== See also ==
- RQ-2 Pioneer
- RQ-11 Raven
