= Kintex (Bulgaria) =

Bulgarian state-owned company

Kintex is a Bulgarian state-owned company, founded in Sofia, Bulgaria, in 1966.

Until 1992 essentially an arm of the Bulgarian Communist Party's secret service, the Committee for State Security, Kintex was an import-export corporation, which controlled the sale of everything from cigarettes to heavy weapons. Kintex was responsible for selling weapons to smugglers and terrorists, with both right wing and left wing political sympathies, in Turkey, in the 1970s.

== Smuggler of contraband ==
The first large export of weapons from Bulgaria was to Algeria in 1961–1962. Kintex maintained three bases in Sofia to load smuggled goods. These shipments were conveyed by sea to Turkey, travelling through the ports of Varna and Burgas. They were shipped aboard Bulgarian or foreign ships. Kintex realised an annual revenue from smuggling goods of between $5 million and $15 million. In the first years money was transported in suitcases. Following 1985 payments were made via transborder companies which were established by Bulgarian state security and the foreign trade ministry, usually in offshore zones. These entities were shielded by local citizens who were agents of the secret police.

== Post-communist era ==
Currently Kintex is located at 66, James Bourchier Boulevard, 1407 Sofia. For more than four decades the business has been making contracts to supply technical military production, armament, and ammunition. It has carried out engineering projects in Africa, Asia, and the Middle East.

In 1992 Kintex was changed to a company governed by commercial law, which limited its shares. Commercial law became effective in Bulgaria in 1992. All of its shares are owned by the state. Kintex is licensed to export, import, and re-export products for the Bulgarian Army and police.
