= Varna shipyard =

Varna Shipyard
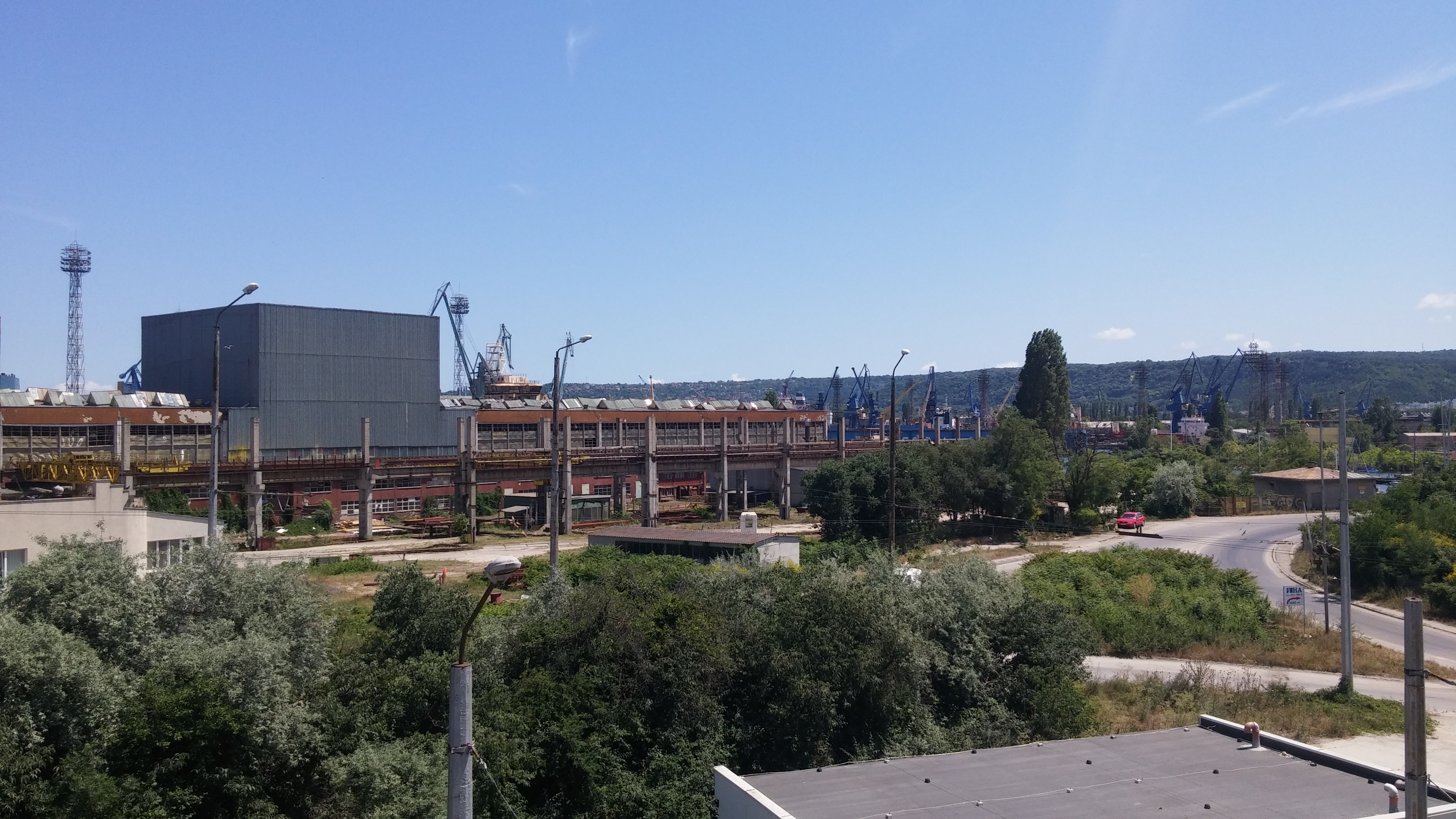
- Company type: Open joint-stock company
- Industry: Shipbuilding
- Founded: 1907

The Varna Shipyard (Bulgarian: Варненска корабостроителница) is one of the oldest shipyards in Bulgaria. It is located in Varna in the south-eastern part of the town. It is one of three active shipyards in Bulgaria.

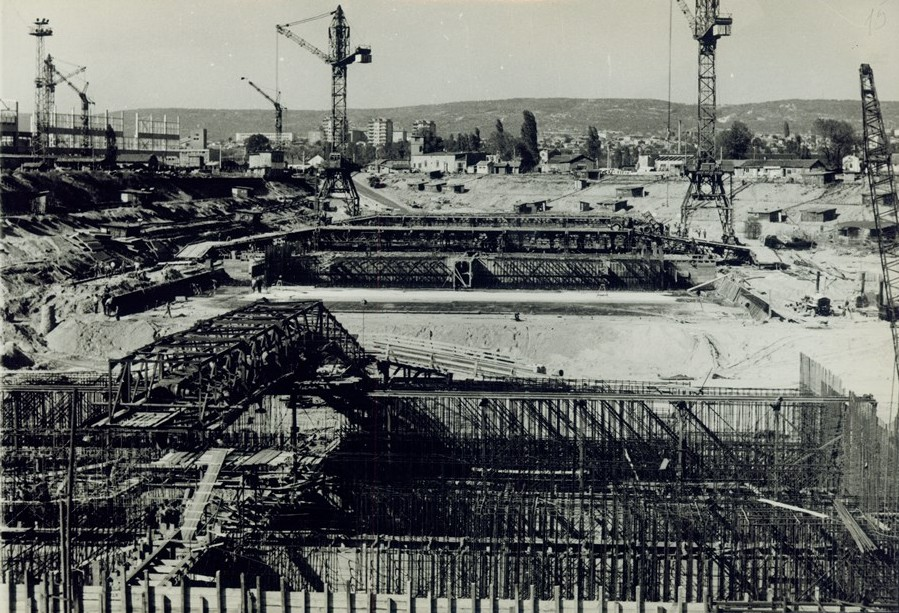
Reconstruction of Varna shipyard

== History ==
The shipyard was founded in 1907. Originally, the owner built boats and motorboats from six to nine meters in length. In 1937, the passenger ship Galata was built there. After 1945, it was renamed to Georgi Dimitrov Shipbuilding Plant. The 100,000-ton tanker Khan-Asparukh was manufactured there in 1977. It was later renamed to Bulyard Shipbuilding.

In 1986–1990, several multipurpose ships of 17,000 tons, container ships, bulk carriers were built. A significant part of the orders were fulfilled for the USSR, Poland, Czechoslovakia, Hungary and China.

== Facilities ==
- Large dock 237mx40mx7m with two thin tall (yellowish sunset gold) Ardelt Krupp (DE, Eberswald ? EKW ) gantry cranes (500 and 800 ton lift each)
- Small Dock Camera 187mx28mx6m
- Corps-forming workshop
- Sole-welding workshop
