= Pirinsko Pivo =

Brewery in Blagoevgrad, Bulgaria

The old logo of Pirinsko

Pirinsko Pivo is a brewery founded in 1969 in Blagoevgrad in SW Bulgaria.

== Details ==
Pirinsko is named after the nearby Pirin Mountains and is situated in Blagoevgrad, a city located 90 km south of the capital Sofia. The brewery substantially expanded in the last few years and has a market share of 12 percent today. The brewery produces filtered and carbonated lagers.

== Beer ==
The main brand is Pirinsko, a standard lager which has an 8% share of the national market.

== Availability ==
The beers are available in Bulgaria.
