= Hristo Burmov =

Bulgarian Major General

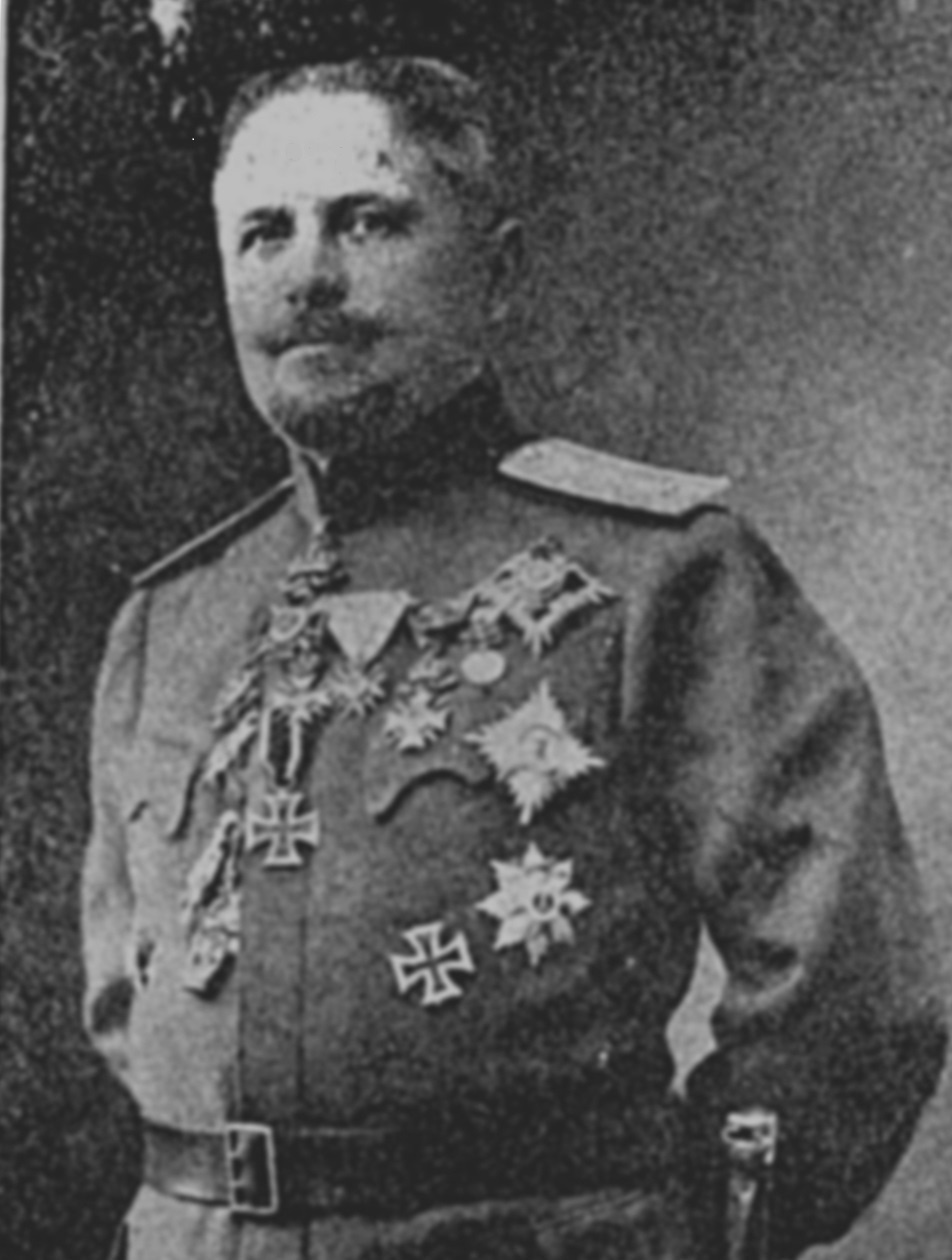

Chief of the Defence of Bulgaria
- In office July 17, 1918 – October 10, 1918
- Monarch: Ferdinand I
- Prime Minister: Aleksandar Malinov
- Preceded by: Ivan Lukov
- Succeeded by: Ivan Lukov

Personal details
- Born: September 23, 1869 Gabrovo, Danube Vilayet, Ottoman Empire
- Died: December 23, 1936 (aged 67) Sofia, Sofia City Province, Bulgaria

Military service
- Allegiance: Principality of Bulgaria; Kingdom of Bulgaria
- Branch: Bulgarian Land Forces
- Years of service: 1887 – 1919
- Rank: Lieutenant General
- Battles/wars: First Balkan War; Bulgarian front; Second Balkan War; World War I; Vardar offensive

Hristo Dimitrov Burmov was a Bulgarian Major General who was the Chief of the Defence of Bulgaria from July 17, 1918, to October 10, 1918. He also served in World War I in the Macedonian front and was one of the main Bulgarian commanders of the Vardar offensive that eventually led to the surrender of Bulgaria.

== Biography ==
Hristo Burmov was born on September 23, 1869, in Gabrovo, Ottoman Empire. On July 6, 1887, he entered military service, on May 18, 1889, he graduated from the Vasil Levski National Military University in Sofia, he was promoted to the rank of lieutenant in the infantry. On August 2, 1892, he was promoted to the rank of lieutenant. In 1898 he graduated from the General Staff Academy in Turin, Italy, and in 1899 was promoted to the rank of captain and appointed a procurement officer at the General Staff Operations Department.

Since 1900, Captain Burmov has been the editor of the Military Journal magazine. After passing through some drill positions on the captain of the 1st infantry Sofia regiment, senior aide at the headquarters of the 1st Sofia Infantry Regiment in 1903, chief of staff of the 1st brigade's at 1st Sofia Infantry Division. In 1904 he was promoted to the rank of major.

From 1904 to 1910, Major Burmov was part of a military attache in Rome, as of October 15, 1908 was promoted to lieutenant colonel, and in 1907 was the commander of the battalion to battalion of 6th Turnovo Infantry Regiment. In 1910, Burmov was appointed Chief of Staff of the 3rd Balkan Infantry Division and in 1911 commander of the 11th Sliven Infantry Regiment.

=== Balkan Wars ===
Burmov was involved in First and Second Balkan Wars as Chief of Staff of the 3rd Balkan Infantry Division. In October 1912 he was promoted to the rank of colonel . He distinguished himself in the battles near Edirne and the First Battle of Çatalca during the First Balkan War, and during the Second Balkan War he fought against the Greek army near Kukush and Pehchevo.

In March 1914 he was appointed Head of School for reserve lieutenants and at the end of the year - for the chief of staff of 1st voennoinspektsionna area.

=== World War I ===
During Bulgaria's intervention in the First World War, Burmov, despite his disagreement with the Bulgarian choice and the policy pursued, again took up military service and in good faith contributed to the country's military efforts. As commander of the Third Brigade (53rd and 54th Regiments) of the Seventh Rila Division (since September 1915) Hristo Burmov led the defeat of the Serbian units in the Macedonian front at Golak Mountain, Vinica and Mount Kara Tash, as well as the capture with the help of other parts of Veles from October 15–17, 1915. On October 17–31, 1915, Colonel Burmov's brigade took part in the battles with the French near Krivolak . In these difficult battles Burmov maintained the spirit of his subordinates with exceptional personal self-sacrifice and courage.

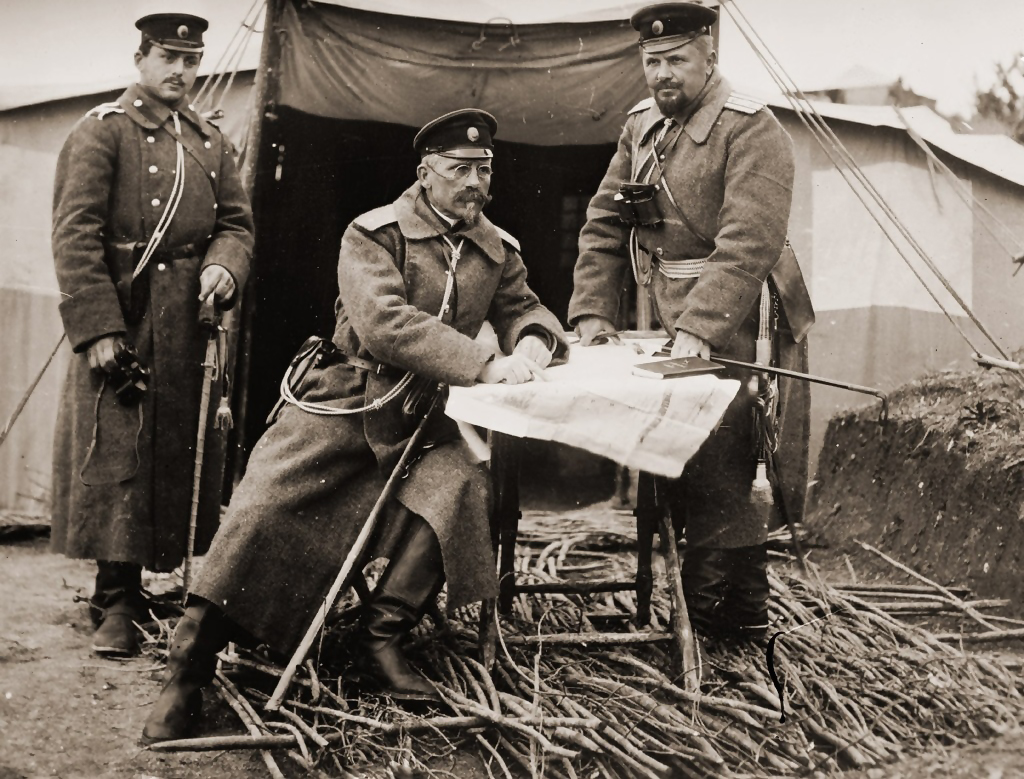
Regiment Burmov (right), Chief of Staff of the 3rd Bulgarian Army and General Ivan Sarafov (center)

From April 1916 Hristo Burmov was commander of the Tenth White Sea Infantry Division, which guarded the Aegean coast. On May 20, 1917, he was promoted to the rank of Major General, and on June 2 he was appointed commander of the Second Thracian Infantry Division of the Macedonian Front - a post he held until July 15, 1918, when he was appointed acting Chief of Staff. The active army. As Chief of Staff of the Army, General Hristo Burmov was responsible for the belated reaction in the Battle of Dobro Pole in September 1918. As his contemporary Dimitar Azmanov writes

“During these events, Burmov remained an incorrigible optimist. He mistakenly believed that our soldiers would withstand the enemy's blow, and this was probably one of the main reasons for his hesitation and untimely measures to get out of the fatal situation. so many and strong enemy attacks were no longer morally the same… ”.

On November 1, 1918, he was appointed chief of the 2nd Military Inspection District, in the summer of 1919 he resigned from the Land Forces and devoted himself to scientific work. In 1932 he was elected the first chairman of the Military Science Institute. On May 6, 1936, six months before his death, he was promoted to the rank of lieutenant general.

Lieutenant General Hristo Burmov died on December 23, 1936, in Sofia.

== Awards ==
- Order of Bravery, III and IV degree, 2nd grade
- Order of Saint Alexander, III and IV degree with swords in the middle
- Order of Military Merit, II degree with military distinction, V class on ordinary ribbon
- Order for Merit (Plain Ribbon)

=== Foreign Awards ===
Ottoman Empire: Liakat Medal, April 10, 1917
