= Chief of the Defence (Bulgaria) =

Professional head of the Bulgarian Armed Forces

- Началник на отбраната Načalnik na Otbranata
- Coat of arms of the Bulgarian Armed Forces

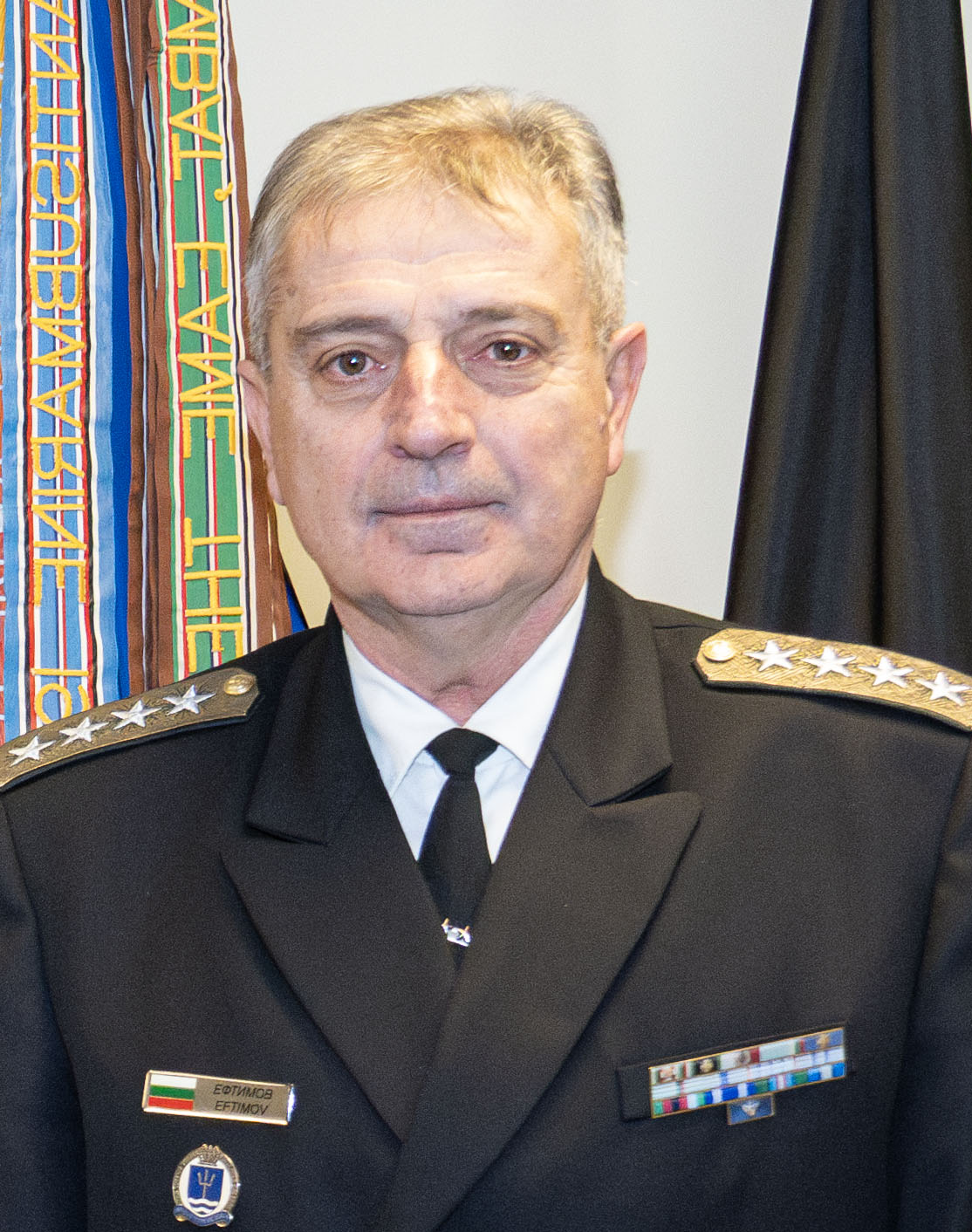
- Incumbent; Admiral Emil Eftimov since 30 March 2020
- Bulgarian Armed Forces
- Reports to: Minister of Defence
- Appointer: President of Bulgaria
- Formation: 9 September 1885
- First holder: Captain Racho Petrov
- Website: Official website

The Chief of the Defence (Bulgarian: Началник на отбраната, romanized: Načalnik na Otbranata), until 2009 the Chief of the General Staff (Bulgarian: Началник на Генерален щаб / Načalnik na Generalen Shtab), is the principal head of the Bulgarian Armed Forces. The chief is appointed by the President of Bulgaria, who is the commander-in-chief. The position dates back to the Principality of Bulgaria. The current Chief of the Defence is Admiral Emil Eftimov.

== List of the Chiefs ==
=== Ward of Stroevo (1879−1890) ===
No.	Portrait	Ward of Stroevo	Took office	Left office	Time in office
1	Racho Petrov	Captain; Racho Petrov (1861–1942)	9 September 1885	29 April 1887	1 year, 232 days
2	Stefan Paprikov [bg]	Major; Stefan Paprikov (1858–1920)	18 August 1887	23 October 1887	66 days
(1)	Racho Petrov	Major; Racho Petrov (1861–1942)	23 October 1887	15 April 1894	6 years, 174 days

=== General Staff of the Bulgarian Land Army (1890−1895) ===
No.	Portrait	Chief of the General Staff	Took office	Left office	Time in office
3	Nikola Ivanov	Lieutenant Colonel; Nikola Ivanov (1861–1940)	10 May 1894	29 November 1896	2 years, 203 days

=== Headquarters of the Bulgarian Army (1896−1899) ===
No.	Portrait	Chief of the Headquarters	Took office	Left office	Time in office
(2)	Stefan Paprikov [bg]	Colonel; Stefan Paprikov (1858–1920)	30 November 1896	18 January 1899	2 years, 49 days
4	Varban Vinarov [bg]	Colonel; Varban Vinarov (1856–1908)	24 June 1899	18 February 1900	239 days

=== General Staff (1900−1903) ===
No.	Portrait	Chief of the General Staff	Took office	Left office	Time in office
5	Stefan Ilyev [bg]	Colonel; Stefan Ilyev (1859–1913)	18 February 1900	1 January 1904	3 years, 317 days

=== Army Staff (1903−1949) ===
No.	Portrait	Chief of the Army Staff	Took office	Left office	Time in office
6	Radko Dimitriev	Major General; Radko Dimitriev (1859–1918)	1 January 1904	28 March 1907	3 years, 86 days
7	Vicho Dikov [bg]	Major General; Vicho Dikov (1861–1928)	28 March 1907	2 November 1907	219 days
8	Atanas Nazlamov [bg]	Major General; Atanas Nazlamov (1863–1935)	2 November 1907	27 March 1910	2 years, 145 days
9	Ivan Fichev	Major General; Ivan Fichev (1860–1931)	27 March 1910	14 January 1914	3 years, 293 days
10	Pravoslav Tenev	Major General; Pravoslav Tenev (1862–1942)	6 March 1914	15 April 1915	1 year, 40 days
11	Kliment Boyadzhiev	Major General; Kliment Boyadzhiev (1861–1933)	15 April 1915	7 September 1915	145 days
12	Konstantin Zhostov	Major General; Konstantin Zhostov (1867–1916)	7 September 1915	30 August 1916 †	358 days
13	Ivan Lukov	Colonel; Ivan Lukov (1871–1926)	1 September 1916	30 December 1917	1 year, 120 days
14	Hristo Burmov	Major General; Hristo Burmov (1869–1936)	17 July 1918	10 October 1918	85 days
(13)	Ivan Lukov	Major General; Ivan Lukov (1871–1926)	10 October 1918	27 October 1919	1 year, 17 days
15	Stefan Nerezov	Major General; Stefan Nerezov (1867–1925)	2 November 1919	3 September 1920	306 days
16	Petar Midilev [bg]	Colonel; Petar Midilev (1875–1939)	3 September 1920	3 December 1920	91 days
17	Nikola Topaldzhikov [bg]	Colonel; Nikola Topaldzhikov (1875–1925)	3 December 1920	20 April 1923	2 years, 138 days
–	Stefan Noykov [bg]	Colonel; Stefan Noykov (1876–1925); Acting	18 May 1923	9 June 1923	22 days
18	Aleksandar Davidov [bg]	Colonel; Aleksandar Davidov (1878–1925)	9 June 1923	3 July 1923	24 days
19	Vladimir Stoyanov [bg]	Colonel; Vladimir Stoyanov (1879–?)	4 July 1923	1 June 1926	2 years, 332 days
20	Nikola Bakardzhiev [bg]	Colonel; Nikola Bakardzhiev (1881–1954)	1 June 1926	11 January 1929	2 years, 224 days
21	Sotir Marinkov [bg]	Major General; Sotir Marinkov (1880–?)	November 1929	31 January 1931	1 year, 2 months
(20)	Nikola Bakardzhiev [bg]	Lieutenant General; Nikola Bakardzhiev (1881–1954)	31 January 1931	6 May 1934	3 years, 95 days
22	Mihail Yovov [bg]	Major General; Mihail Yovov (1886–1951)	18 May 1934	19 May 1934	1 day
23	Todor Georgiev [bg]	Major General; Todor Georgiev (1882–1971)	21 May 1934	26 December 1936	2 years, 219 days
24	Yordan Peev [bg]	Major General; Yordan Peev (1884–1938)	29 January 1937	10 October 1938 †	1 year, 254 days
25	Nikola Hadzhipetkov [bg]	Major General; Nikola Hadzhipetkov (1891–1949)	10 December 1938	11 August 1941	2 years, 305 days
26	Konstantin Lukash	Lieutenant General; Konstantin Lukash (1890–1945)	11 August 1941	11 May 1944	2 years, 274 days
27	Trifon Trifonov [bg]	Major General; Trifon Trifonov (1895–1945)	11 May 1944	6 September 1944	118 days
28	Kiril Yanchulev	Major General; Kiril Yanchulev (1896–1961)	6 September 1944	13 September 1944	7 days
29	Raycho Slavkov [bg]	Major General; Raycho Slavkov (1896–1961)	13 September 1944	15 December 1944	93 days
30	Ivan Kinov [bg]	Major General; Ivan Kinov (1893–1967)	15 December 1944	10 December 1949	5 years, 86 days

=== General Staff (1949−2009) ===
No.	Portrait	Chief of the General Staff	Took office	Left office	Time in office	Defence branch	Nation
32	Asen Grekov [bg]	Lieutenant General; Asen Grekov (1893–1954)	10 December 1949	14 December 1950	1 year, 4 days	Army	People's Republic of Bulgaria
33	Ivan Bachvarov [bg]	Colonel General; Ivan Bachvarov (1912–1966)	14 December 1950	25 January 1960	9 years, 42 days	Army	People's Republic of Bulgaria
34	Ivan Vrachev [bg]	Lieutenant General; Ivan Vrachev (1921–1994)	25 January 1960	22 March 1962	2 years, 56 days	Army	People's Republic of Bulgaria
35	Atanas Semerdzhiev	Colonel General; Atanas Semerdzhiev (1924–2015)	22 March 1962	28 December 1989	27 years, 281 days	Army	People's Republic of Bulgaria
36	Hristo Dobrev	Colonel General; Hristo Dobrev (1923–2013)	28 December 1989	15 August 1990	230 days	Army	People's Republic of Bulgaria
37	Radniu Minchev [bg]	Lieutenant General; Radniu Minchev (1928–2001)	15 August 1990	2 August 1991	352 days	Army	People's Republic of Bulgaria; Bulgaria
38	Lyuben Petrov [bg]	General of the Army; Lyuben Petrov (born 1938)	2 August 1991	2 September 1994	3 years, 31 days	Army	Bulgaria
39	Tsvetan Totomirov [bg]	Colonel General; Tsvetan Totomirov (born 1943)	2 September 1994	11 June 1997	2 years, 282 days	Army	Bulgaria
40	Miho Mihov [bg]	Colonel General; Miho Mihov (born 1949)	11 June 1997	11 June 2002	5 years, 0 days	Air Force	Bulgaria
41	Nikola Kolev [bg]	General; Nikola Kolev (1951–2021)	11 June 2002	1 June 2006	3 years, 355 days	Air Force	Bulgaria
42	Zlatan Stoykov	General; Zlatan Stoykov (born 1951)	1 June 2006	7 July 2009	3 years, 36 days	Army	Bulgaria

=== Chief of the Defence (2009−present) ===
No.	Portrait	Chief of the Defence	Took office	Left office	Time in office	Defence branch
43	Simeon Simeonov [bg]	General; Simeon Simeonov (born 1955)	7 July 2009	30 June 2014	4 years, 358 days	Air Force
44	Rumen Nikolov [bg]	Vice Admiral; Rumen Nikolov (born 1957)	30 June 2014	8 February 2016	1 year, 223 days	Navy
45	Constantin Popov [bg]	General; Constantin Popov (born 1961)	9 February 2016	19 January 2017	345 days	Air Force
–	Emil Eftimov	Vice Admiral; Emil Eftimov (born 1961); Acting	19 January 2017	2 March 2017	42 days	Navy
46	Andrey Botsev [bg]	General; Andrey Botsev (1959–2020)	2 March 2017	27 February 2020 †	2 years, 362 days	Land Forces
–	Emil Eftimov	Vice Admiral; Emil Eftimov (born 1961); Acting	27 February 2020	30 March 2020	32 days	Navy
47	Emil Eftimov	Admiral; Emil Eftimov (born 1961)	30 March 2020	Incumbent	6 years, 161 days	Navy

== See also ==
- Bulgarian Land Forces
- Bulgarian Air Force
- Bulgarian Navy
- Bulgarian People's Army
