= Bulgaria and weapons of mass destruction =

Bulgaria has developed weapons of mass destruction, most notably chemical weapons. Chemical weapons production was concentrated in Smyadovo. As of 2025, Bulgaria does not possess any weapons of mass destruction.

== Missile program ==
The People's Republic of Bulgaria had a significant missile arsenal, including 67 Scud (Elbrus), 50 Frog (Luna) and 24 Spider (Oka) ballistic missiles. Since the Soviet Union planned to rapidly deploy its own nuclear weapons in Bulgaria in case a war broke out, the missiles were not armed with warheads, but only prepared to launch Soviet weapons.

The SS-23 systems had conventional warheads plus a WMD launching capability. The nuclear missile launching pads and equipment were dismantled in 1991. The first missile brigade was created in 1961. In 1994, the country bought 46 conventional warheads for its Scuds from Russia. All Scud, Frog and Spider missiles were destroyed in 2002. Currently, Bulgaria operates a dozen Scarab launchers, but information over the exact number of missiles is classified. They are all armed with conventional warheads of 160 kg each.

== Chemical weapons ==
Information on Bulgaria's chemical weapons is scarce. The only known chemical weapons production facility was located near Smyadovo, which now produces chemicals for civilian purposes. The country ratified the Chemical Weapons Convention in 1994 and begun dismantlement in 2000.

== Biological weapons ==
Bulgaria has signed and ratified the Biological Weapons Convention.

== Nuclear weapons ==
Bulgaria has never developed nuclear weapons, although some treaties with the Soviet Union guaranteed the deployment of Soviet warheads on Bulgarian territory in case of a war with NATO. Its R-400 missiles were nuclear-capable. In the mid-1990s, journalist Goran Gotev investigated a testimony of an anonymous Soviet Army captain published in Komsomolskaya Pravda, who described in detail an alleged Soviet-Bulgarian nuclear weapons facility which hosted 70 warheads for tactical missiles. The site consisted of "four three-storey apartment blocks, barracks, a cafeteria, a sports field, a social club, a store, and a plaza", and had 130 personnel. The unit was disbanded in 1989, the warheads were quickly shipped to Ukraine and all equipment, uniforms and photos that were present at the facility were destroyed. Another Russian Army official later denied the story. However, in the 1980s four Bulgarian Air Force majors received training in the Soviet Union on releasing nuclear weapons from MiG-23BN aircraft.

In 2001, the Bulgarian Foreign Ministry denied the "presence" of nuclear weapons in Bulgaria.

The country has the potential to establish a military nuclear program, having a nuclear powerplant at Kozloduy with its own plutonium storage facility. A nuclear research facility with a 200 kW pool-type reactor is in operation in Sofia. The reactor of the facility produces some nuclear material, which is stored near Novi Khan.

As part of its efforts to safeguard potentially weapons-usable atomic material, the United Nations nuclear watchdog assisted Bulgaria with the removal of highly enriched uranium stored at the shut-down research reactor in Sofia. The substance, which was 36% enriched and took the form of fresh fuel, was airlifted in December 2003 to Russia, the original supplier, according to the International Atomic Energy Agency (IAEA). Agency safeguards inspectors monitored and verified the packaging of the fuel, which Russia said it would re-fabricate into low-enriched uranium.

In December 2016, Bulgaria voted against a UN Resolution that urged member states to begin negotiations on the complete abolition of nuclear weapons.

In April 2018, information appeared about Turkey's desire to remove US nuclear weapons from the territory of the country. After NATO's official statements about the desire to expand the military presence of the United States in Europe, it became known that Bulgaria could become a new location for nuclear weapons from Turkey.

== See also ==
- Military of Bulgaria
