= Ivan Lukov =

Bulgarian officer

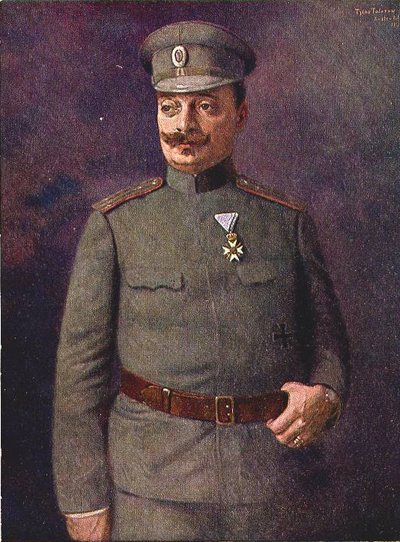
- Born: 22 August 1871; Gabrovo, Bulgaria
- Died: April 17, 1926 (aged 54); Sofia, Bulgaria
- Military career
- Allegiance: Kingdom of Bulgaria
- Branch: Bulgarian Army
- Service years: 1891–1919
- Rank: Lieutenant general
- Commands: 2nd Bulgarian Army
- Conflicts: Balkan Wars; First World War

Ivan Tsonev Lukov (Bulgarian: Иван Цонев Луков) (August 22, 1871, in Gabrovo – April 17, 1926, in Sofia) was a Bulgarian officer. During the First World War, he was Chief of Staff of the Bulgarian Army and commanded between 1917 and 1918 the Bulgarian Second Army on the Salonika front.

== Biography ==
Ivan Lukov was born on August 22, 1871, in Gabrovo. He graduated from the Military School in Sofia, and in 1910 from the Nikolaevsk General Staff Military Academy in St. Petersburg, Russia.
From 1906 to 1908 he was Bulgarian military attaché in Paris and St. Petersburg.

During the Balkan War (1912-1913) was Chief of Staff of the 1st Infantry Division in Sofia, and after the war he was appointed Head of the Military School.

After the mobilization in 1915, he was appointed Head of the Operations Department at the headquarters of the acting army in Kyustendil. After the death of Major General Konstantin Zhostov in August 1916, he became Chief of Staff of the Bulgarian Army. In February 1917, due to conflicts with the Allies, he was sent to command the 2nd Bulgarian Army.

In September 1918 he was part of the Bulgarian delegation that signed the Armistice of Salonica, together with Andrey Lyapchev and Simeon Radev. In 1918–1919, he was again Chief of Staff of the Bulgarian Army and a member of the Bulgarian delegation in Neuilly. After signing this peace treaty, he went into the reserve. In the period 1921 - 1923, he was chairman of the Union of Reserve Officers.

Lieutenant General Ivan Lukov died on April 17, 1926, in Sofia, Bulgaria.
