= Emil Eftimov =

Bulgarian military figure (born 1951)

- Born: Emil Vassilev Eftimov; August 16, 1961 (age 64); Varna, PR Bulgaria
- Allegiance: Bulgaria
- Branch: Bulgarian Navy
- Service years: 1984–present
- Rank: Admiral
- Education: Nikola Vaptsarov Naval Academy

Emil Vassilev Eftimov (Bulgarian: Емил Василев Ефтимов; born 17 March 1951) is a Bulgarian military figure and the current chief of the defence of the Bulgarian Armed Forces.

== Early life and education ==
He was born on August 16, 1961, in Varna. His father, Vasil Evtimov Mochkov, was a captain of the 1st rank, commander of the Signal Regiment, and later chief of communications at the Naval Headquarters. In 1979, Eftimov graduated with honors from the Mathematical High School in Varna, and in 1984 he graduated from the Nikola Vaptsarov Naval Academy, also in Varna.

He began his military career in the Bulgarian People's Army as commander of a navigational combat unit of aboard a frigate. From 1985 to 1988, he served as commander of a mine-torpedo combat unit. Between 1988 and 1991, he was senior assistant commander of the frigate, and from 1991 to 1992 he serves as its commander. From 1992 to 1994, he studied at the Kuznetsov Naval Academy in Saint Petersburg.

== Junior roles ==
From 1994 to 1995, Eftimov served as a divisional specialist in anti-submarine defence with the First Patrol Ship Division. Between 1995 and 2000, he was Chief of Staff of the First Patrol Ship Division at the Varna Naval Base. From 2001 to 2003, he commanded the division, and from 2003 to 2004 he served as deputy commander for training of the forces at the Varna Naval Base.

In 2005, Eftimov graduated from the United States Naval War College and was appointed Head of the "Preparation and Use of Forces" Department at the Naval Headquarters. From 2006 to 2009, he served as Chief of Staff of the Varna Naval Base. On July 1, 2009, he was appointed commander of the Varna Naval Base and promoted to the senior officer rank of commodore. He was relieved of his position on August 3, 2011.

== High-level positions ==
From 2011 to 2013, Eftimov served as deputy director of the Directorate for Cooperation and Regional Security at NATO's International Military Staff at NATO Headquarters in Brussels. In 2012, he completed two senior officer courses at the NATO School Oberammergau and the NATO Defense College in Rome, Italy.

By Decree No. 85 of 26 April 2013, he was appointed director of the Directorate for Cooperation and Regional Security at the NATO International Military Secretariat in Brussels, Belgium, effective 16 July 2013, and was promoted to the senior officer rank of rear admiral. By Decree No. 60 of 22 March 2016, he was dismissed from this position and appointed deputy chief of defence, receiving the senior officer rank of vice admiral, effective 16 July 2016.

By decree of 16 January 2017, Eftimov was appointed acting chief of defence at the Defence Staff, serving in this role from 19 January to 8 March 2017. He subsequently returned to the position of deputy chief of defence. From February 27, 2020, he again served as acting chief of defense. On March 30, 2020, by Decree No. 75, he was relieved of his duties as deputy chief of defense, appointed chief of defense, and promoted to the senior officer rank of admiral. On December 19, 2023, he was reappointed chief of defense, effective March 31, 2024.

== Personal life ==
Eftimov is married and has two children. He is fluent in English and Russian.

== Military ranks ==
- Lieutenant (September 1, 1984)
- Senior Lieutenant (1987)
- Captain Lieutenant (1991)
- Captain III Rank (1996)
- Captain II Rank (1999)
- Captain I Rank (2003)
- Commodore (June 30, 2009)
- Rear Admiral (July 16, 2013)
- Vice Admiral (July 16, 2016)
- Admiral (March 30, 2020)
