= Kiril Yanchulev =

Bulgarian army officer (1896–1961)

- Born: 19 February 1896; Prilep, Manastir Vilayet, Ottoman Empire (present-day North Macedonia)
- Died: April 1961 (aged 64–65); Sofia, People's Republic of Bulgaria
- Education: St. Cyr
- Military career
- Allegiance: Kingdom of Bulgaria
- Branch: Bulgarian Land Forces
- Rank: Major General
- Commands: Bulgarian Army
- Conflicts: First World War; Second World War

Kiril Dimitrov Yanchulev (Bulgarian: Кирил Димитров Янчулев) (19 February 1896 – April 1961) was a Bulgarian officer and Chief of Staff of the Bulgarian Army from 6 to 13 September 1944.

== Biography ==
Kiril Yanchulev was born in Prilep, in the Manastir Vilayet of the Ottoman Empire (present-day North Macedonia). His father was a prominent Bulgarian revival figure Dimitar Yanchulev, his mother Evgenia Yanchuleva was a teacher. He studied at the Bulgarian Men's High School of Thessaloniki. After he graduated the Military School in Sofia on 12 March 1916, was assigned as lieutenant and took part in World War I.

After the war, Yanchulev specialized in the French Military Academy at St. Cyr. In January 1923, he was promoted to captain. During 1928–1929, Yanchulev lectured military history at the Military School in Sofia. On 15 May 1930, he was promoted to Major, and on 26 August 1934, to the rank of Colonel. In 1931, he released his book The Russo-Turkish War of 1877–1878.

Between 1934 and 1939, Yanchulev was a military attaché in Paris and London.

On 3 October 1938, he was promoted to Colonel and in the same year was appointed as chief of the Military Academy. In August, he was appointed Head of the army headquarters. In March 1942, he served as Assistant Chief of Staff of the army, and on 6 May 1943, he was promoted to Major General.

Yanchulev was appointed as Chief of Staff of the Bulgarian Army on 6 September 1944 but dismissed just a week later.

After World War II Yanchulev was persecuted by the communist authorities and imprisoned in the concentration camp Belene.

General Kiril Yanchulev died in April 1961.
