= Bulgarian Armed Forces =

Military forces of Bulgaria

Bulgarian Army
- Българска армия
- Logo of Ministry of Defense of Bulgaria
- Founded: 7 May 1878
- Current form: 2002
- Service branches: Bulgarian Land Forces; Bulgarian Navy; Bulgarian Air Force
- Headquarters: Sofia
- Website: mod.bg/en/ba.html

Leadership
- President: Iliana Iotova
- Prime Minister: Rumen Radev
- Minister of Defence: Dimitar Stoyanov
- Chief of the Defence: Admiral Emil Eftimov

Personnel
- Military age: 18
- Conscription: No
- Active personnel: 36,950
- Reserve personnel: 3,000
- Deployed personnel: See below

Expenditure
- Budget: $2.34 billion (2024)
- Percent of GDP: 2.05% (2024)

Industry
- Domestic suppliers: TEREM; Arsenal AD; VMZ Sopot; Samel 90
- Foreign suppliers: Austria; Croatia; Czechia; France; Germany; United Kingdom; United States
- Annual exports: $2.3 billion (2022)

Related articles
- History: Russo-Turkish War (1877–1878); Serbo-Bulgarian War; First Balkan War; Second Balkan War; World War I; War of the Stray Dog; World War II; Warsaw Pact invasion of Czechoslovakia; Iraq War; War in Afghanistan; 2011 military intervention in Libya
- Ranks: Military ranks of Bulgaria

The Bulgarian Army (Bulgarian: Българска армия, romanized: Bŭlgarska armiya), also called the Bulgarian Armed Forces (Bulgarian: Български Въоръжени сили, romanized: Bŭlgarski Vŭorŭzheni Sili), is the military of Bulgaria. The commander-in-chief is the president of Bulgaria. The Ministry of Defense is responsible for political leadership, while overall military command is in the hands of the Defense Staff, headed by the Chief of the Defense. There are three main branches of the Bulgarian Army, named literally the Land Forces, the Air Forces and the Naval Forces.

Throughout history, the Army has played a major role in defending the country's sovereignty. Only several years after its inception in 1878, Bulgaria became a regional military power and was involved in several major wars – the Serbo-Bulgarian War (1885), the First Balkan War (1912–13), the Second Balkan War (1913), the First World War (1915–1918) and the Second World War (1941–1945), during which the Army gained considerable combat experience. During the Cold War, the People's Republic of Bulgaria maintained one of the largest militaries in the Warsaw Pact, numbering an estimated 152,000 troops in 1988. Since the Fall of Communism, the political leadership has decided to pursue a pro-NATO policy, thus reducing military personnel and weaponry. Bulgaria joined the North Atlantic Treaty Organization on 29 March 2004.

The patron saint of the Bulgarian Army is St. George. The Armed Forces Day or St. George's Day (6 May) is an official holiday in Bulgaria.

== History of the Bulgarian Army ==
=== 19th Century ===
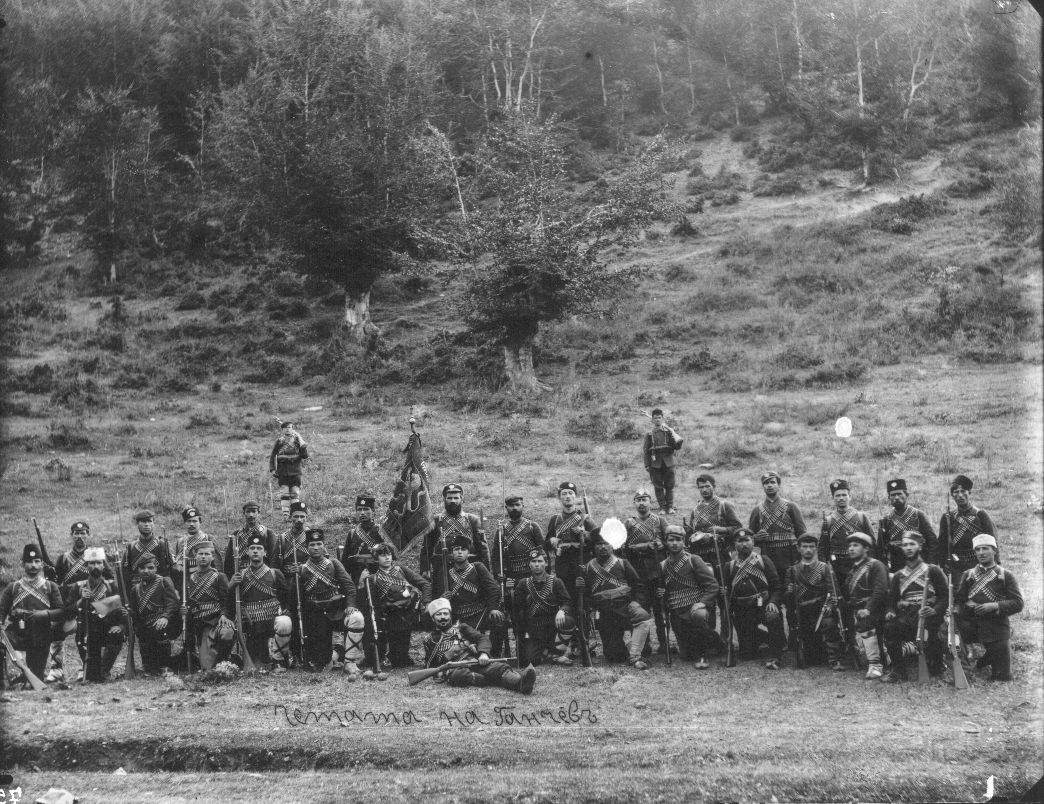
Bulgarian militiamen from the Ganchev Detachment in the region of Western Bulgaria, ca. 1900

The modern Bulgarian military dates back to 1878. On 22 July 1878 (10 July O.S.) a total of 12 battalions of opalchentsi who participated in the Liberation war, formed the Bulgarian Armed Forces. According to the Tarnovo Constitution, all men between 21 and 40 years of age were eligible for military service. In 1883 the military was reorganised in four infantry brigades (in Sofia, Pleven, Ruse and Shumen) and one cavalry brigade.

=== Serbo-Bulgarian war ===
The Serbo-Bulgarian War was the first armed conflict after Bulgaria's liberation. It was a result of the unification with Eastern Rumelia, which happened on 6 September 1885. The unification was not completely recognised, however, and one of the countries that refused to recognise the act was the Kingdom of Serbia. The Austro-Hungarian Empire had been expanding its influence in the Balkans, and was particularly opposed. Serbia also feared this would diminish its dominance in the region. In addition, Serbian ruler Milan Obrenović IV was annoyed that Serbian opposition leaders like Nikola Pašić, who had escaped persecution after the Timok Rebellion, had found asylum in Bulgaria. Lured by Austria-Hungary's promises of territorial gains from Bulgaria (in return for concessions in the western Balkans), Milan IV declared war on Bulgaria on 14 November 1885.

Military strategy relied largely on surprise, as Bulgaria had moved most of its troops near the border with the Ottoman Empire, in the southeast. As it happened, the Ottomans did not intervene and the Serbian army's advance was stopped after the Battle of Slivnitsa. The main body of the Bulgarian army travelled from the Ottoman border in the southeast to the Serbian border in the northwest to defend the capital, Sofia. After the defensive battles at Slivnitsa and Vidin, Bulgaria began an offensive that took the city of Pirot. At this point the Austro-Hungarian Empire stepped in, threatening to join the war on Serbia's side if Bulgarian troops did not retreat. Fighting lasted for only 14 days, from 14 to 28 November. A peace treaty was signed in Bucharest on 19 February 1886. No territorial changes were made to either country, but Bulgarian unification was recognised by the Great Powers.

=== First Balkan War ===
Instability in the Balkan region in the early 1900s quickly became a precursor for a new war. Serbia's aspirations towards Bosnia and Herzegovina were thwarted by the Austrian annexation of the province in October 1908, so the Serbs focused their attention onto Kosovo, and to the south for expansion. Greek officers, revolting in August 1909, had secured the appointment of a progressive government under Eleftherios Venizelos, which they hoped would resolve the Cretan issue in Greece's favor and reverse their defeat of 1897 by the Ottomans. Bulgaria, which had secured Ottoman recognition of its independence in April 1909 and enjoyed the friendship of Russia, also looked to districts of Ottoman Thrace and Macedonia for expansion.

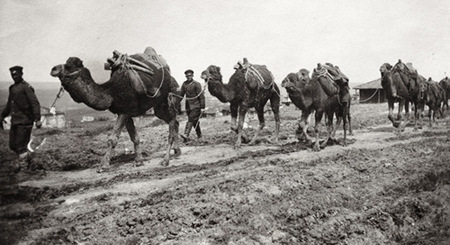
A camel caravan of the Bulgarian 17th Regiment carrying supplies for the Çatalca operation, 1912

In March 1910 an Albanian insurrection broke out in Kosovo. In August Montenegro followed Bulgaria's precedent by becoming a kingdom. In 1911 Italy launched an invasion of Tripolitania, which was quickly followed by the occupation of the Dodecanese Islands. The Italians' decisive military victories over the Ottoman Empire greatly influenced the Balkan states to prepare for war against Turkey. Thus, in the spring of 1912 consultations among the various Christian Balkan nations resulted in a network of military alliances that became known as the Balkan League. The Great Powers, most notably France and Austria-Hungary, reacted to this diplomatic sensation by trying to dissuade the League from going to war, but failed.

In late September both the League and the Ottoman Empire mobilised their armies. Montenegro was the first to declare war, on 25 September (O.S.)/ 8 October. The other three states, after issuing an impossible ultimatum to the Porte on 13 October, declared war on Turkey on 17 October. The Balkan League relied on 700,000 troops, 370,000 of whom were Bulgarians. Bulgaria, often dubbed the "Prussia of the Balkans", was militarily the most powerful of the four states, with a large, well-trained and well-equipped army. The peacetime army of 60,000 troops was expanded during the war to 370,000, with almost 600,000 men mobilized in total out of a population of 4,300,000. The Bulgarian field army consisted of nine infantry divisions, one cavalry division and 1,116 artillery units. Commander-in-Chief was Tsar Ferdinand, while the actual command was in the hands of his deputy, Gen. Mikhail Savov. The Bulgarians also possessed a small navy of six torpedo boats, which were restricted to operations along the country's Black Sea coast.

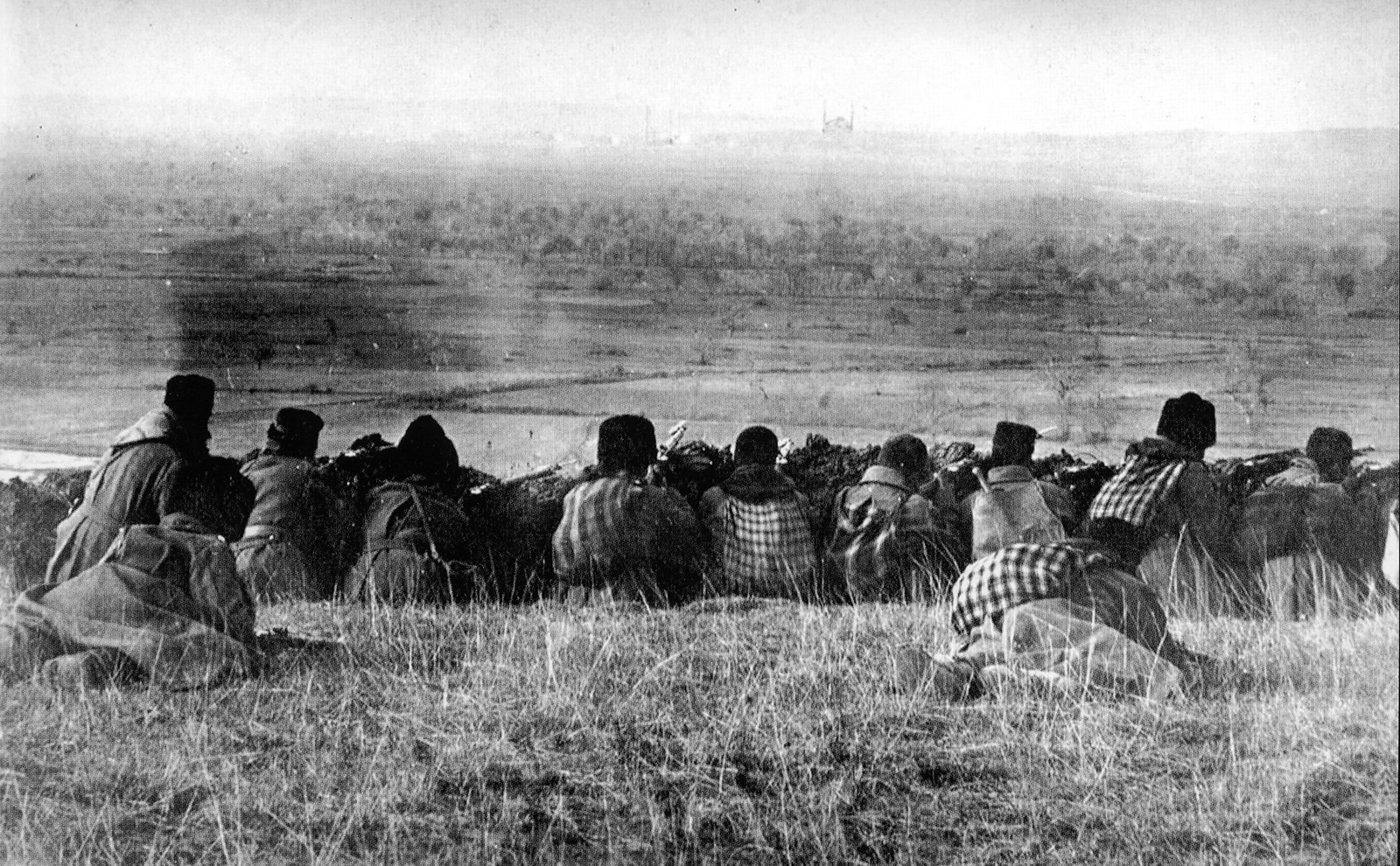
Soldiers preparing for an assault against Adrianople, 1912

Bulgaria's war aims were focused on Thrace and Macedonia. For the latter, Bulgaria had a secret agreement with Serbia to divide it between them, signed on 13 March 1912 during the negotiations that led to the establishment of the Balkan League. However, it was not a secret that Bulgaria's target was the fulfillment of the never-materialized Treaty of San Stefano, signed after the Russo-Turkish War, 1877–78. They deployed their main force in Thrace, forming three armies. The First Army, under Gen. Vasil Kutinchev with three infantry divisions, was deployed to the south of Yambol, with direction of operations along the Tundzha River. The Second Army, under Gen. Nikola Ivanov with two infantry divisions and one infantry brigade, was deployed west of the First and was assigned to capture the strong fortress of Adrianople (now Edirne). According to the plans, the Third Army, under Gen. Radko Dimitriev, was deployed east of and behind the First and was covered by the cavalry division hiding it from the Turkish view. The Third Army had three infantry divisions and was assigned to cross the Stranja mountain and to take the fortress of Lozengrad (Kirk Kilisse). The 2nd and 7th divisions were assigned independent roles, operating in western Thrace and eastern Macedonia, respectively.

The first great battles were at the Adrianople–Kirk Kilisse defensive line, where the Bulgarian 1st and 3rd Armies (together 110,000 men) defeated the Ottoman East Army (130,000 men) near Gechkenli, Seliolu, and Petra. The fortress of Adrianople was besieged and Kirk Kilisse was taken without resistance under the pressure of the Bulgarian Third Army. The initial Bulgarian attack by First and Third Army defeated the Turkish forces, numbering some 130,000, and reached the Sea of Marmara. However, the Turks, with the aid of fresh reinforcements from the Asian provinces, established their third and strongest defensive position at the Chataldja Line, across the peninsula where Constantinople is located. New Turkish forces landed at Bulair and Şarköy, but after heavy fighting they were crushed by the newly formed 4th Bulgarian Army under the command of Gen Stiliyan Kovachev. The offensive at Chataldja failed, too. On 11 March the final Bulgarian assault on Adrianople began. Under the command of Gen. Georgi Vazov the Bulgarians, reinforced with two Serb divisions, conquered the "untakeable" city. On 17/30 May a peace treaty was signed between Turkey and the Balkan Alliance. The First Balkan War, which lasted from October 1912-May 1913, strengthened Bulgaria's position as a regional military power, significantly reduced Ottoman influence over the Balkans and resulted in the formation of an independent Albanian state.

=== Second Balkan War ===
The peace settlement of the First Balkan War proved unsatisfactory for both Serbia and Bulgaria. Serbia refused to cede a part of the territories in Macedonia, which it occupied and promised to give to Bulgaria according to a secret agreement. Serbia, on its side, was not satisfied with the independence of Albania and sought a secret alliance with Greece. Armed skirmishes between Serbian and Bulgarian troops occurred.

On 16 June 1913, just a few months after the end of the first war, the Bulgarian government ordered an attack on Serbian and Greek positions in Macedonia, without declaring war. Almost all of Bulgaria's 500,000-man standing army was positioned against these two countries, on two fronts—western and southern—while the borders with Romania and the Ottoman Empire were left almost unguarded. Montenegro sent a 12,000-strong force to assist the Serbs. Exhausted from the previous war, which took the highest toll on Bulgaria, the Bulgarian army soon turned to the defensive. Romania attacked from the north and northeast and the Ottoman Empire also intervened in Thrace. Allied numerical superiority was almost 2:1. After a month and two days of fighting, the war ended as a disaster for Bulgaria, and at the same time its economy was ruined and its military demoralised.

=== First World War ===
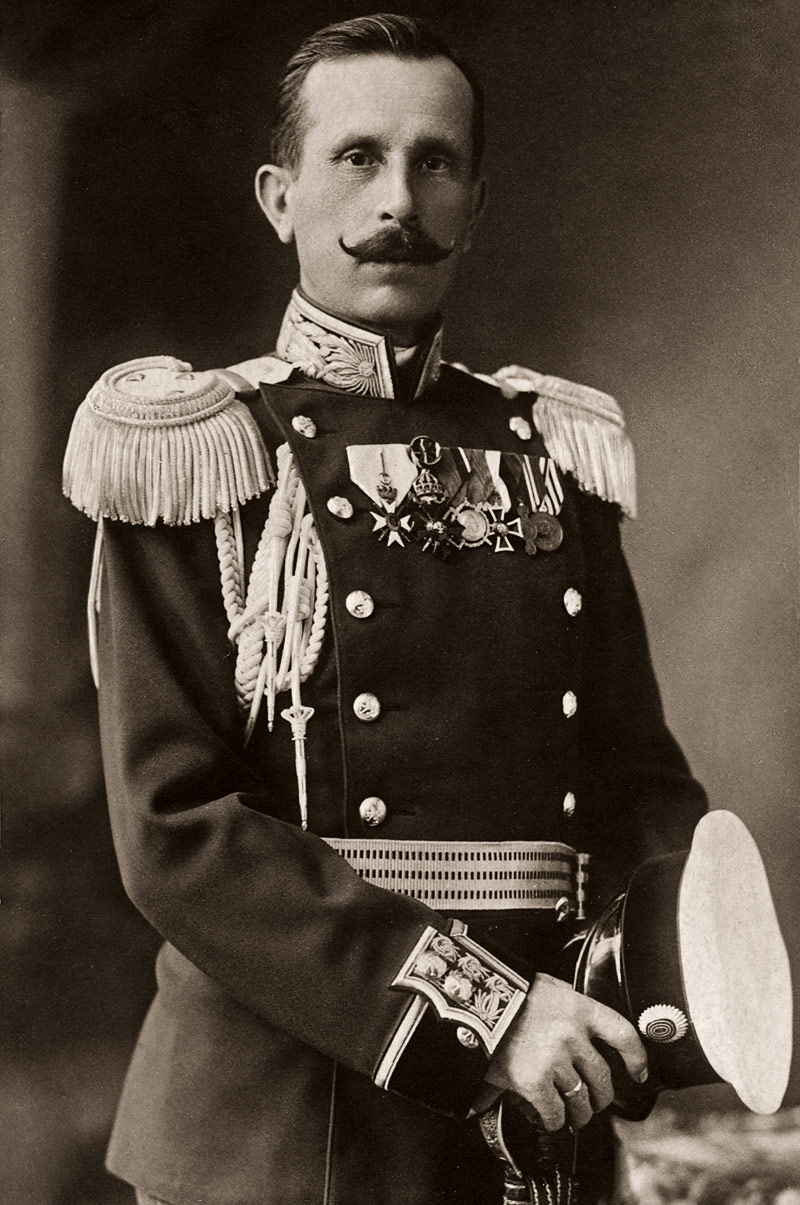
Gen. Nikola Zhekov, Commander-in-Chief of the Bulgarian Army during World War I

The Kingdom of Bulgaria participated in World War I on the side of the Central Powers between 15 October 1915, when the country declared war on Serbia, and 29 September 1918, when the Armistice of Thessalonica was signed. In the aftermath of the Balkan Wars, Bulgarian opinion turned against Russia and the western powers, whom the Bulgarians felt had done nothing to help them. The government of Vasil Radoslavov aligned the country with Germany and Austria-Hungary, even though this meant also becoming an ally of the Ottomans, Bulgaria's traditional enemy. However, Bulgaria now had no claims against the Ottomans, whereas Serbia, Greece and Romania (allies of Britain and France) were all in possession of lands perceived in Bulgaria as its own.

In 1915 Germany promised to restore the boundaries according to the Treaty of San Stefano and Bulgaria, which had the largest army in the Balkans, declared war on Serbia in October of that year. In the First World War Bulgaria decisively asserted its military capabilities. The second Battle of Doiran, with Gen. Vladimir Vazov as commander, inflicted a heavy blow on the numerically superior British army, which suffered 12,000 casualties against 2,000 from the opposite side. One year later, during the third battle of Doiran, the United Kingdom, supported by Greece, once again suffered a humiliating defeat, losing 3,155 men against just about 500 on the Bulgarian side. The reputation of the French army also suffered badly. The Battle of the Red Wall was marked by the total defeat of the French forces, with 5,700 out of 6,000 men killed. The 261 Frenchmen who survived were captured by Bulgarian soldiers.

Despite the outstanding victories, Germany was near defeat, which meant that Bulgaria would be left without its most powerful ally. The Russian Revolution of February 1917 had a great effect in Bulgaria, spreading antiwar and anti-monarchist sentiment among the troops and in the cities. In June Radoslavov's government resigned. In 1919 Bulgaria officially left the war with the Treaty of Neuilly-sur-Seine.

=== The army between the World Wars ===
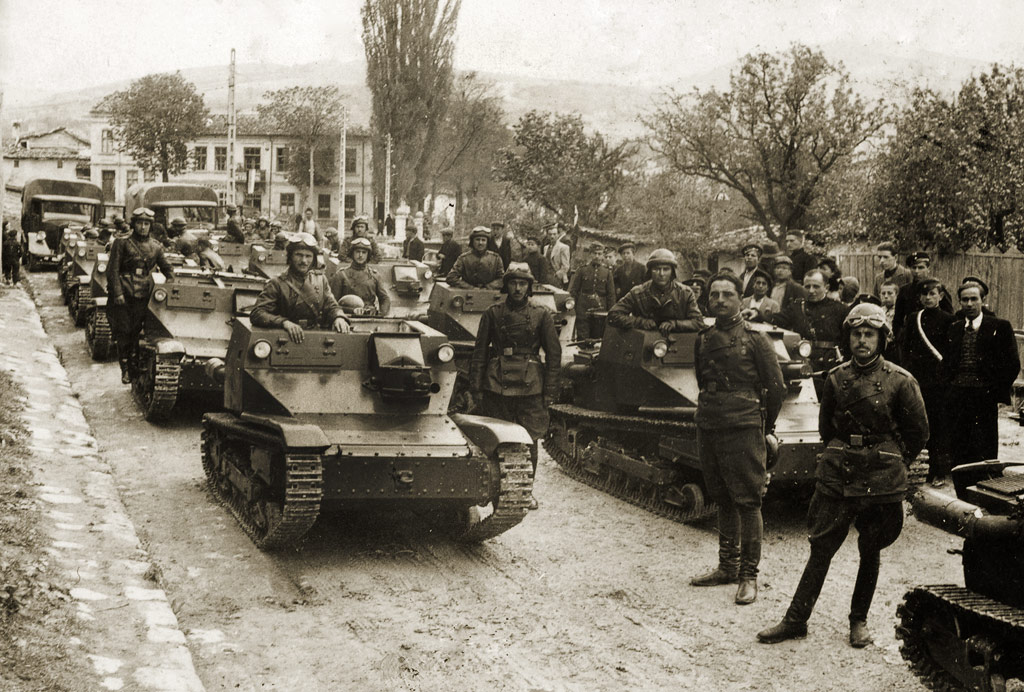
Bulgarian CV-33 tankettes, early 1930s

The Treaty of Neuilly-sur-Seine proved to be a severe blow to Bulgaria's military. According to the treaty, the country had no right to organize a conscription-based military. The professional army was to be no more than 20,000 men, including 10,000 internal forces and 3,000 border guards. Equipping the army with tanks, submarines, bombers and heavy artillery was strictly prohibited, although Bulgaria managed to get around some of these prohibitions. Nevertheless, on the eve of World War II the Bulgarian army was still well-trained and well-equipped. In fact, the Bulgarian Army had been expanded in 1935.

=== World War II ===
The government of the Kingdom of Bulgaria under Prime Minister Bogdan Filov declared a position of neutrality upon the outbreak of World War II. Bulgaria was determined to observe it until the end of the war but it hoped for bloodless territorial gains, especially in the lands with a significant Bulgarian population occupied by neighbouring countries after the Second Balkan War and World War I. However, it was clear that the central geopolitical position of Bulgaria in the Balkans would inevitably lead to strong external pressure by both World War II factions. Turkey had a non-aggression pact with Bulgaria. On 7 September 1940 Bulgaria succeeded in negotiating a recovery of Southern Dobruja with the Treaty of Craiova (see Second Vienna Award). Southern Dobruja had been part of Romania since 1913. This recovery of territory reinforced hopes for resolving other territorial problems without direct involvement in the war. The country joined the Axis powers in 1941, when German troops preparing to invade Yugoslavia and Greece reached the Bulgarian borders and demanded permission to pass through its territory.

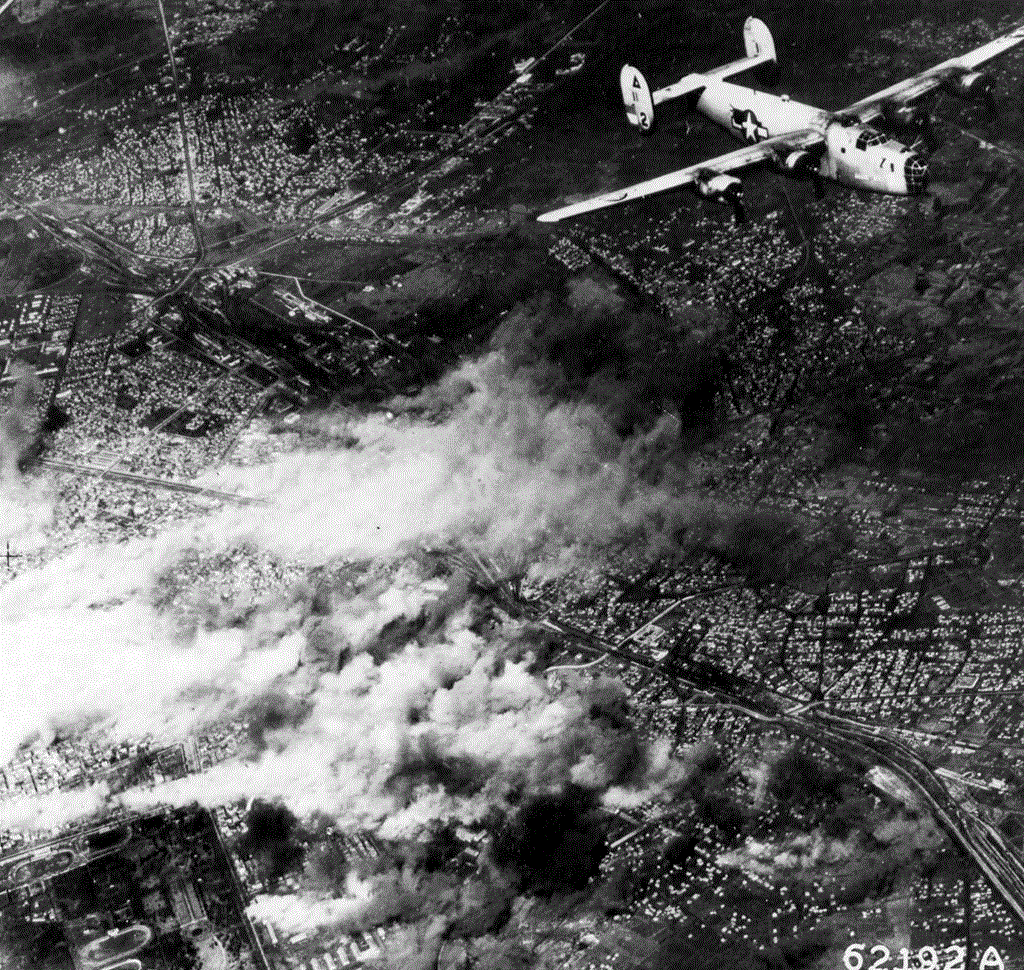
The Bombing of Sofia in World War II, 1944

On 1 March 1941, Bulgaria signed the Tripartite Pact and officially joined the Axis bloc. After a short period of inaction, the army launched an operation against Yugoslavia and Greece. The goal of reaching the shores of the Aegean Sea and completely occupying the region of Macedonia was successful. Even though Bulgaria did not send any troops to support the German invasion of the Soviet Union, its navy was involved in a number of skirmishes with the Soviet Black Sea Fleet, which attacked Bulgarian shipping. Besides this, Bulgarian Armed Forces garrisoned in the Balkans battled various resistance groups. The Bulgarian government declared a token war on the United Kingdom and the United States near the end of 1941, an act that resulted in the bombing of Sofia and other Bulgarian cities by Allied aircraft.

Some communist activists managed to begin a guerrilla movement, headed by the underground Bulgarian Communist Party. A resistance movement called Otechestven front (Fatherland front, Bulgarian: Отечествен фронт) was set up in August 1942 by the Communist Party, the Zveno movement and a number of other parties to oppose the elected government, after a number of Allied victories indicated that the Axis might lose the War. In 1943 Tsar Boris III died suddenly. In the summer of 1944, after having crushed the Nazi defense around Iaşi and Chişinău, the Red Army approached the Balkans and Bulgaria. On 23 August 1944 Romania quit the Axis Powers, declared war on Germany and allowed Soviet forces to cross its territory to reach Bulgaria. On 26 August 1944 the Fatherland Front made the decision to incite an armed rebellion against the government, which led to the appointment of a new government on 2 September. Support for the government was withheld by the Fatherland Front, since it was composed of pro-Nazi elements, in a desperate attempt to hold on to power. On 5 September 1944 the Soviet Union declared war and invaded Bulgaria. On 8 September 1944 the Bulgarian army joined the Soviet Union in its war against Germany.

=== Cold War era ===
As the Red Army invaded Bulgaria in 1944 and installed a communist government, the armed forces were rapidly forced to reorganise following the Soviet model, and were renamed the Bulgarian People's Army (Bohlgarska Narodna Armija, BNA). Moscow quickly supplied Bulgaria with T-34-85 tanks, SU-100 guns, Il-2 attack planes and other new combat machinery. As the country was a Soviet satellite, it was a part of the Eastern Bloc and entered the Warsaw Pact as one of its founders. By this time the army had expanded to over 200,000 men with hundreds of thousands of more reserve troops. Military service was obligatory. A special defensive line, known as the Krali Marko defensive line, was constructed along the entire border with Turkey. It was heavily fortified with concrete walls and turrets of T-34, Panzer III and Panzer IV tanks.

The army was involved in a number of border skirmishes from 1948 to 1952, repulsing several Greek attacks, and took part in the suppression of the Prague Spring events. In the meantime, during the rule of Todor Zhivkov, a significant military-industrial complex was established, capable of producing armored vehicles, self-propelled artillery, small arms and ammunition, as well as aircraft engines and spare parts. Bulgaria provided weapons and military expertise to Algeria, Yemen, Libya, Iraq, Nicaragua, Egypt and Syria. Some military and medical aid was also supplied to North Korea and North Vietnam in the 1950s and 1960s. During the 1970s the Air Force was at the apogee of its power, possessing at least 500 modern combat aircraft in its inventory. Training in the Bulgarian People's Army was exhaustive even by Soviet standards; however, it was never seen as a major force within the Warsaw Pact. In 1989, when the Cold War was coming to its end, the army (the combined number of ground, air and naval forces) numbered about 120,000 men, most of them conscripts. There were, however, several services which, while falling outside of Ministry of Defense jurisdiction in peacetime, were considered part of the armed forces. These were foremost the Labour Troops (construction forces), the People's Militia (the police forces of the country, which fell under Ministry of the Interior jurisdiction, but the ministry was itself a militarized structure) and, more importantly, its Interior Troops, the Border Troops—which in different periods fell under either Ministry of Defense or Ministry of the Interior control—Civil Defense Service, the Signals Troops (government communications) and the Transport Troops (mostly railway infrastructure maintenance), which were two separate services under the Postal and Communications Committee (a ministry), etc. The combined strength of the Bulgarian People's Army and all those services reached well over 325,000 troops.

=== From 1990 ===
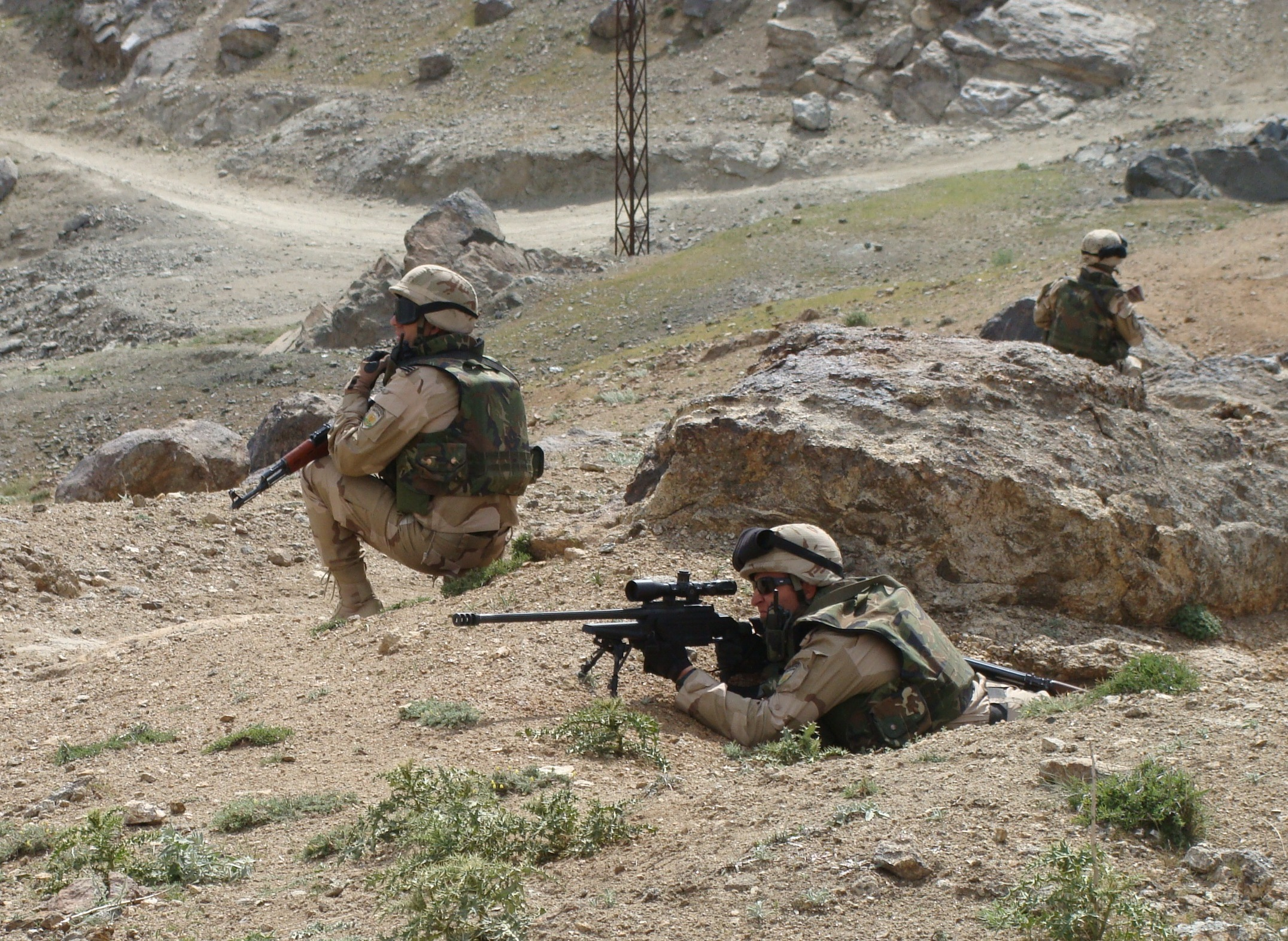
A Land Forces dismounted patrol in Afghanistan, January 2011

With the collapse of the Warsaw Pact & the end of the Cold War, Bulgaria could no longer support a vast military. A rapid reduction in personnel & active equipment was to be carried out in parallel with a general re-alignment of strategic interests. In 1990, Bulgaria had a total of more than 2,400 tanks, 2,000 armored vehicles, 2,500 large caliber artillery systems, 300 fighter & bomber aircraft, 100 trainer aircraft, more than 40 combat & 40 transport helicopters, 4 submarines, 6 fast missile craft, 2 frigates, 5 corvettes, 6 torpedo boats, 9 patrol craft, 30 minesweepers, and 21 transport vessels. Due to the economic crisis that affected most former Eastern bloc countries, a steady reform in the military could not be carried out; much of the equipment fell into disrepair and some of it was smuggled and sold to the international black market. Inadequate payments, fuel & spare part shortages and the disbandment of many capable units led to an overall drop in combat readiness, morale & discipline.

After partially recovering from the 1990s crisis, the Bulgarian military became a part of NATO. Even before that, Bulgaria sent a total of 485 soldiers to Iraq (2003–2008) as a participant in the Iraq War and maintained a 608-men strong force in Afghanistan as part of ISAF. Bulgaria had a significant missile arsenal, including 67 SCUD-B, 50 FROG-7 & 24 SS-23 ballistic missiles. In 2002, Bulgaria disbanded the Rocket Forces despite nationwide protests and has disbanded its submarine component. Bulgaria is to have 27,000 standing troops by 2014, consisting of 14,310 troops in the land forces, 6,750 in the air force, 3,510 in the navy, and 2,420 in the joint command. In 2018, the Bulgarian Armed Forces numbered around 33,150 soldiers, 73 aircraft, 2234 vehicles, including 531 tanks, and 29 naval assets.

== Organization 2025 ==
=== Defence Staff ===
The Bulgarian Armed Forces are headquartered in Sofia, where most of the Defence staff is based. Until recently the supreme military institution was the General Staff and the most senior military officer was known as the Chief of the General Staff. After the latest military reform has been implemented the General Staff became a department within the Ministry of Defence and for that matter its name had to be changed to match the new situation. For that reason the former GS became the Defence Staff and the supreme military commander became the Chief of Defence. Currently headed by Chief of Defence admiral Emil Eftimov, the Defence Staff is responsible for operational command of the Bulgarian Army and its three major branches. Deputies: Vice Admiral Petar Petrov, General Atanas Zaprianov, General Dimitar Zekhtinov.

Supreme officer rank assignments in the Bulgarian Army and other militarised services

Established by Executive Order of the President No. 85 / 28.02.2012, most recent amendment published in the State Gazette Issue 10 from February 2, 2024:

Ministry of Defence

- Chief of Defence – General / Admiral
- Deputy Chief of Defence – Lieutenant-General / Vice-Admiral
- Deputy Chief of Defence – Lieutenant-General / Vice-Admiral (until October 1, 2014, Major-General / Rear-Admiral)
- Defense Staff
  - Director of the Defence Staff – Major-General / Rear-Admiral (established on May 6, 2018, the de facto Chief of Staff of the BAF)
  - Director, "Operations and Training" Directorate – Brigade General / Flotilla Admiral
  - Director, "Logistics" Directorate – Brigade General / Flotilla Admiral
  - Director, "Strategical Planning" Directorate – Brigade General / Flotilla Admiral
  - Director, "Communication and Information Systems" Directorate – Brigade General / Flotilla Admiral
  - Director, "Defence Policy and Planning" Directorate (established on January 1, 2019) – Brigade General / Flotilla Admiral
- Joint Forces Command
  - Commander, Joint Forces Command – Major-General / Rear-Admiral (until August 31, 2021, Lieutenant-General / Vice-Admiral)
  - Deputy Commander, Joint Forces Command – Brigade General / Flotilla Admiral (until August 31, 2021, Major-General / Rear-Admiral)
  - Chief of Staff, Joint Forces Command – Brigade General / Flotilla Admiral
- Land Forces
  - Commander, Land Forces – Major-General
  - Deputy Commander, Land Forces – Brigade General
  - Chief of Staff, Land Forces – Brigade General
  - Commander, 2nd Mechanised Brigade – Brigade General
  - Commander, 61st Mechanised Brigade – Brigade General
- Air Forces
  - Commander, Air Forces – Major-General
  - Deputy Commander, Air Forces – Brigade General
  - Commander, 3rd Air Base – Brigade General
  - Commander, 24th Air Base – Brigade General
- Navy
  - Commander, Naval Forces – Rear-Admiral
  - Deputy Commander, Naval Forces – Flotilla Admiral
  - Commander, Combat and Support Ships Flotilla – Flotilla Admiral
- Joint Special Forces Command
  - Commander, Joint Special Forces Command – Brigade General
- Logistics Support Command (established on September 1, 2021)
  - Commander, Logistics Support Command – Brigade General
- Communications and Information Support and Cyber-Defence Command (established on September 1, 2021, on the basis of the Stationary Communications and Information System)
  - Commander, Communications and Information Support and Cyber-Defence Command – Brigade General
- Military Police Service, directly subordinated to the Minister of Defense
  - Director, Military Police Service – Brigade General / Flotilla Admiral
- Military Intelligence Service, directly subordinated to the Minister of Defense
  - Director, Military Intelligence Service – Brigade General / Flotilla Admiral
- Military education institutions, directly subordinated to the Minister of Defense
  - Chief of the "Georgi Stoykov Rakovski" Military Academy – Major-General / Rear-Admiral
  - Chief of the Military Medical Academy and the Armed Forces Medical Service – Major-General / Rear-Admiral
  - Chief of the "Vasil Levski" National Military University – Brigade General
  - Chief of the "Georgi Benkovski" Higher Air Force School (re-established on January 1, 2020) – Brigade General
  - Chief of the "Nikola Yonkov Vaptsarov" Higher Naval School – Flotilla Admiral
- Other positions at the Ministry of Defense or international institutions
  - Advisor to the Supreme Commander-in-Chief, the President of the Republic of Bulgaria on Military Security Matters – Major-General / Rear-Admiral or Lieutenant-General / Vice-Admiral
  - Military Representative of the Chief of Defense at the NATO Military Committee and at the EU Military Committee – Brussels, Belgium – Lieutenant-General / Vice-Admiral
  - Director of the Intelligence Directorate at the European Union Military Committee – Brussels, Belgium – Brigade General / Flotilla Admiral
  - National Military Representative at the NATO Supreme Headquarters Allied Powers Europe – Mons, Belgium – Major-General / Rear-Admiral
  - Deputy Commander of the NATO Rapid Deployable Corps – Greece (Thessaloniki) – Major-General / Rear-Admiral
  - Deputy Chief of Staff for Operations, Multinational Corps Southeast – Sibiu, Romania – Brigade General

In addition to the aforementioned positions, there are general rank positions in the National Intelligence Service and the National Close Protection Service (the bodyguard service to high-ranking officials and visiting dignitaries). These two services are considered part of the Armed Forces of the Republic of Bulgaria, but are directly subordinated to the President of Bulgaria and fall out of the jurisdiction of the Ministry of Defense.

- National Intelligence Service
  - With the transformation of the National Intelligence Service into the State Agency for Intelligence the positions of Director, National Intelligence Service (Major-General / Rear-Admiral) and deputy director, National Intelligence Service (Brigade General / Flotilla Admiral) were stricken from the list of supreme officer assignments through Executive Order of the President No.58/22.03.2016. The newly established positions are the civilian assignments of chairman and Deputy-Chairman of the State Agency for Intelligence.
- National Close Protection Service
  - Director, National Close Protection Service - Lieutenant-General / Vice Admiral (until October 1, 2014 Major-General / Rear-Admiral)
  - Deputy Director, National Close Protection Service - Brigade General / Flotilla Admiral

With the establishment of the State Agency for National Security - SANS (Bulgarian: Darzhavna Agentsiya za Natsionalna Sigurnost - DANS, Държавна агенция за национална сигурност - ДАНС) part of the military security personnel came under its authority. Before that the security aspects of the armed forces were handled by a unified organisation under the General Staff - the "Military Service of Security and Military Police". After the formation of SANS the service was split, with the military counter-intelligence personnel entering the newly formed structure and the military police personnel staying under Ministry of Defense subordination. While technically civilian servants not part of the armed forces, the military counter-intelligence personnel of the State Agency of National Security retain their military ranks.

=== Ministry of Defence ===
Ministry of Defence
The organisation of the Ministry of Defence includes:

- Minister of Defence
- 3 Deputy-Ministers of Defence
- Political Cabinet
- Permanent Secretary of Defence (the highest-ranking civil servant of the Ministry)
- Inspectorate
- General Administration
  - "Administration and Information Support" Directorate
  - "Public Relations and Protocol" Directorate
  - "Finances" Directorate
- Specialised Administration
  - "Defence Infrastructure" Main Directorate
  - "Defence Policy and Planning" Directorate
  - "Planning, Programming and Budgeting" Directorate
  - "Defence Legal Activities" Directorate
  - "Defence Human Resources Management" Directorate
  - "Defence Public Orders" Directorate
  - "Armament Policy" Directorate
  - "Social Policy and Military-Patriotic Upbringing" Directorate
- "Security of Information" Directorate
- "Internal Audit" Directorate
- "Financial Control and Check of Material Accountability" Unit
- Civil servant in charge of personal data protection
- Chief of Defence (the highest-ranking officer, the only four-star rank on active duty)
  - Deputy-Chief of Defence (Lieutenant-General / Vice-Admiral)
  - Deputy-Chief of Defence (Lieutenant-General / Vice-Admiral)
  - Director of the Defence Staff (Major-General / Rear-Admiral, the Defence Staff is the successor of the General Staff and thus the Director is the Chief of Staff of the Bulgarian Army)
    - "Operations and Training" Directorate
    - "Logistics" Directorate
    - "Strategical Planning" Directorate
    - "Communication and Information Systems" Directorate
    - "Defence Policy and Planning" Directorate
  - Command Sergeant-Major of the Bulgarian Army

==== Structures directly subordinated to the Ministry of Defence ====
Structures directly subordinated to the Ministry of Defence include:

- Defence Intelligence Service, Sofia (commanded by a Major-General/ Rear-Admiral)
  - Director
  - Directorate
  - Information Division
  - Analysis Division
  - Resources Supply Division
- Military Police Service, Sofia (commanded by a Brigade General / Flotilla Admiral)
  - Military Police Command
  - Military Police Operational Company (MRAV Sand Cat)
  - Regional Military Police Service Sofia
  - Regional Military Police Service Plovdiv
  - Regional Military Police Service Pleven
  - Regional Military Police Service Varna
  - Regional Military Police Service Sliven
  - Military Police Service Logistics and Training Centre, Sofia
- Military Geographical Service
  - MGS Headquarters
  - Geographical Information Support Centre
  - Geodesic Observatory (GPS Observatory)
  - Military Geographical Centre
  - Information Security Unit
  - Financial Comptroller
- National Guards Unit, Sofia (commanded by a Colonel)
  - Headquarters
  - 1st Guards Battalion
  - 2nd Mixed Guards Battalion
  - National Guards Unit Representative Military Band
  - Armed Forces Representative Dance Company
  - Guardsmen Training Centre
  - Logistics Support Company
- Military Medical Academy, Sofia (commanded by a Major-General / Rear-Admiral)
  - Chief of the MMA, Chief of the MATH - Sofia and General Surgeon of the Bulgarian Armed Forces
  - Deputy Chief for Diagnostics and Medical Treatment Activities
  - Deputy Chief for Education and Scientific Activities
  - Deputy Chief for Medical Support of Military Units and Overseas Military Missions
  - Multiprofile Active Treatment Hospital - Sofia
  - Multiprofile Active Treatment Hospital (informally known as the Naval Hospital)- Varna
  - Multiprofile Active Treatment Hospital - Plovdiv
  - Multiprofile Active Treatment Hospital - Sliven
  - Multiprofile Active Treatment Hospital - Pleven
  - Follow-up Long-term Treatment and Rehabilitation Hospital "Saint George the Victorious" - Pomorie
  - Follow-up Long-term Treatment and Rehabilitation Hospital "Caleroya" - Hisar
  - Follow-up Long-term Treatment and Rehabilitation Hospital - Bankya
  - Military Medical Quick Reaction Force (expeditionary disaster and crisis relief unit)
  - Psychological Health and Prevention Centre
  - Scientific and Application Centre for Military Medical Expertise and Aviation and Seaborne Medicine
  - Scientific and Application Centre for Military Epidemiology and Hygiene
- Military Academy "Georgi Stoykov Rakovski", Sofia (commanded by a Major-General / Rear-Admiral)
  - Command
    - Commandant of the Military Academy
    - Deputy Chief for Study and Scientific Activities
    - Deputy Chief for Administrative Activities and Logistics
  - Administrative Units
    - Personnel and Administrative Support Department
    - Logistics Department
    - Study and Scientific Activities Department
    - Financial Department
    - Library and Publishing Activities Sector
    - Public Relations, International Activities and Protocol Sector
  - Training Units
    - National Security and Defence College
    - Command Staff College
    - Peacekeeping Operations and Computer Simulations Sector
    - Foreign Languages Studies Department
  - Perspective Defence Research Institute
- National Military University "Vasil Levski", Veliko Tarnovo (commanded by a Brigade General)
  - Combined Arms Education Department, Veliko Tarnovo
  - Artillery and Communication Systems Education Department, Shumen
  - NCO School, Veliko Tarnovo
  - Foreign Languages and Computer Systems Education Department, Shumen
- Higher Air Force School "Georgi Benkovski", Dolna Mitropoliya (commanded by a Brigade General, temporarily a faculty of the NMU, reinstated on January 20, 2020)
- Higher Naval School "Nikola Yonkov Vaptsarov", Varna (commanded by a Flotilla Admiral)
  - Chief of the Higher Naval Officer School
  - Deputy Chief for Administration and Logistics
  - Deputy Chief for Studies and Science Activities
  - Navigation Department
  - Engineering Department
  - Post-Graduate Qualification Department
  - Professional Petty Officers College
- Defence Institute "Prof. Tsvetan Lazarov", Sofia
  - The Defence Institute is the research and development administration of the MoD. It includes the:
  - Administration and Financial Management Department
  - Military Standardisation, Quality and Certification Department
  - Armament, Equipment and Materials Development Department
  - Armament, Equipment and Materials Testing and Control Department
  - C4I Systems Development Department
- Central Artillery Technical Evaluation Proving Ground, Stara Zagora
- Central Office of Military District, Sofia
- Commandment Service of the Ministry of Defence, Sofia
  - The Commandment Service is an institution in charge of real estate management, transportation, library services, documentation publishing and communications support for the central administration of the MoD, transportation support to the immediate MoD personnel, classified information, cryptographic and perimeter security for the MoD administration buildings.
  - Director
  - Deputy Director
  - Chief Legal Advisor
  - Financial Comptroller
  - Administrative Department
  - Financial Department
  - Business Department
  - Transportation Support Department
  - Support Department
  - CIS Support Department
  - Technical Centre for Armed Forces Information Security
- Executive Agency for the Military Clubs and Recreational Activities, Sofia
- National Museum of Military History, Sofia

=== Joint Forces Command ===
The Joint Operational Command (Съвместно оперативно командване (СОК)) was established on October 15, 2004, with HQ in Sofia. The country became member of NATO in the same year and this reorganisation was done to streamline the Bulgarian Armed Forces to NATO practices. The planning and execution of military operation was transferred from the respective armed service commands to a joint organisation.

In 2010 the Ministry of Defence completed a thorough study of the defence policy and issued a White Book, or a White Paper on Defence, calling for a major overhaul of the structure of Defence Forces. On July 1, 2011, the Joint Operational Command was reorganised into the Joint Forces Command (Съвместно командване на силите (СКС)) According to the document the military of the Republic of Bulgaria should include two mechanized brigades, four regiments (Logistics, Artillery, Engineering, SpecOps), four battalions (Reconnaissance, Mechanized, NBC, psychological operations) in the Land Forces; two air bases, SAM air defense base and Air force training base in the Air Force; and one naval base consisting of two homeports in the Navy. There are seven brigade level formations, including the two mechanised brigades and the special forces brigade of the army, the two air bases of the air force, the naval base and the logistical brigade of the JOC.

On September 1, 2021, the Joint Forces Command was reorganised again in accordance with the Development Plant for the Armed Forces until 2026 (План за развитие на Въоръжените сили до 2026 г.), set in action by Resolution of the Government No. 183/07.05.2021. The logistics brigade and the movement control units of the JFC formed the Logistics Support Command. Since then the Joint Forces Command has seven units directly subordinated to it:

- Military Command Center (Военен команден център), Sofia - commanded by a Colonel
- Mobile Communications and Information System (Мобилна КИС), Gorna Malina - commanded by a Colonel
- National Military Study Complex "Charalitsa" (Национален военен учебен комплекс "Чаралица"), Gorna Malina - commanded by a Colonel
- Center for Surveillance and Control of Radiological, Chemical, Biological and Environmental Situation (Център за Наблюдение и Контрол на РХБ и ЕО), Bankya - commanded by a Colonel
- Operational Archive of the Bulgarian Army (Оперативен архив на БА), Sofia - commanded by a Lieutenant-Colonel
- Operational Intelligence Information Center (Оперативен разузнавателно-информационен център), Sofia - commanded by a Lieutenant-Colonel
- Support and Supply Group (Група за осигуряване и поддръжка), Sofia - commanded by a Lieutenant-Colonel

The Joint Forces Training Range "Novo Selo" used to be under the JFC, but the latest re-organisation of the Command from 2021 lists seven subordinated units, so the training range is no longer part of it, but it is unclear if it was subordinated to the Land Forces or the Logistical Support Command.

With the introduction of the new force structure of the Bulgarian Armed Forces the commands of three armed services of the Bulgarian Army - the Land, Air and Naval Forces are responsible for the generation of combat-ready forces, which are transferred under the operational command and control of the JFC.

- Land Forces Command
- Naval Forces Command
- Air Forces Command

Under the previous structure they were subordinated to the JFC.

The logistics units of the JFC were re-arranged into the newly formed Logistical Support Command (Командване за логистична поддръжка (КЛП)):

- Logistical Support Command, Sofia
  - Command Headquarters
  - 1st Transport Battalion, Sofia
  - 2nd Transport Battalion, Burgas
  - Central Supply Base, Negushevo
  - repair and maintenance bases
  - depots, storage facilities and technical inspection units
  - Movement Control Headquarters

The previous 62nd Signals Brigade at Gorna Malina was responsible for maintaining the higher military communication lines. Next to the functions of the Signals Regiment in the Sofia suburb of Suhodol, the brigade had at least three dispersed signals regiments for government communications, such as the 75th Signals Regiment (Lovech), the 65th Signals Regiment (Nova Zagora) and at least one additional unknown Signals Regiment in the Rila-Pirin mountain massif. The modern successor of the 62nd Signals Brigade are the Stationary Communication and Information System (Стационарна Комуникационна Информационна Система (СКИС)) of the Defence Staff (which fulfils also the tasks of SIGINT and Cyber Defence next to its strategic communications mission) and the Mobile Communication and Information System (Мобилна Комуникационна Информационна Система (МКИС)) of the Joint Forces Command.

On September 1, 2021, the Stationary Communications and Information System, which was directly subordinated to the Minister of Defence, became the Communications and Information Support and Cyber-Defence Command (Командване за комуникационно-информационна поддръжка и киберотбрана (ККИПКО)).

- Communications and Information Support and Cyber-Defence Command, Sofia
  - Communications and Information Center
  - Government Communications Support Center
  - Operational Centers
  - Engineering and CIS Recovery Center
  - Stationary Communications Network

=== Joint Special Operations Command ===
The 68th Special Forces Brigade was removed from the Land Forces' ORBAT on 1 February 2017, de facto becoming the country's fourth combat service. Unlike Bulgaria's Land, Air and Naval Forces, however, it fell outside of the Joint Forces Command structure, having been assigned directly under the authority of the Chief of Defence. The brigade was transformed into the JSOC, taking effect on November 1, 2019, and its commander, Brigade General Yavor Mateev was promoted to a major general as the chief of the new command.

- Joint Special Operations Command, Plovdiv
  - Command Staff and Command Battalion
  - 68th Special Forces Group (designated in honour of the former 68th Training Para-Recon Base, Plovdiv)
  - 86th Special Forces Group (designated in honour of the former 86th Training Para-Recon Base, Musachevo)
  - 1st Special Forces Group (Newest Special Operations Group, Stationed in Bankya)
  - 3rd Special Forces Group
  - Training and Combat Support Center
  - Logistics Support Battalion
  - Medical Point

=== Personnel and education ===
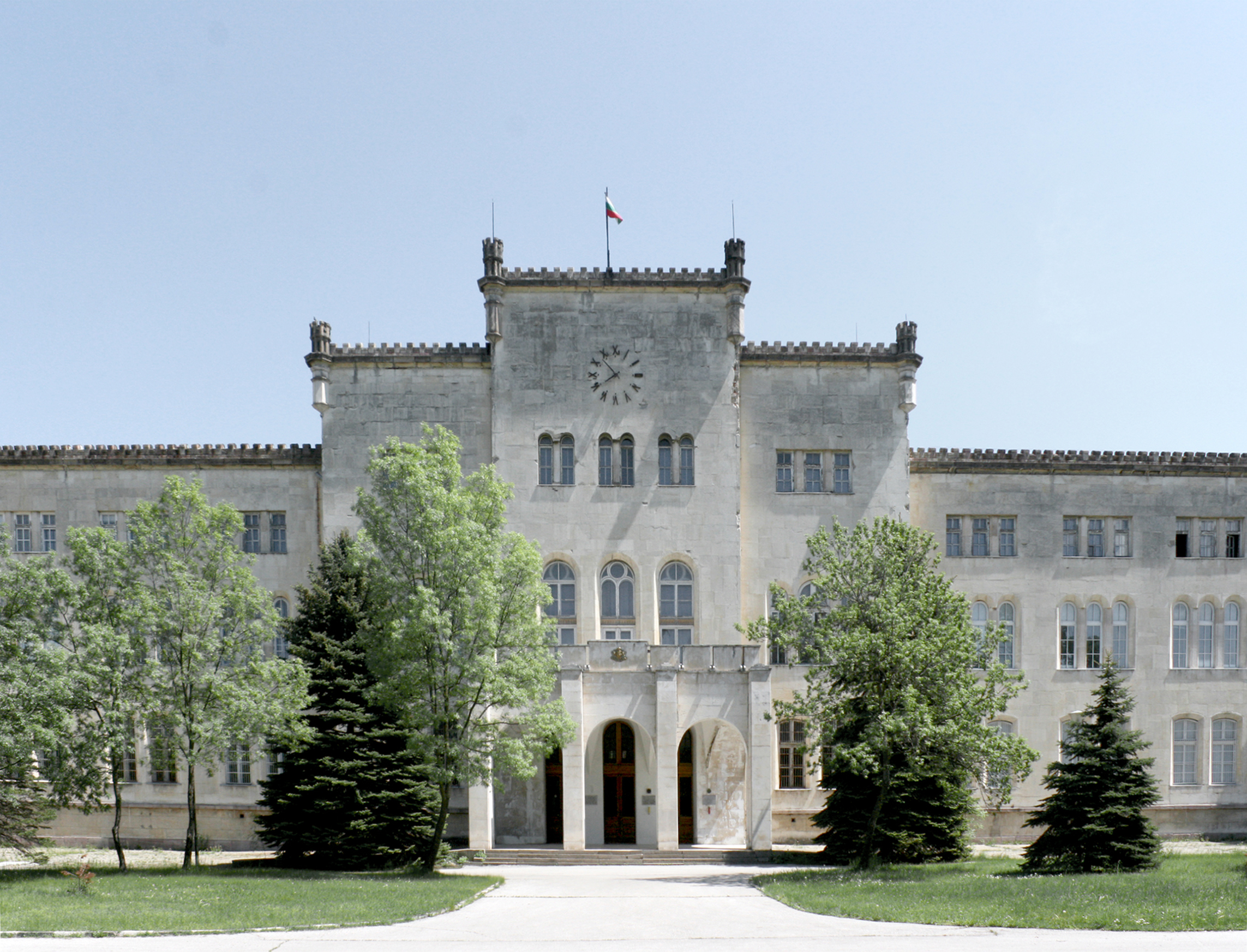
Rakovski Defence and Staff College

Bulgaria's total military personnel as of 2014 is 37,100, of which 30,400 (80.1%) are active military personnel and 8,100 (11.9%) are civilian personnel. The Land Forces are the largest branch, with at least 18,000 men serving there. In terms of percentage, 53% of all Army personnel are in the Land Forces, 25% are in the Air Force, 13% are in the Navy and 9% are in the Joint Forces Command. Annual spending per soldier amounts to 15,000 euro and is scheduled to increase to 21.000€ by 2014.

Unlike many former Soviet bloc militaries, discipline and morale problems are not common. During the Communist era, the army members enjoyed extensive social privileges. After the fall of Communism and Bulgaria's transition to a market economy, wages fell severely. For almost a decade social benefits were virtually non-existent, and some of them have been restored but recently. Nikolai Tsonev, defence minister under the 2005–2009 cabinet, undertook steps to provide the members of the military and their families with certain privileges in terms of healthcare and education, and to improve living conditions.

Military education in Bulgaria is provided in military universities and academies. Due to cuts in spending and manpower some universities have been disbanded and their campuses were included as faculties of other, larger educational entities. The largest institutions of military education in Bulgaria are:

- Vasil Levski National Military University
- Rakovski Defence and Staff College
- Nikola Vaptsarov Naval Academy
- Military Medical Academy – a mixed military academy/hospital institution

=== Training ===
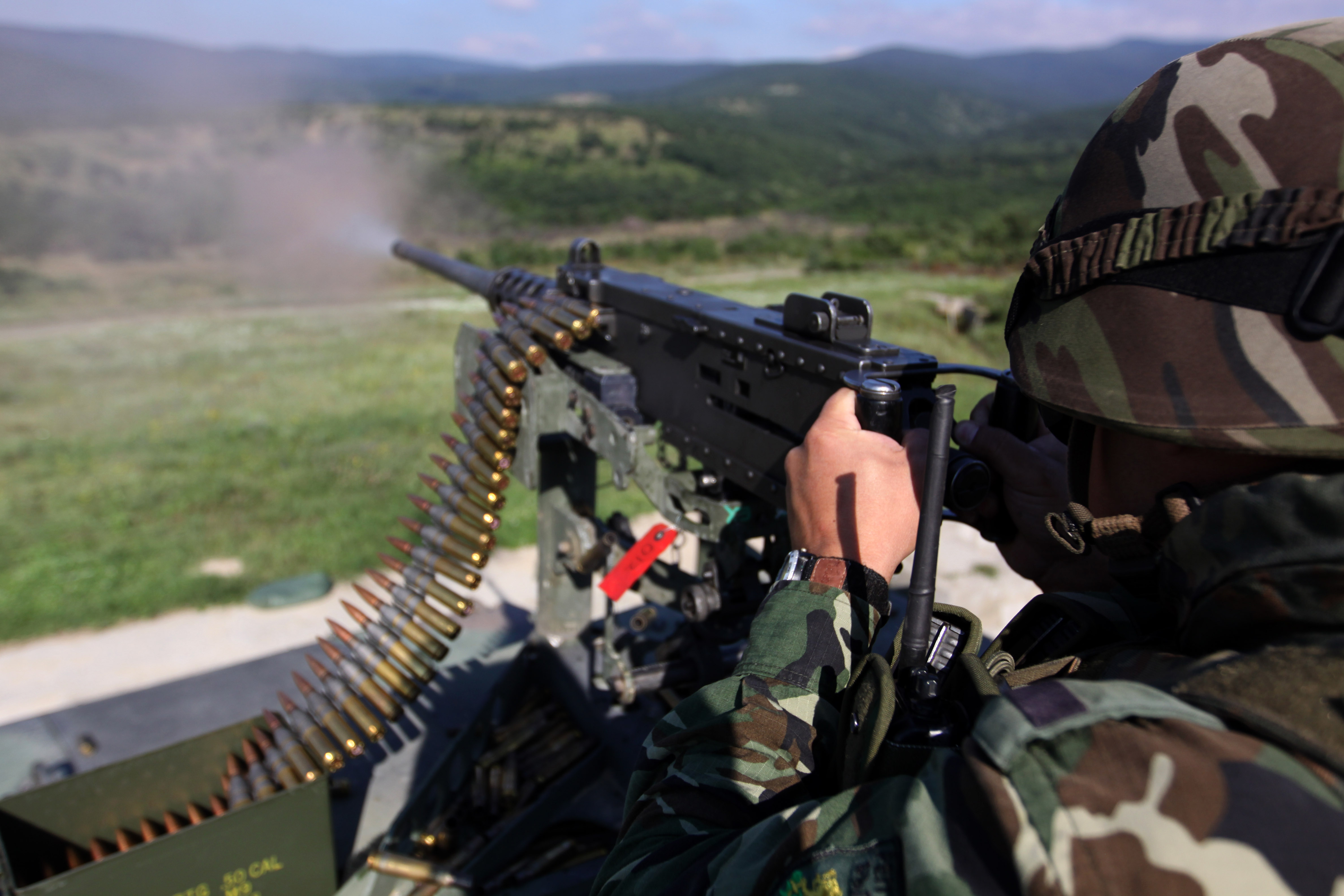
Bulgarian trooper fires an M2 Browning .50 cal machine gun at the Novo Selo training range

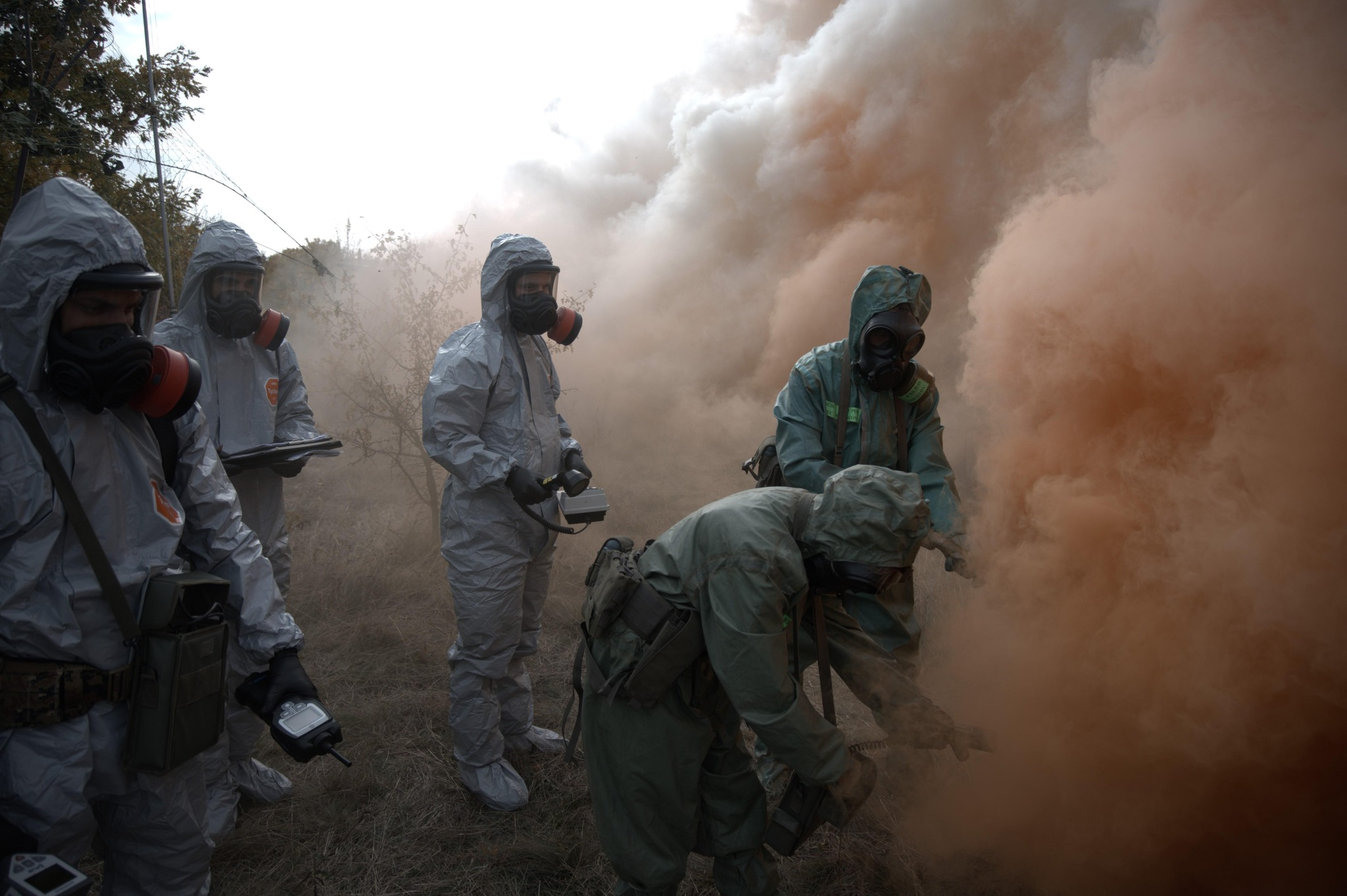
Bulgarian and Italian CBRN specialists on training exercise

The Land Forces practice extensive year-round military training in various conditions. Cooperative drills with the United States are very common, the last series of them conducted in 2008. Bulgaria's most recent full-scale exercise simulating a foreign invasion was carried out in 2009. It was conducted at the Koren range, and included some 1,700 personnel with tanks, ATGMs, attack aircraft, AA guns and armored vehicles. The combat skills of individual soldiers are on a very high level, on par with troops of the U.S. Army.

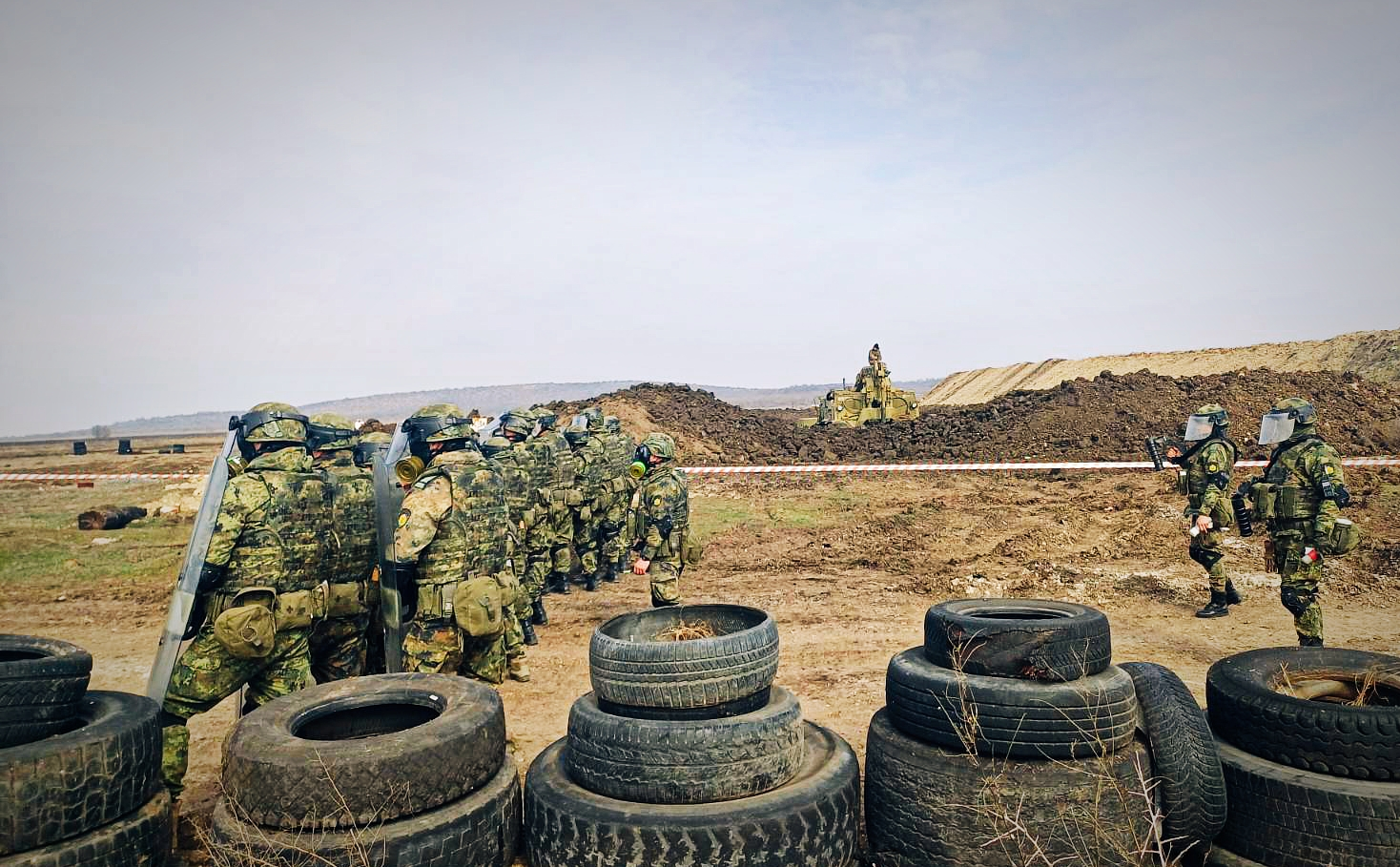
Bulgarian Land Forces soldiers on riot training for a deployment to Kosovo

Until recent years the Air Force suffered somewhat from fuel shortages; a problem which was overcome in 2008. Fighter pilots have year-round flights, but gunship pilots do not fly often due to the yet unfulfilled modernization of the Mi-24 gunships. Due to financial difficulties fighter pilots have 60 hours of flying time per year, only a third of the national norm of 180 hours.

The Navy also has some fuel shortage problems, but military training is still effective. The most recent overseas operation of the Navy was along the coast of Libya as part of Operation Unified Protector.

=== Bulgarian Armed Forces organization graphic overview ===
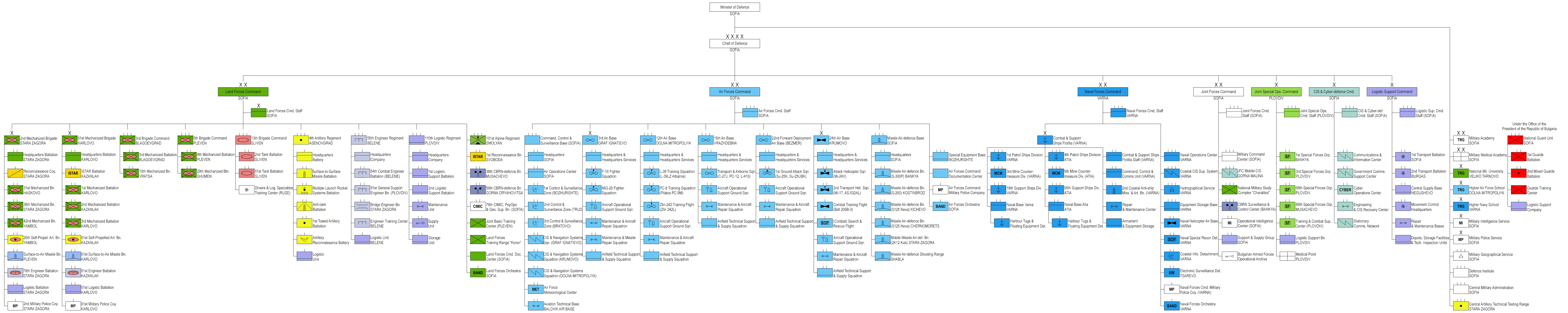
Bulgarian Armed Forces organization 2025

=== Budget ===
After the collapse of the Warsaw pact, Bulgaria lost the ability to acquire cheap fuel and spares for its military. A large portion of its nearly 2,000 T-55 tanks fell into disrepair, and eventually almost all of them were scrapped or sold to other countries. In the early 1990s the budget was so small, that regulars only received token-value payments. Many educated and well-trained officers lost the opportunity to educate younger soldiers, as the necessary equipment and basis lacked adequate funding. Military spending increased gradually, especially in the last 10 years. As of 2005, the budget was no more than $400 mln., while military spending for 2009 amounted to more than $1.3 bln. – almost a triple increase for 4 years. Despite this growth, the military still does not receive sufficient funds for modernisation. An example of bad spending plans is the large-scale purchasing of transport aircraft, while the Air Force has a severe need of new fighters (the MiG-29s, even though modernised, are nearing their operational limits). The planned procurement of 2–4 Gowind class corvettes has been cancelled. As of 2009, military spending was about 1.98% of GDP. In 2010 the budget is to be only 1.3% due to the international financial crisis.

== Land Forces ==
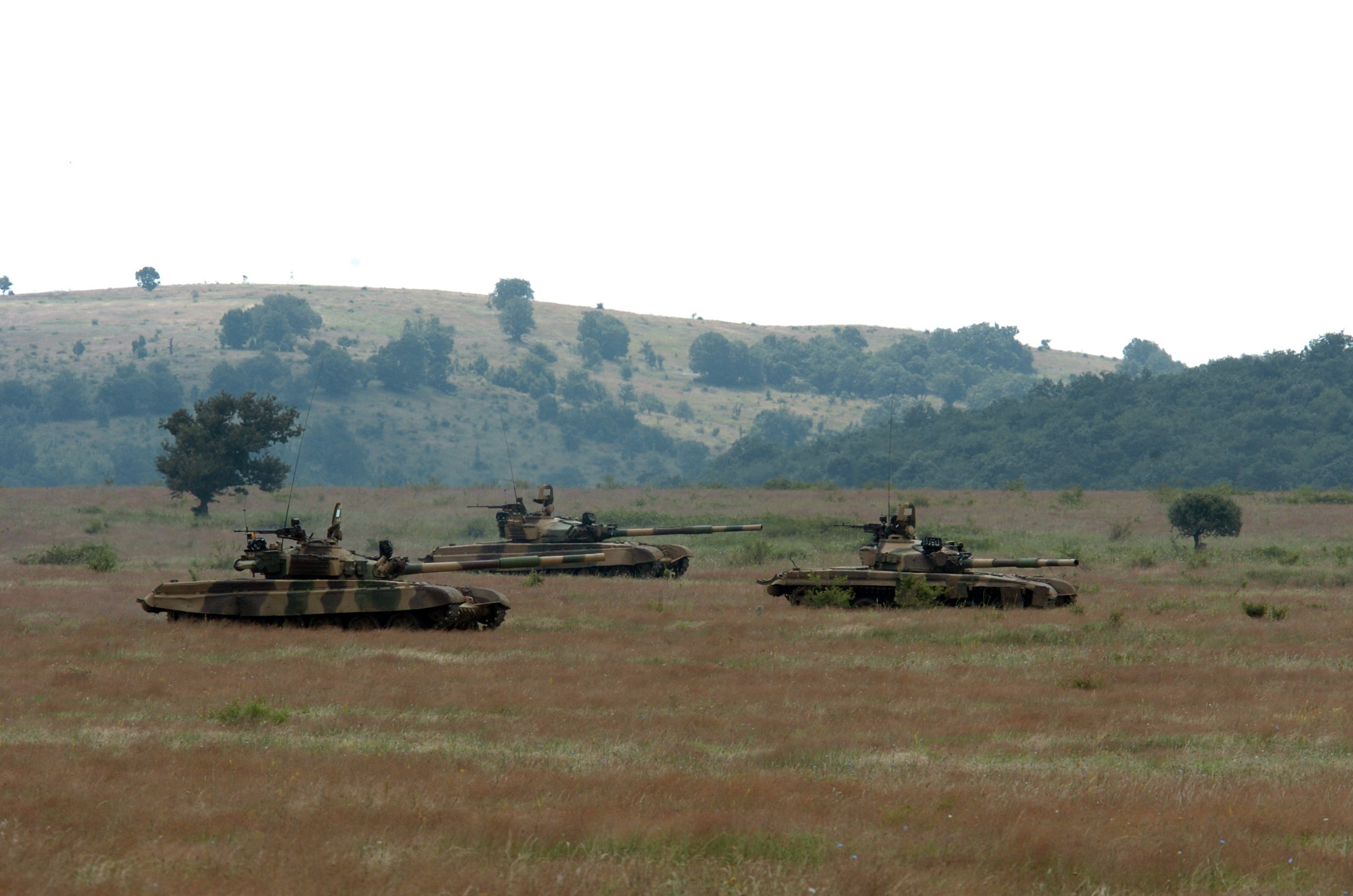
T-72 tanks advance towards the OPFOR on an exercise

The Land Forces are functionally divided into Deployable and Reserve Forces. Their main functions include deterrence, defence, peace support and crisis management, humanitarian and rescue missions, as well as social functions within Bulgarian society. Active troops in the land forces number about 18,000 men, and reserve troops number about 13,000.

The equipment of the land forces is impressive in terms of numbers, but most of it is nonoperational and scheduled to be scrapped or refurbished and exported to other nations. Bulgaria has a military stockpile of about 5,000,000 small arms, models ranging from World War II-era MP 40 machine pistols to modern Steyr AUG, AK-74, HK MP5, HK416 and AR-M12F assault rifles.

=== National guard unit ===
The National Guard of Bulgaria, founded in 1879, is the successor to the personal guards of Knyaz Alexander I. On 12 July of that year, the guards escorted the Bulgarian knyaz for the first time; today the official holiday of the National Guard is celebrated on 12 July. Throughout the years the structure of the guards has evolved, going from convoy to squadron, to regiment and, subsequent to 1942, to division. Today it includes military units for army salute and wind orchestra duties.

In 2001, the National Guard unit was designated an official military unit of the Bulgarian army and one of the symbols of state authority, along with the flag, the coat of arms and the national anthem. It is a formation, directly subordinate to the Minister of Defence and while legally part of the armed forces, it is totally independent from the Defence Staff.

=== Statistics and equipment ===
Note: This table shows combined active and reserve force. Most are listed here. In 2019 what remained from the scrapping of the previous new equipment some but not all of the T-72 Main battle tanks were sent for mechanical service for the first time in years. Most of the equipment that should be battle ready is in dire condition, old, rusty or non-functional, the rest about 50,000 tons of what was sold as scrap" can be found in some of the scrap depots near the railroad in Sofia including battle tanks, artillery, and other battle soviet era equipment.

Statistics
Personnel	36,112
Main battle tanks	<100 T-72M/M1
Heavy armored vehicles (IFVs and APCs)	<1000 (BMP-23/A, BMP-1P; BTR-60PB-MD1, MT-LB, MT-LBu)
Light armored vehicles	<500 M1117 Guardian/Commando Select (7/10), BRDM-2 (<50), M1114 Humvees (50+), Sand Cat (<25), G-class (<300)
Artillery pieces over 100 mm (excl. mortar)	<100 (BM-21, 2S1, D-20)
SAMs	84 – SA-10 Grumble (10), SA-5 Gammon (10), SA-6 Gainful (20), SA-8 Gecko (24), SA-13 Gopher (20)
ATGM systems	AT-3 Sagger, AT-4 Spigot, AT-5 Spandrel, AT-6 Spiral, AT-7 Saxhorn, BRDM-2 Konkurs (24 vehicles)
MANPADS	SA-7 Grail, SA-14 Gremlin, SA-16 Gimlet, SA-18 Grouse
SS-21 Scarab	8 TELs

== Navy ==
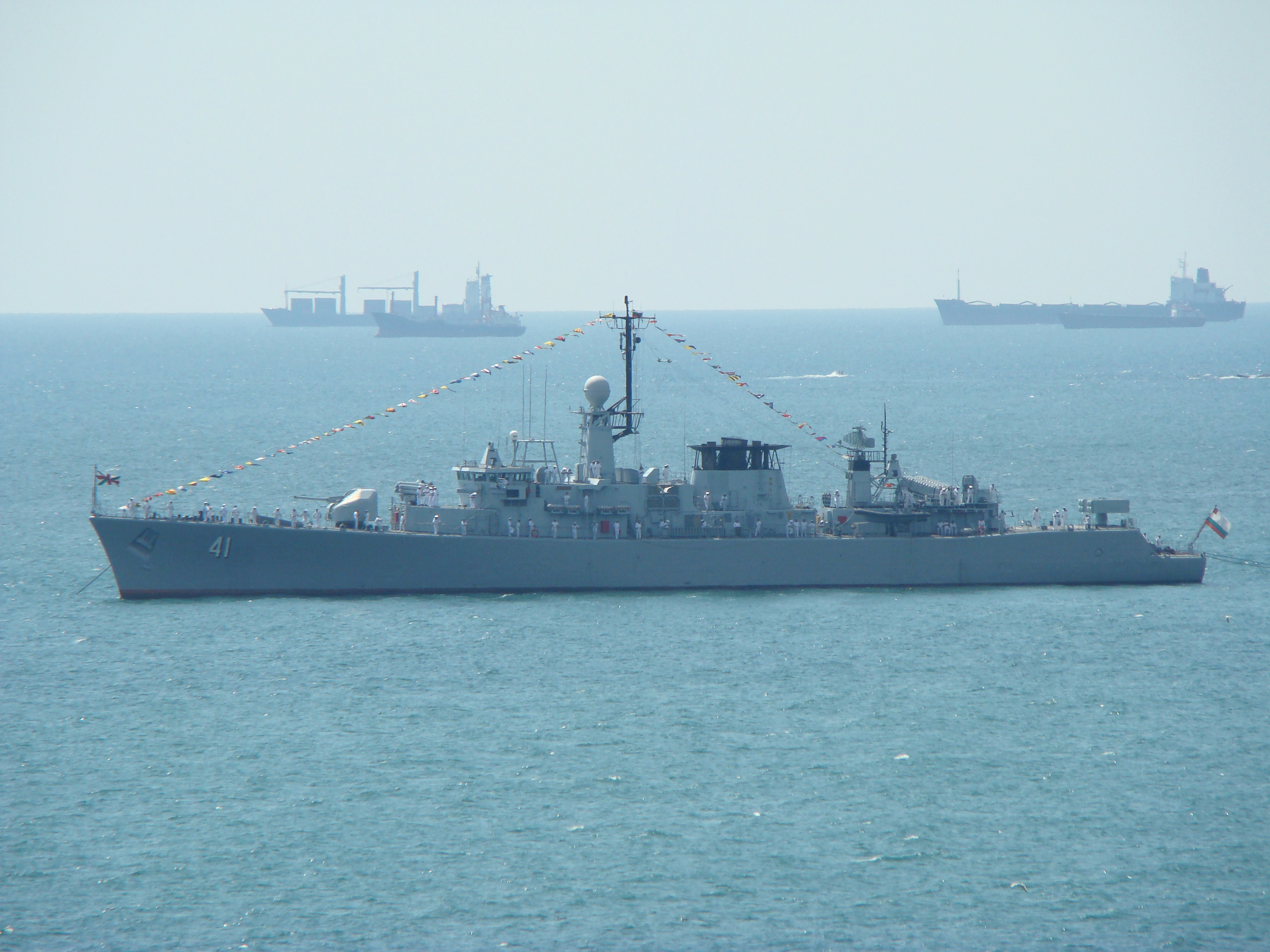
Bulgarian Frigate Drazki

The Navy has traditionally been the smallest component of the Bulgarian military. Established almost simultaneously with the Ground forces in 1879, initially it consisted of a small fleet of boats on the Danube river. Bulgaria has a coastline of about 354 kilometres – thus, naval warfare is not considered a priority.

After the downturn in 1990, the Navy was largely overlooked and received almost no funding. No projects for modernisation were carried out until 2005, when a Wielingen class frigate (F912 Wandelaar) was acquired from Belgium. By 2009, Bulgaria acquired two more frigates of the same class. The first of them was renamed 41 Drazki and took part in several operations and exercises, most notably the UNIFIL Maritime Patrol along the coast of Lebanon in 2006, and Operation Active Endeavour. It also participated in the enforcement of the naval blockade against Muammar Gaddafi's regime off the coast of Libya from 2011 until 2012.

The equipment is typical for a small navy, consisting mostly of light multi-purpose vessels – four frigates, three corvettes, five minesweepers, three fast missile craft and two landing ships. Other equipment includes a coastal defence missile battalion armed with locally modified P-15 Termit missiles, a coastal artillery battery, a naval helicopter airbase and a marine special forces unit.

The Bulgarian Navy is centered in two main bases – in Varna and in Burgas.

== Air Force ==
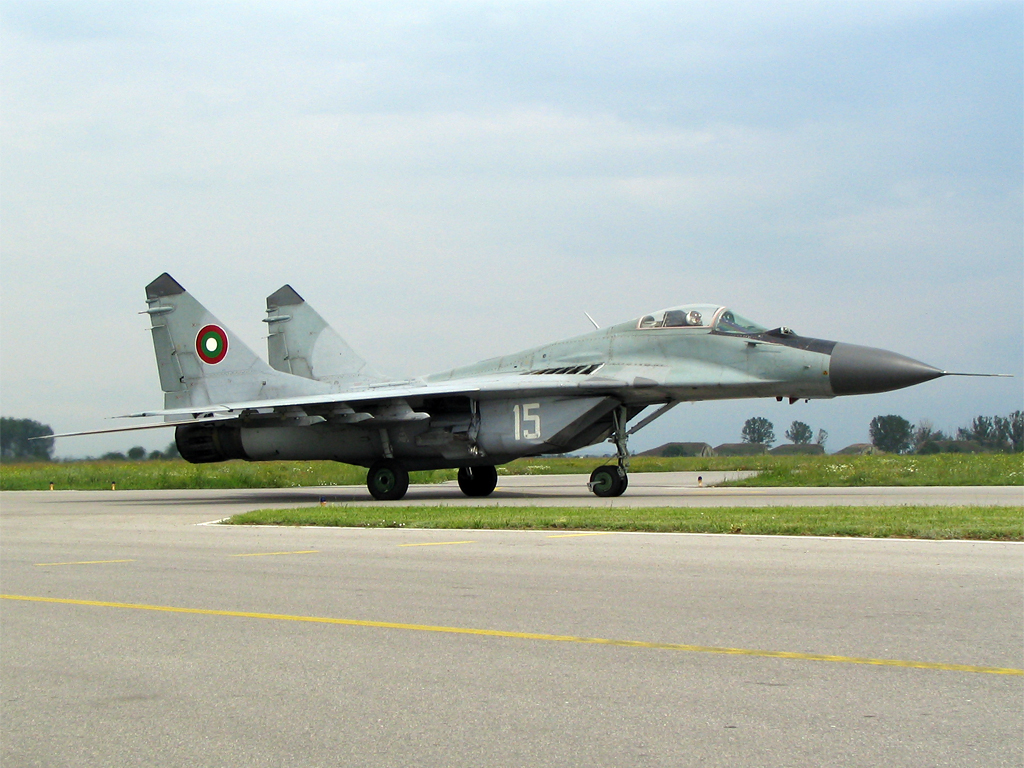
A BAF MiG-29 at Graf Ignatievo Air Base

In the past decade Bulgaria has been trying actively to restructure its army as a whole and a lot of attention has been placed on keeping the aging Russian aircraft operational. Currently the attack and defence branches of the Bulgarian air force are mainly MiG-29s and Su-25s. About 15 MiG-29 fighters have been modernised in order to meet NATO standards. The first aircraft arrived on 29 November 2007 and final delivery was due in March 2009. In 2006 the Bulgarian government signed a contract with Alenia Aeronautica for the delivery of five C-27J Spartan transport aircraft to replace the Soviet-made An-24 and An-26, although the contract was later changed to only three aircraft. Modern EU-made transport helicopters were purchased in 2005 and a total of 12 Eurocopter Cougar have been delivered (eight transport and four CSAR). Three Eurocopter AS565 Panther helicopters for the Bulgarian Navy arrived in 2016.

Branches of the Air Force include fighter aviation, assault aviation, intelligence aviation and transportation aviation, aid defence troops, radio-technical troops, communications troops, radio-technical support troops, logistics and medical troops.

The Bulgarian Ministry of Defense has announced plans to withdraw and replace the MiG-29 fighters with new F-16V Fighting Falcon by 2025–2026.

=== Aircraft inventory ===
With the exception of the Navy's small helicopter fleet, the Air Force are responsible for all military aircraft in Bulgaria. The Air Force's inventory numbers <50 aircraft, including combat jets and helicopters. Aircraft of Western origin have only begun to enter the fleet, making up a small number of the total in service. Most aircraft are unusable, old and inactive.

== Bulgarian-American cooperation ==
A US Stryker IFV on a training range near Novo Selo

The Bulgarian-American Joint Military Facilities were established by a Defence Cooperation Agreement signed by the United States and Bulgaria in April 2006. Under the agreement, U.S. forces can conduct training at several bases in the country, which remain under Bulgarian command and under the Bulgarian flag. Under the agreement, no more than 2,500 U.S. military personnel can be located at the joint military facilities.

Foreign Policy magazine lists Bezmer Air Base as one of the six most important overseas facilities used by the USAF.

== Deployments ==
Both during Communist rule and after, Bulgaria has deployed troops with different tasks in various countries. The table below lists Bulgarian military deployments in foreign countries. Active missions are shown in bold.

Country	Operation	Organisation	Timespan	Personnel	Casualties
Libyan Arab Jamahiriya	–	People's Republic of Bulgaria	?	a total of 9,000 military and non-military advisors	–
Nicaragua	Nicaraguan Revolution	People's Republic of Bulgaria	1980s	unknown number of military instructors	–
Cambodia	peacekeeping	UNTAC	1992–1993	850 troops 34 military observers 11 military police 10 officers	11
Angola	military observation	UNOMA	1995–2000	48 military observers	–
Tajikistan	military observation	UNMOT	1995–2000	27 military observers	–
Bosnia and Herzegovina	peacekeeping (EUFOR Althea)	SFOR / EUFOR	**1997–present**	140	-
Croatia	demining	OSCE	1999–2001	unknown	–
Ethiopia / Eritrea	peacekeeping	UNMEE	2001–2004	11 military observers	–
Kosovo	construction / peacekeeping	UNMIK and KFOR	**2000–present**	Around 300	–
Republic of Macedonia	humanitarian (construction of field kitchens and a hospital)	–	1999–2003	?	–
Afghanistan	internal security / anti-terrorist	ISAF	2001–2021	a total of 11,148 armed forces servicemen	-
Liberia	peacekeeping	UNMIL	2003–2018	2	-
Iraq	Iraq War	Multi-National Force – Iraq	2003–2008	485	13
Georgia	peacekeeping	EUMM Georgia	**2008–present**	12	-
Iraq	training mission	NATO Training Mission – Iraq	2009–December 2011	-	-
Libya	Operation Unified Protector	–	27 April 2011 – 3 June 2011	160 military observers, including a group of 12 naval special commandos with the frigate Drazki	–
**Somalia**	anti-piracy	Atalanta/Ocean Shield	**2012–present**	3	–

== Modernization program ==
On April 19, 2024, the Bulgarian National Assembly approved the ''Program for investments in defence until 2032''. It is supposed to introduce new technologies in the Bulgarian Armed Forces and make up for 30 years of lack of modernization and new equipment. The program includes acquisitions of:

New Armored vehicles for mechanized battalions in the Land Forces.(Completed. Stryker vehicles ordered in December 2023 from the United States)

New AESA 3D radars for the Bulgarian Air Force.(Completed. Ground Master 400a radars on order from France)

New coastal Anti-ship missiles for the Bulgarian Navy.(Completed. Naval Strike Missile systems on order from the United States)

Communication and Information systems for divisional headquarters of multinational divisional command.

New Medium to Long range Surface-to-air missiles for the Bulgarian Air Force.(In progress, one battery of IRIS-T SLM on order. Plan is for 6 IRIS-T SLM batteries and 1 SLX battery.)

New air defence systems for a mechanized brigade for the Bulgarian Land Forces.(SHORAD)

New Multiple launch rocket system with increased mobility for the Bulgarian Land Forces.(The Ministry of Defence is interested in acquiring EuroPULS systems using the Security Action for Europe program)

New 155 mm Self-propelled howitzers for the Bulgarian Land Forces.(The Ministry of Defence is interested in acquiring CAESAR howitzers using the Security Action for Europe program)

Unmanned combat aerial vehicles for the Bulgarian Air Force

New Attack helicopters for the Bulgarian Air Force.

New Minehunters for the Bulgarian Navy.(7 Tripartite-class minehunters gifted from Belgium and the Netherlands)

Development of abilities to overcome dry and water obstacles.

New Multipurpose corvettes/ missile boats for the Bulgarian Navy

== See also ==
- Defense industry of Bulgaria
- List of modern equipment of the Bulgarian Armed Forces
- Bulgaria and weapons of mass destruction
- Medieval Bulgarian Army

== Sources ==
- Hall, Richard C. (2000). The Balkan Wars, 1912–1913: Prelude to the First World War. Routledge. ISBN 0-415-22946-4.
- Бяла книга на Въоръжените сили (White Paper of the Armed Forces), Ministry of Defence of Bulgaria, 2011.
- Wikisource:Great Battles of Bulgaria

== Bibliography ==
- IISS (2020). The Military Balance 2020. Routledge. ISBN 978-0367466398.
- International Institute for Strategic Studies (3 February 2010). Hackett, James (ed.). The Military Balance 2010. London: Routledge. ISBN 978-1857435573.
