= Boyadzhiev =

Boyadzhiev or Boyadjiev (Bulgarian: Бояджиев; feminine Boyadzhieva or Boyadjieva) is a surname of Bulgarian origin. Notable people with the surname include:

== Boyadzhiev ==
- Biser Boyadzhiev (born 1948), Bulgarian rower
- Bozhidar Boyadzhiev (born 1978), Bulgarian wrestler
- Georgi Boyadzhiev (born 1943), Bulgarian volleyball player
- Hacho Boyadzhiev (1932–2012), Bulgarian television and film director
- Ivan Boyadzhiev (born 1938), Bulgarian footballer
- Kliment Boyadzhiev (1861–1933), Bulgarian military officer
- Miroslav Boyadzhiev (born 1979), Bulgarian short-track speed skater
- Stanislav Boyadzhiev (1945–2020), Bulgarian basketball player
- Todor Boyadzhiev (1939–2022), Bulgarian engineer and politician
- Vladimir Boyadzhiev (1869–1956), Bulgarian revolutionary
- Zhivko Boyadzhiev (born 1976), Bulgarian footballer
- Zlatyu Boyadzhiev (1903–1976), Bulgarian painter

== Boyadjiev ==
- Pepka Boyadjieva (born 1954), Bulgarian academic, philosopher, and sociologist

== See also ==
- Boyadzhiev Point, Elephant Island, Antarctica
- Boyadjiev–Jabs syndrome
- Bojadžiev (Macedonian: Бојаџиев), Macedonian surname
- Bojadžijev (Serbo-Croatian Cyrillic: Бојаџијев), Montenegrin and Serbian surname
- Boyadzhiyev, Russian surname
