= Yuliyana Plevnelieva =

First Lady of Bulgaria from 2012 to 2017

First Lady of Bulgaria
- In role 22 January 2012 – 22 January 2017
- President: Rosen Plevneliev
- Preceded by: Zorka Parvanova
- Succeeded by: Desislava Radeva

Personal details
- Born: 28 January 1975 (age 51) Sofia, Bulgaria
- Spouse: Rosen Plevneliev (m. 2000; div. 2017)
- Children: Three sons
- Education: New Bulgarian University

Yuliyana Yurieva Plevnelieva (Bulgarian: Юлияна Юриева Плевнелиева; born 28 January 1975) is a Bulgarian journalist and First Lady of Bulgaria from 2012 until 2017. She is the ex-wife of former Bulgarian President Rosen Plevneliev, whom she divorced in 2017.

== Biography ==
Plevnelieva was born on 28 January 1975. She graduated from Second English High School in Sofia and studied law at New Bulgarian University (NBU) in Sofia. She also attended City University of Seattle in the United States for finance during the 2000s.

In 2000, she married Rosen Plevneliev, who is eleven years older than her. It was her first marriage and Plevneliev's second. The couple had three sons: Philip (2000 - 2015), Asen (born 2001) and Pavel (born 2006).

Plevnelieva worked as a coordinator for the Bulgarian IDLO Alumni Association from August 2003 to September 2004. In 2004, Plevnelieva was hired by Economedia, a business media company. (The Plevneliev family were close friends with businessman Ivo Prokopiev, the owner of Economedia). She continued her work at Economedia while serving as First Lady of Bulgaria. Her stories were published in Capital, a weekly newspaper published by Economedia. Soon after her husband assumed the presidency, Plevnelieva left Economedia to establish her own company.

During her husband's presidency, Yuliyana Plevnelieva general eschewed the role official and unofficial protocols of first lady, instead focusing on her family and career. For example, Plevnelieva did not grant a single interview during her years in the role.

In October 2017, Plevnelieva and Plevneliev announced their divorce after 17 years amid speculation of an affair by the former president. Former President married his third wife, Desislava Banova, shortly after the divorce was finalized.

After the divorce Plevnelieva got back her maiden name - Yordanova.
