= Desislava Radeva =

First Lady of Bulgaria from 2017 to 2026

- Десислава Радева
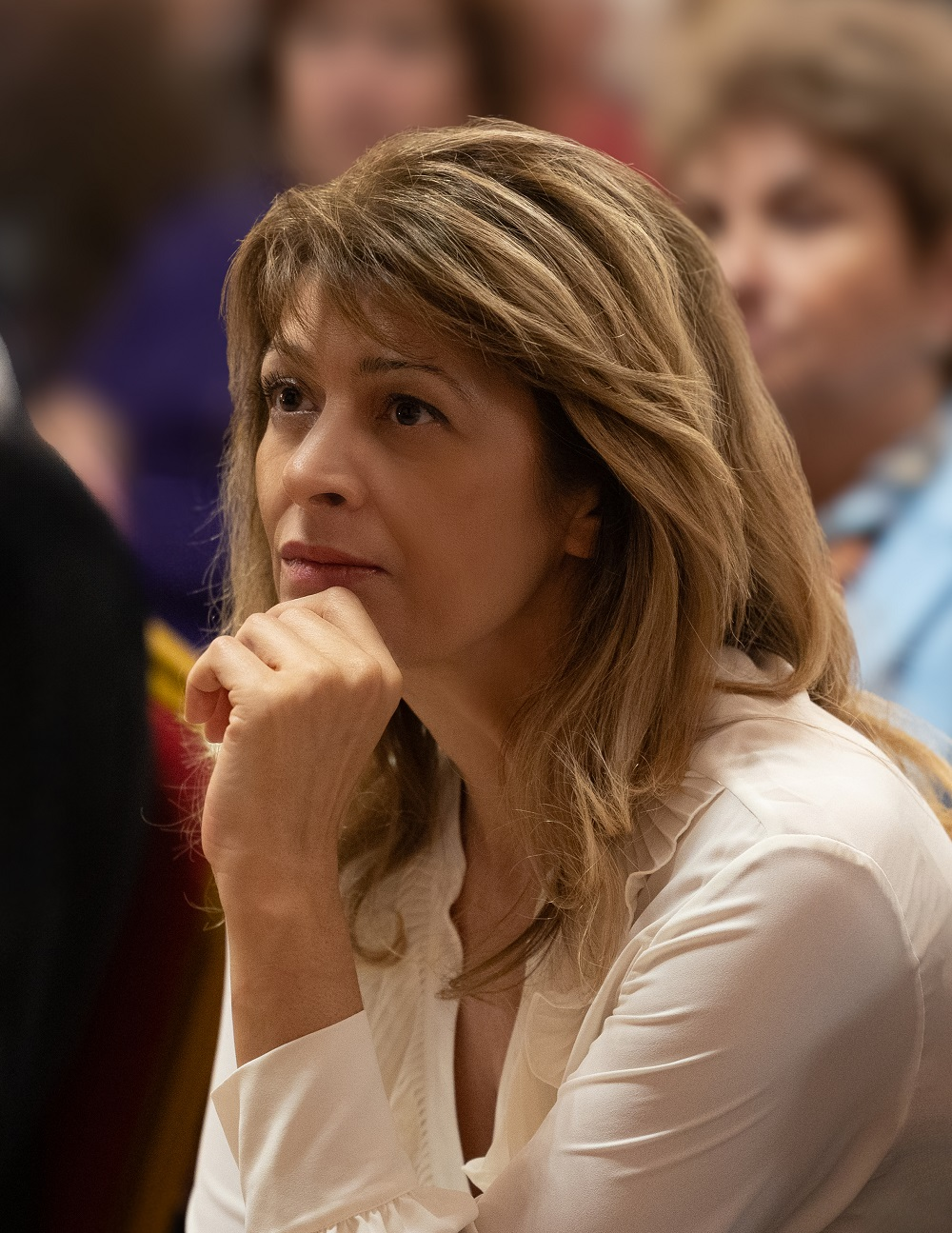
- Radeva in 2024

Spouse of the Prime Minister of Bulgaria
- Current
- Assumed role 8 May 2026
- Prime Minister: Rumen Radev
- Preceded by: Pavlina Andreeva (caretaker) (2025)

First Lady of Bulgaria
- In role 22 January 2017 – 23 January 2026
- President: Rumen Radev
- Preceded by: Yuliyana Plevnelieva
- Succeeded by: Andrey Yotov (as First Gentleman)

Personal details
- Born: Desislava Kirilova Gencheva; 9 July 1969 (age 57) Burgas, PR Bulgaria
- Spouses: Georgi Svilenski (divorced) Rumen Radev (m. 2016)
- Children: 1
- Education: University of National and World Economy; University of Forestry, Sofia

Desislava Kirilova Radeva (Note: Bulgarian: Десислава Кирилова Радева) (née Gencheva; (Note: Bulgarian: Генчева) born 9 July 1969) is a Bulgarian public figure who served as the First Lady of Bulgaria from 2017 to 2026 as the wife of President Rumen Radev.

== Early life and career ==
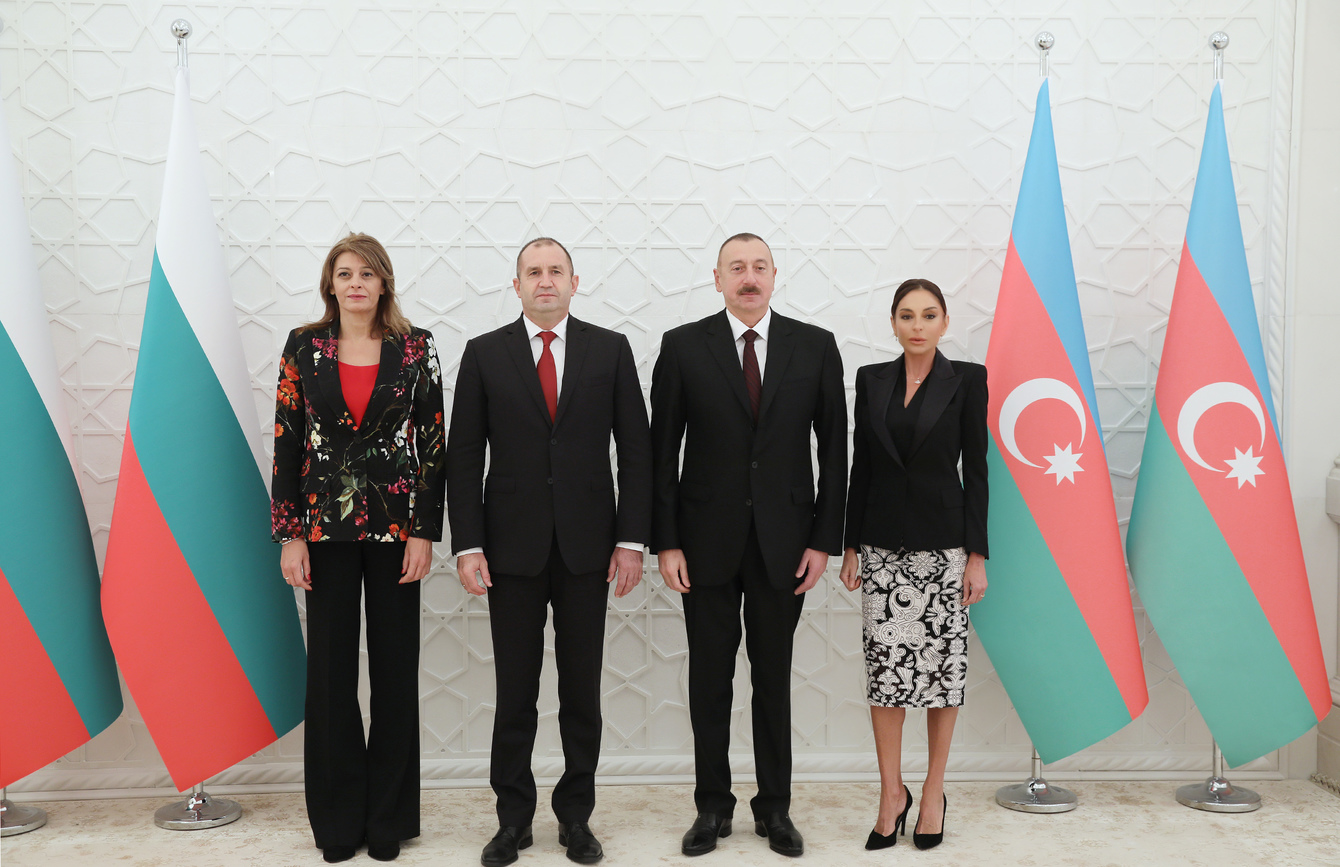
Radeva with her husband and Azerbaijani President Ilham Aliyev and his wife Mehriban Aliyeva.

Born Desislava Gencheva in Burgas on 9 July 1969, she studied at the Geo Milev English Language School for secondary school before going on to the University of National and World Economy in Finance and Credit. She also studied at the University of Forestry, Sofia. In her student years, she worked as an assistant to the Minister of Agriculture Rumen Hristov. She continued her career as an office manager in TV shows such as Kanaleto and Hushove. She was subsequently responsible for public relations at the Bulgarian Music Company. Later, she became an assistant to the general manager of Heineken in Bulgaria. She took an active part in the 2016 Bulgarian presidential election, campaigning for her then partner Rumen Radev. In 2017, she founded a non-profit association called the "Living Water of Bulgaria", which carries out activities in the public interest.

== Personal life ==
Radeva married her husband in 2016. She was previously married to Georgi Svilenski, a Bulgarian engineer and member of the National Assembly from the Bulgarian Socialist Party (BSP). She has one son from her 13-year marriage to Svilenski. Besides her native Bulgarian language, she is also fluent in English and Russian. She is a Bulgarian Orthodox.

== Honour ==
=== Foreign honour ===
- Italy: Knight Grand Cross of the Order of Merit of the Italian Republic (17 April 2024)
- Portugal: Grand Cross of the Order of Merit (30 January 2019)

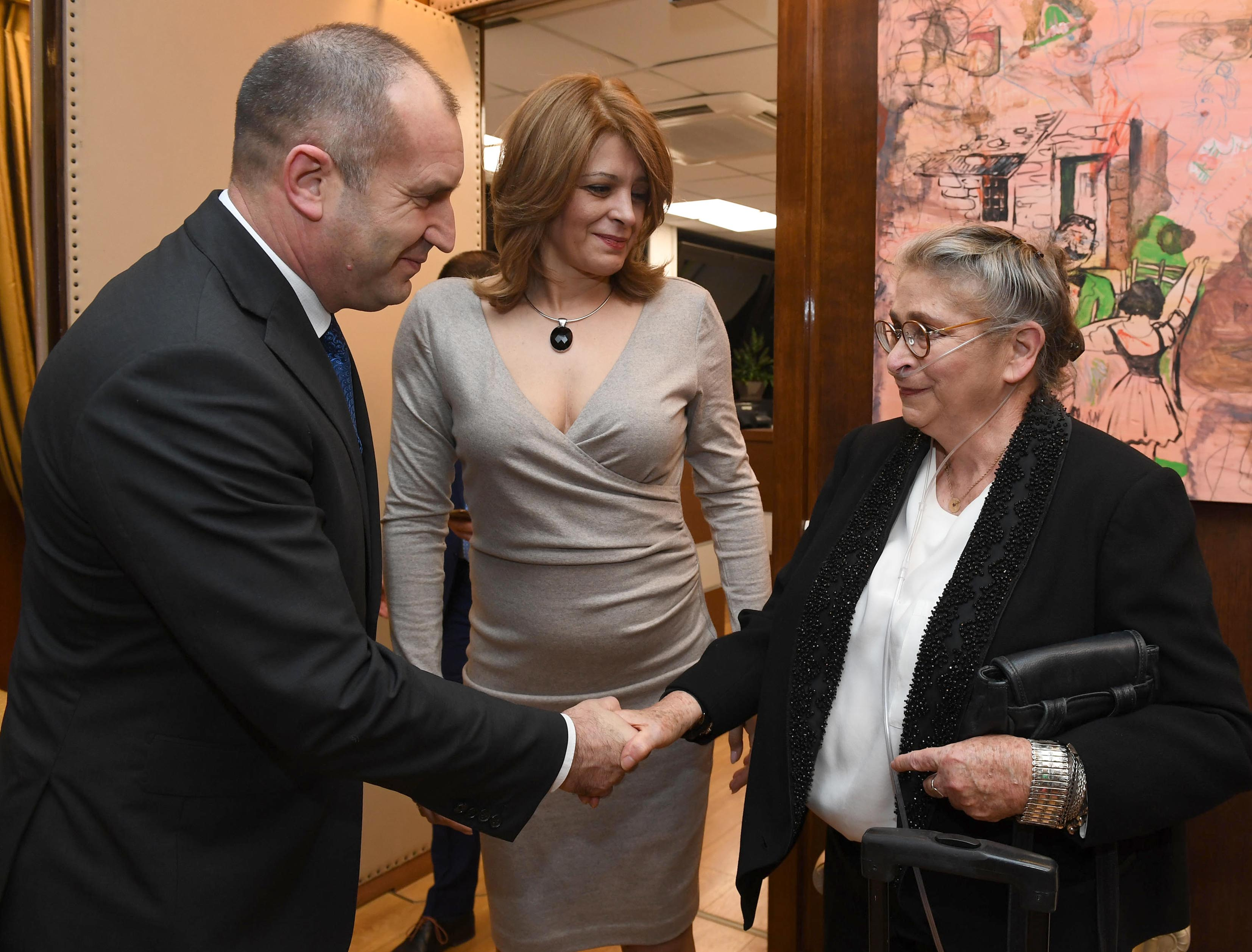
Radeva in Israel
