= Zorka Parvanova =

First Lady of Bulgaria from 2002 to 2012

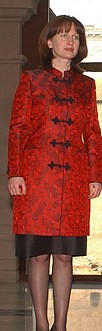

First Lady of Bulgaria
- In office 22 January 2002 – 22 January 2012
- President: Georgi Parvanov
- Preceded by: Antonina Stoyanova
- Succeeded by: Yuliyana Plevnelieva

Personal details
- Born: Zorka Petrova Partsova; 4 May 1958 (age 68) Razlog, Bulgaria
- Party: Non-Partisan
- Spouse: Georgi Parvanov
- Children: Vladimir; Ivaylo

Zorka Petrova Parvanova (née Partsova Bulgarian: Парцова; born 4 May 1958) is a Bulgarian historian and former First Lady of Bulgaria from 2002 until 2012. She is married to Georgi Parvanov, the former President of Bulgaria.

== Early life and career ==
Paravanova was born 4 May 1958 in Razlog. Her education includes a degree from Sofia University in the field of History and Ethnography received in 1982. In addition she received a Ph.D. in History in 1989. From 1997 to 1999, she served as a lecturer at the Varna Free University and the Slavic University in Sofia. She has authored at least 20 publications and monographs. Parvanova is married to Georgi Parvanov. They have two sons, Vladimir and Ivaylo.

== Honours ==
- Belgium : Dame Grand Cordon of the Order of Leopold
- Denmark : Dame Grand Cross of the Order of the Dannebrog (2006)
- Estonia : Order of the Cross of Terra Mariana, 1st Class
- Latvia : Order of the Three Stars, 1st Class
- Portugal: Grand Cross of the Order of Prince Henry (2003)
- Spain : Dame Grand Cross of the Order of Civil Merit (07/06/2003)
- Sweden : Commander Grand Cross of the Order of the Polar Star
