= The Sofia Echo =

Newspaper in Bulgaria

- Type: Weekly newspaper
- Format: Broadsheet
- Owner: Sofia Echo Media
- Headquarters: Sofia, Bulgaria
- Website: sofiaecho.com

The Sofia Echo was a national English-language weekly newspaper published out of Sofia, the capital of Bulgaria, between 1997 and 2012, when it moved to online-only operation at SofiaEcho.com. The website ceased updating a year later.

== History and profile ==
The Sofia Echo began publishing in April 1997, generally targeted at the Bulgarian expatriate community. The newspaper was published by Sofia Echo Media Ltd. A majority stake in the company was bought in 2007 by Bulgarian publisher Economedia. The newspaper was distributed in major Sofia hotels, in outlets throughout the country, as well as in the OMV, Lukoil and Shell petrol stations and the Billa hypermarkets.

From 2005 on, articles from the weekly newspaper were published online with daily news at its website.
