= Maria Zheleva =

First Lady of Bulgaria
- In role 1 August 1990 – 22 January 1997
- President: Zhelyu Zhelev
- Preceded by: Galia Mladenova
- Succeeded by: Antonina Stoyanova

Personal details
- Born: Maria Ivanova Marinova; 3 April 1942 Grozden, Bulgaria
- Died: 8 December 2013 (aged 71) Sofia, Bulgaria
- Spouse: Zhelyu Zhelev (m. 1961)
- Children: 2

Maria Ivanova Marinova-Zheleva (Bulgarian: Мария Иванова Маринова-Желева, 3 April 1942 – 8 December 2013), sometimes transliterated as Mariya Zheleva or Mariya Jeleva, was a Bulgarian historian, film editor, film director, and screenwriter who served as the First Lady of Bulgaria from 1990 until 1997. Zheleva was the wife of Zhelyu Zhelev, the first non-Communist President of Bulgaria following the fall of communism in 1989. She remains the second longest serving first lady in Bulgaria's history.

== Biography ==
Maria Zheleva was born on 3 April 1942 in Grozden, Burgas Province, Bulgaria. She met her husband, Zhelyu Zhelev, in the Sofia University library, where both were students. The couple married in 1961 and had two daughters, Yordanka (1963–1993) and Stanka (born 1966). In 1965, Zhelyu Zhelev was fired from his job and expelled from the Bulgarian Communist Party. As a result, the family moved to Maria Zheleva's home village of Grozden.

Zhelyu Zhelev wrote his most famous book, "The Fascism" (Фашизмът), while living in Grozden. Maria Zheleva was partly responsible for the eventual publication of her husband's book. Zhelev had offered the manuscript of "Fascisim" to several publishing houses, but had been rejected each time. However, In 1978, Maria Zheleva had a chance encounter with Professor Ivan Slavov at a tram stop near Sofia University. Slavov had heard about Zhelev's writings and offered to eventually publish the book through the library and his Komsomol publishing company. Zheleva was skeptical of Slavov's interest, but still provided him with a manuscript and placed him in touch with her husband. Zhelev and Slavov later met, which led to eventual publication of "The Fascism" in 1982. The book was quickly banned by Bulgaria's communist government.

Zheleva was a historian by profession. She spent much of her career as a film editor, film director, and screenwriter for Time (Време), a Bulgarian film studio in Boyana specializing in documentaries and science films. Maria Zheleva continued to work as a filmmaker across Bulgaria while simultaneously serving as First Lady inn the 1990s. In March 1995, First Lady Zheleva and a group of monks were caught making plum brandy by tax collectors while making a film at the Troyan Monastery. The tax collectors had paid a surprise, unannounced inspection of the monastery while Zheleva was filming the documentary on the monk's famous brandy and plum tree groves. The tax authorities were initially going to fine the monks for brewing unauthorized liquor, but Zheleva intervened and produced official documents which explained that the brandy-making was authorized due to the film.

Maria Zheleva was initially reluctant to assume the role of first lady and president's wife once Zhelev became president in 1990. Zheleva confessed that she lost sleep, as well as 15 kilograms, from worrying about her husband and their family. However, she ultimately assumed the role through the transition to democracy, while continuing to pursue her own career in film. In a January 1992 interview, she stated that "I have no ambitions to be his advisor. Thank God, one less advisor to the president! When I talk to him, І want him to hear me, not [just] listen to me." She described herself as a supporter of the president, but also his biggest critic, and noted that her husband became more organized after becoming president. Though Zheleva avoided many of the ubiquitous cocktail parties and disliked being called "first lady", she appeared at the major events and meetings with world leaders required by the roles of president and first lady.

Maria Zheleva died from respiratory and heart failure in the intensive care unit of a Sofia hospital on 8 December 2013, at the age of 71. Zheleva had suffered from lung disease for much of her life. She was buried in her home village of Grozden on 10 December 2013. Her husband, former President Zhelyu Zhelev, died in 2015.
