= Ivo Prokopiev =

Bulgarian businessman

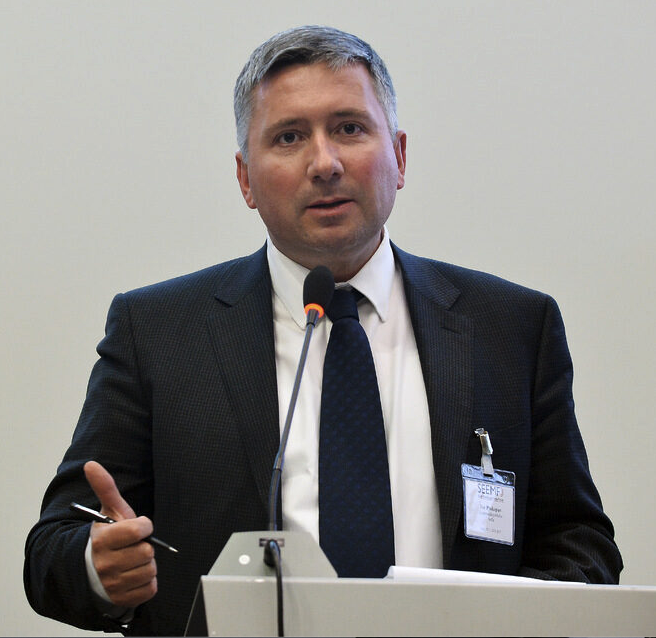
- Born: July 10, 1971 (age 55); Razgrad, Bulgaria
- Education: University of National and World Economy (MiF); INSEAD (MBA)

Ivo Prokopiev (Иво Прокопиев; born July 10, 1971) is a Bulgarian entrepreneur and publisher.

He is the founder and co-owner of Bulgarian holding companies Alfa Finance Holding and Renalfa. He also co-owns the Economedia publishing group, internationally regarded as among the highest‑quality and most independent journalistic outlets in Bulgaria.

Prokopiev holds a master's degree in Finance from the University of National and World Economy in Sofia and an Executive MBA from INSEAD.

== Public commitments ==
During Bulgaria's transition to a free market economy, Prokopiev participated in several significant reforms across both public and private sectors, including the introduction of a currency board, banking-sector restructuring, pension reform strategy, and media self-regulation.

From 2006 to 2010, he served as the first Chairman of the Confederation of Employers and Industrialists in Bulgaria (KRIB), the country's largest business association.

Between 2010 and 2019, Prokopiev held the position of Honorary Consul of Canada in Bulgaria.

== Business ==
Prokopiev co‑founded and served as Chairman of Alfa Finance Holding AD, a leading Bulgarian financial and investment group established in 1999. Over more than 15 years, Alfa Finance invested in, managed, restructured, and developed companies in sectors such as industrial minerals, finance and banking, clean energy, real estate, logistics, infrastructure, telecommunications, and IT. The group expanded across Bulgaria, the Balkans, and Southeast Asia, employing over 3,400 people at its peak. Its portfolio included Kaolin AD, developed into a regional leader in industrial minerals and later sold to Germany's Quarzwerke; Spectrum Net, one of Bulgaria's largest alternative telecoms later acquired by Telekom Austria; and Solarpro, Bulgaria's first publicly listed solar energy company. Alfa Finance became known for acquiring businesses at early growth stages, scaling them to regional significance, and executing successful strategic exits.

Since 2018, Prokopiev has shifted his focus toward Renalfa Solarpro Group GmbH, a Vienna‑based clean energy and e‑mobility investment platform. Renalfa operates through subsidiaries across most EU countries and is one of the leading renewable energy investors in Central and Eastern Europe, with a portfolio exceeding 12 GW of photovoltaic, wind, and battery storage projects.

Prokopiev is also a co-owner in Economedia, one of Bulgaria's largest business media publishers, founded in 1993 by himself and Philip Harmandzhiev. Its flagship weekly, Capital, quickly gained influence as a trusted source for decision‑makers, while its daily Dnevnik was launched in 2001 in a broadsheet format with a dedicated 16‑page "Companies and Finance" section - the largest business section in a Bulgarian newspaper at the time.

Over the years, Economedia has expanded to include a portfolio of print, digital, and business‑to‑business publications reaching more than 1.5 million monthly readers. It is widely regarded as one of the most credible and independent media groups in Bulgaria, playing a significant role in promoting quality journalism, transparency, and democratic discourse.

== Media freedom ==
Since the collapse of the communist regime in Bulgaria, freedom of press has experienced notorious difficulties. International observers such as Reporters Without Borders and the Reuters Institute have highlighted the growing concentration of media ownership and the close entanglement between political elites, household TV Channels like bTV and NOVA, and media outlets. At the center of this media-opoly is oligarch Delyan Peevski, whose New Bulgarian Media Group at one point owned an estimated 80% of Bulgaria's print media and held significant stakes across television and distribution networks. His control over Bulgarian media has drawn international criticism and, in June 2021, both the United States and the United Kingdom imposed Global Magnitsky sanctions on him, citing his involvement in corruption, influence-peddling, and efforts to manipulate media and institutions.

Against this backdrop, Economedia's newspapers Capital and Dnevnik, under the ownership of Prokopiev, have been prominent in investigating and breaking several high-level scandals. Notably, Capital played a central role in uncovering the embezzlement and eventual collapse of the Corporate Commercial Bank (KTB) in 2014 and documenting connections between Peevski and the bank's former owner - a major economic upheaval in Bulgaria. Capital's coverage of Delyan Peevski's brief 2013 appointment as Director of the State Agency for National Security (DANS)(a move protested nationwide) has been credited with helping catalyze the largest public demonstrations since the end of communism in Bulgaria. Economedia also provided leading coverage of the scandals leading up to the 2020–2021 mass protests against corruption under Prime Minister Boyko Borisov, and the police brutality which took place during them, playing a vital role in public accountability.

The EVN case, concerning the 2011 sale of the state's 33% stake in the electricity distributor EVN Bulgaria, is widely regarded by international media watchdogs as a politically motivated attempt to harass Prokopiev for his involvement with independent media. The case was launched more than five years after the sale (raising suspicions about its timing) and claimed that the transaction, handled by Bulbrokers, a firm linked to Prokopiev, caused a loss to the government. Prosecutors based their case largely on a statement Prokopiev made during a 2010 employers' council meeting rather than on concrete evidence of misconduct, leading to charges against Prokopiev, former Finance Minister Simeon Dyankov, and former Economy Minister Traycho Traikov.

In June 2020, in the week leading up to the EVN trial verdict and the potential imprisonment of Prokopiev, Dyankov, and Traykov, international figures such as Christophe Deloire of Reporters Without Borders and former U.S. Secretary of State Madeleine Albright publicly expressed concern over the state of democracy in Bulgaria and voiced support for Prokopiev as a target of politically motivated prosecution.

On 29 June 2020, the EVN trial ended, with the court ruling Prokopiev and all co-defendants innocent. Allegations that they had caused BGN 20 million in state damage were discredited when the court exposed the prosecution's evidence as a patchwork of arbitrary calculations, mixing incompatible valuation methods and misusing basic arithmetic. Judge Velislava Angelova described the result as a "mathematical absurdity".

Furthermore, for over a decade Prokopiev has been subjected to systematic harassment through slander campaigns in tabloids closely associated with Delyan Peevski and members of his political party, the Movement for Rights and Freedoms. Notably, Prokopiev has filed multiple defamation lawsuits, including four separate cases against journalist Nikolay Barekov as well as actions against MRF politicians for repeated public slander.
