= Bojadžiev =

Bojadžiev or Bojadziev (Macedonian: Бојаџиев; feminine Bojadžieva or Boyadzieva) is a surname of Macedonian origin. Notable people with the surname include:

- Duke Bojadziev (born 1972), Macedonian composer, record producer, and pianist
- Gjorgji Bojadžiev (1950–2024), Macedonian general
- Marjan Bojadziev (born 1967), Macedonian economist and banker

== See also ==
- Boyadzhiev, Bulgarian surname
