= Georgi Svilenski =

Bulgarian politician (born 1970)

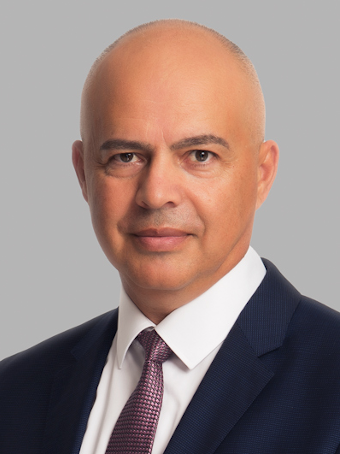
- Official portrait, 2022

Member of the National Assembly
- In office 2014–2024

Personal details
- Born: Georgi Strahilov Svilenski; 9 October 1970 (age 55) Veliko Tarnovo, PR Bulgaria
- Party: Nepokorna Bulgaria (since 2024)
- Other political affiliations: BSP (until 2024)
- Spouse: Desislava Radeva (divorced)
- Children: 1
- Education: University of Architecture, Civil Engineering and Geodesy
- Occupation: Engineer, politician

Georgi Strahilov Svilenski (Bulgarian: Георги Страхилов Свиленски; born 9 October 1970) is a Bulgarian engineer and politician who was a former member of the National Assembly. He was a member of the Bulgarian Socialist Party representing 24-Sofia 2 until 2024.

== Early life and career ==
Born in Veliko Tarnovo on 9 October 1970, Svilenski graduated with a degree in civil engineering from the University of Architecture, Civil Engineering and Geodesy in Sofia. He was previously a member of the Sofia Municipal Council. He was elected to the 43rd Assembly in October 2014, and is a member of the Children, Youths and Sports Committee and Transport, Information Technologies and Communications Committee. He is also a member of the "Friendship alliance" groups with Azerbaijan, China, Montenegro, Russia and Vietnam.

== Personal life ==
Svilenski was married for 13 years to Desislava Gencheva, who is remarried to former Bulgarian president Rumen Radev. He has one son with Gencheva.
