= University of Forestry, Sofia =

State university based in Sofia, Bulgaria

Coordinates: 42.65344°N 23.35898°E

University of Forestry
- Лесотехнически университет
- Type: Public
- Established: 1953
- Rector: Prof. Ivan Iliev
- Academic staff: 6
- Location: Sofia, Bulgaria
- Website: www.ltu.bg

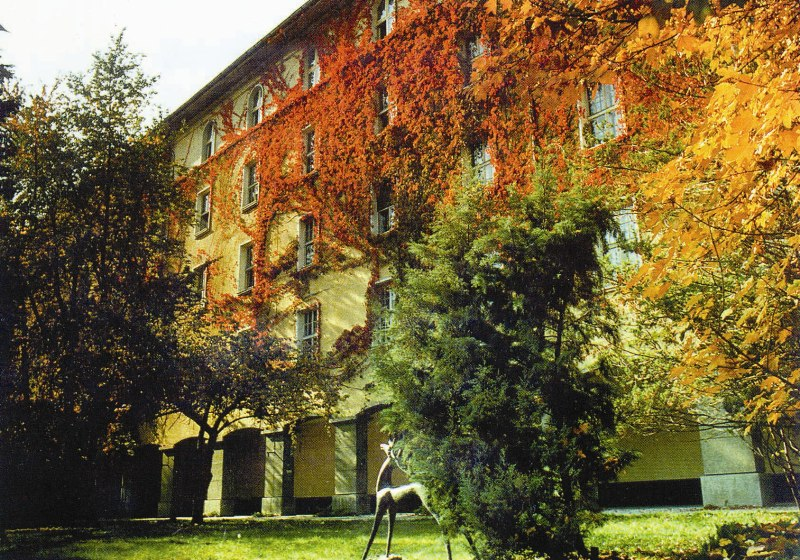
Main building from campus area

The University of Forestry (Bulgarian: Лесотехнически университет (ЛТУ), often abbreviated as LTU), based in Sofia, is a state university with six faculties with a total of 30 departments.

It is located in Sofia, the capital of Bulgaria and is close to the Technical University and the University of Chemical Technology and Metallurgy. The University of Forestry has two Research Forests: the first one located near the village of Yundola in coniferous forest, and the other in the village of Barzia in deciduous forest. It also has a Training and Experimental Field Station in Vrazhdebna suburb of Sofia.

For more than 90 years now, the University of Forestry has been the only university in Bulgaria providing education in forestry, forest management, landscape architecture and wood processing. In the 1990s, the range of scientific fields was expanded to include ecology, agronomy, veterinary medicine and business management.

In mid 1990s, the university adopted the three-level degree system of bachelor, master and doctor degrees. At that time, it also introduced the European Credit Transfer System.

The motto of the university is Bulgarian traditions and European standards in education. As an educational institution the University of Forestry strives to establish an academic environment in which values such as professionalism, freedom of speech and thought, humanism, collaboration and tolerance are encouraged.

== History ==
In 1923, the Faculty of Agronomy at Sofia University (SU) established the Department of Silviculture, preparing the way for the Forestry Division at SU to which the University of Forestry traces its roots. Two years later, in 1925, the Forestry Division at SU was set up, and on 20 February 1925 the Academic Council of SU decided that the division should commence its educational activities by immediately enrolling the first 10 students of forestry.

In 1947, the Forestry Division of SU merged with the Forestry Division of Plovdiv University to establish the Faculty of Forestry at SU. This faculty was one of the four faculties that laid the foundations for setting up the Agricultural Academy in 1947. With Decree of the National Assembly of Bulgaria, dated 12 January 1953, the Agricultural Academy was restructured and three separate universities were established: Georgi Dimitrov Agricultural Academy, the Higher Veterinary Medicine Institute and the Higher Forestry Institute.

The Higher Forestry Institute was renamed the University of Forestry with Decree of the National Assembly of Bulgaria, dated 27 July 1995.

== Faculties ==
The university has the following faculties:

- Faculty of Forestry
- Faculty of Forest Industry
- Faculty of Ecology and Landscape Architecture
- Faculty of Agronomy
- Faculty of Veterinary Medicine
- Faculty of Business Management

== See also ==
- List of colleges and universities
- Sofia

== Gallery ==
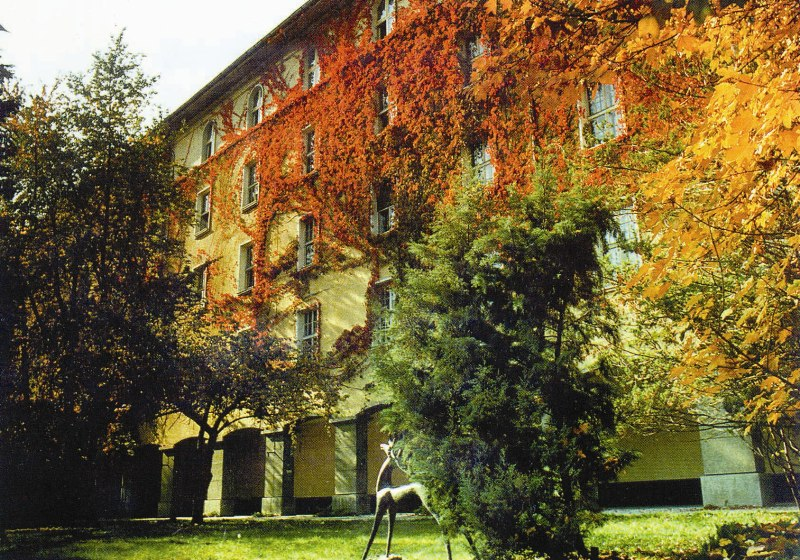
Main building from campus area

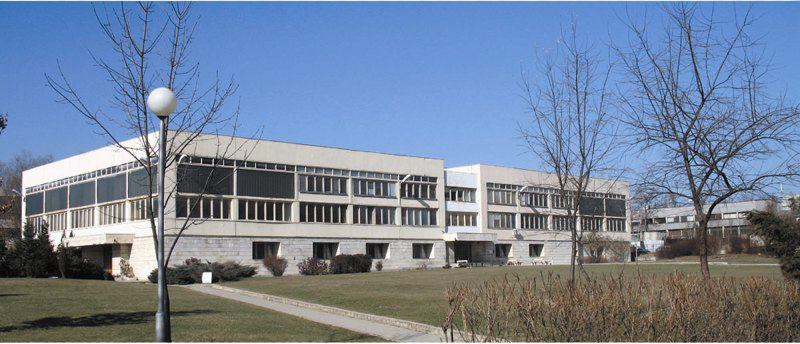
Lecture/presentation wing

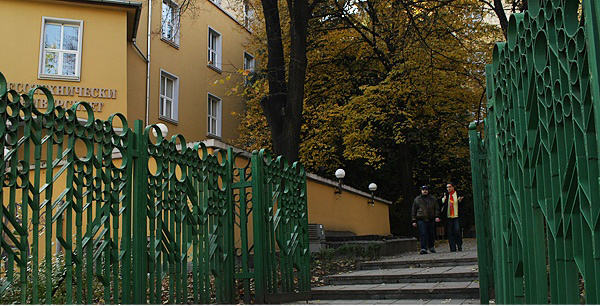
Front entrance to the administrative building

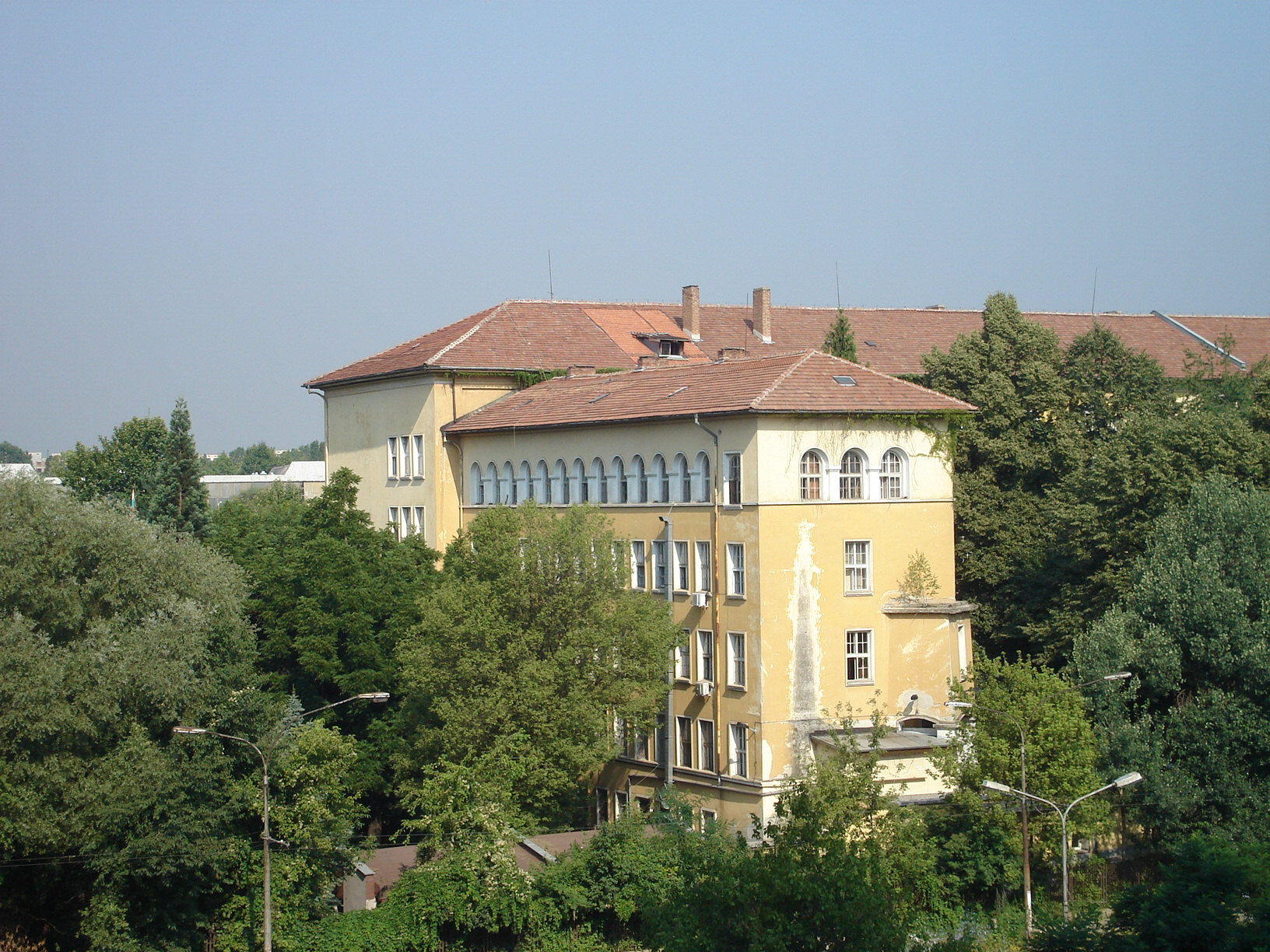
The main campus building
