= Gliese 486 =

Star in constellation of Virgo

Gliese 486 / Gar
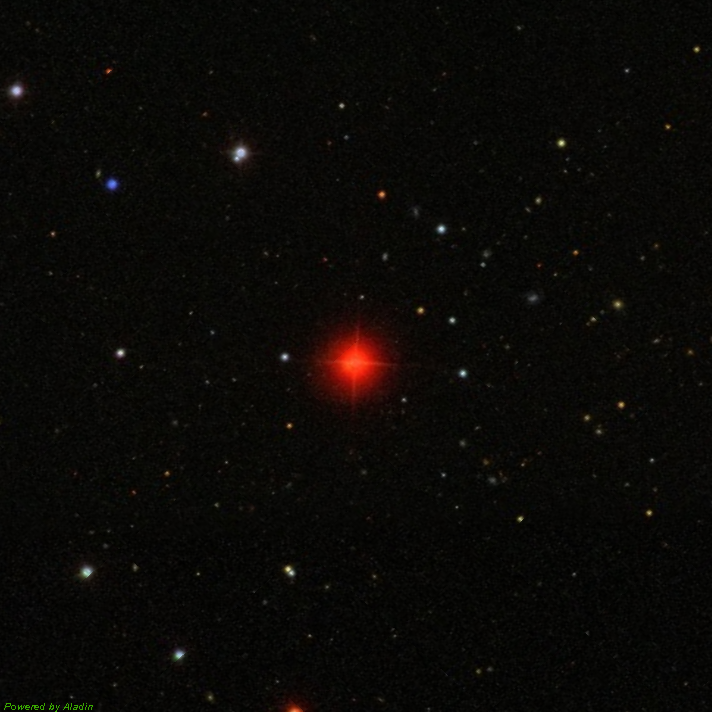
- Gliese 486 imaged by SDSS

Observation data Epoch J2000 Equinox J2000
- Constellation: Virgo
- Right ascension: 12^{h} 47^{m} 56.62457^{s}
- Declination: +09° 45′ 05.0357″
- Apparent magnitude (V): 11.395

Characteristics
- Evolutionary stage: main sequence
- Spectral type: M3.5V

Astrometry
| Radial velocity (R_{v}) | 19.20±0.17 km/s |
| Proper motion (μ) | RA: −1008.267 mas/yr Dec.: −460.034 mas/yr |
| Parallax (π) | 123.7756±0.0329 mas |
| Distance | 26.351 ± 0.007 ly (8.079 ± 0.002 pc) |
| Absolute magnitude (M_{V}) | +11.78 |

Details
| Mass | 0.3120+0.0070 −0.0069 M_{☉} |
| Radius | 0.3243+0.0044 −0.0034 R_{☉} |
| Luminosity | 0.01151+0.00047 −0.00046 L_{☉} |
| Surface gravity (log g) | 4.9111+0.0068 −0.011 cgs |
| Temperature | 3,317+36 −37 K |
| Metallicity [Fe/H] | −0.15+0.13 −0.12 dex |
| Rotation | 49.9±5.5 d |
| Rotational velocity (v sin i) | <2 km/s |
| Age | 1-8 Gyr |

Other designations
- Gar, GJ 486, HIP 62452, Wolf 437, TOI-1827, TYC 882-1111-1, 2MASS J12475664+0945050

Database references
| SIMBAD | data |
| Exoplanet Archive | data |

Gliese 486, also known as Wolf 437 and formally named Gar, is a red dwarf star 26.4 light-years (8.1 parsecs) away in the constellation Virgo. It hosts one known exoplanet, Gliese 486 b.

== Nomenclature ==
The designation Gliese 486 comes from the Gliese Catalogue of Nearby Stars. This was the 486th star listed in the first edition of the catalogue.

In August 2022, this planetary system was included among 20 systems to be named by the third NameExoWorlds project. The approved names, proposed by a team from Spain, were announced in June 2023. Gliese 486 is named Gar and its planet is named Su, after the Basque words for "flame" and "fire".

== Properties ==
Gliese 486 has a surface temperature of 3,317±36 K. Gliese 486 is similar to the Sun in its concentration of heavy elements, with a metallicity Fe/H index of 0.07±0.16. It was suspected to be a flare star, although measurements available in 2019 did not reveal any flares. The chemical makeup of the star is unremarkable and consistent with solar abundances or being slightly metal-poor.

The star has an unremarkable magnetic field in the chromosphere of about 1.6 kilogauss. It is rotating very slowly and is likely to be very old, belonging kinematically to the old thin disk of the Milky Way.

Multiplicity surveys did not detect any stellar companions to Gliese 486 as of 2020.

== Planetary system ==
Gliese 486 hosts one known planet, the close-orbiting rocky super-Earth Gliese 486 b, discovered in 2021. It has been of interest for atmospheric characterization by the James Webb Space Telescope (JWST). JWST observations announced in 2023 detected signs of water vapor, but it was unclear if this was from the planet's atmosphere or from its host star; later observations published in 2024 suggested that the planet likely has little to no atmosphere, so the previous water vapor detection was likely a result of contamination from the host star.

The Gliese 486 planetary system
| Companion (in order from star) | Mass | Semimajor axis (AU) | Orbital period (days) | Eccentricity | Inclination (°) | Radius |
|---|---|---|---|---|---|---|
| b / Su | 2.770+0.076 −0.073 M_{🜨} | 0.01714±0.00013 | 1.46712127+0.00000031 −0.00000035 | 0.00086+0.0016 −0.00043 | 89.39+0.41 −0.42 | 1.289+0.019 −0.014 R_{🜨} |
