= Dnevnik (Bulgarian newspaper) =

Bulgarian newspaper

- Type: Daily newspaper
- Owner(s): Economedia
- Editor-in-chief: Velislava Popova
- Founded: 2001; 24 years ago
- Political alignment: Liberal
- Language: Bulgarian
- Headquarters: Sofia
- Circulation: 12 000 – 15 000
- Sister newspapers: Capital
- ISSN: 1311-7661
- Website: www.dnevnik.bg

Dnevnik (Bulgarian: Дневник, Journal) is a business-oriented Bulgarian daily newspaper, that is published Monday - Friday in Sofia since 2001. Until early 2005, it was printed in broadsheet format, the last Bulgarian daily to use the large format. It adopted a compact format after research in 2005 found that more than 50% of the readers would prefer a smaller, thicker paper. Dnevnik's main editorial line is that the state should intervene less, and that business should have more freedom. Like the influential business and politics weekly Capital, it is published by Sofia-based Economedia.

German publishing group Georg von Holtzbrinck Publishing Group was the owner of a 50 per cent stake in Economedia, but the Bulgarian owners of Economedia bought the shares back in November 2007.

With a print-run of between 12,000 and 15,000, Dnevnik claimed 6,000 paid subscribers, distributed between 2,000 and 5,000 copies free-of-charge and sold about 5,000 copies at newsstands, the publisher's figures showed, adding that each copy had about five readers. In November 2005, Dnevnik launched Morski Dnevnik, a weekly supplement for Bulgaria's Black Sea region with each Friday's paper.

Dnevnik publishes daily web editions in Bulgarian and English and sends a daily summary of the day's top stories by email in either language to anyone who signs up for this free service. It also offers a Bulgarian-language RSS newsfeed.

== Owners and representatives ==
As per Bulgarian Trade register owners of the Dnevnik - Economedia are not disclosed as the company is a joint stock company per registration but directors and representatives are Ivo Georgiev Prokopiev, Philip Michailov Harmandzhiev and Galia Valentinova Prokopieva. Also legal representatives who are not shareholders are: Kostadin Dimitrov Georgiev and Neli Velkova Hristova. Share capital of the company is 6,379,957 BGN (€3.2 mln, or $4.4 mln). The company's liabilities include a drawn €1 mln loan from the Greek Alpha bank.
