= Trifon Trifonov (astronomer) =

Bulgarian astronomer

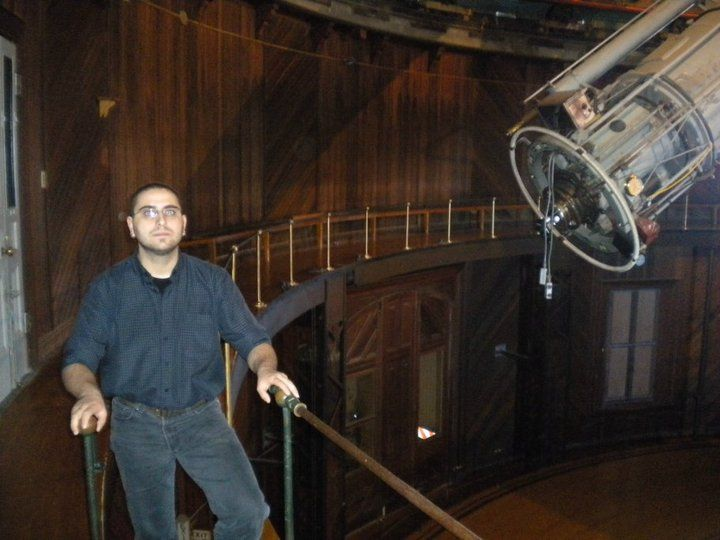
- Trifonov in 2011
- Born: 15 August 1985 (age 40); Blagoevgrad, Bulgaria
- Scientific career
- Fields: Astronomy
- Institutions: Institute of Astronomy "Max Planck" Sofia University

Trifon Trifonov (born 15 August 1985) is a Bulgarian astronomer and astrophysicist, specializing in the discovery and characterization of extrasolar planets (exoplanets). Trifonov holds research positions at the Max Planck Institute for Astronomy (MPIA) in Heidelberg, Germany, and the Department of Astronomy at Sofia University in Bulgaria. His contributions include leading exoplanet discovery teams, developing analytical software, and engaging in multinational partnerships aimed at advancing the study of planets beyond our solar system.

== Research ==
From 2014 to 2016, he worked as a postdoctoral research associate in the Department of Earth Sciences at the University of Hong Kong, expanding his expertise in exoplanet detection techniques. In 2016, he joined the Max Planck Institute for Astronomy in Heidelberg, Germany, as a postdoctoral researcher in the Planet and Star Formation department. At MPIA, he worked under the mentorship of Prof. Thomas Henning, focusing on the discovery and characterization of exoplanetary systems.In addition to his work at MPIA, Trifonov maintains an active role in Bulgarian science. He is a researcher at Sofia University and leads the EXO-RESTART project, a scientific initiative supported by the Bulgarian Science Research Fund of the Ministry of Education and Science, and the Vihren National Science Program.

== Scientific discoveries ==
Trifon Trifonov has been a leading figure in several important exoplanet discoveries. In 2021, he was the lead author of a paper in the journal Science announcing the discovery of Gliese 486b, a rocky super-Earth exoplanet located 26 light-years from Earth. This planet is notable for its potential to retain an atmosphere and for its suitability for detailed atmospheric characterization, making it a valuable target for future studies. Trifonov described it as a potential "Rosetta Stone" for exoplanet science.

In 2025, Trifonov was a co-discoverer of a multi-planet system known as TOI-4504, located approximately 1,100 light-years away. This system includes three new exoplanets and is considered highly important for understanding the evolution of multi-planet systems. He also played a key role in the discovery of two exoplanets orbiting the star TOI-2202. Dr. Trifon Trifonov and an international team of astrophysicists confirmed the discovery of a retrograde planet in the ν Octantis binary star system, a breakthrough detailed in a landmark Nature article published in May 2025. This finding challenges long-held theories about planetary formation in binary systems and highlights the role of stellar evolution in shaping planetary architectures.

His total scientific output includes numerous peer-reviewed publications in top astrophysical journals. He has also developed the open-source software Exo-Striker, which is widely used in the community for modeling and simulating exoplanetary orbits.

== Public engagement ==
Dr. Trifonov is actively involved in public outreach and science communication. He has delivered lectures for both academic and public audiences, including a talk at Sofia University titled "Exoplanet Systems: Chaos and Order Around the Stars." He frequently appears in Bulgarian media to discuss recent astronomical discoveries. Notably, he was interviewed by Bulgarian National Television and Bulgarian National Radio following the discovery of Gliese 486b.

== Awards ==
Trifonov's contributions have earned him international recognition. In 2020, he received the Young Scientist Prize in Physics from the Göttingen Academy of Sciences and Humanities. The award was given in recognition of his outstanding research on extrasolar planets.

== Selected publication ==
First-Author Publications:

- Trifonov, T., et al. (2021). "A nearby transiting rocky exoplanet that is suitable for atmospheric investigation." Science, 371(6533), 1038–1041.
- Trifonov, T., Rybizki, J., & Kürster, M. (2019). "TESS exoplanet candidates validated with HARPS archival data: A massive Neptune around GJ143 and two Neptunes around HD23472." Astronomy & Astrophysics, 622, L7.
- Trifonov, T., et al. (2019). "Two Jovian planets around the giant star HD202696: A growing population of packed massive planetary pairs around massive stars?" Astronomy & Astrophysics, 622, A97.
- Trifonov, T., et al. (2022). "A new third planet and the dynamical architecture of the HD33142 planetary system." Preprint on arXiv.
