= Vladimir Boyadzhiev =

Bulgarian revolutionary

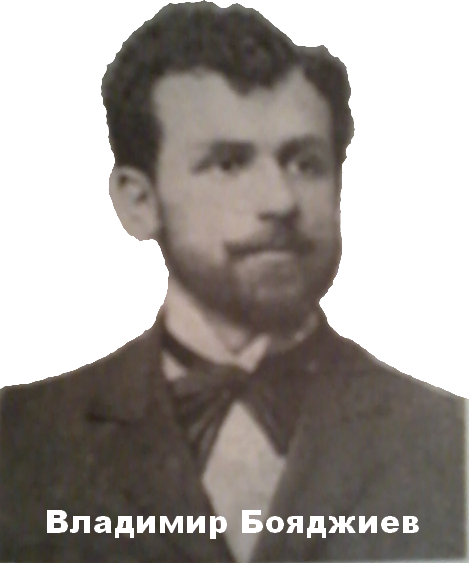
- Portrait of Vladimir Boyadzhiev
- Born: September 30, 1869; Ohrid, Ottoman Empire
- Died: August 3, 1956 (aged 86); Sofia, Bulgaria

Vladimir Boyadzhiev (Bulgarian: Владимир Бояджиев; Macedonian: Владимир Бојаџиев, 30 September, 1869 – 3 August, 1956) was a Bulgarian revolutionary, member of the Internal Macedonian-Adrianople Revolutionary Organization (IMARO). On the eve of the Ilinden-Preobrazhenie Uprising, he was appointed director of the schools in Ohrid and was elected to lead the revolutionary committee.

== Biography ==
Boyadzhiev was born in 1869 in Ohrid, at that time in the Ottoman Empire. In 1893 he graduated in history at the Sofia University in Bulgaria and then went on to work as a teacher in Skopje, Seres, Adrianople and other towns. He taught at the Bulgarian Boy's High School in Adrianople. He joined IMARO and was a member of the Adrianople Revolutionary Committee from 1897 till 1898. Later, he became a member of the District Revolutionary Committee in his hometown Ohrid, where he was a teacher.

After the Ilinden-Preobrazhenie Uprising he was arrested by the Ottoman Authorities in 1904 and in the spring of 1905 was sentenced to four years in prison. He was released due to the general amnesty, announced in 1908 after the Young Turk revolution. Between 1908 and 1912, he taught at the Classical Boys' High School in Bitola. In 1912 he moved to The Kingdom of Bulgaria and became the principal of the High School in Kostenets. Later he taught at the Boys' High School in Pleven (14 years), where he also served as the regional school inspector. Later he became the principal of the High School in Dolni Dabnik. In 1931 he moved to Sofia. Boyadzhiev was awarded the Order of Civil Merit

He had four children, including Elena Boyadzhieva Stantcheva, translator and wife of Bulgarian poet and writer Lachezar Stanchev.
