= Antonina Stoyanova =

Bulgarian lawyer, diplomat, and activist

Antonina Stoyanova Антонина Стоянова
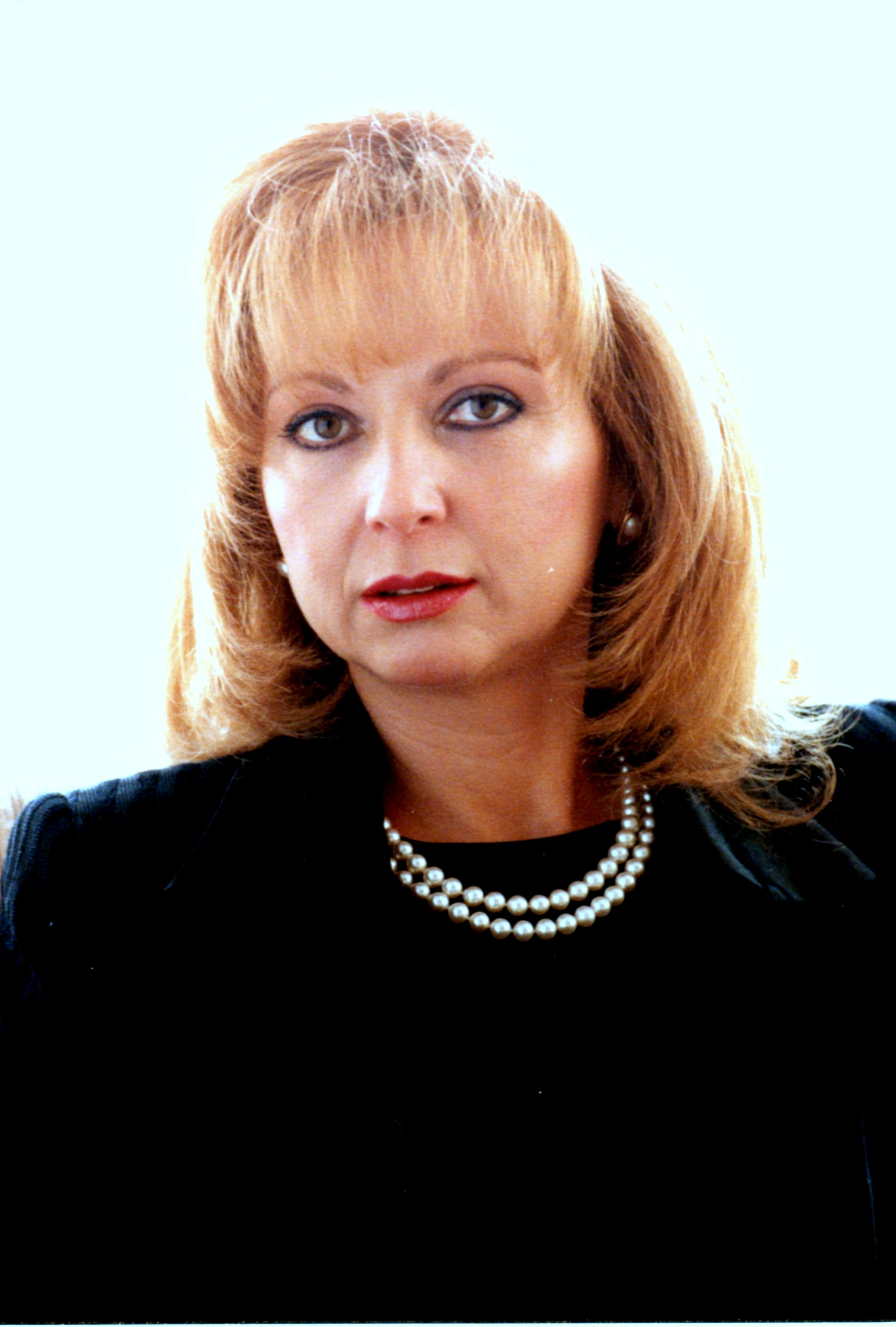

3rd First Lady of Bulgaria
- In role 22 January 1997 – 22 January 2002
- President: Petar Stoyanov
- Preceded by: Maria Zheleva
- Succeeded by: Zorka Parvanova

Personal details
- Born: 17 February 1952 (age 74) Sofia, Bulgaria
- Spouse: Petar Stoyanov
- Children: Stefan; Teofana (Fany)
- Education: University of Leipzig

Antonina Stoyanova (Bulgarian: Антонина Стоянова), née Naydenova, is a Bulgarian IP lawyer, diplomat and social activist, who was the First Lady of Bulgaria between 1997 and 2002, as the wife of the President Petar Stoyanov. She received her law degree and her PhD in international relations from the University of Leipzig.

== Early life ==
Stoyanova was born in Sofia, Bulgaria in a family of Bulgarian intellectuals. One of her grandmothers Maria Sutitch participated in the Bulgarian National Revival (which called for the liberation of Bulgaria from the Ottoman Empire) and fought under the leadership of revolutionary Georgi Benkovski. After completing her high school education at an English language school in Plovdiv, she went to study at the University of Leipzig in Germany, where she completed her Bachelor and Master's degree in international law.

== Professional career ==
She joined the Bulgarian bar in 1979 and practiced law until 1992 when she became a diplomat at the Bulgarian Ministry of Foreign Affairs. Stoyanova spent six months in the USA as part of a Bulgarian legal delegation whose aim was to exchange and accumulate information needed for the drafting of the new democratic Constitution of Bulgaria. In 1992, she practised commercial law in Cologne, Germany. In the same year she joined the diplomatic corps at the Bulgarian Embassy in London, UK where she was in charge of the legal affairs.

In 1996, her husband Petar was elected President of Bulgaria. As a result, she returned to her home country to serve in her official role. While serving as the first lady, Stoyanova distinguished herself by dedicating her activity to social and cultural projects, with her main project, Values Foundation being founded in 1998. Following the end her husbands term as president in 2002, Stoyanova went to work as a lawyer at the World Intellectual Property Organization (WIPO) in Geneva, Switzerland. In 2015, she returned to her home country and renewed her activity as a chairperson of the Values Foundation in Sofia.

== Personal life ==
In 1978, as a trainee at the Plovdiv Regional Court, she met her future husband Petar Stoyanov. They married in 1979. They have two children: Stefan Stoyanov (born in 1979) and Teofana Stoyanova (born in 1990). She is a relative of Hristo Punev, a member of the National Assembly prior to 1944 and Olga Petrova, a notable actress at the Ivan Vazov National Theatre. Stoyanvova is also related to Bulgarian graphic artist Veselin Staikov. A native speaker of the Bulgarian language, Stoyanova also speaks German, English, French and Russian.

== Honours and awards ==
- Sweden: Dame Commander, Grand Cross (2000)
- Denmark: Dame Grand Cross of the Order of the Dannebrog (2000)
- Spain: Order of Civil Merit (1999)
- Greece: Grand Cross of the Order of the Redeemer (1999)
- Japan: Grand Cordon of the Order of the Precious Crown (1997)
- Award of Appreciation by the Association of friends of children with cancer (2015)
