= Gliese 486 b =

Exoplanet in the constellation Virgo

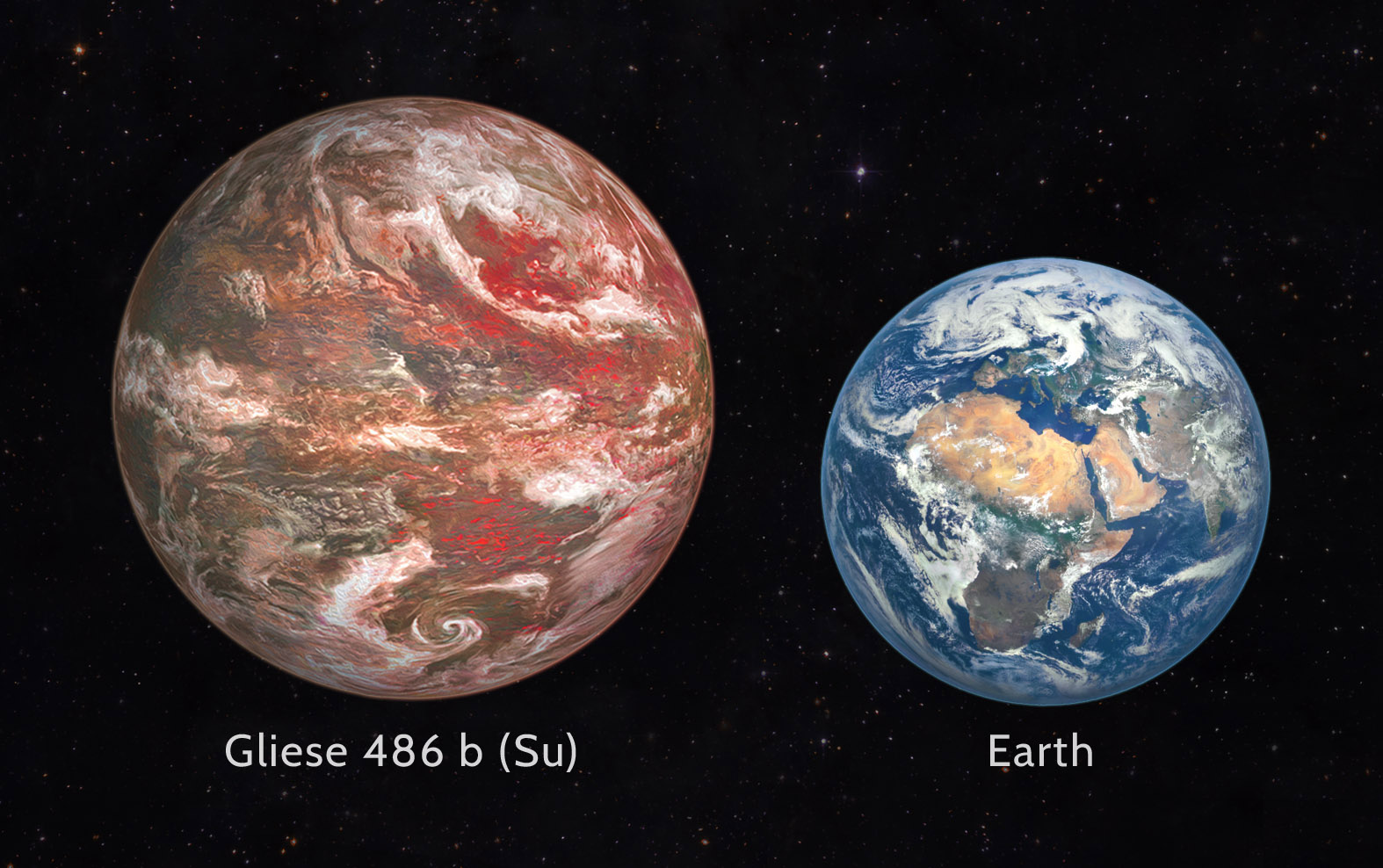
- Artist's impression and size comparison of Gliese 486 b with Earth. In reality, the exoplanet likely has little to no atmosphere.

Discovery
- Discovered by: T. Trifonov, et al.
- Discovery site: Calar Alto Observatory, TESS
- Discovery date: March 2021
- Detection method: Radial velocity, transit

Designations
- Alternative names: Su, GJ 486 b, Wolf 437 b

Orbital characteristics
- Semi-major axis: 0.01714±0.00013 AU
- Eccentricity: 0.00086+0.0016 −0.00043
- Orbital period (sidereal): 1.46712127+0.00000031 −0.00000035 d
- Inclination: 89.39°+0.41° −0.42°
- Argument of periastron: 14°+62° −85°
- Semi-amplitude: 3.389+0.076 −0.075 m/s
- Star: Gliese 486

Physical characteristics
- Mean radius: 1.289+0.019 −0.014 R_{🜨}
- Mass: 2.770+0.076 −0.073 M_{🜨}
- Mean density: 6.66+0.23 −0.29 g/cm^{3}
- Temperature: 696.3+7.2 −7.3 K (423.1 °C; 793.7 °F, equilibrium); 865±14 K (592 °C; 1,097 °F, dayside)

Gliese 486 b, also named Su, is a rocky super-Earth exoplanet orbiting the red dwarf star Gliese 486 (Gar), 26.4 light-years away in the constellation Virgo. It is the only known planet in its system. It is very close to its star, completing an orbit in just 1.5 Earth days. Observations with the James Webb Space Telescope suggest that the planet likely has little to no atmosphere.

== Discovery and naming ==
Gliese 486 b was first detected in radial velocity observations by the CARMENES spectrograph, which observed its host star between 2016 and 2020. Observations by the TESS space telescope showed that the planet transits the star, allowing its size to be determined; combined with the mass measured by radial velocity, this indicated that it is a rocky planet. The MAROON-X spectrograph also contributed to the discovery, which was its first science result. The discovery was announced in March 2021 by a team of astronomers led by T. Trifonov and J. A. Caballero.

The designation Gliese 486 b indicates the first planet discovered orbiting Gliese 486, as per exoplanet naming convention. This planet and its host star were included among the 20 systems selected to be named in the third NameExoWorlds campaign, beginning in August 2022. The approved names, announced in June 2023, were proposed by a team based in Spain that included Trifonov and Caballero. The planet is named Su and its host star is named Gar, after the Basque words for "fire" and "flame", in reference to the Basque saying "su eta gar" (fire and flame) which signifies passion and enthusiasm. As with other named exoplanets, astronomers have continued to use the original designation.

== Characteristics ==
Artist's impression of the surface of Gliese 486 b (2021)

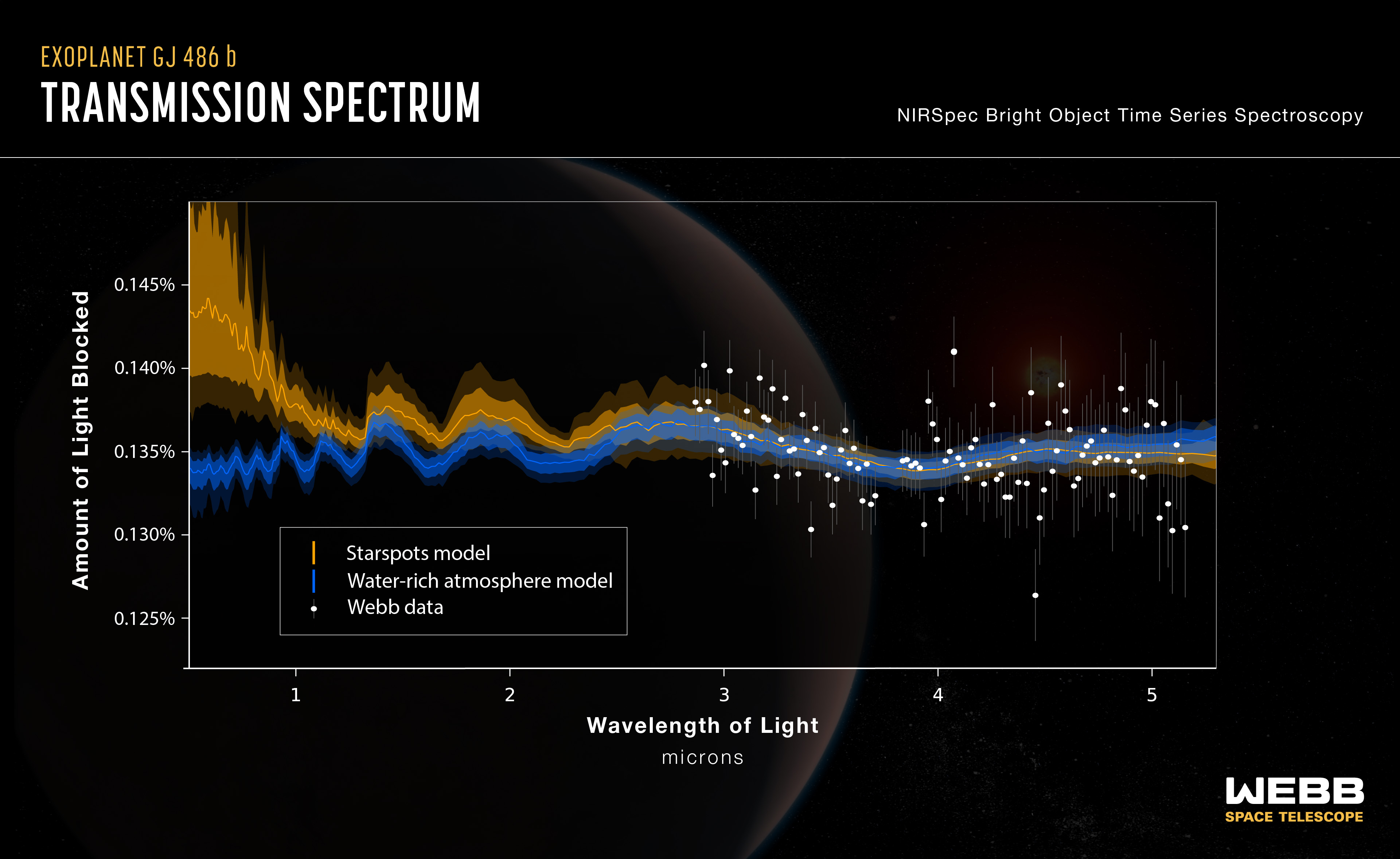
JWST transmission spectrum of Gliese 486 b (2023)

Gliese 486 b orbits very close to its star, at a distance of 0.017 AU (2.5 million km; 1.6 million mi) and an orbital period of 1.47 Earth days; for comparison, Mercury orbits at a distance of 0.387 AU (57.9 million km; 36.0 million mi) from the Sun with a period of 88 days. The orbit is nearly circular, with a very low eccentricity. The orbital inclination of 89.4° to the plane of the sky means the orbit is edge-on, allowing a transit to be observed.

Gliese 486 b is classified as a super-Earth, with 2.77 times Earth's mass and 1.29 times its radius. This indicates a density of 6.66 g/cm^{3}, consistent with a rocky, terrestrial planet. Due to its close orbit, the planet is very hot, with a measured temperature on the day side of around 865 K (592 °C; 1,097 °F).

=== Atmosphere ===
Gliese 486 b is of interest as a rocky exoplanet suitable for atmospheric characterization with telescopes such as the James Webb Space Telescope (JWST). It can be used to constrain the position of the "cosmic shoreline", the theoretical boundary between planets with and without atmospheres. A ground-based 2022 study ruled out the presence of a cloudless hydrogen/helium-dominated atmosphere or a 100% water vapor atmosphere; a secondary planetary atmosphere with a higher molecular weight remained a possibility. Observations with JWST announced in 2023 detected signs of water vapor, but it was unclear if this was from the planet's atmosphere or from starspots on its host star.

JWST observations of the planet's secondary eclipse published in 2024 found a planetary dayside temperature of 865±14 K (592 °C; 1,097 °F). This is consistent with a lack of heat redistribution, indicating that the planet likely has little to no atmosphere and the previous water vapor detection was likely a result of contamination from the host star. Gliese 486 b thus appears similar to other hot rocky planets around red dwarfs, such as LHS 3844 b (Kua'kua), GJ 1252 b, TRAPPIST-1b, Gliese 367 b (Tahay) and GJ 1132 b.
