= Pepka Boyadjieva =

Bulgarian researcher

Professor Pepka Boyadjieva
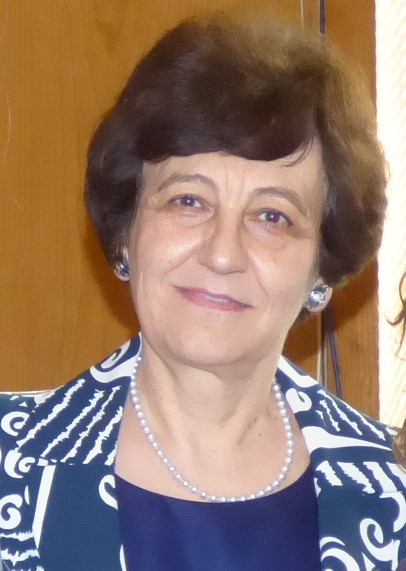
- Pepka Boyadjieva in 2015
- Born: 26 December 1954 (age 71); Montana, Bulgaria
- Citizenship: Bulgarian
- Spouse: Tzocho Boyadjiev
- Awards: Fulbright Program, Andrew Mellon Award

Academic background
- Education: Sofia University

Academic work
- Discipline: Sociology
- Sub-discipline: Sociology of education
- Institutions: Bulgarian Academy of Sciences

Pepka Boyadjieva is Professor of Sociology at the Institute of Philosophy and Sociology, Bulgarian Academy of Sciences. Chair of the Scientific Council of the Institute for the Study of Societies and Knowledge (2011 – 2019) and of Institute of Philosophy and Sociology (since 2019). Vice-chair of the General Assembly of the Bulgarian Academy of Sciences (2016 – 2020); President of the Bulgarian Sociological Association (2003 – 2006). Expert for the European Commission and Permanent Senior Fellow at Center for Advanced Studies, Sofia (2006 – 2018). Member of the editorial board of the International Sociological Association’s edition Sage Studies in International Sociology (2010 – 2019), board member of International Journal of Lifelong Education since 2008 and of Journal of Social Science Education since 2009. Honorary Professor of Sociology of Education at the University of Nottingham; Professor of Sofia University and New Bulgarian University. Her research interests are in the fields of inequalities in education; social justice and education; education, science and social modernization; university and society; lifelong and adult learning; public representation and images of science and scientists.

== Biography ==
Pepka Alexandrova Boyadjieva was born on December 26, 1954, in the then town of Mihailovgrad, now Montana, Bulgaria. She graduated in philosophy with a specialization in sociology in 1976 at Sofia University, defended her PhD dissertation in 1980, and the next one for Doctor Habilis of Sociological Sciences in 1999. Her professional career developed mainly at the Institute of Sociology at the Bulgarian Academy of Sciences, where she has held the Senior Research Fellow I degree since 2000. She has chaired the Scientific Council of the Institute for the Study of Societies and Knowledge(renamed as Institute of Philosophy and Sociology in 2019) since 2011 and previously chaired the Scientific Council of the Institute of Sociology from 2004 to 2008. She was a Permanent Senior Fellow at the Center for Advanced Studies, Sofia (2006 – 2018). Professor at the Institute of Philosophy and Sociology since 2010, Honorary Professor of Sociology of Education at the University of Nottingham since 2011. She was President of the Bulgarian Sociological Association (2003 – 2006). She has been lecturing a course on Sociology of Education since 1994 at Sofia University and delivered courses on University Worlds, Institutions of Knowledge and Sociology of Education at New Bulgarian University.

Boyadjieva engages in civic activism and social development policies and has been an expert on governmental and non-governmental reform initiatives. She was a long-time expert at the Open Society Institute, Sofia and is currently chairing its board of trustees. She is one of the authors of the current Strategy for the Development of Higher Education in the Republic of Bulgaria 2021–2030. She is a member of “Education without Barriers” Association.

== Research accomplishments ==
Boyadjieva took part in more than 30 research projects. She is the only representative of social sciences who won a grant for a research project from the National Research Program "Outstanding Studies and People for the Development of European Science" (in Bulgarian - NNP "VIHREN") in 2019. The theme of this 5-year project is "Dynamics of Inequalities in Higher Education and Adult Learning: A Comparative Analysis of Social Justice". Since 2005 she has been acting as evaluator and independent expert for the European Commission. She is a member of the international networks of experts of social dimension of education and learning at the NESET and NESSE.

Since 2000 – her citations in Google Scholar by 2021 are over 830 for nearly 300 publications since 1997 with H-index 14, and 273 citations and H-index 7 according to SCOPUS. According to the ResearchGate, she has a personal score of 20.91.

== Awards and honors ==
The Bulgarian Academy of Sciences presented Boyadjieva with the Marin Drinov ribbon badge of honour in 2021. Boyadjieva received the Cyril O. Houle Award from the American Association for Adult and Continuing Education in 2022. In 2023 Boyadjieva received the National Pythagoras Award from the Bulgarian Ministry of Education and Science. She was named an honorary professor at the University of Nottingham in 2023.

== Selected works ==
Authored and co-authored books

- Boyadjieva, P.; Ilieva-Trichkova, P. (2021). Adult Education as Empowerment: Re-Imagining Lifelong Learning through the Capability Approach, Recognition Theory and Common Goods Perspective. London: Palgrave Macmillan. ISBN 978-3-030-67136-5.
- Boyadjieva, P.; Boyadjiev, Tz. (2021). The Vanished Universities. Towards a Sociology of Failure (in Bulgarian). Sofia: Sofia University Publishing House. ISBN 978-954-07-5364-5.
- Boyadjieva, P.; Kabakchieva, P. (2019). (Un)possible Syndicalism. Builders and Teachers during Communism (in Bulgarian). Sofia: Ciela. ISBN 9789542827962.
- Boyadjieva, P.; KMilenkova, V.; Gornev, G.; Petkova, K.; Nenkova, D. (2019). The LLL Hybrid: Policy, Institutions and Learners in Lifelong Learning in Bulgaria (in Bulgarian). Sofia: Ciela. ISBN 978-6191520152.
- Boyadjieva, P. (2010). Social Engineering: Admission Policies in Higher Education during the Communist Regime in Bulgaria. Sofia: CIELA (in Bulgarian) ISBN 9789542808138
- Boyadjieva, P. (1998). University and Society: Two Sociological Cases. Sofia: LIK (in Bulgarian) ISBN 954-607-180-3
- Boyadjieva, P., Gerganov, E., Paspalanova, E., Petkova, K. (1994). Education outside the School Doors. Sofia: Gal Iko (in Bulgarian) ISBN 954-8010-51-8
- Boyadjieva, P., Petkova, K., Chalakov, I. (1994). Science: Life outside the Laboratory. Sofia: Bulgarian Academy of Sciences Press (in Bulgarian) ISBN 9544302379
- Boyadjieva, P. (1992). The Birth of the University. Sofia: Kritika i humanism (in Bulgarian).
- Boyadjieva, P. (1985). What Can Education Give Us? Sofia: Nauka i Iskustvo (in Bulgarian).

Edited books

- Koleva, S., Boyadjeiva, P., Kabakchieva, P., Kolarova, R. (Eds.) (2021). Bringing down Barriers. Disciplines, Epochs, Generations. Sofia: University Publishing House “St. Kl. Ohridski” (In Bulgarian) ISBN 978-954-07-5181-8
- Boyadjieva, P., Kanoushev, M., Ivanov, M. (2018) (Eds.). Inequalities and Social (Dis)integration: In Search of Togetherness. Sofia: Iztok-Zapad (In Bulgarian and English) ISBN 978-619-01-0188-8
- Boyadjieva, P., Stoyanova, R. (Eds.) (2017). The Gift and Cultures of Giving for Education: Theories Institutions, Individuals. Sofia: Iztok-Zapad (In Bulgarian and English)
- Burnaski, G., Boyadjieva, P., Kabakchieva, P. (2015). (Eds.). State Security - Unions, Business life and Workers. Documentary collection. Sofia: KRDOPBGDSRSBNA and Research Institute of the Recent Past (In Bulgarian) ISBN 978-954-2986-70-6
- Boyadjieva, P. Koleva, S., Koev, K. (2006). (Eds.) Worlds in Sociology. Sofia: Sofia University Publishing House (in Bulgarian) ISBN 9540724589
- Boyadjieva, P. (1999) (Ed.) University Autonomy and Academic Responsibility. Sofia: LIK (in Bulgarian)
- Boyadjieva, P. (1999) (Ed.) Dimensions of the University Idea. Sofia: Sofia University Publishing House (in Bulgarian) ISBN 954-07-0219-4

Selected articles and book chapters

- Boyadjieva, P.; Ilieva-Trichkova, P. (2022). "Does participation in non-formal adult education matter for individual subjective well-being as a multidimensional functioning?". European Educational Research Journal. 23: 125–144. doi:10.1177/14749041221116261. S2CID 252812552.
- Boyadjieva, P. (2022). "(Un)avoidable clash: higher education at the altar of its missions and rankings". In Parreira do Amaral, M.; Thompson, Ch. (eds.). Geopolitical Transformations in Higher Education. Imagining, Fabricating and Contesting Innovation. Educational Governance Research. Vol. 17. Springer. pp. 125–142. doi:10.1007/978-3-030-94415-5_8. ISBN 978-3-030-94414-8.
- Boyadjieva, P.; Ilieva-Trichkova, P. (2019). "From conceptualisation to measurement of higher education as a common good: challenges and possibilities" (PDF). Higher Education. 77 (6): 1047–1063. doi:10.1007/s10734-018-0319-1. S2CID 254538895.
- Boyadjieva, P. (2017). Cultures of giving in the sphere of education: theoretical frameworks and research approaches. In: Boyadjieva, P., Stoyanova, R. (Eds.) (2017). The Gift and Cultures of Giving for Education: Theories Institutions, Individuals. Sofia: Iztok-Zapad, 27-62 (In Bulgarian).
- Boyadjieva, P. (2013). Admission Policies as a Mechanism for Social Engineering: The Case of the Bulgarian Communist Regime, Comparative Education Review 57 (3): 503–526. doi:10.1086/670728
