= Ivan Boyadzhiev =

Bulgarian footballer

Personal information
- Date of birth: 12 July 1938 (age 88)
- Place of birth: Sevlievo, Bulgaria
- Position: Defender

Senior career*
Years	Team	Apps	(Gls)
1957–1958	Lokomotiv Sofia	15	(0)
1959–1971	Lokomotiv Plovdiv	216	(2)

International career
1964	Bulgaria	1	(0)
- * Club domestic league appearances and goals

Ivan Boyadzhiev (Bulgarian: Иван Бояджиев; born 12 July 1938) is a Bulgarian former football defender.
