= First ladies and gentlemen of Bulgaria =

Spouse of the president of Bulgaria

First Lady of Bulgaria First Gentleman of Bulgaria
- Coat of arms of Bulgaria
- Incumbent; Andrey Yotov as First Gentleman since 23 January 2026
- Residence: Largo, Sofia
- Term length: Concurrent with the president's term (unless a divorce or death takes place)
- Inaugural holder: Mariya Zheleva
- Formation: 17 November 1989

First Lady of Bulgaria (Bulgarian: Първа дама на България, romanized: Parva dama na Balgariya) or First Gentleman of Bulgaria is an unofficial honorific applied to the spouse of the president of Bulgaria. Officially, her term as first lady is concurrent with her husband's term in office. The first lady often accompanies the head of state during state visits and official functions. The title of First Lady was first used in Bulgaria in the early 1990s, following the example of the United States.

The current first gentleman of the Republic of Bulgaria is Andrey Yotov, the husband of the 6th president of Bulgaria, Iliana Iotova. At present, there have been five first ladies of the Republic of Bulgaria, including Radeva.

== Spouses of the general secretary of the Bulgarian Communist Party ==
- Roza Yulievna – (27 December 1948 – 2 July 1949)
- Elena Dimitrova – (15 July 1949 – 26 January 1954)
- Mara Maleeva-Zhivkova – (4 March 1954 – 23 October 1971)
- Position Vacant – (23 October 1971 – 10 November 1989)
- Galya Mladenova (10 November 1989 – 2 February 1990)

== List of first ladies and gentlemen ==
Image	Name	Term	President
	Maria Zheleva	1 August 1990 – 22 January 1997	Zhelyu Zhelev
	Antonina Stoyanova	22 January 1997 – 22 January 2002	Petar Stoyanov
	Zorka Parvanova	22 January 2002 – 22 January 2012	Georgi Parvanov
	Yuliyana Plevnelieva	22 January 2012 – 22 January 2017	Rosen Plevneliev
	Desislava Radeva	22 January 2017 – 23 January 2026	Rumen Radev
	Andrey Yotov	23 January 2026 - present	Iliana Iotova
