= Manuela Bojadžijev =

German sociologist (born 1971)

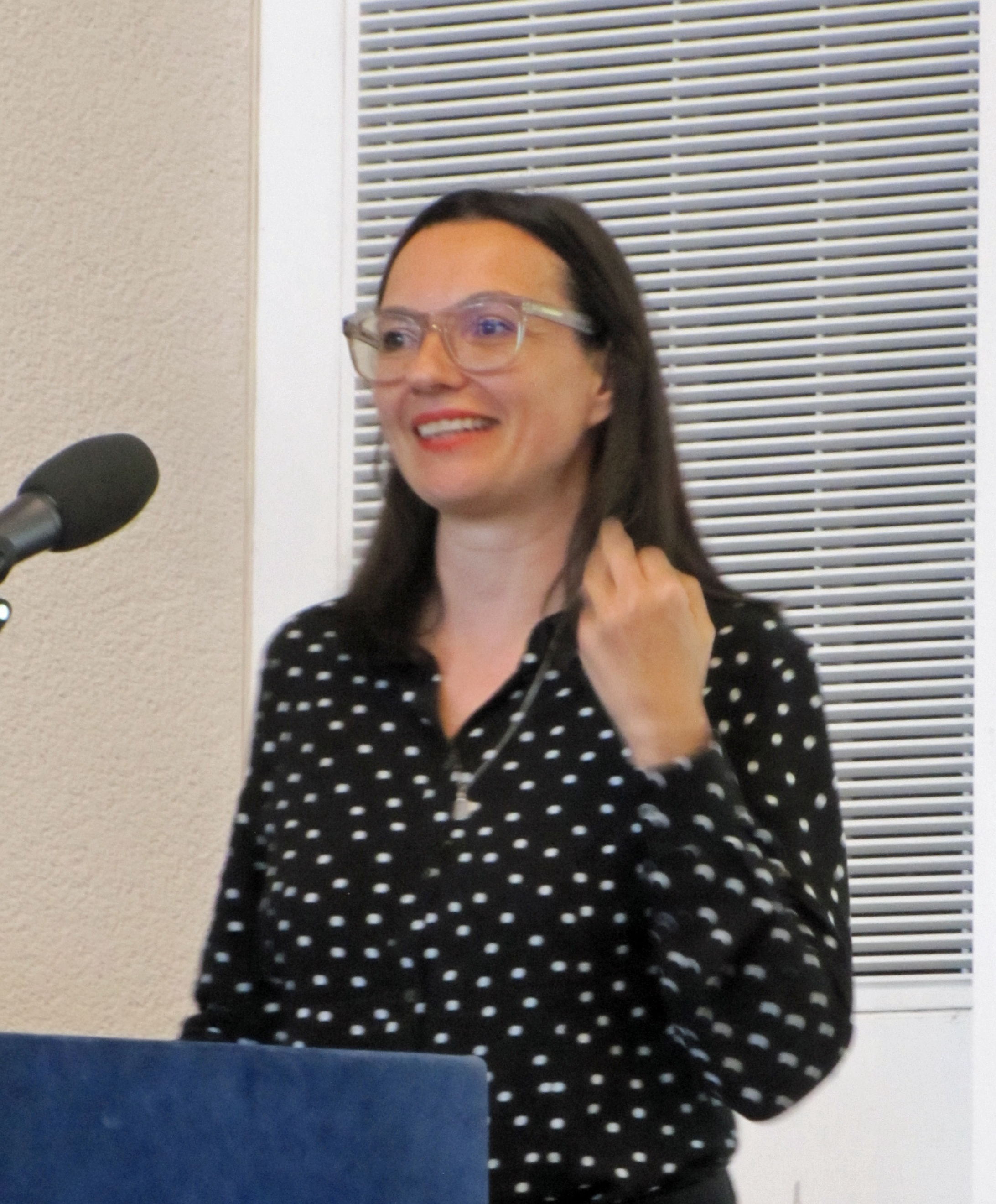
- Manuela Bojadžijev in 2019
- Born: 1971 (age 54–55)
- Employer: Humboldt University of Berlin

Manuela Bojadžijev (born 1971) is a German academic. She is Professor of Culture and Lifestyles in Immigration Societies at the Institute for European Ethnology at Humboldt University of Berlin. Her research focuses on racism and migration theory, the study of globalized and digital cultures, European migration history, and postcolonial studies. She is a co-founder of Kanak Attak in Germany.

== Biography ==
Manuela Bojadžijev studied political science, sociology, and philosophy at the Johann Wolfgang Goethe University Frankfurt am Main until 1996, graduating with a Master of Arts degree with a thesis on "Critique of Politics". She then earned her doctorate in political science from the same university in 2006 with a dissertation entitled "The Shady International: Racism and Struggles of Migration". From 2007 to 2008, she taught at the Department of Sociology at Goldsmiths, University of London, and subsequently worked as a research associate at the Free University of Berlin. From 2010 to 2015, she held a postdoctoral position at the Institute for European Ethnology at Humboldt University of Berlin. From 2015 to 2020, Bojadžijev was a junior professor of globalized cultures at the Faculty of Cultural Studies at Leuphana University of Lüneburg. Since 2018, she has been Vice Director of the Berlin Institute for Empirical Integration and Migration Research (BIM) at Humboldt University of Berlin. Since 2020, she has been Professor of "Culture and Lifestyles in Immigration Societies" at the Institute for European Ethnology at Humboldt University.

In May 2024, she signed the statement by lecturers at Berlin universities. In it, 250 university professors protested the police clearing of a pro-Palestinian protest camp on the grounds of the Free University of Berlin. They criticized the violation of the duty to protect his own students by FU President Günter Ziegler, who had ordered the clearing without prior offer of dialogue, citing fundamental democratic rights such as "freedom of assembly and expression." The signatories emphasized in the statement that this applied regardless of the content of the demonstrators' demands or the chosen form of protest, and regardless of whether they personally shared these demands or no. In mid-June 2024, Bojadžijev, along with several thousand other professors and lecturers, called for the resignation of the Minister of Education and Research, Bettina Stark-Watzinger, due to her considerations regarding the sanctioning of university staff.

== Memberships ==
- Part of the TRANSIT MIGRATION research group 2002–2006.
- Co-Head of Department “Integration, social networks and cultural lifestyles” at the Berlin Institute for Empirical Integration and Migration Research (BIM) of Humboldt University, since 2018.
- Head of the DAAD-funded project “Between Logistics and Migration: Duisburg and the New Silk Road” (2017–2018).
- Head of the DFG-funded research project “Digitalization of Work. Configurations of Real and Virtual Migration” (2018–2021).
- Part of the interdisciplinary research group “Transforming Solidarities. Practices and Infrastructures in a Migration Society” (since 2021).
- Member of the jury for "General Project Funding" of the Federal Cultural Foundation.

== Publications (selection) ==
- Manuela Bojadžijev and Alex Demirović (Hrsg.): Konjunkturen des Rassismus, Westfälisches Dampfboot Verlag, Münster 2002, ISBN 978-3-89691-516-0.
- Manuela Bojadžijev als Teil der TRANSIT MIGRATION Forschungsgruppe (Hrsg.): Turbulente Ränder. Neue Perspektiven auf Migration an den Grenzen Europas, Transcript Verlag, Bielefeld 2007, ISBN 978-3-8394-0781-3. (Zweite Auflage: 2009)
- Manuela Bojadžijev: Die windige Internationale, Westfälisches Dampfboot Verlag, Köln 2007, ISBN 978-3-89691-667-9. (Zweite Auflage: 2012)
- Moritz Altenried, Manuela Bojadžijev, Leif Jannis Höfler, Mira Wallis and Sandro Mezzadra (Hrsg.): Logistische Grenzlandschaften: Das Regime mobiler Arbeit nach dem „Sommer der Migration“, Unrast Verlag, Münster 2017, ISBN 978-3-89771-233-1.
- Manuela Bojadžijev, Katrin Klingan and Philippe Rekacewicz (Hrsg.): Race, Nation, Class: Rereading a Dialogue for our Times, Argument Verlag, Hamburg 2018, ISBN 978-3-86754-511-2.
- Jens Adam, Manuela Bojadzijev, Michi Knecht, Pawel Lewicki, Nurhak Polat, Regina Römhild and Rika Spiekermann (Hrsg.): Europa dezentrieren: Globale Verflechtungen neu denken, Campus Verlag, Frankfurt am Main 2019, ISBN 978-3-593-50757-6.
