= Capital (Bulgarian newspaper) =

Bulgarian weekly newspaper

- 11–17 December 2010 issue
- Type: Weekly newspaper
- Owner(s): Economedia
- Founder(s): Ivo Prokopiev
- Editor-in-chief: Alexei Lazarov / Teodora Vassileva
- Founded: 1993
- Political alignment: Liberal
- Language: Bulgarian
- Headquarters: Sofia
- ISSN: 1310-7984
- Website: www.capital.bg

Capital (Bulgarian: Капитал) is a weekly newspaper in Bulgaria.

The first issue of Capital was put out in 1993.

A redesign in 2006 has left the main body of the newspaper structured into four parts.

Various business-to-business events are organized under the Capital brand.

== History and profile ==
Capital was established in 1993. As of 2002, Capital was part of Georg von Holtzbrinck Publishing Group who owned part of the Economedia publishing company. In November 2007 the Bulgarian owners of Economedia bought the shares back.
