= Sofia University =

Public university in Sofia, Bulgaria

- Софийски университет
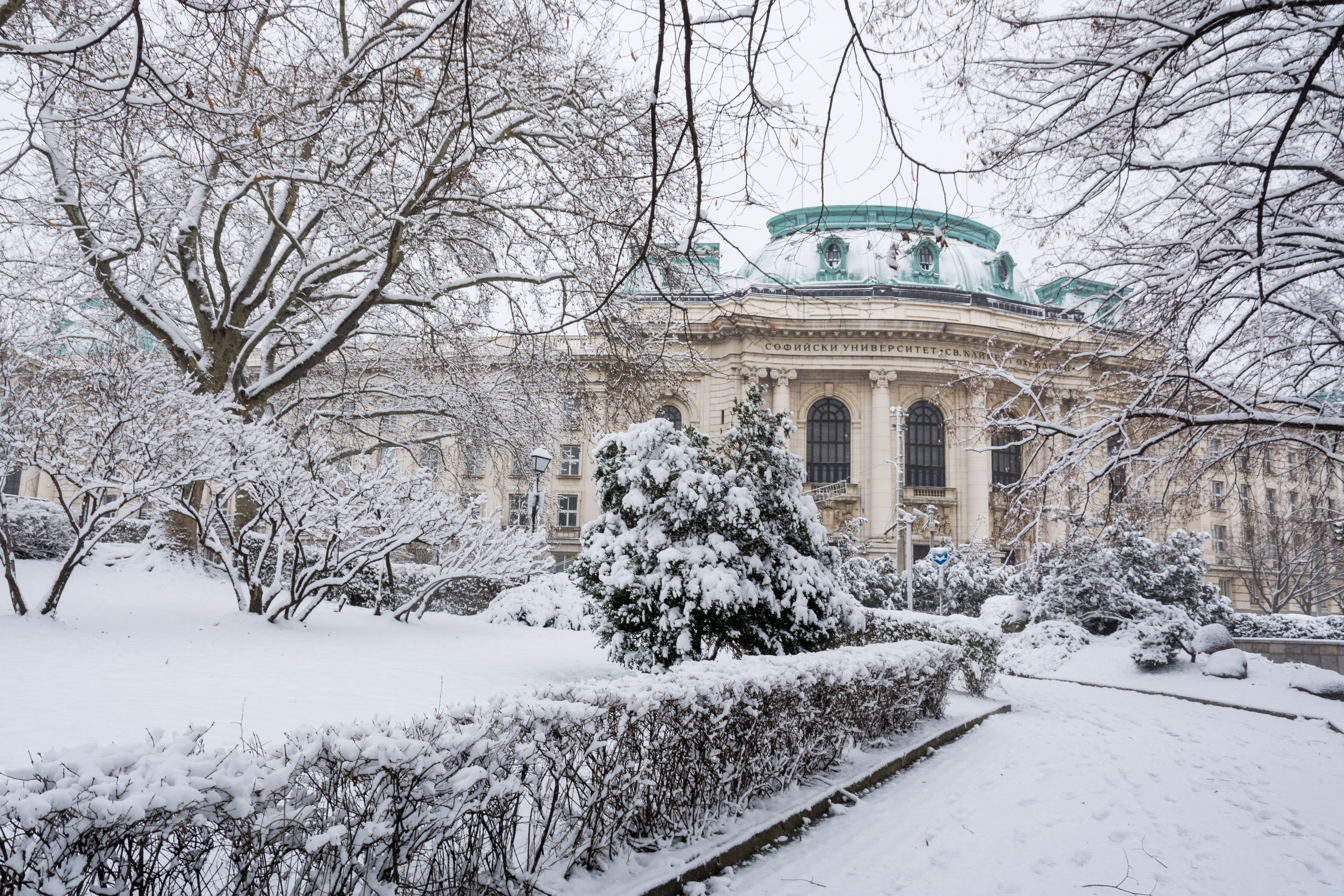
- Former name: Higher Pedagogical Course
- Motto: Ipsa scientia potestas est
- Motto in English: Knowledge itself is power
- Type: Public
- Established: 1 October 1888
- Affiliations: EUA
- Endowment: $125 million
- Rector: Georgi Valchev
- Academic staff: 1,700
- Students: 21,000 (2023)
- Location: 15 Tsar Osvoboditel Boulevard, Sofia, Bulgaria; 42°41′37″N 23°20′6″E
- Campus: Urban
- Language: Bulgarian
- Colors: Purple
- Website: uni-sofia.bg

University rankings

Global – Overall
- QS World: 731-740 (2026)
- THE World: > 800 (2020)

Regional – Overall
- QS Emerging Europe and Central Asia: 44 (2022)

Sofia University "St. Kliment Ohridski" (Bulgarian: Софийски университет „Св. Климент Охридски“) is a public research university in Sofia, Bulgaria. It is the oldest institution of higher education in Bulgaria.

Founded on 1 October 1888, the edifice of the university was constructed between 1924 and 1934 with the financial support of the brothers Evlogi Georgiev and Hristo Georgiev (whose sculptures are now featured on its façade) and has an area of 18,624 m^{2} and a total of 324 premises. The university has 16 faculties and three departments, where over 21,000 students receive their education. The current rector is Georgi Valchev.

== History ==
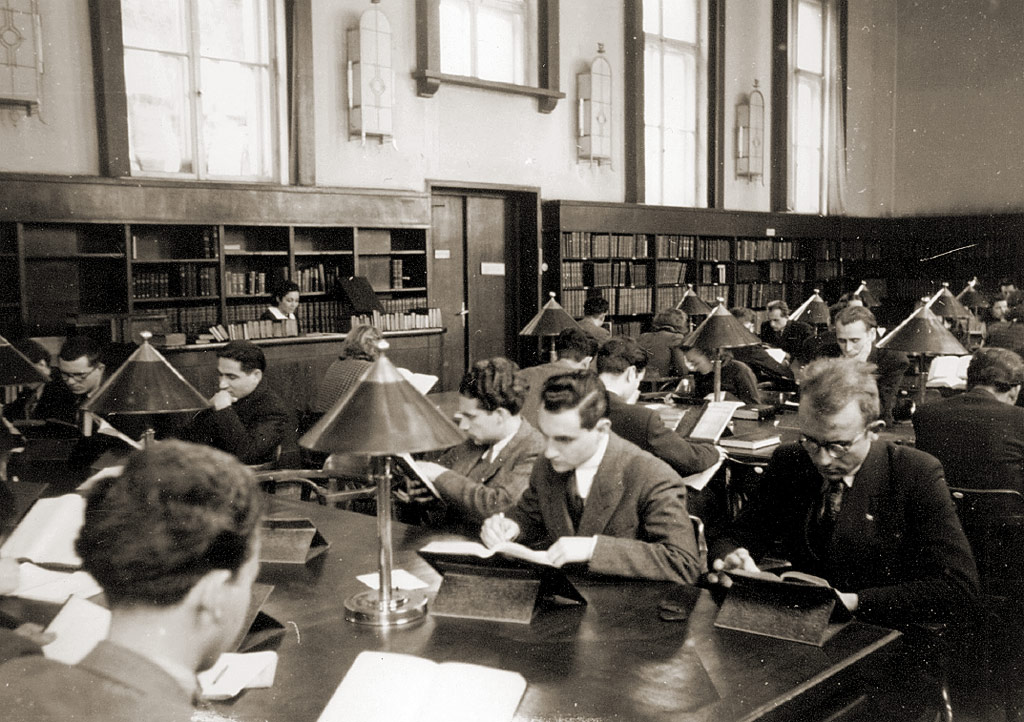
University students in the 1930s

The university was founded on 1 October 1888—ten years after the liberation of Bulgaria—to serve as Bulgaria's primary institution of higher education.

The university's first iteration was as a year-long "Higher Pedagogical Course" extending the curriculum of an already existing secondary school in Sofia. The course's founders "consciously built the foundations of an institution of higher learning" within their curriculum, drawing upon the subject matter of Austrian and German Universities from which four of them had received their doctorates. Subsisting of seven initial lecturers and forty-three students, the Higher Pedagogical Course aimed to educate elementary school teachers at the Gymnasium to fill national gaps among civil servants in "education and scholarship."

With aid from provisional statutes provided by founder Ivan Shishmanov in January 1889, the initial Higher Pedagogical Course was legally extended into a multi-departmental "Higher School" with three-year study tracks before the end of its first year. As the demand for educators was met, Sofia's Higher School and its staff continued to organize, expand, and refine their efforts across disciplines. And though it would take 15 years for its fully-actualized "vision" to come to fruition, according to historian Marin Pundeff (Bulgarian: Марин Пундев ), by the mid 1890's the Higher School was a respected national hub for scholarship with all "the functions and earmarks of a university." Shishmanov became Minister of Education in 1903, and by 1904 he passed a law through the National Assembly which expanded the Higher School's now four-year magistrate program into an officially instituted university. Sofia University's first rector was Bulgarian linguist Aleksandar Teodorov-Balan.

During its first years, Sofia University had three faculties, namely a Faculty of History and Philology (since 1888), a Faculty of Mathematics and Physics (since 1889) and a Faculty of Law (since 1892). History, geography, Slavic philology, philosophy and pedagogics, mathematics and physics, chemistry, natural sciences and law were also taught. The first women (16 in number) were welcomed to the university in 1901 and 25 November (8 December N.S.), the day of St. Kliment of Ohrid, became the university's official holiday the following year.

As Prince Ferdinand opened the National Theatre in 1907, he was booed by Sofia University students, for which the university was closed for six months and all lecturers were fired. Not until a new government with Aleksandar Malinov at the head came into power in January 1908 was the crisis resolved.

At the beginning of the Balkan Wars, 1,379 students (725 men and 654 women) were recorded to attend the university. A fourth faculty was established in 1917, the Faculty of Medicine, the fifth, the Faculty of Agronomy following in 1921, the Faculty of Veterinary Medicine and the Faculty of Theology being founded in 1923. In 1922–1923, Sofia University had 111 chairs, 205 lecturers and assistants and 2,388 students, of which 1,702 men and 686 women.

The foundation stone of Sofia University's new edifice was laid on 30 June 1924. Funds were secured by the brothers Evlogi Georgiev and Hristo Georgiev. The rectorate was built according to the initial plans of the French architect Henri Bréançon, who had won a competition for the purpose in 1907. The plans were developed by Nikola Lazarov and revised by Yordan Milanov, who also directed the construction, but died before the official opening on 16 December 1934.

On 27 October 1929, the first doctoral thesis in natural science of the university was defended by geologist Vassil Tzankov. The second one in chemistry followed on 1 July 1930 and the title doctor was granted to Aleksandar Spasov. In 1930–1931, the university had four more doctors.

After the political changes of 9 September 1944 and the emergence of the People's Republic of Bulgaria, radical alterations were made in the university system of the country. At that time in 1944–1945, 13,627 students attended the university, taught by 182 professors and readers and 286 assistants. Communist professors were introduced to the higher ranks of university authority, with others that did not share these views being removed. Specific party-related chairs were established and the university was restricted after the Soviet model. Three new faculties were founded in 1947, one of forestry, one of zootechnics and one of economics and major changes occurred, with many departments seceding in later years to form separate institutions.

In 2001, the Sofia University was the first Bulgarian Athenaeum to open a Theological Faculty ruled by the national Orthodox Church after the fall of communism.

Sofia University Mountains on Alexander Island, Antarctica were named for the university in commemoration of its centennial celebrated in 1988 and in appreciation of the university's contribution to the Antarctic exploration.

=== Astronomy Observatory ===
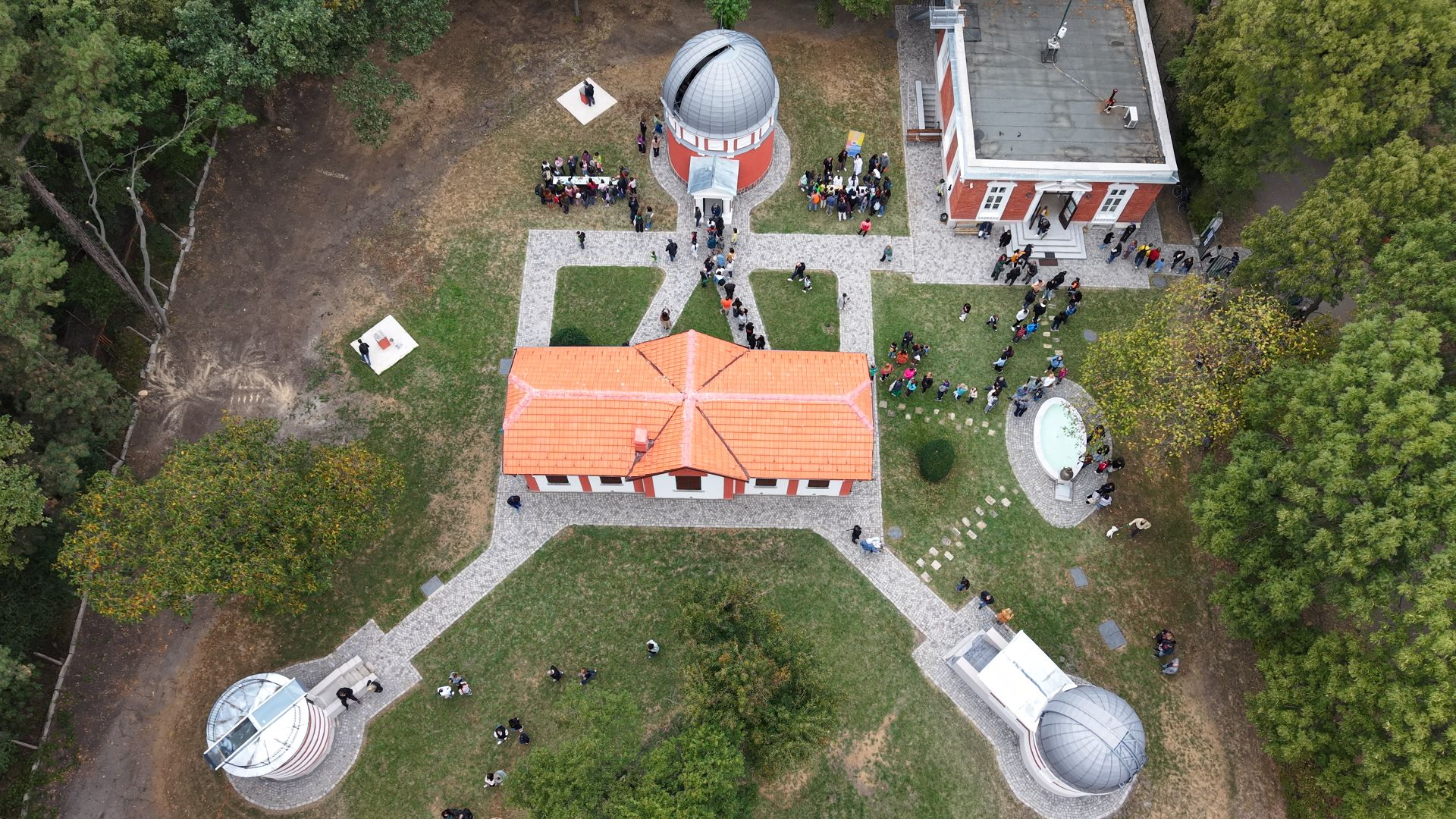
Astronomical Observatory of Sofia University

Astronomical Observatory of Sofia University "St. Kliment Ohridski" is the first astronomical observatory in Bulgaria and one of the first on the Balkan Peninsula. The Observatory is also the first building constructed for the needs of Sofia University. It was established in 1897 at the initiative of Prof. Marin Bachevarov. It is located in Borisova Gradina, near the "Maria Luisa" swimming pool. The primary purpose of the astronomical observatory is educational, serving the Department of Astronomy of the Faculty of Physics of Sofia University.

== Faculties and departments ==
=== Faculties ===
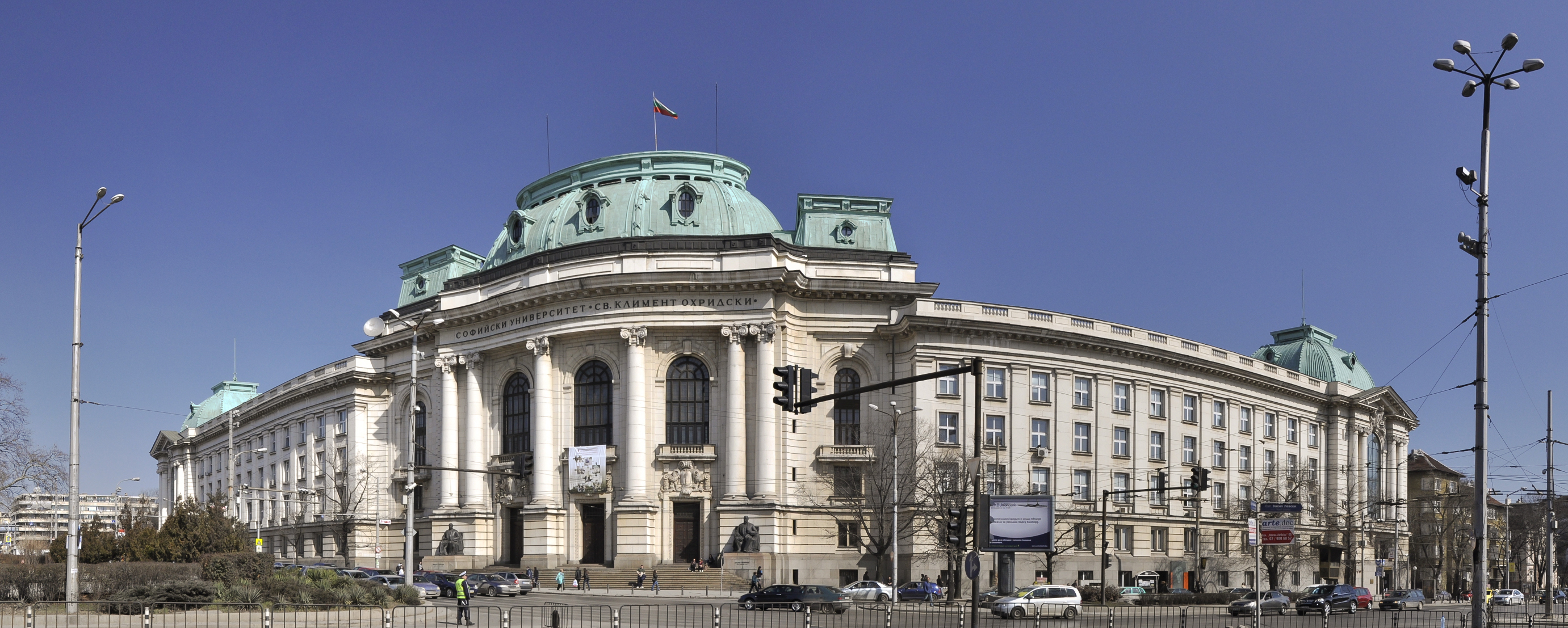
Sofia University's main building

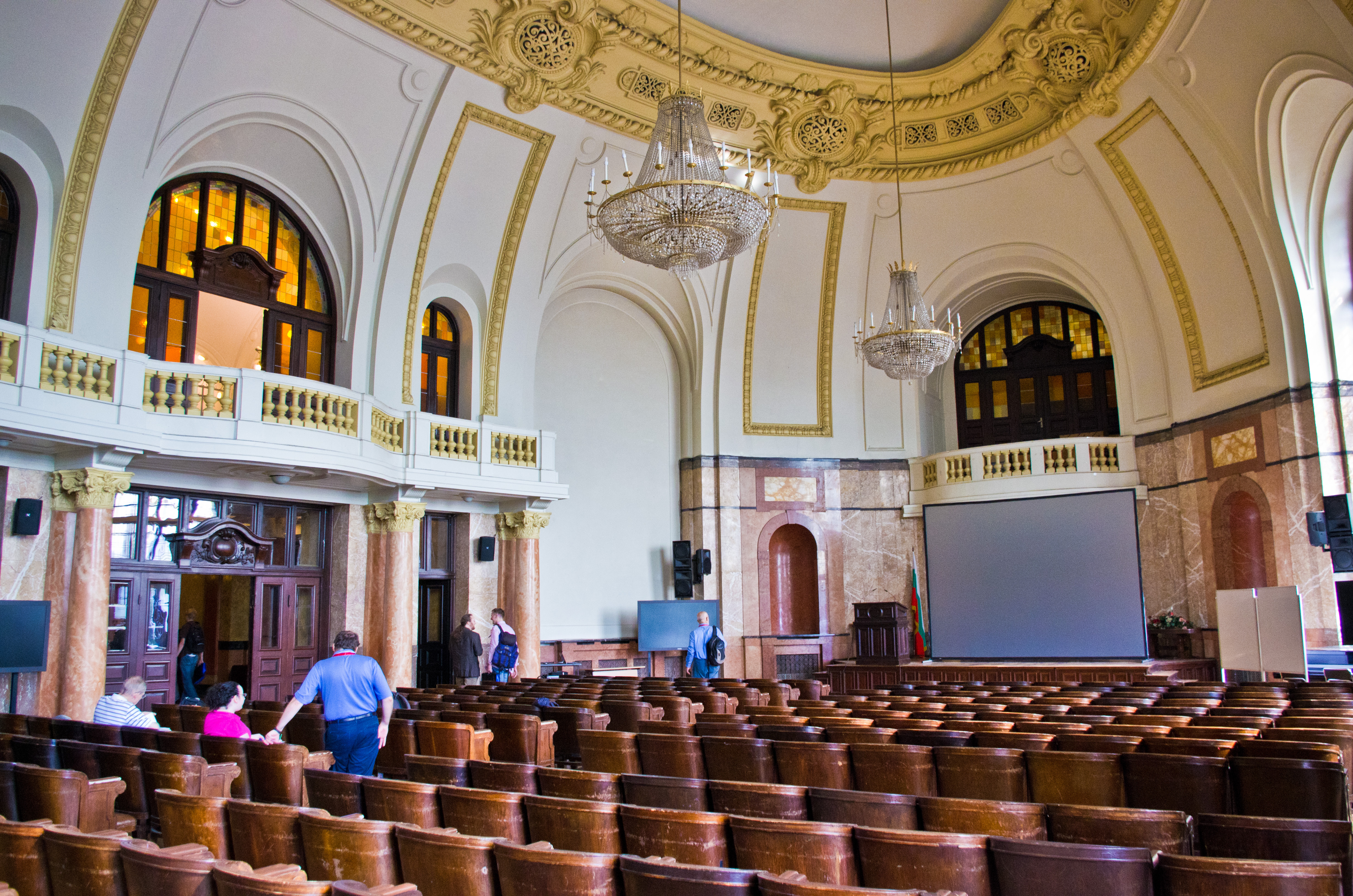
Aula of Sofia University in the Rectorate, the university main building

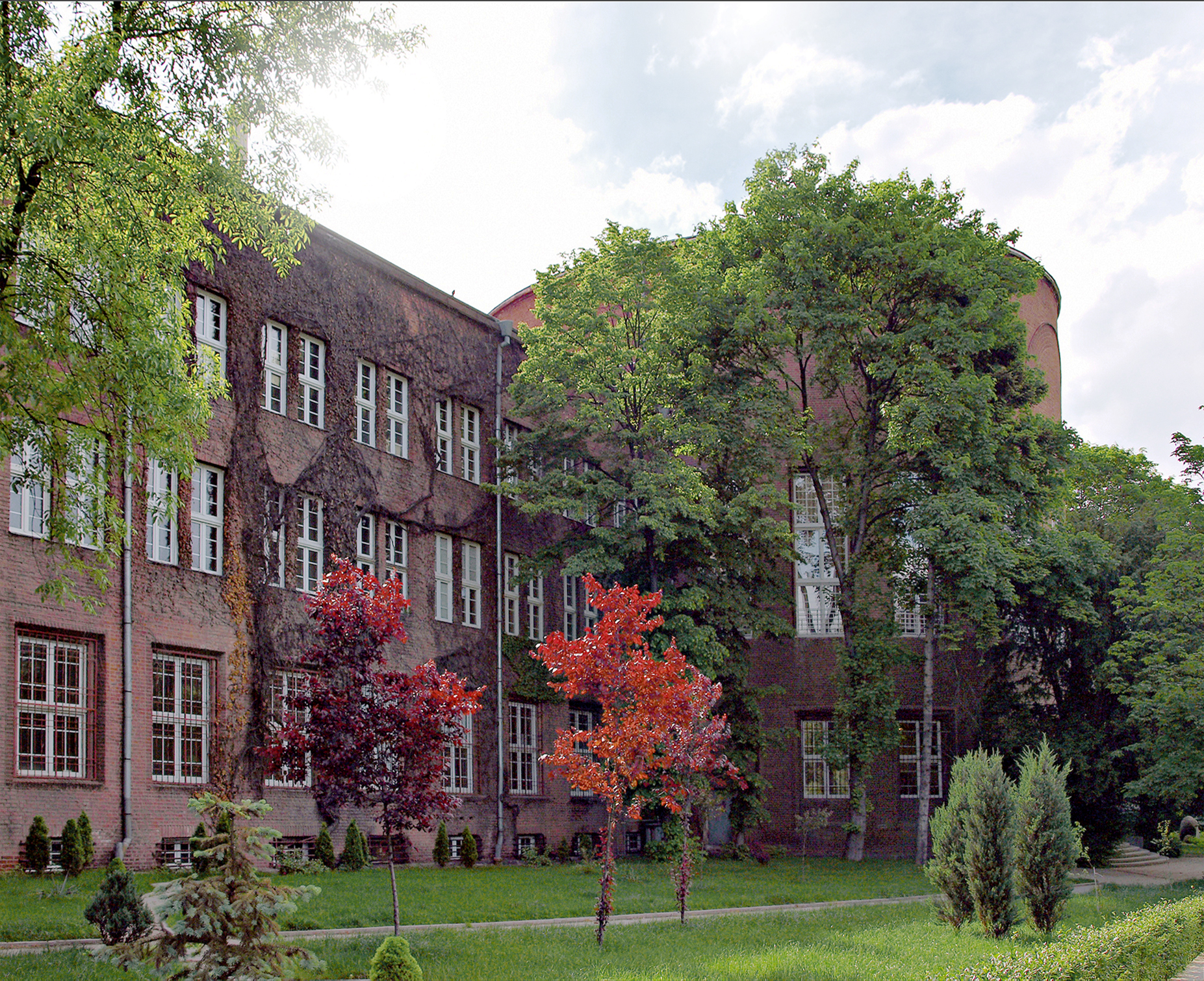
Faculty of Biology

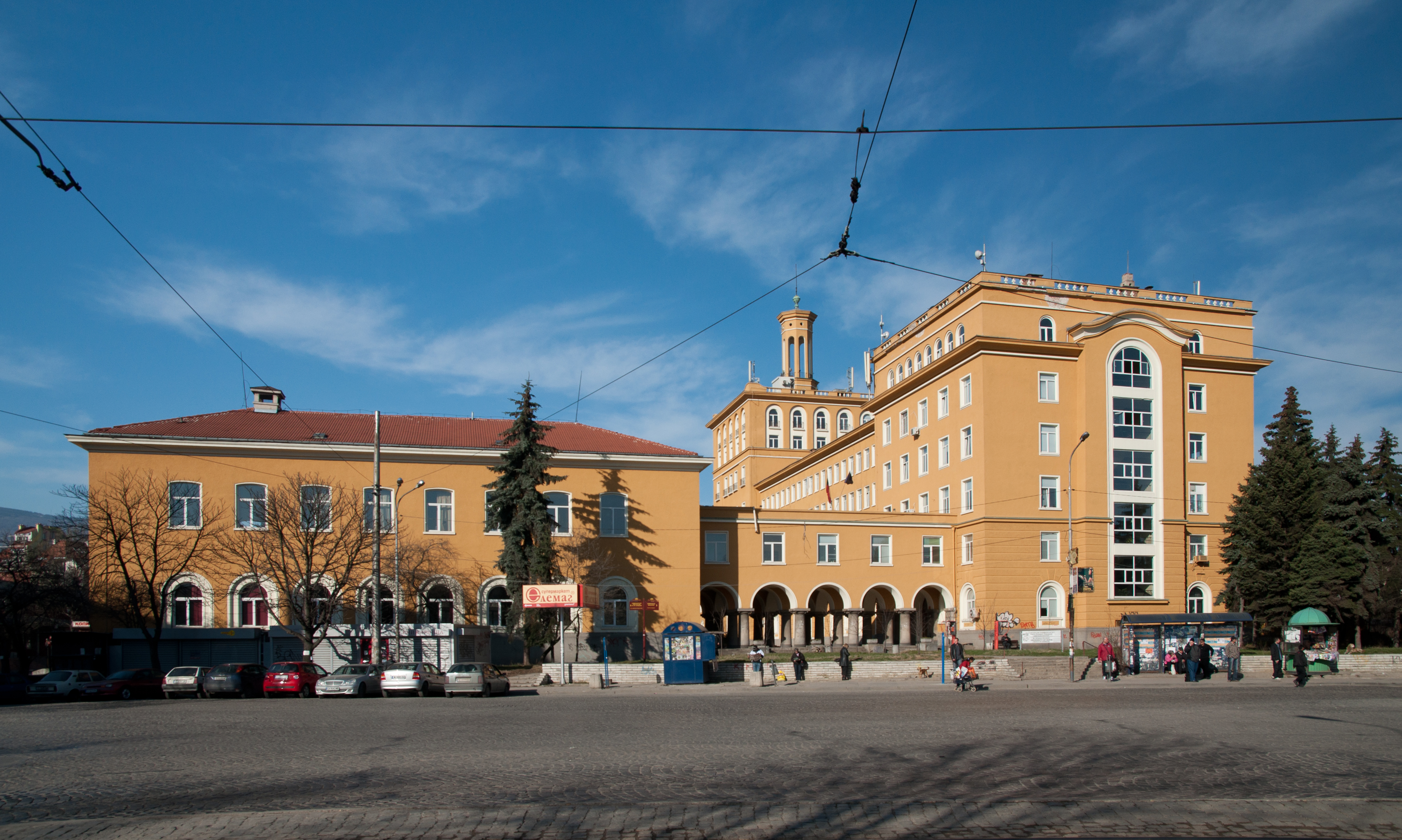
Faculty of Chemistry and Pharmacy

Sofia University offers a wide range of degrees in 16 faculties:

- Faculty of Biology
- Faculty of Chemistry and Pharmacy
- Faculty of Classical and Modern Philology
- Faculty of Economics and Business Administration
- Faculty of Education
- Faculty of Geology and Geography
- Faculty of History
- Faculty of Journalism and Mass Communication
- Faculty of Law
- Faculty of Mathematics and Informatics
- Faculty of Philosophy
- Faculty of Physics
- Faculty of Pre-school and Primary School Education
- Faculty of Slavic Studies
- Faculty of Theology
- Faculty of Medicine

== Departments ==
- Department of Language Learning
- Department for Information and In-service Training of Teachers
- Sports Department

=== Affiliated bodies ===
- Balkan Universities Network
- National Centre of Polar Research

== Notable alumni ==
- (Bulgaria) Elisaveta Bagryana, poet
- (United Kingdom) Anthony Bailey, businessman
- (Bulgaria) Pepka Boyadjieva, sociologist
- (Bulgaria) Kiril Bratanov, scientist
- Iván Cepeda, politician and senator of Colombia
- (Bulgaria) Ljubomir Chakaloff, mathematician
- (Bulgaria) / (Italy) Boris Christoff, opera singer
- (Belgium) Raymond Detrez, historian
- Philip Dimitrov, politician and lawyer, former Prime Minister of Bulgaria and member of the Constitutional Court of Bulgaria
- (Bulgaria) Todor Georgiev, scientist and inventor
- (Bulgaria) Khristo Ivanov, scientist
- (Bulgaria) Rostislaw Kaischew, scientist
- (Bulgaria) Mimoza Konteva, geographer
- Ivan Kostov, politician and economist, former Prime Minister of Bulgaria
- (Bulgaria) / (France) Julia Kristeva, philosopher and writer
- (Bulgaria) Maxim, cleric and head of the Bulgarian Orthodox Church
- (Bulgaria) Georgi Nadjakov, physicist
- (Bulgaria) Ivan Kostov Nikolov, geologist and mineralogist
- (Israel) Ya'akov Nitzani, politician, Knesset member
- Georgi Parvanov, former President of Bulgaria
- (Bulgaria) / (United States) Ivan Georgiev Petrov, physicist
- (Bulgaria) Assen Razcvetnikov, poet, writer and translator
- (Bulgaria) Dimitar Sasselov, astronomer
- (Bulgaria) Lachezara Stoeva, diplomat
- Petar Stoyanov, former president of Bulgaria
- (Bulgaria) / (Germany) Ivan Stranski, physical chemist
- (Bulgaria) / (France) Tzvetan Todorov, philosopher
- (Bulgaria) Orlin D. Velev, professor and scientist
- (Syria) Mikhail Wehbe, diplomat
- (Iraq) Rashid Yassin, journalist and poet
- Zhelyu Zhelev, former President of Bulgaria
- Maria Zheleva, filmmaker and former First Lady of Bulgaria
- (Bulgaria) Lyudmila Zhivkova, politician
- Iliana Iotova, current President of Bulgaria

== Partner Universities ==
=== Europe ===
Humboldt-Universität Berlin, Technische Universität Dresden, Université de Genève, Université libre de Bruxelles and others.

== See also ==
- List of modern universities in Europe (1801–1945)
- Trifon Trifonov (astronomer)
