= Economedia =

Bulgarian Publisher of Business Media

Economedia is the largest publisher of business media in Bulgaria. It is mainly known for publishing the weekly Capital and the daily Dnevnik, both business-oriented. The majority owner of Economedia is Ivo Prokopiev.

It is owned by Ivo Prokopiev (51%) and Teodor Zakhov (49%). Teodor Zakhov took the shares of Filip Harmandzhiev in 2010.
