= SOFIX =

Bulgarian stock market index

- Foundation: October 20, 2000; 26 years ago
- Base level: 100
- Operator: Bulgarian Stock Exchange
- Constituents: 15
- Weighting method: Price-weighted
- ISIN: BG92SOFI4086
- Reuters: .SOFIX
- Bloomberg: SOFIX

SOFIX is the first official stock market index of the Bulgarian Stock Exchange. The index represents the correlation between the total market capitalization of member companies on the current day and the previous day.

== History ==
SOFIX was introduced on October 20, 2000 with an initial value of 100 BGN and reached its historical peak of 1981.80 BGN in October 2007.

== Index profile ==
| Name | SOFIX |
| Currency | EUR |
| Changes in index base | Semi-annual |
| Changes in free-float | quarterly |

== Composition ==
As of 24 February 2026, the index is composed of the following companies:

| BSE Ticker | Company | Sector |
|---|---|---|
| ATER | Advance Terrafund REIT | Real Estate |
| BREF | Bulgarian Real Estate Fund REIT | Real Estate |
| BSE | Bulgarian Stock Exchange | Financials |
| CCB | Central Cooperative Bank | Financials |
| CHIM | Chimimport | Diversified |
| DUH | Doverie United Holding | Diversified |
| EAC | Elana Agrocredit AD | Financials |
| EUBG | Eurohold Bulgaria | Financials |
| FIB | First Investment Bank | Financials |
| HVAR | Holding Varna | Real Estate |
| SFA | Sopharma | Pharmaceuticals |
| SGH | Sirma Group Holding | Information Technology |
| SLYG | Shelly Group | Industrials |
| SO | Smart Organic | Food and Beverage |
| WISR | Wiser Technology | Information Technology |

== Index Tracking ==
Passive exposure to the index for international investors is possible through an exchange-traded fund - Expat Bulgaria SOFIX UCITS ETF - traded in euro and listed in Frankfurt on Xetra (ticker: BGX, ISIN: BG9000011163) and on the London Stock Exchange. The fund acts as a conduit for capital flows between the international financial markets and the Bulgarian capital market.

A short (inverse) passive index ETF allowing inverse exposure also exists - Expat Bulgaria Short SOFIX - listed on the Bulgarian Stock Exchange only (ticker BGXS, ISIN BG9000002196).
