= Georgi Naydenov =

Georgi Naydenov may refer to:

- Georgi Naydenov (businessman), Bulgarian businessman and banker
- Georgi Naydenov (footballer, born 1931), Bulgarian football goalkeeper and manager
- Georgi Naydenov (footballer, born 1936), Bulgarian football goalkeeper
