= Stoyo Nedin =

Stoyo Nedin (Bulgarian: Стою Недин) (born December 6, 1959, in Sofia, Bulgaria) is the Chairman of the Bulgarian Investors Association, a member organization of the European Federation of Financial Services Users (Eurofinuse). He has been a member of the European Shareholders Group (Euroshareholders) since 2002. The members of this association, which merged with Eurofinuse in January 2013, work mainly with the BSE. Furthermore, they help to regulate the development of the stock exchange.

Nedin is also President of the Securities Holders Association, President of the Bulgarian Applied Psychology Association, and director of Vialis Ltd. Since 2005 he has been on the board of directors of the Bulgarian Navy and, later, on the board of directors of Swissport. He is one of the creators of the Bulgarian Code of Capital Investments. As a specialist in organizational development and corporate governance, he organizes the awards for Best Corporate Governance.
