= MKB Unionbank =

Unionbank Юнионбанк
- Company type: Commercial bank
- Industry: Financial services
- Founded: 1991
- Defunct: 2014
- Headquarters: Sofia, Bulgaria
- Key people: Maria Ilieva (CEO and Chairman of the Management Board), Imre Balogh (Chairman of the Supervisory Board)
- Products: Retail banking, Corporate banking, Loans
- Revenue: €77 million (2010)
- Net income: €4.3 million (2010)
- Total assets: €1.7 billion (end 2010)
- Total equity: €158 million (end 2010)
- Number of employees: 750 (FTE, end 2010)
- Parent: First Investment Bank
- Website: www.unionbank.bg

Unionbank (Bulgarian: Юнионбанк, Yunionbank) was a major Bulgarian retail and commercial bank with headquarters in Sofia.

As of the end of 2010, its assets amounted to over €1.7 billion and growing, while the share capital of the bank exceeded €158 million. Unionbank has 55 active branch locations around the country. As of January 2011, the bank has a long-term credit rating of BBB+ from the Fitch credit agency.

== History ==
MKB Unionbank was founded in January 1991 as Boras OOD, a limited liability company, licensed by the Bulgarian National Bank (BNB) to trade in foreign currencies. Boras OOD founded, as a subsidiary company, a financial brokerage house Sofia AD, licensed by BNB as a non-banking financial institution. Sofia AD was renamed and licensed as a commercial bank as Unionbank AD and received a full banking license in 1996.

In September 2002, the European Bank for Reconstruction and Development (EBRD) acquired 15% of Unionbank's capital.

In December 2005, MKB Bank acquired 60% of Unionbank's capital and renamed it to MKB Unionbank in May 2006.

In September 2009, MKB Bank increased its percentage in the share capital of MKB Unionbank with 34% to 94% by buying all shares of Boras OOD.

In July 2012 Fitch has confirmed MKB Unionbank's long-term credit rating at BBB+.

In August 2013 First Investment Bank buys MKB Unionbank.

== Key people ==
MKB Unionbank has a tiered board structure, which includes a Management Board and a Supervisory Board.

=== Management Board ===
- Maria Ilieva – CEO, Chairman of the Management Board

=== Supervisory Board ===
- Imre Balogh – Chairman of the Supervisory Board

== Subsidiaries ==
According to the MKB Unionbank website, MKB Unionbank has one wholly owned subsidiary - AMC Imoti, a real estate operation, property valuation, and investment development, and property management company.

== Key figures ==
- Client deposits: €860 million (end 2010)
- Client loans: €1.11 billion (end 2010)
- Branches: 55 (end 2010)

== See also ==
- List of banks in Bulgaria
