= Sarsod =

- Village
- Location in Haryana, India Sarsod (India)
- Coordinates: 29.320995°N 75.834512°E
- Country: India
- State: Haryana
- District: Hisar

Government
  - Body: Gram Panchayat, Sarsod
- Elevation: 214 m (702 ft)

Population (2011)
  - Total: 5,216
- Time zone: UTC+5:30 (IST)
- Postal code: 125 121
- Telephone code: 91-01693
- ISO 3166 code: IN-HR
- Vehicle registration: HR-80
- Nearest city: Hisar, Chandigarh
- Website: haryana.gov.in

Sarsod is a village located in the Barwala tehsil of Hisar district in Haryana, India. It is situated approximately 30 km northeast of Hisar along National Highway 52 toward Chandigarh, and 9 km southwest of Barwala. The Rajiv Gandhi Thermal Power Station is located roughly 3 km from the village.

== History ==
=== Folklore and origin ===
According to local folklore documented in ethnographic surveys by Horace Arthur Rose, several villages in Hisar derive their names from a tradition involving the slaying of a giant whose severed limbs were said to have fallen across the region. Under this tradition, the name of Sarsod (recorded historically as Sarsud) corresponds to where the giant's head (Hindi: सर, sar) fell.

== Demographics ==
According to the 2011 Census of India, Sarsod has 961 households with a total population of 5,216, comprising 2,770 males and 2,446 females. Children aged 0–6 number 616, accounting for 11.8% of the total population.

Members of the Scheduled Castes constitute 1,234 (23.6%) of the population, while there are no recorded Scheduled Tribes in the village.

The village recorded 3,051 literate individuals (1,847 males and 1,204 females), yielding an effective literacy rate (excluding children aged 0–6) of 66.3% (76.4% for males and 55.2% for females). Economically, 2,190 persons (1,492 males and 698 females) were engaged in work activities, while 3,026 were classified as non-workers.

== Administration and divisions ==
Administratively governed by its Gram Panchayat, the village is traditionally demarcated into historical residential and revenue sectors (*panas*). According to official electoral rolls published by the Election Commission of India, these divisions include:

- Pana Bhagmal (पाना भागमल)
- Pana Garhmal (पाना गारहमल)
- Pana Khaiman (पाना खैमान)
- Chauthaidar Pana (चौथाईदार पाना)
- Valmiki Mohalla (बाल्मिकी मोहल्ला)

Sarsod is represented in the Haryana Legislative Assembly under the Barwala assembly constituency (AC-51) and falls under the Hisar parliamentary constituency (PC-4) for general elections to the Lok Sabha.

== Education ==
Sarsod has both public and private educational institutions. Government schools in the village include:

- Government Senior Secondary School (GSSS Sarsod-Bichpari)
- Government Girls High School (GGHS Sarsod)
- Government Primary School (GPS Sarsod)

Private educational institutions serving the village include Sunrise Modern School and Jat High School.

== Economy and infrastructure ==
Banking services in Sarsod are provided by both commercial and cooperative banking institutions:

- Punjab National Bank operates a commercial bank branch in the village, serving Sarsod and neighbouring areas.
- The Hisar Central Co-operative Bank (DCCB Hisar) maintains a branch in the village, as well as an affiliated Primary Agricultural Credit Society (PACS).
