= List of banks in Bulgaria =

Econ

Head office of United Bulgarian Bank at Millennium Center, Sofia on 89B, Vitosha Blvd

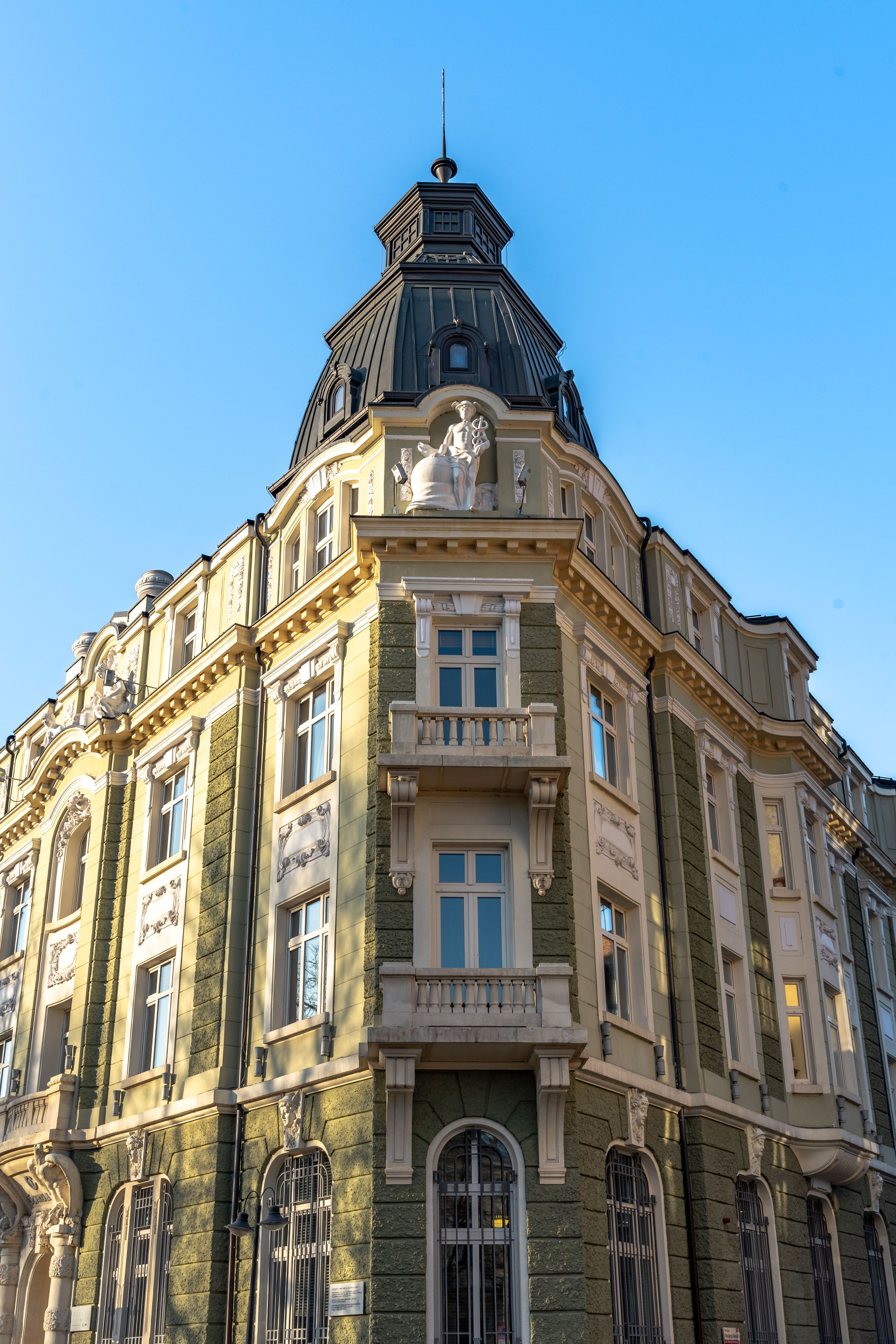
Historic part of the head office of DSK Bank in Sofia on 19, Moskovska Street

Head office of UniCredit Bulbank in Sofia on 7, St. Nedelya Square

The following list of banks in Bulgaria is to be understood within the framework of the European single market and European banking union, which means that Bulgaria's banking system is more open to cross-border banking operations than peers outside of the EU.

== Policy framework ==
European banking supervision, which Bulgaria joined in 2020 in anticipation of its euro adoption in early 2026, distinguishes between significant institutions (SIs) and less significant institutions (LSIs), with SI/LSI designations updated regularly by the European Central Bank (ECB). Significant institutions are directly supervised by the ECB using joint supervisory teams that involve the national competent authorities (NCAs) of individual participating countries. Less significant institutions are supervised by the relevant NCA on a day-to-day basis, under the supervisory oversight of the ECB. In Bulgaria's case, the NCA is the Bulgarian National Bank.

== Significant institutions ==
As of 1 September 2025, the ECB had one Bulgarian bank in its list of significant institutions:

- DSK Bank AD, subsidiary of OTP Group

Of the four largest banks in Bulgaria, the other three are subsidiaries of euro-area banking groups (see detailed list below):

- United Bulgarian Bank, subsidiary of KBC Group
- UniCredit Bulbank, subsidiary of UniCredit
- Postbank, subsidiary of Eurobank Ergasias

== Less significant institutions ==
As of 1 September 2025, the ECB's list of supervised institutions included 17 Bulgarian LSIs.

=== High-impact LSIs ===
Of these, three were designated by the ECB as "high-impact" on the basis of several criteria including size:

- Bulgarian Development Bank, a public bank
- First Investment Bank AD
- Invest Capital AD, holding entity of Central Cooperative Bank (see below)

=== Other LSIs ===
The 14 other Bulgarian LSIs were as follows:

- Allianz Bulgaria Holding AD, subsidiary of Allianz
  - Allianz Bank Bulgaria AD, owned by Allianz Bulgaria Holding
- Bulgarian-American Credit Bank AD (BACB)
  - Tokuda Bank AD, acquired by BACB from Tokushukai Group
- Central Cooperative Bank AD, controlled by Invest Capital
- D Commerce Bank AD
- International Asset Bank AD
- Festa Holding AD, holding entity of Investbank
  - Investbank AD
- Municipal Bank AD, owned by Liechtenstein-based Novito Opportunities Fund AGmvK
- ProCredit Bank (Bulgaria) EAD, a subsidiary of ProCredit Holding
- TBI Bank EAD, a subsidiary of Advent International
- Texim Bank AD

== Third-country branches ==
As of 13 October 2025, one banking group established outside the European Economic Area had a branch in Bulgaria:

- (Turkey) Ziraat Bank

== Detailed information ==
Аll amounts are in EUR thousand.

Rank (2026)	Name	SWIFT (BIC)	Assets Jun 2025	Assets Sep 2025	Assets Dec 2025	Assets Mar 2026	Assets Jun 2026	Shareholders - over 10% (Jun 2026)
1.	DSK Bank	STSABGSF	19 346 212	20 155 395	21 980 343	23 492 940	23 991 712	OTP Bank RT, Hungary – 99.92%
2.	United Bulgarian Bank	UBBSBGSF	20 519 594	21 395 736	22 753 197	23 125 560	23 509 005	KBC BANK N.V., Kingdom of Belgium – 99.96%
3.	UniCredit Bulbank	UNCRBGSF	18 993 170	19 792 015	20 971 200	20 624 634	20 696 482	UNICREDIT S.P.A., Republic of Italy – 99.45%
4.	Eurobank Bulgaria (Postbank)	BPBIBGSF	12 440 646	12 736 309	13 786 241	13 973 390	14 601 451	Eurobank S.A., Greece – 99.99%
5.	First Investment Bank (Fibank)	FINVBGSF	8 095 021	8 415 791	9 077 386	10 021 342	9 671 185	Ivaylo Dimitrov Mutafchiev, Republic of Bulgaria – 28.46% Tzeko Todorov Minev, Republic of Bulgaria – 28.46% Bulgarian Development Bank, Republic of Bulgaria - 18.35%
6.	Central Cooperative Bank	CECBBGSF	4 817 541	5 062 836	5 275 330	5 456 641	5 569 137	CCB Group EAD, Republic of Bulgaria – 61.05%
7.	Bulgarian Development Bank	NASBBGSF	1 620 762	1 644 429	3 513 732	3 408 529	3 373 168	Ministry of Economy, Investments and Industry, Republic of Bulgaria – 100%
8.	ProCredit Bank, Bulgaria	PRCBBGSF	2 467 144	2 554 936	2 656 516	2 680 093	2 691 024	ProCredit Holding AG, Federal Republic of Germany – 100%
9.	Allianz Bank Bulgaria	BUINBGSF	2 301 966	2 417 709	2 501 633	2 530 008	2 552 238	Allianz Bulgaria Holding JSC, Republic of Bulgaria – 99.9%
10.	TBI Bank	TBIBBGSF	1 940 247	2 062 793	2 195 037	2 286 946	2 317 127	BAGO (LUXEMBOURG) S.A.R.L., Grand Duchy of Luxembourg – 100%
11.	Investbank	IORTBGSF	1 934 756	1 945 738	2 016 341	1 980 361	2 005 458	Festa Holding JSC, Republic of Bulgaria – 83.8% Petya Ivanova Barakova-Slavova, Republic of Bulgaria – 10.68%
12.	International Asset Bank	IABGBGSF	1 568 332	1 754 253	1 642 132	1 844 048	1 870 040	Dynatrade International Ltd, Republic of Bulgaria – 33%
13.	Municipal Bank PLC	SOMBBGSF	1 427 727	1 397 101	1 592 235	1 637 954	1 614 762	NOVITO OPPORTUNITIES FUND AGMVK, Principality of Liechtenstein – 96.51%
14.	Bulgarian-American Credit Bank	BGUSBGSF	1 451 124	1 427 501	1 459 442	1 700 534	1 553 252	CSIF JSC, Republic of Bulgaria – 45.67% LTBI HOLDINGS LLC, USA – 33.45%
15.	D Commerce Bank	DEMIBGSF	1 121 162	1 179 889	1 090 104	1 227 035	1 205 085	Fuat Güven (Fuat Hyusniev Osmanov), Republic of Bulgaria – 55.52% FORTERA EAD, Republic of Bulgaria – 44.48%
16.	Citibank Europe, Bulgaria Branch	CITIBGSF	1 136 935	1 101 916	1 066 825	989 083	1 110 334	Citibank Europe Plc., Republic of Ireland – 100%
17.	ING Bank N.V., Sofia Branch	INGBBGSF	678 907	861 370	788 698	959 704	1 018 216	ING Bank N.V., Kingdom of the Netherlands – 100%
18.	Texim Bank	TEXIBGSF	380 482	413 309	487 102	486 208	483 379	Web Finance Holding AD, Republic of Bulgaria – 16.64%
19.	BNP Paribas S.A. – Sofia Branch	BNPABGSX	323 966	399 924	508 472	356 113	403 510	BNP Paribas S.A., Republic of France – 100%
20.	T.C. Ziraat Bank, Sofia Branch	TCZBBGSF	274 242	296 514	316 255	318 307	356 655	T.C. Ziraat Bankasi A.Ş., Ankara, Republic of Turkey – 100%
21.	Tokuda Bank	CREXBGSF	261 612	257 106	260 499	257 526	257 184	Bulgarian-American Credit Bank AD, Republic of Bulgaria – 100%
22.	Ascory Bank AG, Sofia Branch	VGAGBGSF	95 948	98 801	100 304	102 712	97 905	Ascory Bank AG, Federal Republic of Germany – 100%
23.	Bigbank AS, Bulgaria Branch	BIGKBGSF	34 059	38 406	45 226	56 161	69 764	Bigbank AS, Estonia – 100%

== Defunct banks ==
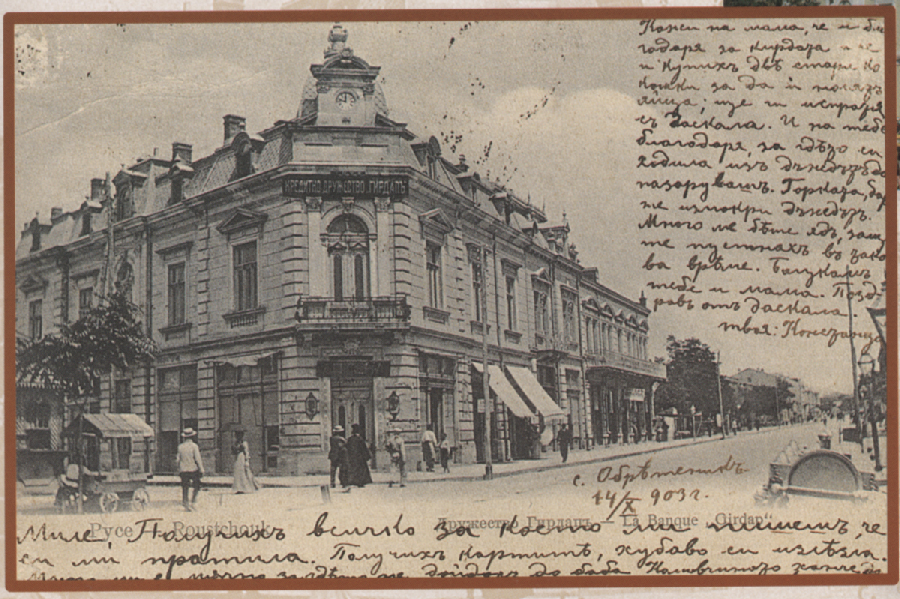
Girdap head office in Ruse, early 20th-century postcard

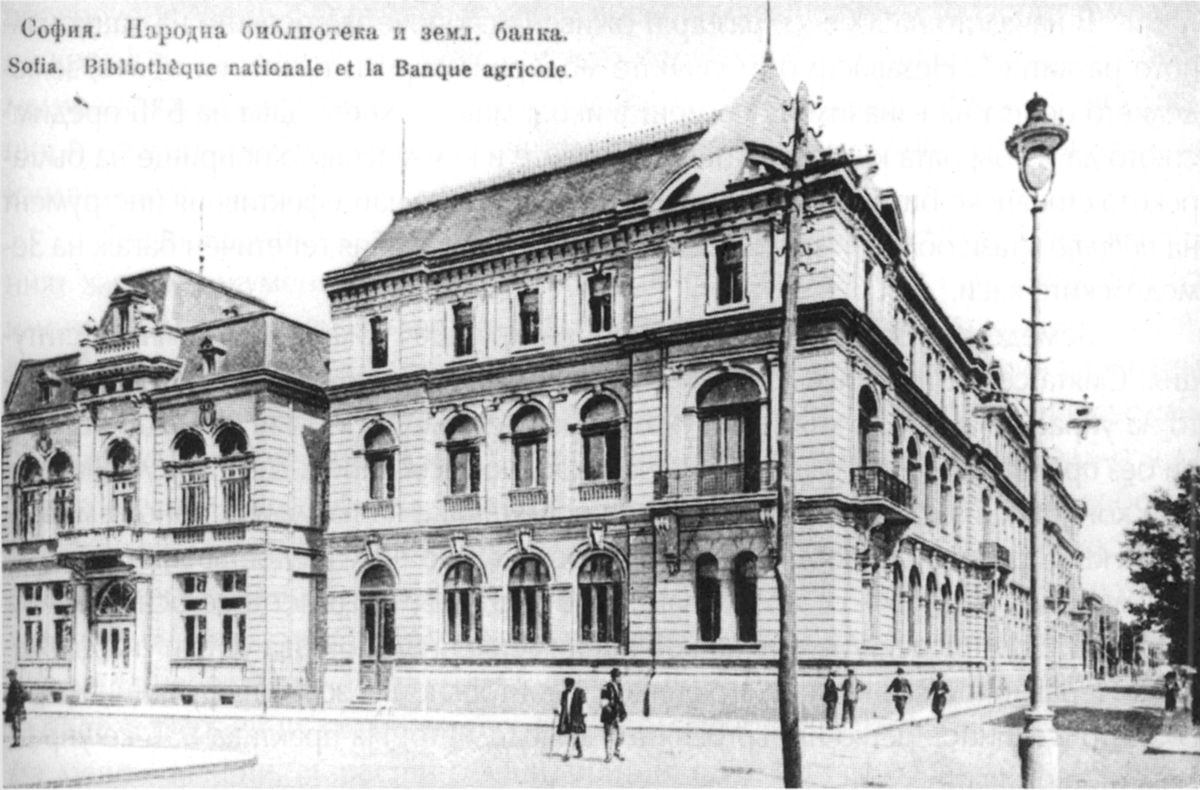
Bulgarian Agricultural Bank in Sofia, 1910 postcard

The first modern credit institution in what is now Bulgaria was the Plovdiv branch of the Imperial Ottoman Bank, in activity from 1878 to 1899. A number of former Bulgarian banks, defined as having been headquartered in present-day Bulgarian territory, are documented on Wikipedia. They are listed below in chronological order of establishment.

- Girdap (1881-1925)
- Bulgarian Commercial Bank (1895-1947)
- Bulgarian Postal Savings Bank (1895-1951)
- Bulgarian Popular Banks (1903-1952)
- Bulgarian Agricultural Bank (1904-1934)
- Bulgarian Central Cooperative Bank (1910-1934)
- Macedonian Cooperative Bank (1925-1947)
- Commercial Credit Bank (1929-1947)
- Macedonian National Bank (1929-1947)
- Bulgarian Agricultural and Cooperative Bank (1934-1947)
- Bulgarian Credit Bank (1934-1948)
- Bulgarian Investment Bank (1947-1967)
- Bulgarian Agricultural and Commercial Bank (1969-1971)
- Bulgarian Industrial Bank (1969-1971)
- Unionbank (1991-2014)
- Expressbank (1993-2020)
- Piraeus Bank Bulgaria (1993-2019)
- Corporate Commercial Bank (1994-2014)
- Raiffeisenbank Bulgaria (1994-2022)

== See also ==
- List of banks in the euro area
- List of banks in Europe
