= Bancpost =

- Company type: Private
- Industry: Finance and Insurance
- Founded: 1991
- Defunct: 3 January 2019
- Headquarters: Bucharest, Romania
- Products: Financial services
- Website: www.bancpost.ro

Bancpost was a Romanian bank based in Bucharest and a former member of Eurobank Ergasias Group. It official merged with Banca Transilvania on January 3, 2019.

== See also ==
- Eurobank Ergasias
- Bulgarian Postbank
- Eurobank a.d.
- List of banks in Romania
