= Chimimport AD =

Bulgarian holding company

Chimimport logo

Chimimport AD is a Bulgarian holding company listed on the Bulgarian Stock Exchange – Sofia since 2007 It also participates in the main Bulgarian index SOFIX.
