= Bulgarian Development Bank =

- Company type: Development Bank
- Industry: Financial services
- Founded: 1999
- Headquarters: Sofia, Bulgaria
- Key people: Assen Yagodin (CEO and Chairman of the Management Board), Dorothea Pandova (Chairman of the Supervisory Board)
- Products: Development finance, Corporate banking, Investment banking, Asset management, Loans
- Total assets: €825.26 mln (2015)
- Total equity: €461.33 mln (2015)
- Subsidiaries: National Guarantee Fund, JOBS Microfinance
- Website: www.bbr.bg

Bulgarian Development Bank (Bulgarian: Българска банка за развитие, Balgarska banka za razvitie) (BDB) is a leading Bulgarian development and commercial bank with headquarters in Sofia. It is one of the largest development institutions in Southeast Europe that provides financing and professional advising for the purposes of development. It is the largest Bulgarian financing facility provider to banks operating in the country, the sole national loan guarantee provider, and the only microfinance provider. Further to that, its direct lending commercial business division ranks as the 14th commercial bank in terms of assets in Bulgaria, with 850 million euro in assets as of June 2011.

BDB is majority owned by the Republic of Bulgaria, and has a public-interest mandate to finance projects of regional and national importance, to encourage the growth of export oriented companies, to assist small and medium enterprises to compete internationally, and to promote sustainable development. The bank's activities are financed with credit lines from multilateral development banks, investment funds, and sovereign wealth funds.

BDB has extensive industry coverage capacity in Bulgaria with a team of specialised industry sector consultants, each of whom partners with the sector's corresponding national industry organisations. As of November 2011, the bank has a long-term credit rating of "BBB−" with a positive outlook, short-term rating of "F3", individual rating "D", and support rating "2" from the Fitch Credit Rating Agency.

== Purpose ==
BDB was established on 11 March 1999 as a joint stock company intending to promoting economic and social development in Bulgaria. In April 2008, the Bulgarian Parliament adopted a special law, which changed the mandate of the bank and reorganised the bank group in its current form. BDB receives its funding from the European Investment Bank, the Black Sea Trade and Development Bank, the Qatar Investment Authority, the Council of Europe Development Bank, KfW, the China Development Bank, the Japan Bank for International Cooperation, the Nordic Investment Bank, and others.

=== Bank Financing Facility ===
In 2012, BDB launched a 100 million euro financing facility in Bulgaria to improve SME competitiveness and stimulate lending to SMEs. Loans under the BDB Bank Financing Facility are provided through credit lines extended to commercial banks taking part in the program.

=== Industry Partners Program ===
BDB's major push to expand in Bulgaria began in August 2012, when the bank partnered with more than 30 major nationwide industry associations to provide financial advisory and lending services to the organisations’ members. Under the Partners Initiative, BDB industry sector consultants were appointed to handle financial and loan questions from the organisations' member firms and national coverage was ensured by the establishment of a mobile team. BDB plans to extend 75 million euro in new loans for SME via the new program by the end of 2012.

=== Local Representatives Program ===
Under the Local Representatives Program, the bank has reached agreements with business centres in all six planning regions of Bulgaria and in 29 larger cities. The business centres serve as de facto BDB information and service centres.

== Governance ==
The shareholder structure of the Bulgarian Development Bank as of 31 December 2011 is as follows:

- Republic of Bulgaria – 99.9999%
- DSK Bank - 0.0001%

== Key people ==
BDB has a tiered board structure with a Management Board and a Supervisory Board. Key people in the organisation include:

- Dimo Spassov – CEO, Chairman of the Management Board
- Denitsa Kirova – Chairman of the Supervisory Board

== Subsidiaries ==
According to the BDB website, as of 2012, the bank ran the following subsidiaries as part of the BDB Group:

=== National Guarantee Fund ===
National Guarantee Fund EAD is a loan guarantee scheme, implemented through commercial banks operating on the Bulgarian market.

=== JOBS Microfinance ===
JOBS Microfinance Institution AD is a microfinance company, one of the largest in the country.

== See also ==
- List of banks in Bulgaria
- List of banks in the euro area
- List of national development banks
