= Bulgarian Agricultural and Commercial Bank =

Bulgarian Agricultural and Commercial Bank (Bulgarian: Българска земеделска и търговска банка) (BZTB) was a state bank in Bulgaria. It was created in 1969, together with the Bulgarian Industrial Bank. Both banks separated from the Bulgarian National Bank (BNB), which retained the main functions of a central bank, but the banks rejoined the national bank in 1971.

== See also ==
- List of banks in Bulgaria
