= Girdap =

Privately owned Bulgarian bank

Coordinates: 43°51′0.26″N 25°57′14.63″E

Girdap Гирдап
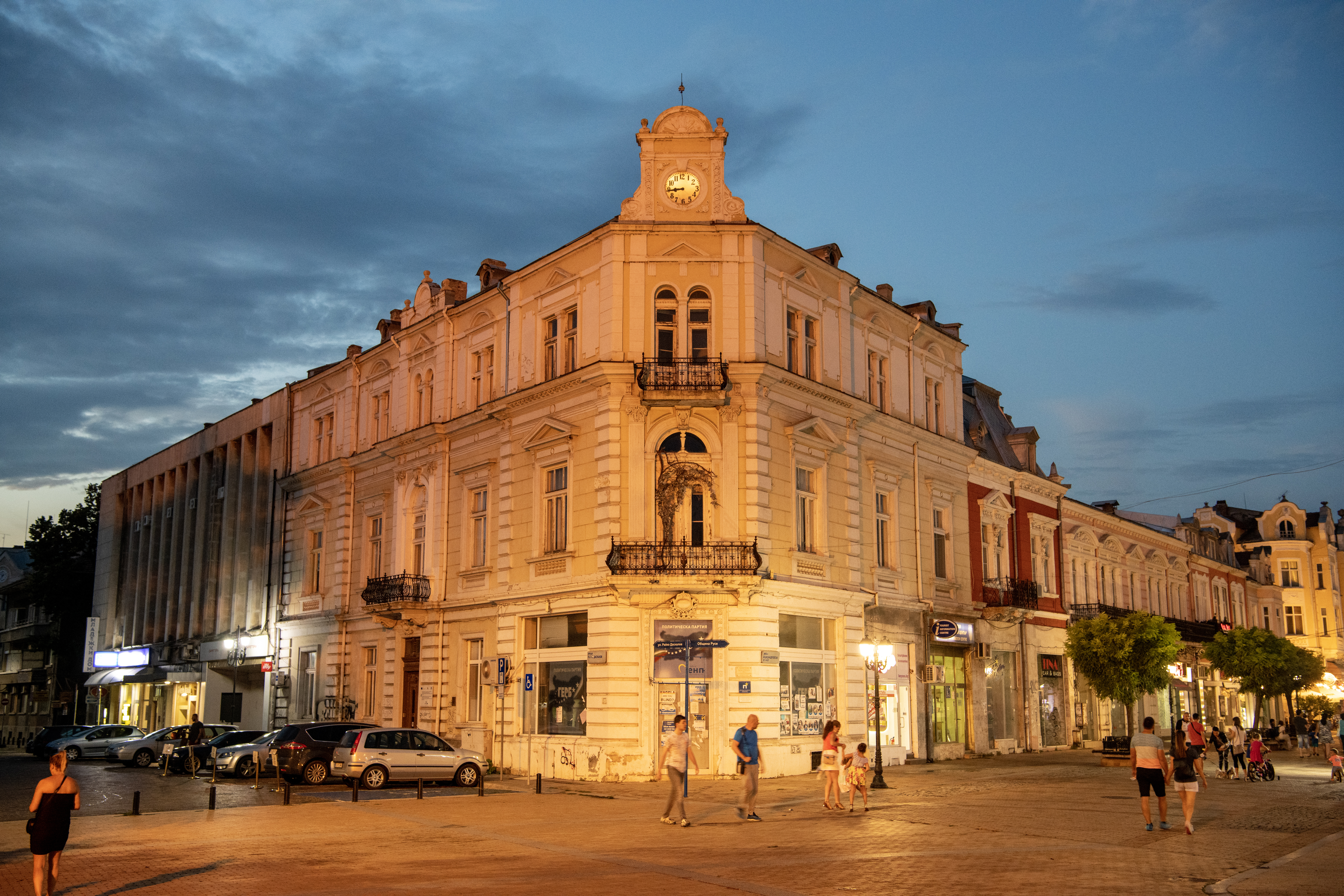
- Girdap's former central headquarters in Ruse
- Type: Joint-stock
- Industry: Financial services
- Founded: 1881
- Defunct: 1925
- Headquarters: Ruse, Bulgaria
- Key people: Boncho Bonev; Ivan Kovachev; Nikola Kovachev

Girdap or Ghirdap (Bulgarian: Гирдап) was the first privately owned Bulgarian bank. Established in Ruse in 1881, until its closure in 1925 it was one of the two large Bulgarian banks which relied on capital that was both private and local, along with the Bulgarian Commercial Bank. Prior to the Balkan Wars and World War I, Girdap was among the six largest banks in Bulgaria, and during the wars its financial group was the most influential in the country.

== History ==
=== Early years ===
Girdap's constituent assembly was held on 1 December 1881, less than four years after the Liberation of Bulgaria from Ottoman rule and the establishment of the Principality of Bulgaria. At the time, the northeastern Bulgarian city of Ruse was a major economic hub. Ruse prospered due to its role as a major port on the Danube, its rapid industrial development and its well-established ties with Central Europe along that river. Banking, however, was a new concept, as most people employed the services of money lenders and entrusted their savings to people they knew personally. The founders of Girdap sought to "liberate the population of money lenders", in the words of later bank director Boncho Boev. Due to an overall lack of capital in the country, interest rates of loans given by Girdap were nonetheless high: 15–18% as compared to the over 20–30% interest rate of money lenders. The bank officially commenced operations on 1 January 1882. It took its name from the Girdap neighbourhood of Ruse where the constituent assembly was held.

The capital of Girdap at the time of its foundation amounted to 1,380 Bulgarian gold leva, though by the end of 1882 it had increased fivefold to 6,900 gold leva. In 1886, the capital of Girdap amounted to 70,300 leva; in that year, the bank hired a clerk for the first time. In the year of the company's 10th anniversary, 1891, it disposed of 300,000 leva, and in 1894 its capital had increased to 1,000,000 leva. Founded as a depositor's company, it was transformed into a joint-stock credit company in 1894. In 1898, Girdap's capital was 1,500,000 leva and a new company statute was approved, which extended the board of managers to 12 members. These included Ruse's wealthiest and most eminent people, most notably the chairman Stefan Simeonov. In the autumn of 1902, Girdap opened its first branch offices outside Ruse: in the port of Varna on the Black Sea coast, in the Dobrujan city of Dobrich and in Istanbul (Constantinople), the capital of the Ottoman Empire and largest city of the Balkans. In Istanbul, the bank was known under a French name, Société de Crédit Ghirdap, though the branch only existed for 18 months and was closed down due to political pressure. An office in Silistra was opened on 1 August 1910.

Ever since its establishment Girdap served political interests, and it was later tied to the Popular Liberal Party of Stefan Stambolov. On the other hand, the Bulgarian Commercial Bank (Balgarska targovska banka), which was also founded in Ruse in 1885, was close to the Popular Party. The two banks competed for lending municipal loans and regularly used their political ties in their competition. These relations were often damaging to the Bulgarian treasury, as politicians who were also bank shareholders or somehow related to Girdap awarded contracts based on their personal interest rather than that of the state. As the Bulgarian economy consolidated in the first decade of the 20th century and the emerging industry required increasing funds, local banks grew in importance. In 1911 Girdap had a capital of 2 million leva and by 1912 it was the third-largest private bank in the Kingdom of Bulgaria after the Bulgarian Commercial Bank and the Deutsche Bank-related Credit Bank (Kreditna banka). However, Bulgaria's privately owned banking sector remained comparatively small.

=== Heyday and bankruptcy ===
Girdap's heyday was during the Balkan Wars and World War I (1912–1918), when it became the leading financial group in the kingdom and remained close to the government. It controlled some 83.97 million leva of invested capital, which put it ahead of the General Credit Society, the Balkan Bank and the Bulgarian Commercial Bank financial group. During the wars, Bulgarian banks established filial companies or invested in new enterprises. Girdap was no exception to that trend.

One of Girdap's notable enterprises was the international transport company Transbalkania which had a capital of 100,000 leva. Of the company's 500 shares, 200 were owned by Girdap and another 170 were owned by three of the bank's managers or employees. Liquidated after World War I, Transbalkania was active as a carrier from Bulgaria to Edirne, Alexandroupoli, Thessaloniki and Niš and along the Danube. During the wars, Girdap was involved in tobacco trade and had warehouses in modern Dupnitsa, Blagoevgrad and Xanthi. This led to the establishment of another Girdap venture, the Bulgarian Macedonian Bank (Balgarska makedonska banka), on 21 May 1916. The Bulgarian Macedonian Bank was mostly active as a commercial bank, which is indicated by its capital of 46.95 million leva as opposed to only 13.31 million leva of deposits. Other banks more or less related to Girdap included the Sofia Bank (Sofiyska banka, established in 1906), the Bulgarian Forest Commercial Bank (Balgarska gorsko-targovska banka, established in 1917), and the Bulgarian Surety Bank (Balgarska garantsionna banka, established in 1912). The Pleven-based Lev cement factory was founded in 1917 with Girdap board of managers member Ivan Kovachev as chief shareholder. Ninety percent of the capital of the Kurilo mine in the Iskar Gorge was controlled by Girdap or its head figures Ivan Kovachev and Boncho Boev. Despite Girdap's active involvement in assistance to national industry, it failed to make a significant contribution and gradually minimised its participation due to insufficient profits.

After World War I, Girdap was deprived of its government protections, as it had no links to the new agrarian government of Aleksandar Stamboliyski. In 1919 Boncho Bonev was imprisoned in Berkovitsa for eight months before he was acquitted, Ivan Kovachev was put on trial, and the bank's funds were sealed. In 1922, the Bulgarian National Bank closed Girdap's account, causing 38 million leva of deposits in Girdap to be withdrawn by 1923 and its debtors (including members of Girdap's management) to protest their bills. While at the time the Bulgarian National Bank, Girdap's most important creditor, was opposed to Girdap's declaration of bankruptcy, it reversed its stance two years later. Girdap was declared bankrupt on 3 February 1925 and its managers Boncho Boev, Ivan Kovachev and Nikola Kovachev were arrested.

== Headquarters in Ruse ==
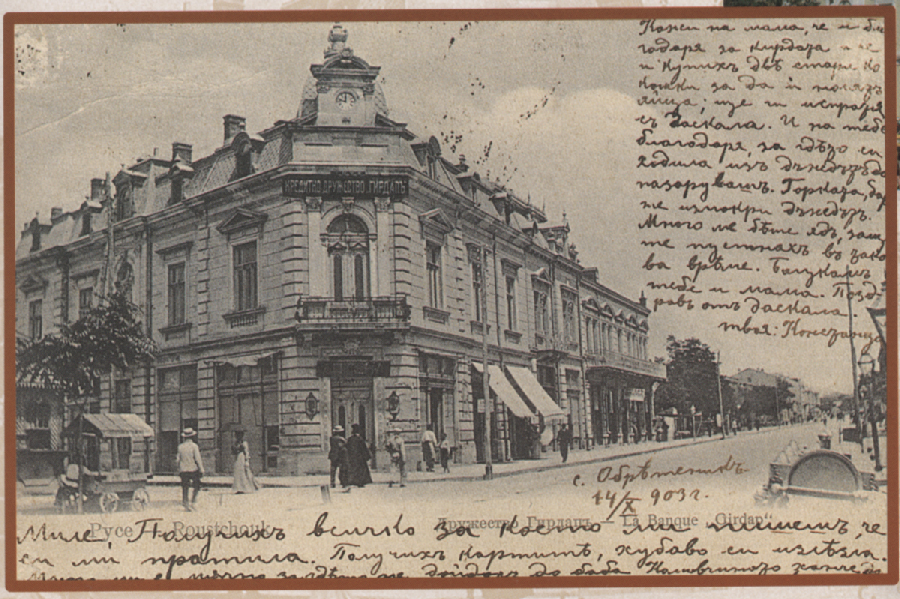
The Girdap headquarters before the attic burned down in 1913 and an additional floor was constructed

Girdap's central office in Ruse was located in a historic edifice at 2 Aleksandrovska Street that takes up 260 square metres (2,800 sq ft). It was finished in 1896 and designed either by Stoyan Zolotov and Udo Ribau (architect of what is known as Ruse's Old High School of Music) or by Samuil Danailov, at the time still an architecture student. Together with the opposing building owned by wine merchant Petar Petrov and built in 1897 under Viennese architect Georg Lang, the Girdap headquarters are part of an architectural ensemble highlighting the entrance to Ruse's commercial street from Liberty Square, the location of the Monument of Liberty.

The building's attic was damaged in a fire in 1913. An additional storey was constructed in 1935 under the engineer Todor Tonev, turning the headquarters into a three-storey edifice. The trademark clock was added in the late 19th century. In 1964–1967, the building's interior was refurbished so it could accommodate the City People's Council. Today, it houses the administration of Ruse's Chamber of Control.

== See also ==
- List of banks in Bulgaria

== Sources ==
- Аврамов, Румен (2007). Комуналният капитализъм (in Bulgarian). Vol. Т. II. София: Фондация Българска наука и култура, Център за либерални стратегии. ISBN 978-954-90758-8-5.
- Папазова, Магбуле (2009). "Банка "Гирдап" като център на българския финансов капитал" (PDF). Научни трудове на Русенския университет (in Bulgarian). 48. Русенски университет „Ангел Кънчев”.
- Сиври, Магбуле (2009). "Някои аспекти от развитието на банка "Гирдап" до войните" (PDF). Сборник доклади на студентска научна сесия — СНС'09 (in Bulgarian). Русе: Русенски университет „Ангел Кънчев”: 82–86. ISSN 1311-3321.
- Lampe, John R.; Marvin R. Jackson (1982). Balkan economic history, 1550–1950: from imperial borderlands to developing nations. Indiana University Press. ISBN 978-0-253-30368-4.
