= TBI Bank =

Bank in Bulgaria

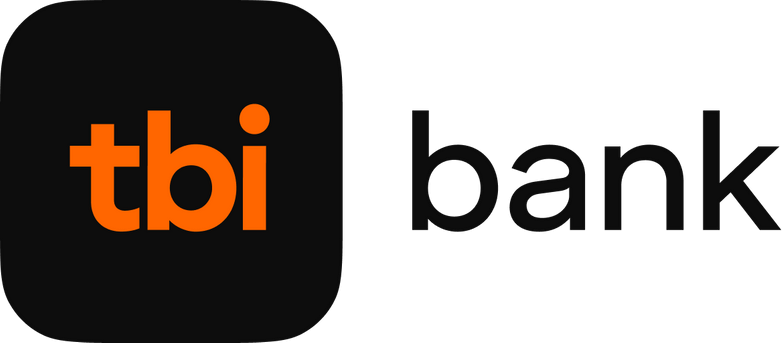
- Industry: Financial services
- Founded: 2002
- Founder: Ivaylo Georgiev
- Headquarters: 52–54 Dimitar Hadzhikotsev Street, Sofia, Bulgaria
- Key people: Petr Baron (CEO)
- Owner: Advent International
- Number of employees: 1,500 to 2,000
- Website: tbibank.com

TBI Bank, stylized as tbi bank, is a consumer- and SME-focused bank providing financial services in Bulgaria, Romania, and Greece, and (as a digital bank only) in Germany, Denmark, and Poland.

TBI has more than 2.4 million customers as of 2025 and operates through a partners’ network of close to 38,000 merchant stores.

== History ==
In 2002, TBIF Financial Services, a Kardan Group subsidiary, established TBI Credit in Bulgaria. It also set up additional companies, including TBI Invest, TBI Leasing, TBI Rent, and TBI Asset Management, creating one of the largest non-banking networks in the country at the time.

In 2011, TBIF acquired the Bulgarian branch of Nova Ljubljanska Banka (Slovenia) and entered the banking sector. This led to the consolidation of the businesses and the birth of TBI Bank.

In recent years, the bank has been consistently ranked as one of the most effective in Bulgaria. In 2025, Capital ranked TBI number one in efficiency and profitability.

In April 2025, Advent International announced the acquisition of TBI Bank, which was approved by the European Commission in August 2025 and by the European Central Bank in February 2026.

== See also ==
- List of banks in Bulgaria
