= DSK Bank =

Bulgarian banking institution

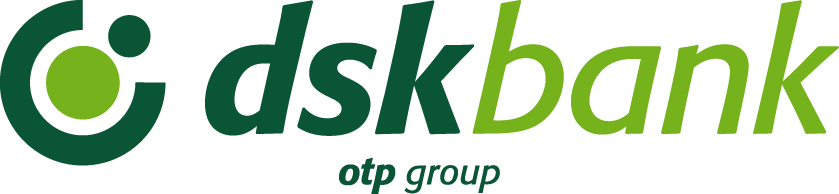

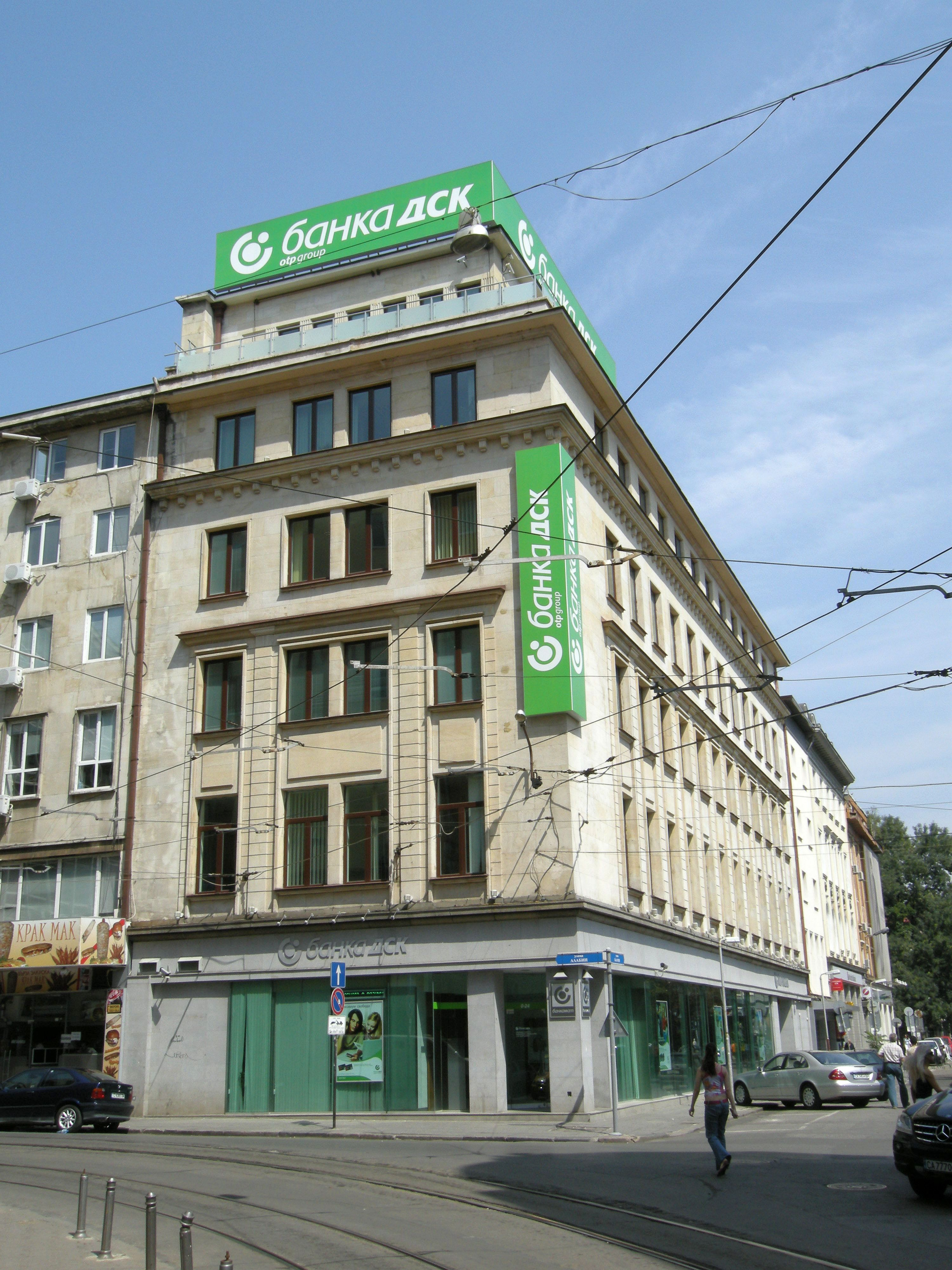
- Main office
- Founded: 1951
- Headquarters: Sofia, Bulgaria
- Key people: Tamás Hack-Kovács (CEO)
- Total assets: €14,74 mln (2022)
- Total equity: €1,89 mln (2022)
- Website: www.dskbank.bg

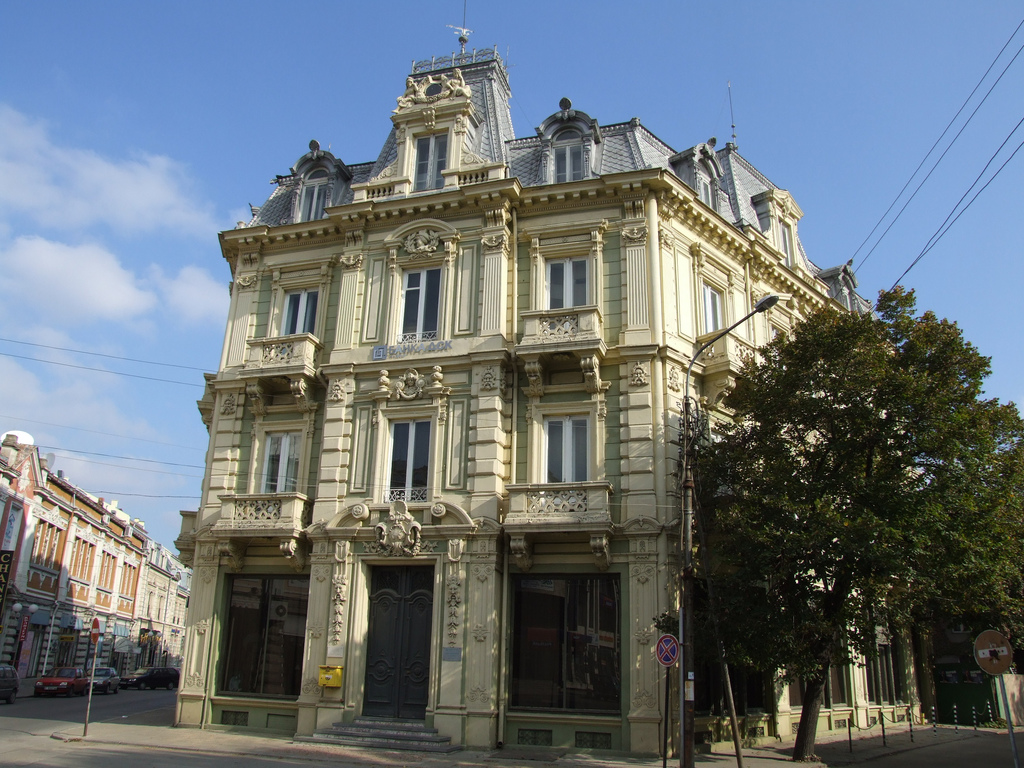
Ruse office

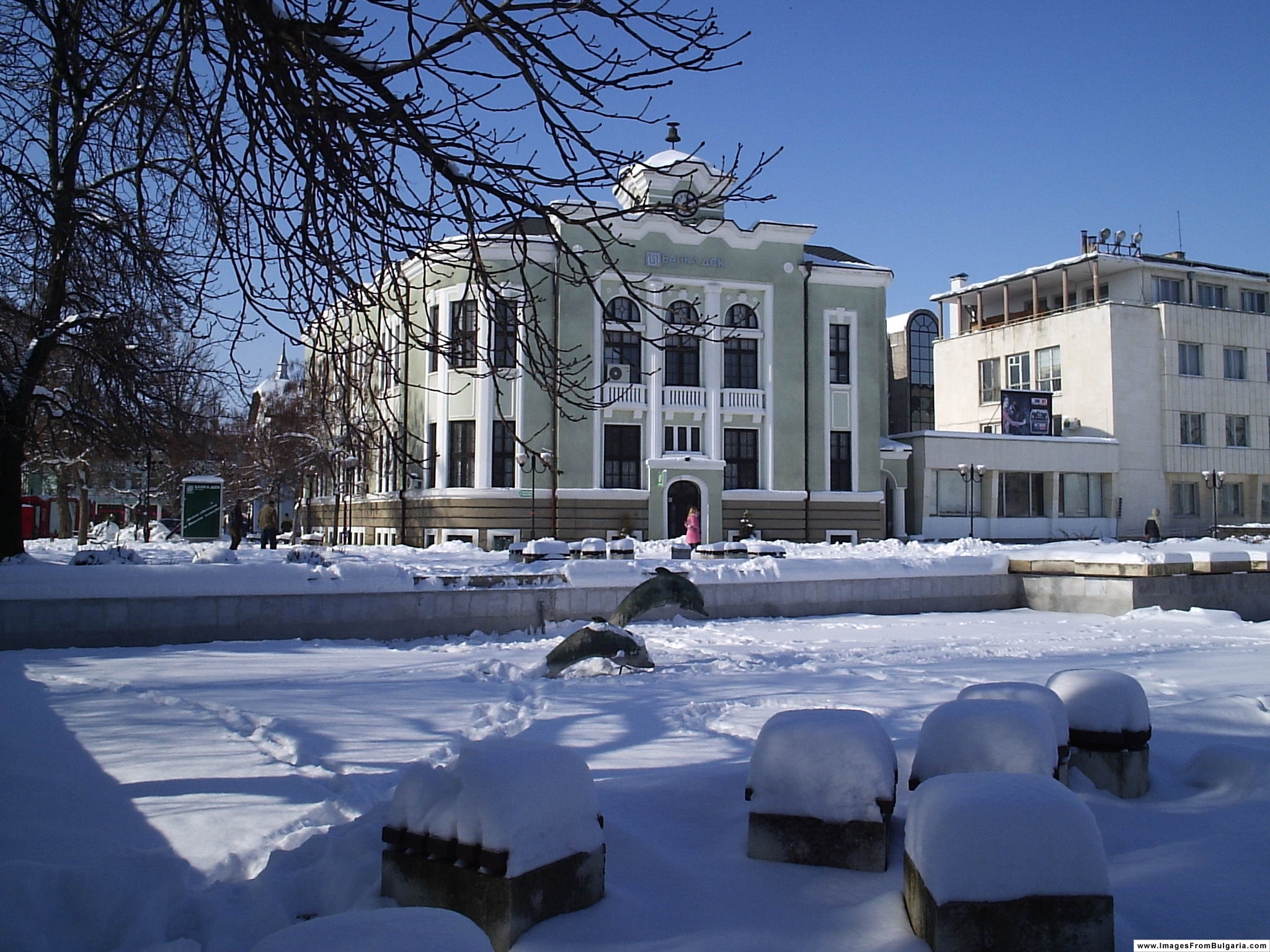
Targovishte office

DSK Bank (Bulgarian: Банка ДСК, Banka DSK; formerly Държавна спестовна каса, Darzhavna spestovna kasa — State Savings Bank) is the second biggest Bulgarian bank. It was founded in 1951 as the country's savings bank, and transformed into a joint-stock company in 1999. DSK Bank is a subsidiary of Hungarian banking group OTP Bank.

DSK Bank has been designated in 2020 as a Significant Institution under the criteria of European Banking Supervision, and as a consequence is directly supervised by the European Central Bank.

== History ==
The Bank was established under the name of the State Savings Bank (DSK) in 1951 by a decision of the Council of Ministers of the then People's Republic of Bulgaria. It included the State Savings Bank and the nationalised cooperative popular banks and agricultural credit cooperatives. It received exclusive rights to receive deposits from private individuals in the country. Initially, they were used exclusively for lending to the state, and from the mid-1960s the bank was given the opportunity to provide consumer loans and housing loans to private individuals. Until 1971, it was headed by the Ministry of Finance, and then by the Bulgarian National Bank.

== Operations ==
In April 2022, DSK Bank announced its partnership agreement with Amsterdam-based fintech software provider Backbase. Since 2020, Tamás Hack-Kovács is CEO of the bank.

== See also ==
- List of banks in the euro area
- List of banks in Bulgaria
