= Texim Bank =

Private Entrepreneurial Bank Texim
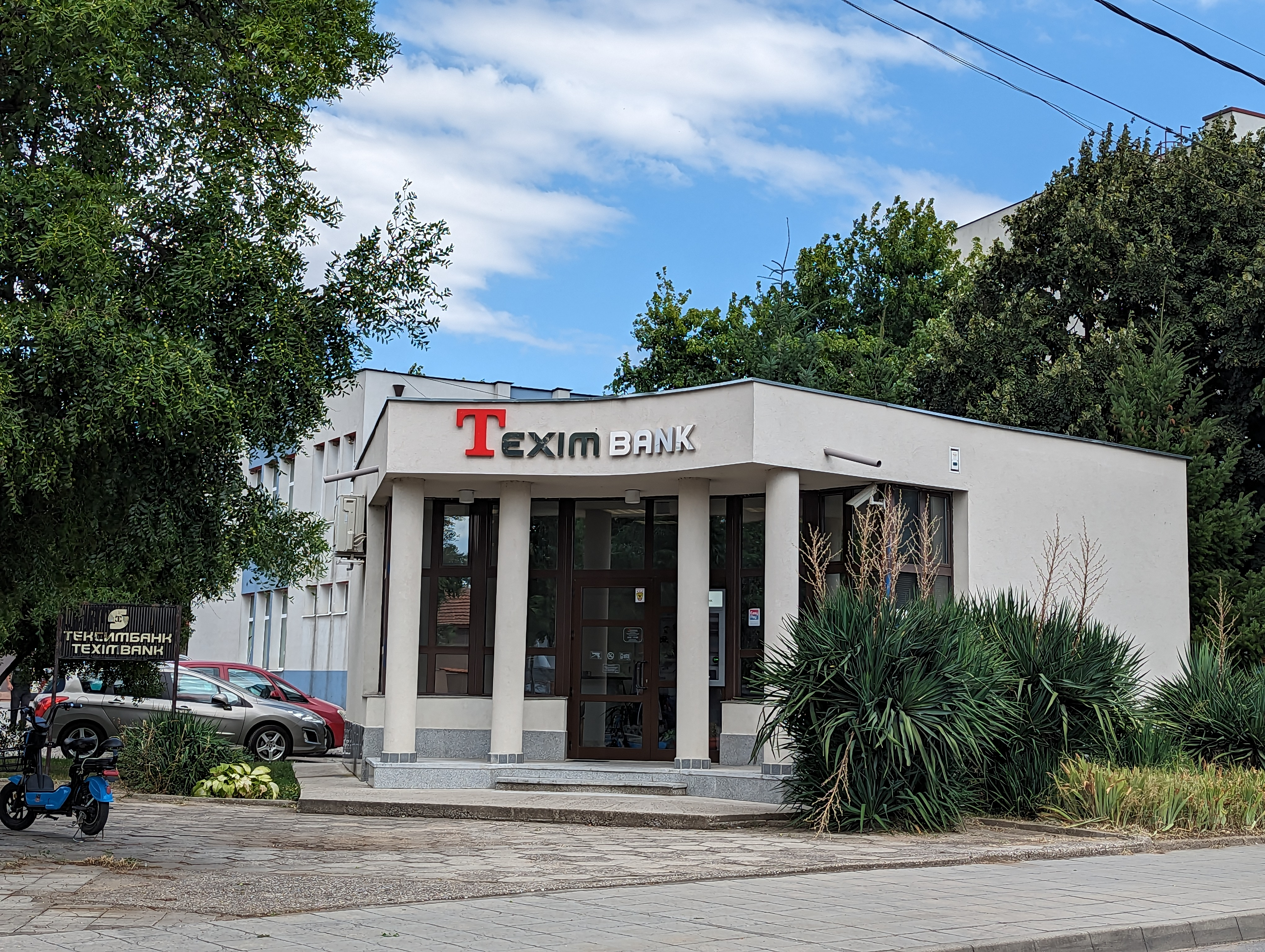
- Texim Bank office in Lyubimets
- Industry: Banking
- Founded: 1992 Teximbank
- Headquarters: Sofia, Bulgaria
- Key people: Georgi Naydenov, Founder
- Total assets: €90.10 mln (2015)
- Total equity: €17.43 mln (2015)
- Website: www.teximbank.bg

Teximbank is the oldest operating private bank in Bulgaria. It was created by Georgi Naydenov, a famous Bulgarian businessman, who created the state-owned economic group Texim in the 1960s and 1970s.

Texim was 'founded in 1960 as an export-import enterprise, and was gradually expanded to cover various additional types of activities: transport by its own ships and trucks, management of factories producing soft drinks (including Coca-Cola, for the production of which it acquired the license), management of Bulgarian mineral water springs, sale of luxury goods in special shops in Sofia and Varna, etc.' Furthermore, Texim was 'responsible for the bulk of Bulgaria's arms exports, and it is the primary distributor for most of the country's small arms and light weapons'.

Georgi Naydenov created Teximbank in September 1992, the beginning of the post-communist era. The bank was created by 'more than 4000 initial shareholders who trusted in Naydenov'. It managed to survive both Bulgarian economic crisis and restored its political and economic independence. Teximbank has proven to be a stable and reliable financial institution. The bank has a full banking license which enables it to perform transactions both in the country and abroad, and it specialises in servicing small and middle-sized businesses.

== See also ==
- List of banks in Bulgaria

== Sources ==
- Official Website of Teximbank: http://www.teximbank.bg
- Official Site of the Bulgarian National Bank: http://www.bnb.bg
- https://web.archive.org/web/20070929100501/http://www.mybulgaria.info/bulgaria/travel/information-about-bulgaria-38.html
- About the CEO of Teximbank: http://www.dksi.bg/en/AboutUs/Members/Vidolova.htm
- http://www.kampanyarchivum.hu/files/300/8/3/7-2-27.html
- Human Rights Watch
