= Central Cooperative Bank =

Central Cooperative Bank Plc. Централна кооперативна банка АД
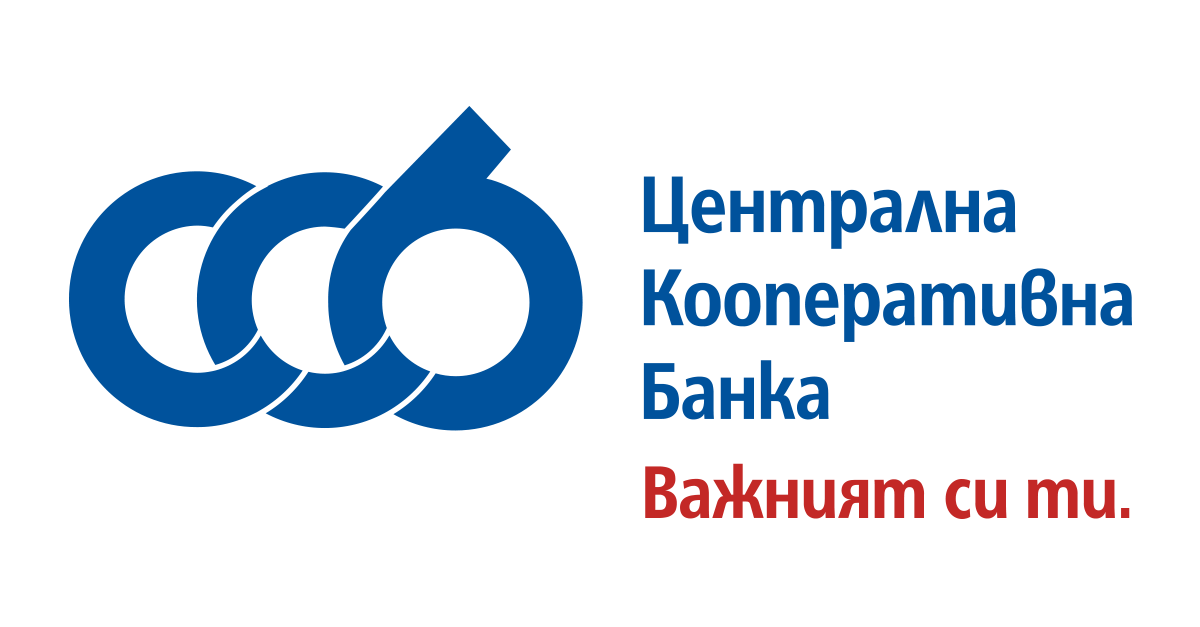

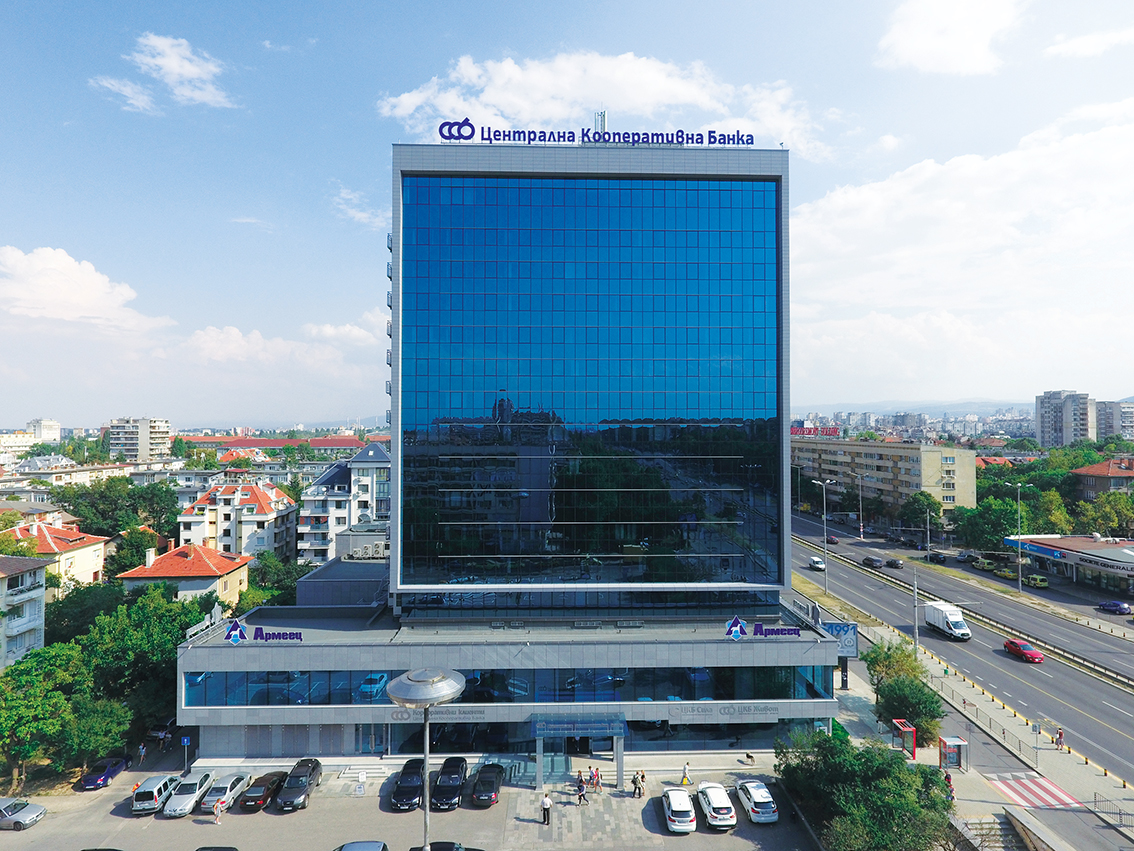
- Central Cooperative Bank's headquarters
- Company type: Public
- Industry: Financial services
- Founded: 1991
- Headquarters: Sofia, Bulgaria
- Products: Retail, private and corporate banking
- Net income: €3.84 million (2015)
- Total assets: €4.830 billion (2014)
- Owner: Chimimport AD (8.24% of direct ownership, 61.05% through CCB Group EAD)
- Website: www.ccbank.bg

Central Cooperative Bank (Bulgarian: Централна кооперативна банка, Centralna kooperativna banka), founded on 28 March 1991 is a universal commercial bank in Sofia, Bulgaria, belonging to the financial structure of CCB Group. It is listed on the Bulgarian Stock Exchange.

== History ==
- On 28 March 1991 Central Cooperative Bank was registered with a resolution of the Sofia City Court. At first, the Bulgarian National Bank Management Board issued a licence to CCB Plc for carrying out bank activity on the territory of the country.

The founders of the bank were Central Cooperative Union, the regional cooperative unions and more than 1100 cooperative organisations. In the beginning its mission was to contribute to the development of the cooperative system in Bulgaria. Passing through different development periods, the Bank established itself as a universal commercial bank nowadays.

- Since 12 March 1993, the Bank has been authorised to carry out operations abroad as well.
- Since July 1993 CCB Plc is an associate member of the European Association of Cooperative Banks, domiciled at Brussels.
- On 4 March 1999 CCB Plc received the statute of a publicly listed company, and in this way became one of the two Bulgarian banks, the shares of which were traded on the Bulgarian Stock Exchange - Sofia.
- Up to 2001 CCB Plc shareholders included: Central Cooperative Union, Bulbank AD, the State Agricultural Fund, the Bank Consolidation Company etc.
- At the beginning of 2002 the share of Bank Consolidation Company AD amounting to 32.77% was acquired through bidding by Chimimport JSC, which became the main shareholder of Central Cooperative Bank Plc.
- In 2002 CCB Plc received a licence from MasterCard Europe – a prestigious international card organisation for the issuance and acceptance of the international Maestro debit cards and MasterCard credit cards.
- In 2003 CCB Plc acquired a licence for a Bulgarian agent of Western Union, the international fast money transfer company.
- In September 2004 Central Cooperative Bank Plc became a member of the Management Board of the International Cooperative Banking Association, together with over 52 credit institutions from 36 countries.
- At the end of 2004 CCB Plc increased its capital from BGN 16 169 564 to BGN 32 338 128 via the issuance of 16 168 564 shares, having a par and issue value of BGN 1. The Bank’s main shareholder is CCB Group Assets Management EAD, which is 100% property of Chimimport Plc.
- On 27 May 2005 the Bank became a principal member of Visa International and at the beginning of 2006 we started offering the family of Visa cards.
- In September 2005 CCB Plc took a decision to increase its share capital by 50% and as of the end of the year it amounted to BGN 48 507 186, and the shareholders` equity was BGN 80,928 thousand.
- In December 2005 CCB Plc received a permit from the Central Bank of Cyprus to open its first foreign branch in Nicosia.
- On 11 May 2006 CCB Plc signed a second Syndicated Term Loan Facility, whereas the initial amount of EUR 11.000.000 was increased to EUR 27.500.000 with the participation of 12 foreign banks. The syndicated loan was arranged by HSH Nordbank AG and Raiffeizen Zentralbank Österreich AG.
- At the end of June 2006 the General Meeting of Shareholders of CCB Plc took a decision to increase the capital by 50% and at the end of the year the Bank share capital amounted to BGN 72 760 779.
- Since 1 January 2007, with Bulgaria’s accession to EU, CCB Plc has acquired the statute of a full member of the European Association of Cooperative Banks.
- In June 2007 the General Meeting of Shareholders of CCB Plc. took a decision to increase the capital and at the end of the year it amounts to BGN 83 155 thousand.
- In September 2007 the first foreign branch of CCB Plc. was opened in Nicosia, Cyprus.
- On 28 February 2008 CCB Plc acquired the Macedonian bank Sileks Bank AD Skopie, which was renamed to Central Cooperative Bank AD Skopje on 22 October 2008. At present CCB Plc has 82.57% of the voting shares of the capital of CCB AD Skopje.
- On 15 August 2008 Central Cooperative Bank Plc joined ISDA - International Swaps and Derivatives Association as a user. The contract intermediary is Raiffeizen Zentralbank Österreich AG.
- In October 2008 CCB Plc became an indirect member of EBA STEP2 SCT.
- In December 2008 CCB Plc became an indirect member of TARGET2.

== See also ==
- List of banks in Bulgaria
