= UniCredit Bulbank =

Bulgarian bank

- Founded: 1964
- Headquarters: Sofia, Bulgaria
- Key people: Teodora Petkova (CEO)
- Total assets: €14,69 mln (2022)
- Total equity: €237,21 mln (2022)
- Website: unicreditbulbank.bg

UniCredit Bulbank is the largest bank of Bulgaria. Before 1994, the bank was known as the Bulgarian Foreign Trade Bank or BFTB. UniCredit Bulbank was formed in 2007 as a merger between Bulbank, Biochim, and Hebros Bank, all of them owned by the UniCredit Group.

== History ==
Bulbank's prototype, the Bulgarian Foreign Trade Bank, started in 1964 as a fully state-owned bank, with a paid-up capital of BGL 40 million and statutory specialisation in foreign trade payments and finance. Representative offices of the Bank in London, Frankfurt, and Vienna were opened during the next two decades.

BFTB took part of the establishment of two joint stock companies in 1987 and 1998 — Bayerisch-Bulgarische Handelsbank GmbH (after 1998, HypoVereinsbank Bulgaria) with Bayerische Vereinsbank (HVB) and Bulgarsovinvest (after 1994, Corporate Commercial Bank) with Vnesheconombank, respectively.

In 1991, after the fall of the Communist regime, the Bank Consolidation Company (BCC) was founded as a holding company to consolidate the state ownership in the banking sector and to facilitate the privatisation of banks. BCC held 98% of Bulbank's share capital. Bulbank was the first Bulgarian bank to adopt SWIFT codes, whereby it significantly strengthened its operational performance and enhanced the reliability of its transactions.

The 1992 meeting of shareholders changed the bank's status to a universal commercial bank, so the branch network was expanded (Plovdiv, Kardzhali, Burgas, Stara Zagora, etc.), focusing on customer service in the years to follow.

In 1994, the meeting of shareholders passed a resolution to change the bank's name to Bulbank.

In 1998, Bulbank co-branded its international card payment system with Visa International and Europay International.

As a result of the privatisation procedure between 1998 and 2000 UniCredito Italiano possessed of 93% of the capital and Allianz had 5%. Bulbank sold its participations in Corporate Commercial Bank (99,9%), as well as that in United Bulgarian Bank (35%) and in HypoVereinsbank Bulgaria (49%).

In 2001 Bulbank's major shareholder, UniCredito, sold minor stakes to the Italian SIMEST S.p.A., Rome, and the International Finance Corporation — 2,5% and 5,3% of the share capital respectively.

Since 2006, Bulbank has been in the process of merging with HVB Bank Biochim and Hebros Bank, after UniCredit Group's merger with HVB Group in 2005.

On April 27, 2007, the legal merger between Bulbank, HVB Bank Biochim and Hebros Bank was announced. The name of the merged institution is UniCredit Bulbank.

Since 2001, the CEO of UniCredit Bulbank is Levon Hampartzoumian.

In May 2019, Teodora Petkova became the CEO and Chairman of the Management Board of UniCredit Bulbank.

== See also ==
- List of banks in Bulgaria
