= Petr Baron =

English banker and investor (born 1980)

- Петр Барон
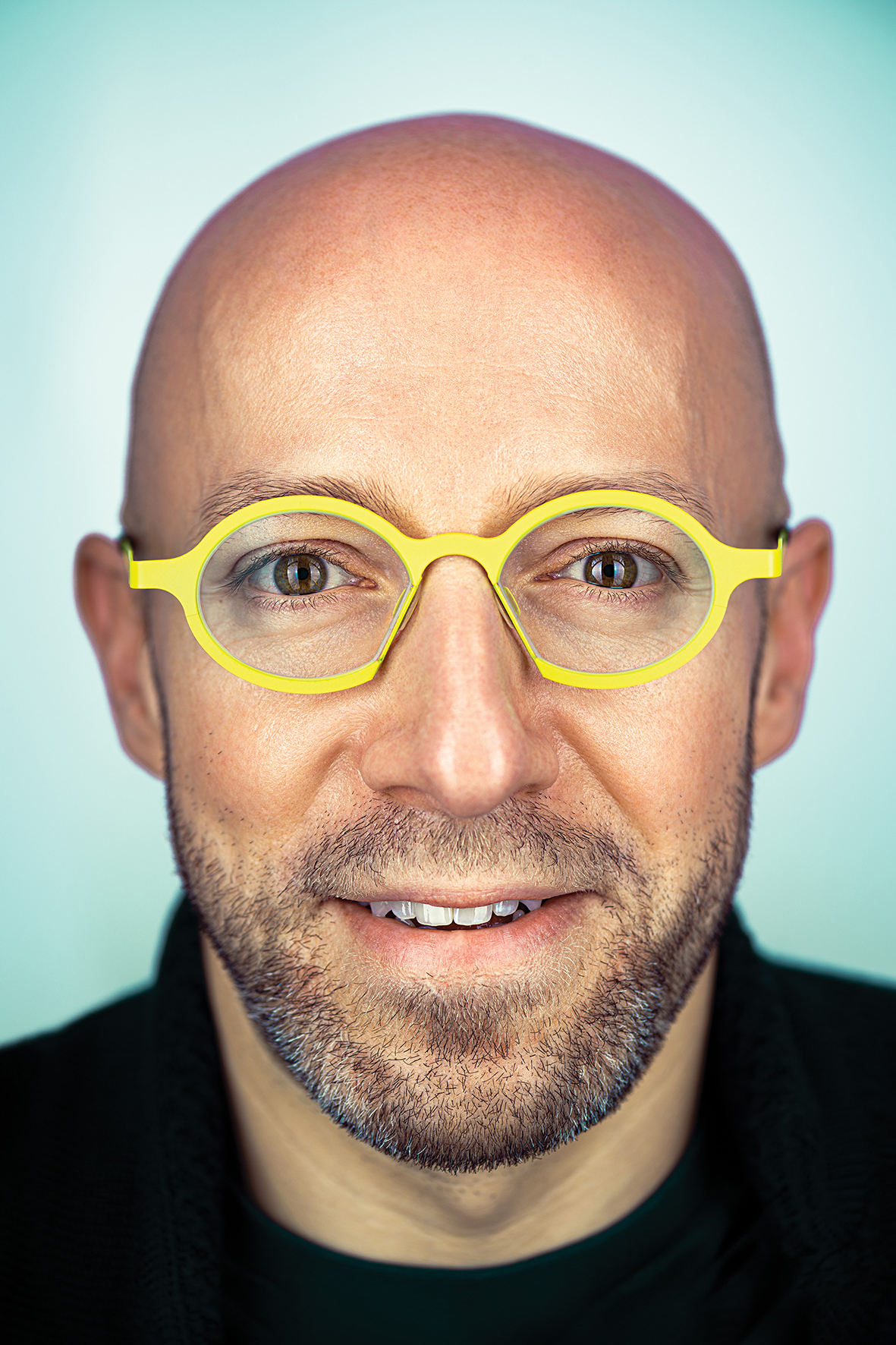
- Baron on the cover of Forbes Magazine in 2023
- Born: 28 November 1980 (age 45)
- Citizenship: British
- Education: Cass Business School
- Occupations: Banker; Entrepreneur; Angel investor
- Children: 2

Petr Baron (born 28 November 1980) is a British banker and entrepreneur who is the current CEO of TBI Bank. Baron has also been an early investor in several technology ventures.

== Early life ==
Born in Moscow, Baron immigrated to the UK as a teenager, where he attended the Taunton School between 1994 and 1999. In 2002, he earned a BSc degree in Investment and Financial Risk Management from Cass Business School.

== Career ==
Prior to taking the helm at TBI, Baron held several board positions in the finance industry across Europe. He has also made angel investments in multiple fintech ventures, including Silverbird, Finmap, Releva.ia, FintechOS, Lili, 3S Money, Swipe, ANNA Money, and Myos.

=== VAB Bank ===
Baron joined the Supervisory Board of Ukrainian VABank in 2003. Later, he was appointed as the CEO and Chairman of the bank, which was subsequently rebranded as VAB Bank. During his tenure, all nine companies in the VAB Group merged into a unified financial services supermarket in Ukraine, VAB Bank emerged as one of the most technologically advanced brands in Ukraine, and Baron was recognized as a prominent figure in the country's banking industry.

In 2008, Baron participated as a judge in two seasons of the local edition of the television program "Dragons’ Den" - known as "Business Sharks" in Ukraine.

In 2011, there was a change in ownership of VAB Bank, and due to a difference of opinions, Baron resigned from his position.

=== TBI Bank ===
Baron joined TBIF Financial Services in 2012 as Vice President of Strategy, following the company's acquisition of the Bulgarian branch of Nova Ljubljanska Banka (NBL), which was subsequently rebranded as TBI Bank. During his tenure, the Kardan Group, which owned TBIF, decided to divest its financial business. Baron played a crucial role in the 2016 acquisition of TBIF by the Latvian 4Finance Group.

In 2016, Baron assumed the role of CEO at TBI, a consumer lending bank with operations in Bulgaria, Romania, Greece, Germany, and Lithuania. Under his leadership, TBI became one of the most profitable banks in Southeastern Europe. In January 2023, Baron was featured on the cover of the Romanian edition of Forbes Magazine, where he shared his personal and TBI's story.

== Personal life ==
Petr Baron lives in London with his wife and two sons. He is also an avid art collector and dog enthusiast.
