= Georgi Naydenov (businessman) =

Georgi Ivanov Naydenov (Bulgarian: Георги Иванов Найденов) (born July 19, 1927 – October 3, 1998) was a Bulgarian businessman and banker who was born in the small town of Strelcha, and became famous during the 1960s as the creator of the unique and successful economic experiment Texim.

== The Economic Group ==
The idea of Texim as an independent organization within the Bulgarian socialist economy originated with a starting capital of 10,000 Leva (1 Dollar at that time was equal to around 1.17 Leva). Yet, although Texim existed for only 8 years from 1962 to 1969, its legendary success has accompanied the name until this day. Eventually, the experiment expanded to comprise three main units: Texim, the Imextracom Establishment, and the Bulgarian Trading Fleet. The Bulgarian Merchant Fleet included trade, shipbuilding, and docks, while Texim included the first Coca-Cola establishments in the entire communist bloc.

After the fall of communism, Naydenov created, the now oldest private bank in Bulgaria, Teximbank, in September 1992, which exists to this day.

== Sources ==
- The Texim Affair, Dobromir Zadgorski, Sofia: 1994
- Information about Bulgaria
- http://www.kampanyarchivum.hu/files/300/8/3/7-2-27.html
- "BULGARIA". Human Rights Watch.
- Interview
- Гето е преговарял с Че Гевара
- http://www.bgbook.dir.bg/book.php?ID=7290
