= Backbase =

Dutch financial technology company

Backbase BV
- Type: Besloten vennootschap
- Industry: Financial technology
- Founded: 2003; 23 years ago
- Founder: Jouk Pleiter; Gerbert Kaandorp
- Headquarters: Amsterdam, Netherlands
- Number of locations: Amsterdam, Atlanta, New York, Boise, Mexico City, Toronto, London, Cardiff, Dubai, Krakow, Singapore, Sydney, Tokyo, Hyderabad, Ho Chi Minh City
- Key people: Jouk Pleiter (CEO); Adrian McPhee (CTO); Joost van Mook (CCO); Rodrigo Graca Moura (CFO); Tim Rutten (CMO); Jodi Slomp (CPO)
- Number of employees: 2,500+ (2025)
- Website: backbase.com

Backbase is a Dutch financial technology company that provides an AI-native banking operating system. The company's software serves as an orchestration and intelligence layer for financial institutions, designed to unify data and manage customer interactions on top of legacy core banking systems. The platform is used by retail banks, commercial banks, credit unions, and neobanks.

== History ==
Backbase was founded in 2003 in Amsterdam by Jouk Pleiter and Gerbert Kaandorp. The company originally produced an Ajax framework (based on HTML, JavaScript and CSS) which eventually turned into the Backbase Customer Experience Portal. Backbase originally sold to a wide range of internet-facing businesses, including financial services, but in 2013, Pleiter pivoted the company to focus solely on financial services. In 2017, Pleiter's work at Backbase was recognized with the LOEY Award, the prize for the best online entrepreneur in the Netherlands.

The business expanded globally in the following years, opening offices in Atlanta, Singapore, and other major hubs.

In 2021, Backbase announced a strategic partnership with Microsoft, which sees the Backbase platform serving in the engagement layer within Microsoft Cloud for Financial Services.

In June 2022, Backbase received investment of €120 million from US-based private equity firm Motive Partners, giving Backbase a valuation of €2.5 billion.

In 2026, Backbase updated its strategic positioning to fully focus on artificial intelligence in banking, launching what it marketed as an 'AI-native banking operating system.' This shift aimed to transition the company's product and service offering from traditional engagement banking to a platform centered on 'Agentic AI' and unified banking operations.

== Architecture ==
Backbase develops a banking operating system designed to sit above existing core banking systems, such as mainframes or legacy databases, coordinating activity across them without replacing the underlying system of record. The system is organized into two domains: a runtime environment where workflows and automated processes execute in production, and a design-time environment used to build and configure those workflows before deployment.

=== Runtime environment ===
The runtime environment processes banking operations across digital channels, employee-facing interfaces, and automated software agents. It is structured around six layers.

- Interaction Layer: Handles interfaces for customers and employees, including web and mobile banking applications, role-based employee interfaces for functions such as customer service and relationship management, and a natural language interface for task execution and guidance.
- Orchestration Layer: Coordinates workflows across employees, automated agents, and connected systems. Supports both rule-based processes, such as loan origination and dispute resolution, and adaptive processes in which AI agents perform multi-step tasks within defined boundaries.
- Intelligence Layer: Manages the lifecycle of AI and machine learning models deployed across the system, including training, validation, serving, and monitoring. Models provide recommendations and predictions; they do not execute actions directly.
- Semantic Layer: Maintains a shared operational data model, providing a consistent view of customers, accounts, products, transactions, and cases across all parts of the system.
- Connectivity Layer: Integrates the system with external infrastructure, including core banking platforms, payment processors, CRM systems, and third-party fintech services, through APIs, event streaming, and pre-built connectors.
- Governance Layer: Enforces access controls, policy rules, and audit logging across all other layers. Each action taken by a human user or automated agent generates a recorded authorization artifact for regulatory and audit purposes.

=== Banking OS Transformation Engine ===
The Banking OS Transformation Engine provides tooling for configuring, testing, and deploying solutions to the runtime. It comprises a low-code interface for building workflows and agent configurations, pre-packaged templates for common banking functions such as onboarding and dispute handling, a deployment pipeline, operational monitoring dashboards, and a simulation environment for testing prior to production release.

== Industry recognition ==
Backbase has been recognized as a "Leader" in the digital and AI banking software market by several technology research firms:

- Omdia: Ranked as a leader in the Omdia Universe: Digital Banking Platforms, 2023 report, which evaluates vendors on solution capability and customer experience.
- IDC: Named a leader in the IDC MarketScape: North America Digital Banking Customer Experience Platforms 2022.
- Forrester: Recognized as a leader in The Forrester Wave™: Digital Banking Engagement Platforms, Q3 2021.
- Forrester: Recognized as a Leader and Customer Favorite in The Forrester Wave™: Digital Banking Engagement Platforms, Q2 2026.
- Celent: The company has also received multiple "XCelent" awards for technology and functionality in the Modern Digital Banking Channels report series.
