= First Investment Bank =

Bulgarian bank

First Investment Bank Първа инвестиционна банка

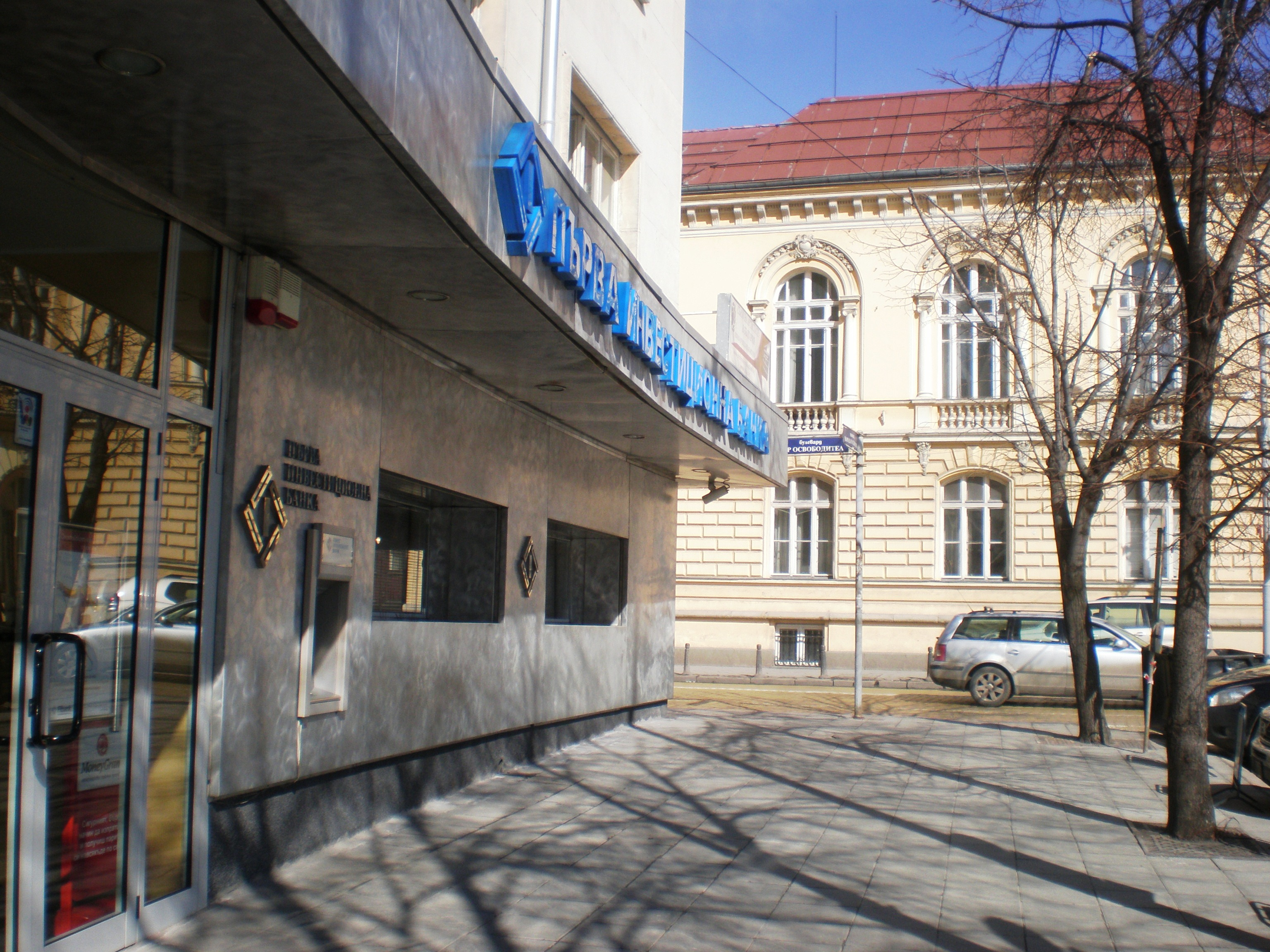
- Type: Private
- Industry: Financial services
- Founded: 8 October 1993; 33 years ago
- Headquarters: Sofia, Bulgaria
- Products: Retail, private and corporate banking
- Total assets: €10.6 billion (Q3 2026)
- Total equity: €381.19 million (2015)
- Website: www.fibank.bg/en

First Investment Bank or Fibank (Bulgarian: Първа инвестиционна банка, Parva investitsionna banka), founded on 8 October 1993, is currently (Q4 2024) the fifth largest bank in Bulgaria, both in terms of total assets (€8 billion) and market share (8.2%). The bank is the mother bank of a financial group on the Balkans - it has a branch in Albania with 10 offices, one in Cyprus, as well as a subsidiary bank in North Macedonia (Bulgarian: УНИБанка, UNIBank). First Investment Bank also controls CaSys International - an international card operator based in Skopje, North Macedonia.

In Bulgaria, it has 21 branches and 68 offices throughout the country. Its clients include 380,000 individuals and 21,000 corporate bodies.

On 18 November 2026, Eurobank Ergasias announced that it has agreed to acquire a 65% stake in Bulgaria's First Investment Bank from its two main shareholders (Tseko Minev and Ivaylo Mutafchiev) and that the acquisition will be followed by a mandatory tender offer for the remaining shares. Once the acquisition completed, Eurobank plans to merge Fibank with its Bulgarian subsidiary, Eurobank Bulgaria (Postbank), in order to create the largest bank in Bulgaria by deposits and total assets, with a market share of around 20%.

== See also ==
- List of banks in the euro area
- List of banks in Bulgaria
