= Bulgarian Postbank =

Bulgarian universal bank

Bulgarian Postbank (legally known as Eurobank Bulgaria AD)
- Type: Commercial bank
- Industry: Financial services
- Founded: 1991
- Headquarters: Sofia, Bulgaria
- Key people: Petia Dimitrova (Chairwoman)
- Products: Retail banking Corporate banking Factoring; Investment banking Asset management Loans
- Revenue: ▲€305.24 million (2016)
- Operating income: ▲€273.51 million (2016)
- Net income: ▲€119.57 million (2016)
- Total assets: ▲€6.818 billion (2016)
- Total equity: ▲€1.147 billion (2016)
- Number of employees: 3,000 (Q2 2015)
- Parent: Eurobank Ergasias
- Website: www.postbank.bg

Postbank (Bulgarian: Пощенска Банка, Poshtenska Banka), legally known as Eurobank Bulgaria AD (former legal name Eurobank EFG Bulgaria AD, date of change 11/1/2013), is a universal bank in Bulgaria.

== History ==
Bulgarian Postbank was founded on April 2, 1991 as the postal savings system of Bulgarian Posts. In the years that followed, the bank experienced substantial growth and expansion. It is one of the few Bulgarian banks that managed to survive the banking crisis in Bulgaria in 1996–1997.

Old Postbank Logo.

On November 9, 1998, 78.23% of Postbank's capital was acquired by ALICO/CEH Balkan Holdings Ltd., a subsidiary of Eurobank Ergasias. In the following years, Eurobank Ergasias control grew to more than 90% of Postbank's equity capital.

On December 21, 2006, Eurobank EFG acquired majority ownership of the Bulgarian DZI Bank, which was merged into Postbank in the third quarter of 2007 with the operational merger completing by the end of the year.

On August 29, 2011, Eurobank Ergasias and Alpha Bank announced that they have reached agreement on a merger. Alpha Bank has presence in Bulgaria since 1995 with its Sofia Branch having more than 120 offices around the country. The Alpha Bank Branch was expected to merge into Postbank operationally in 2012, but in January 2012, the merger was suspended until private sector bond writedowns, required of Greek banks as part of the EU/International Monetary Fund third rescue package to resolve the Greek government debt crisis, are finalized. The merger went through on 17 July 2015.

Following its merger with DZI Bank in 2007, the bank changed its legal name to "Eurobank Bulgaria AD", but continued doing business as the Bulgarian Postbank.

In March 2016, Postbank acquired the Bulgarian operations of the Greek Alpha Bank, becoming the fourth-largest bank in Bulgaria in terms of loans and deposits. In July 2018, Eurobank acquired Piraeus Bank Bulgaria, placing Postbank among the three largest lenders of the country.

== Description ==
Postbank is the third largest depository institution in the country, as well as the second largest mortgage lender, and the largest credit card issuer. The bank commands a market share of nearly 10%, a workforce of 3,000 employees and with over 200 locations has one of the most extensive branch networks in the country. Postbank is a member of Eurobank Ergasias Group.

Total assets of the bank reached BGN 5,637 billion as of 31 December 2012. In June 2012 the bank retained its long-term credit rating of BBB and a short-term rating of A-2 with a stable outlook from the Bulgarian Credit Rating Agency (BCRA).

Postbank is an autonomous Bulgarian bank and is fully self-funded via the local and international market. Apart from its significant deposit base, for purposes of small business and medium-sized loan financing, Postbank can draw on institutional credit lines from the European Bank for Reconstruction and Development (EBRD), the Bulgarian Development Bank, and the International Finance Corporation (IFC).

== Products and services ==
Postbank provides retail, corporate banking and investment banking services in Bulgaria. The bank offers services to its local and international customers. In regard to the retail banking products, the bank traditionally holds strong positions in mortgage lending, consumer lending and cards, and deposit products.

== Share Capital Structure ==
As of 19 May 2017, the total authorized number of ordinary shares of Eurobank Bulgaria AD was 560,323,000 with a nominal value of BGN 1 per share.

- Eurobank Ergasias S.A., Athens, Greece - 99.99%

== Key people ==
In April 2011, Postbank introduced a tiered board structure, which included a Management Board and a Supervisory Board.

=== Management Board ===
- Petia Dimitrova - Chairperson and Chief Executive Officer (CEO)
- Dimitar Shoumarov - Chief Financial Director and Executive Director
- Iordan Souvandjiev - Chief Risk Officer

=== Supervisory Board ===
- Theodoros Karakasis - Chairman of the Board
- Stavros Ioannou - Deputy Chairman of the Board
- Evangelos Kavvalos - Member
- Nikolaos Aliprantis - Member
- Christos Adam - Member

=== Procurator ===
- Milena Vaneva

==== New Head Office ====
The new head office, with total area of 12,500 m2, was inaugurated in June 2012.

== Subsidiaries ==
As of July 2017, the affiliates of Postbank which operate on the Bulgarian market include:

- ERB Leasing EAD (former name EFG Leasing EAD, date of change 01/2/2013) - leasing company
- ERB Property Services Sofia AD (former name EFG Property Services Sofia AD, date of change 25/3/2013) - a real estate operation, property valuation, and property management company
- IMO Property Investment Sofia EAD - a real estate operation and investment development company
- IMO Central Office EAD - - a real estate operation company

== Key figures ==
- Clients: Over 1.5 million
- Client deposits: €2.15 billion (end 2012)
- Client loans: €2 billion (end 2012)
- Branches: 200 (Q2 2015)

== See also ==
- List of banks in Bulgaria
