= Eurobank Ergasias =

Third largest bank in Greece

Eurobank Ergasias Services and Holdings S.A.

- Head office on Syntagma Square, Athens
- Trade name: Eurobank Holdings
- Native name: Eurobank Ergasias Υπηρεσιών και Συμμετοχών Α.Ε.
- Formerly: V. Karavasilis Tobacco Company and Bank; Karavasilis Bank; Professional Credit Bank; Bank of Athens; EFG Eurobank; EFG Eurobank Ergasias
- Type: Public
- Traded as: Athex: EUROB
- ISIN: GRS323003012
- Industry: Financial services
- Founded: 19 March 1924; 102 years ago in Athens, Greece
- Founder: Vasilios Karavasilis
- Headquarters: Athens, Greece
- Number of locations: 540 branches (2023)
- Area served: Bulgaria; Cyprus; Greece; London; United Kingdom; Luxembourg
- Key people: Fokion Karavias (CEO); George Zanias (Chairperson)
- Services: Cash management; Factoring; Forfaiting; Investment banking; Retail banking; Wealth management
- Revenue: ▲€3.4 billion (2025)
- Operating income: ▼€1.6 billion (2025)
- Net income: ▼€1.3 billion (2025)
- Total assets: ▲€107.9 billion (2025)
- Total equity: ▲€10.6 billion (2025)
- Owner: Fairfax Financial (33.29%); Capital Group Companies (5.11%); Helikon Investments (5.06%)
- Number of employees: 12,408 (2025)
- Subsidiaries: Eurobank; Eurobank Cyprus; Eurobank Private Bank Luxembourg; Postbank (99.99%)
- Capital ratio: 15.2%
- Website: eurobankholdings.gr

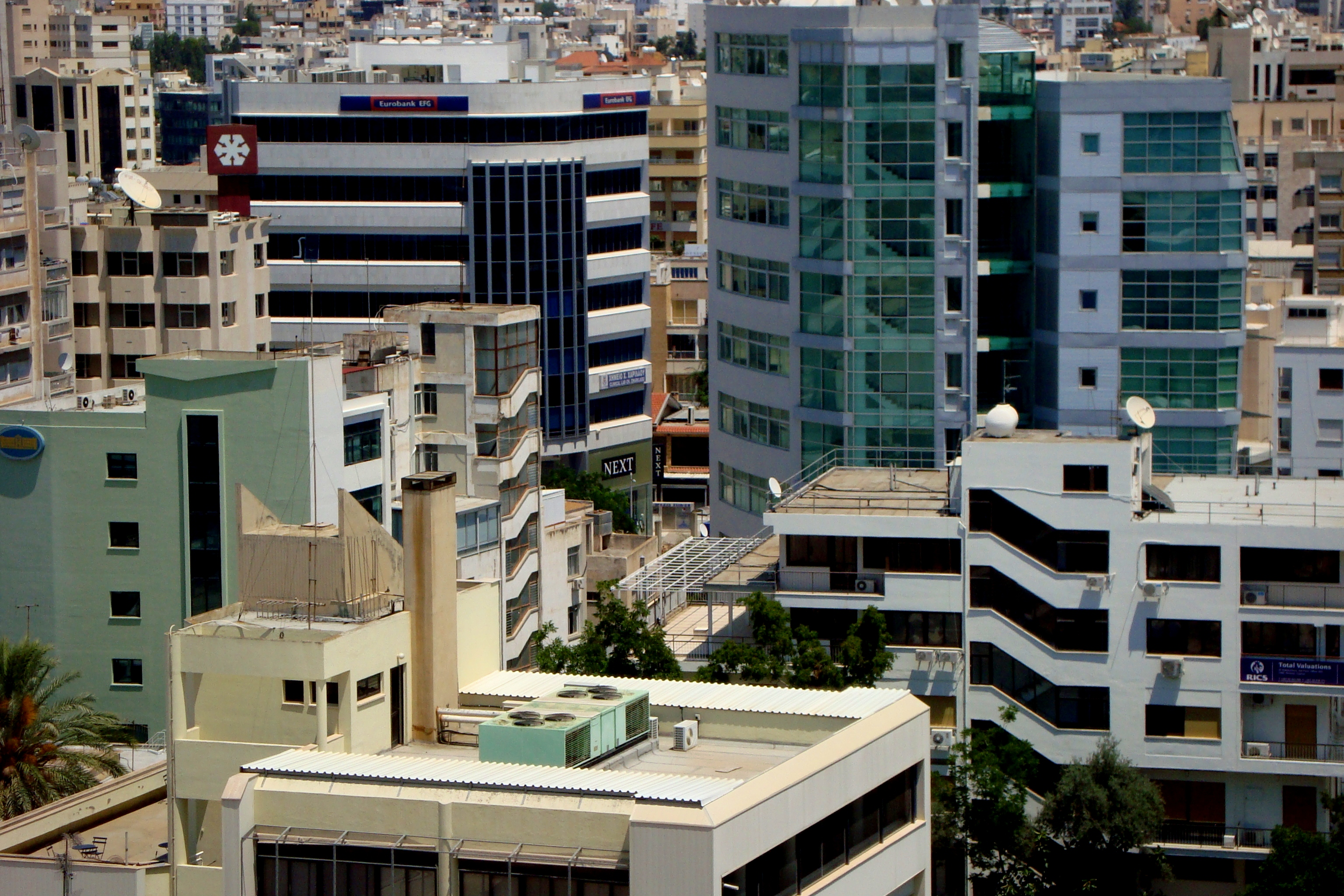
Eurobank offices in Nicosia, Cyprus

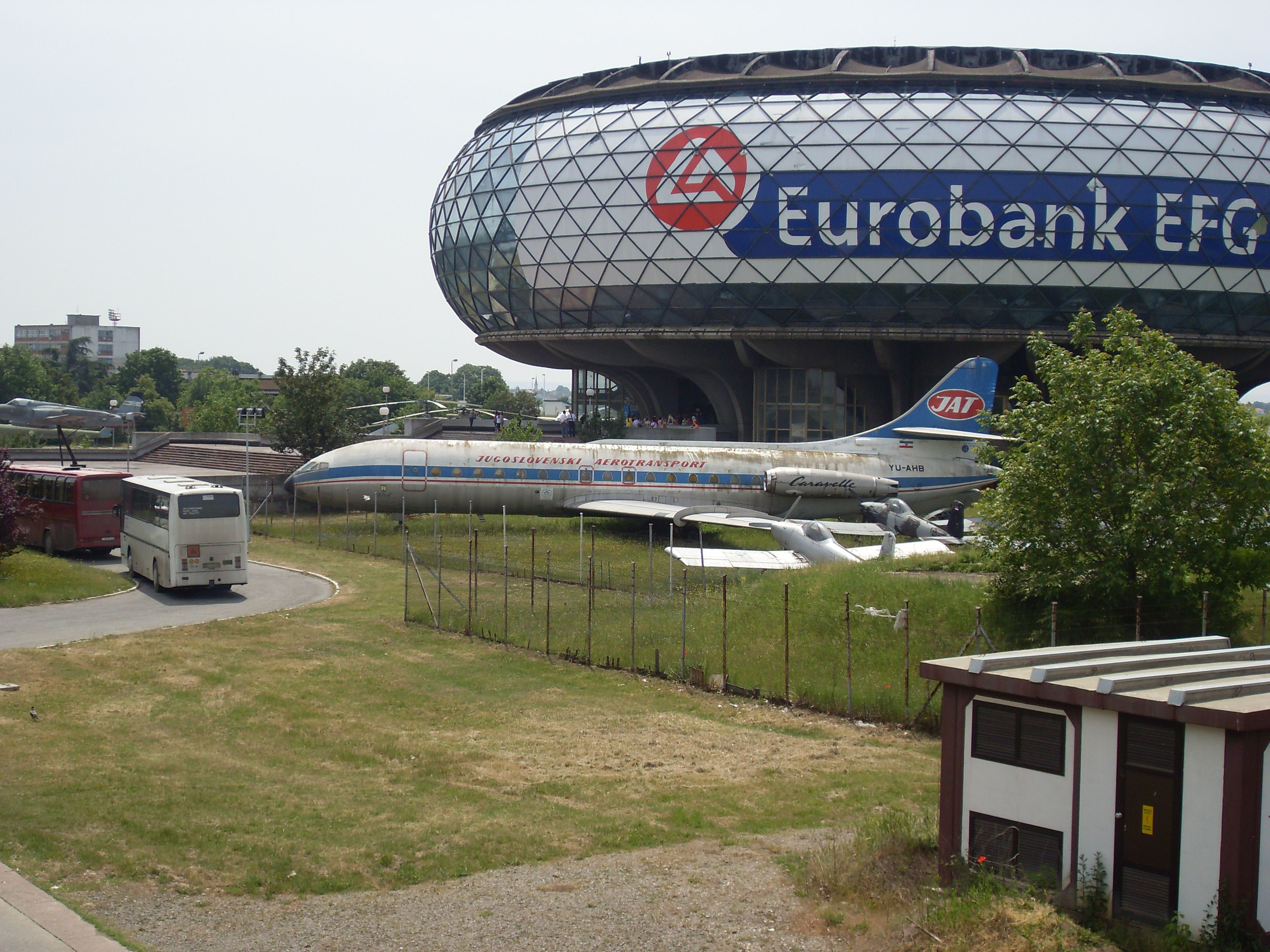
The Eurobank is the official sponsor of the Aeronautical Museum Belgrade

Eurobank is a financial organisation that operates in Greece, Cyprus, Luxembourg, Bulgaria and the UK. As of December 2025, the Eurobank Group counts, €108 billion in assets, 562 branches network in Greece and abroad and 12,408 employees.

Eurobank has been designated as a Significant Institution since the entry into force of European Banking Supervision in late 2014, and as a consequence is directly supervised by the European Central Bank.

== History ==
The bank was incorporated in 1924 as “V. Karavasilis Tobacco Company and Bank SA”. In 1937 it was renamed “Karavasilis Bank SA” and in 1952 “Professional Credit Bank SA”. In 1964 it was acquired by the National Bank of Greece, who renamed it Bank of Athens in 1992.

The Euromerchant Bank SA (Ευρωεπενδυτική Τράπεζα ΑΕ, lit. transl. euro-investment bank) was founded in 1990. It took over 75% of EFG Private Bank (Luxembourg) S.A.'s operations in 1994. In 1997 it was renamed EFG Eurobank SA and acquired Interbank Greece SA and the branch network of Crédit Lyonnais Grèce SA. In February 1999 EFG Eurobank SA merged with Cretabank SA.

In March 1999, Bank of Athens merged with EFG Eurobank SA. In 2000 the bank changed its name to EFG Eurobank Ergasias SA after taking over the renowned Ergasias Bank. In 2002 it acquired Telesis Investment Bank, followed by UnitBank in 2003. A financial products subsidiary was founded in 2007 (49.9% owned by employees).

In 2012, the bank sold 70% of the Polish branches called Polbank to Raiffeisen Bank International.

In 2012, the Spiros Latsis associated Eurobank EFG merger with Giannis Kostopoulos's (Greek: Γιάννης Κωστόπουλος) Alpha Bank was cancelled because of the Greek debt crisis. The proposed merger included a capital boost from Qatar Investment Authority of 500 million euro convertible bond and a 1.25 billion euro rights issue which would have Qatar Investment Authority a major shareholder and from Southeast Europe's biggest bank with assets of 150 billion euros and 80 billion euros of deposits.

After the Greek debt crisis and bailouts of Greek banks in 2012, Swiss-Luxembourg based EFG—the then owner of Eurobank—was told to separate the Greek bank from the rest of its business. In July of that year Eurobank was deconsolidated from the group and its shares sold to Yiannis Latsis and it was renamed Eurobank Ergasias.

In January 2013, the National Bank of Greece made an offer, which ultimately did not go through, to take over Eurobank Ergasias; 64,000 Eurobank shareholders and the Greek capital market commission agreed. Later in 2013 Eurobank acquired New TT Hellenic Postbank and New Proton Bank.

The bank was the third largest in Greece by total asset by total loans and total deposits, and the fourth by market capitalisation—as at December 2014.

Since 1 February 2015, the chairman and non-executive director of Eurobank Ergasias has been Nikolaos Karamouzis; Fokion Karavias has been the CEO and executive director since the same day. Canadian fund Fairfax Financial are major shareholders, with an 18.2% stake in 2018, that was increased after the takeover of Grivalia Properties until 32.9%.

In the end of year 2015 results, total net loans were €39.9 billion (non performing 43.8%, of which provisions were at 53.3%), customer deposits €31.4 billion, and central bank funding was €24.3 billion.

At the end of 2020, the bad loans of the group reached an amount of €5.7 billion. In March 2020, Eurobank announced a project for reducing its nonperforming loans index from 14% to 9%.

In March 2023, Eurobank sold its Serbian unit to AIK Banka for €280 million, becoming Serbia's second-largest financial conglomerate.

In March 2024, Eurobank acquired, through a subsidiary, 2.3% of the shares in ANT1 and Makedonia TV.

In September 2024, Eurobank finalised the acquisition of a 26.1% stake in Cypriot Hellenic Bank thus increasing its stake in Hellenic to 55.9 per cent of the Cypriot bank's shares. On 7 November 2024, Eurobank increased its stake in Hellenic Bank to 68.81% of the shares and announced its intention to make a full bid on Hellenic. On 11 February 2025, Eurobank announced that its stake in Hellenic Bank reached 93.47% of the shares and the launch of a mandatory public offer to acquire the remaining shares of Hellenic Bank, in order to complete the acquisition by obtaining full ownership of Hellenic Bank and then delist it from the Cyprus Stock Exchange. In June 2025, Eurobank acquired the rest of the shares in Hellenic Bank raising its ownership to 100 %. On 1 September 2025, Eurobank Ergasias finalised the merger of Hellenic Bank with its Cypriot subsidiary (Eurobank Cyprus), which discontinued the 'Hellenic Bank' brand.

In December 2025, Eurobank Ergasias Services and Holdings S.A. was absorbed by Eurobank S.A., making Eurobank S.A. the parent of the group. Eurobank S.A.'s shares began trading on the Cyprus Stock Exchange the same month, alongside its Athens Stock Exchange listing. In May 2026, Eurobank bought the remaining 80% of Eurolife Life Insurance from Fairfax for €813 million. In May 2026, Eurobank sold its remaining 20% stake in Worldline Greece to Worldline for €72 million. In July 2026, Eurobank and Inbank agreed to establish joint venture in Greece offering buy-now-pay-later, sales-finance and consumer-lending products.

On 18 November 2026, Eurobank announced that it has agreed to acquire a 65% stake in Bulgarian lender First Investment Bank from its two main shareholders (Tseko Minev and Ivaylo Mutafchiev) and that the acquisition will be followed by a mandatory tender offer for the remaining shares. Once the acquisition completed, Eurobank plans to merge Fibank with its Bulgarian subsidiary, Eurobank Bulgaria (Postbank), in order to create the largest bank in Bulgaria by deposits and total assets, with a market share of around 20%.

== Major acquisitions ==
- In 1998, 78.23% of Postbank was taken over.
- In 2000 Acquisition of a 19.25% participation in Bancpost in Romania, which was later increased
- In 2002 EFG Eurobank Ergasias – Telesis Investment Bank merger. Acquisition of 50% in Alico / CEH Balkan Holdings leading to a 43% participation in Postbank.
- In 2003 Merger through absorption of "Ergoinvest S.A.". Merger by absorption of "Investment Development Fund S.A.". Establishment of Euroline Retail Services (Romania) - 80% Eurobank Cards and 19.961% Bancpost. Establishment of Eurocredit Retail Services (Cyprus) as a 100% subsidiary of Eurobank Cards.
- In 2004 Establishment of Euroline Retail Services AD (Serbia) - 100% subsidiary of Eurobank Cards
- In 2006 Acquisition of 100% of Nacionalna štedionica–banka in Serbia and forming Eurobank a.d.
- In 2006 Acquisition of 70% of Tekfenbank, which is a Turkish bank, 99.3% of Universal Bank in Ukraine and 74.3% of Postbank.
- On 23 December 2012, Eurobank sells all its shares (70%) of the Tekfenbank to Kuwait's Burgan Bank.
- During 2014, Eurobank receives a total of $1.55 billion from several investors including Wilbur Ross (€37.5 million) and the Prem Watsa founded Fairfax Financial (€400 million).
- On 16 January 2015, Eurobank asks Greek Central Bank for Emergency Liquidity Assistance (ELA)
- On 17 July 2015 the subsidiary Postbank buys the Bulgarian branches of fellow Greek lender Alpha Bank.
- In April 2018, its Romanian subsidiary, Bancpost, was sold to Banca Transilvania, the largest Romanian bank.
- In November 2018, Eurobank announced the acquisition of the real estate investment company Grivalia Properties, controlled by Fairfax Financial through its 51% stake. Fairfax increased its stake in Eurobank after the takeover from 18% to 32.9%. In the same month, Eurobank acquired Piraeus Bank's banking subsidiary in Bulgaria (PBB).
- In 2024-2025, Eurobank acquired lender Hellenic Bank and merged it with its Cypriot subsidiary, which has been operating as Eurobank Cyprus since September 2025.

== Branches ==
=== Serbia ===
Eurobank Direktna (Eurobank Direktna akcionarsko društvo Beograd) is a bank founded in 1997, with headquarters in Belgrade, Serbia. In March 2003, Eurobank acquired 68% of Postbanka AD Beograd and eventually renamed it EFG Eurobank AD Beograd. This was followed by the merger with Nacionalna štedionica Banka. In October 2006, the bank began operating under a single brand, name and visual identity. In 2016, the bank had €1.337 billion in assets and revenue of €18.42 million. In December 2021, the bank merged with Direktna Banka and was renamed to Eurobank Direktna. In November 2023, Serbian AIK Banka bought the majority of shares of the bank, for a total of 280 million euros.

== See also ==
- List of banks in the euro area
- List of banks in Greece
