= Bulgarian Stock Exchange =

Stock exchange in Sofia, Bulgaria

- Българска фондова борса
- Type: Stock Exchange
- Location: Sofia, Bulgaria
- Founded: 1991
- Owner: Ministry of Finance (50.5%); Public companies (49.5%)
- Currency: Euro
- Market cap: €8.2 billion (2026)
- Indices: SOFIX; BG40; BGTR30; BGREIT
- Website: www.bse-sofia.bg/en/

The Bulgarian Stock Exchange (BSE; Bulgarian: Българска фондова борса, Romanized: Bulgarska fondova borsa) is the sole licensed and operating stock exchange in Bulgaria. It was founded on 10 October 1991.

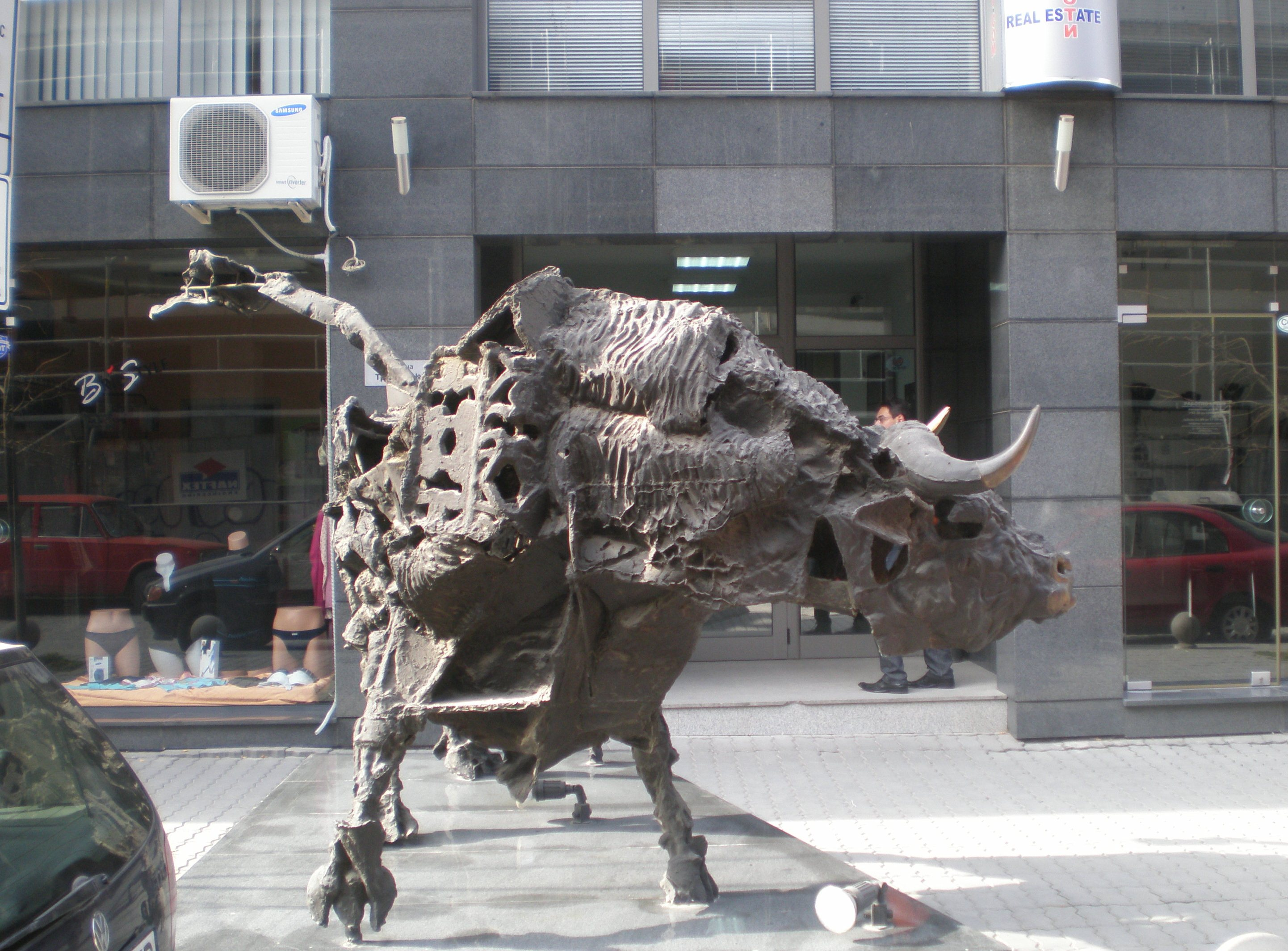
The bull statue in front of the BSE building in Sofia

The BSE is 50.5% owned by the Bulgarian government, which is actively seeking potential investors, some of them being the Frankfurt Stock Exchange, Athens Stock Exchange, OMX, and the Prague Stock Exchange.

The exchange has a pre-market session from 9:00 am to 9:20 am, regular trading hours from 9:20 am to 1:45 pm, and a post-market session from 1:45 pm to 4:00 pm on all days of the week except Saturdays, Sundays, and holidays.

== History ==
The original exchange, the Sofia Stock Exchange, which had been established by a tsar's decree in 1914, ceased to operate after the Second World War as Bulgaria became a communist state.

BSE's first index, the SOFIX, was created in October 2000, followed by three additional indices over the years.

In January 2011, the stock exchange itself (Symbol: BSO) was added to regular market trading.

In June 2018, the name of the exchange was shortened from "Bulgarian Stock Exchange – Sofia" to "Bulgarian Stock Exchange".

In August 2023, the company formed EuroCTP as a joint venture with thirteen other bourses in an effort to provide a consolidated tape for the European Union as part of the Capital Markets Union proposed by the European Commission.

In July 2024, BSE launched a new stock exchange segment called EuroBridge, in cooperation with Deutsche Börse, which provide dual listing of companies on BEST and Deutsche Börse’s XETRA market.

== Indices ==
The Bulgarian Stock Exchange maintains the following indices:

- SOFIX
- BG40
- BGTR30
- BGREIT

== Index Trackers and International Connectivity ==
Passive exposure to the main equity index SOFIX for international investors is possible through an exchange-traded fund - Expat Bulgaria SOFIX UCITS ETF - traded in euro, listed in Frankfurt on Xetra (ticker: BGX, ISIN: BG9000011163) and on the London Stock Exchange. The fund acts as a conduit for capital flows between the international financial markets and the Bulgarian capital market.

== See also ==
- Central Depository AD
- Expat Bulgaria SOFIX UCITS ETF on Xetra
- Expat Bulgaria SOFIX UCITS ETF on the London Stock Exchange
