= 1882 Bulgarian parliamentary election =

- 29 November 1882
- All 47 seats in the National Assembly; 24 seats needed for a majority
Party	Leader	Seats	+/–
Conservative Party	Konstantin Stoilov	47	−279
This lists parties that won seats. See the complete results below.
Prime Minister before	Prime Minister after
Leonid Sobolev; Sobolev (Ind. + Con.)	Leonid Sobolev; Sobolev (Ind. + Con.)

Parliamentary elections were held in Bulgaria in 1882 to elect members of the III Ordinary National Assembly. As part of the amendments proposed by Prince Alexander of Battenberg after the 1881 coup at the II Grand National Assembly, the number of representatives was reduced from 307 to 47, the lowest in Bulgarian history. The Liberal Party boycotted the election, resulting in another Conservative majority. The Assembly convened on 10 December 1882.

== Aftermath ==
1883 saw growing Russian influence and increasing disagreements between the Russian representatives (notably the generals Alexander Kaulbars and Prime Minister Leonid Sobolev) and Prince Alexander I over foreign and domestic policies, such as railway construction. Prompted by a bipartisan effort in the Assembly, Alexander restored the Tarnovo Constitution on 6 September 1883, resulting in the generals' departure. Dragan Tsankov formed a coalition government between Liberals and Conservatives. This was opposed by the hardline liberals led by Petko Karavelov.

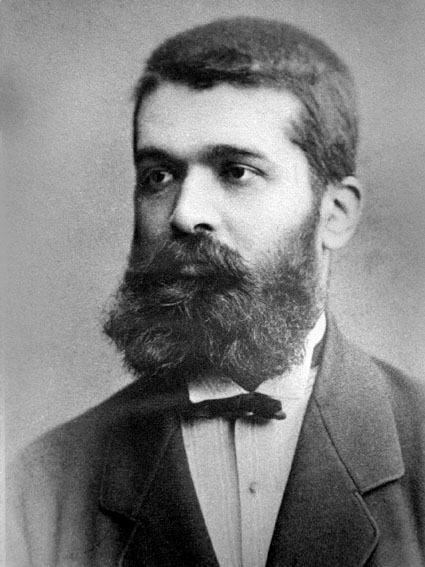

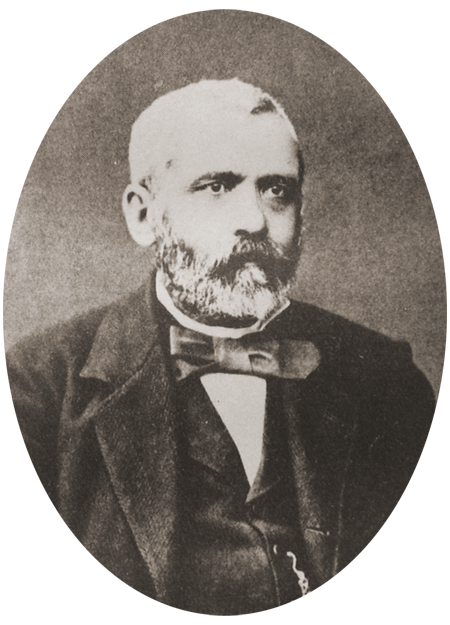

The compromise between the political enemies Grigor Nachovich (Cons.) and Dragan Tsankov (Lib.) resulted in the restoration of the Tarnovo constitution.
