= 1881 Bulgarian Constitutional Assembly election =

- 14 June 1881
- All 328 seats in the Grand National Assembly; 168 seats needed for a majority
| Party | Leader | Seats | +/– |
|---|---|---|---|
| Conservative Party | Konstantin Stoilov | 326 | +276 |
| Liberal Party | Dragan Tsankov; Petko Karavelov; Petko Slaveykov | 2 | −101 |
This lists parties that won seats. See the complete results below.
| Prime Minister before | Prime Minister after |
|---|---|
| Johan Ehrnrooth; Ehrnrooth (Ind. + Con.) | - Sixth (Ind. + Con.) |

Parliamentary elections were held Bulgaria on 14 June 1881 to elect the 328 members of the II Grand National Assembly, tasked with voting on the amendments to the Tarnovo Constitution, proposed by Prince Alexander of Battenberg after the 1881 coup. The result was a victory for the pro-Battenberg Conservatives.

== Results ==
The Liberal Party expected to win another victory, however Russia backed Battenberg's regime and the Russian army was used to control the results. Only two liberal MPs were elected.

| Party | Seats | +/– |
|---|---|---|
| Conservative Party | 326 | +276 |
| Liberal Party | 2 | –101 |
| Total | 328 | +166 |

== Aftermath ==
On 1 July the Grand National Assembly convened in Svishtov. and approved the amendments to the constitution proposed by prince Alexander I of Battenberg in less than two hours. They were similar to the Conservative's proposals during the first constitutional assembly elections in 1879 and included restricting civil liberties and reducing the size of the National Assembly, effectively suspending the constitution and making Bulgaria an authoritarian dictatorship.

The regime was supported both by the European great powers and by Russia. In July the government resigned and was replaced by one directly led by Battenberg. A state council was formed as a legislative body after the dissolution of the Assembly. Several liberal leaders were improsined, while others fled to Eastern Rumelia. Many reforms were implemented, notably the Foreign and War ministries were overhauled and expanded. The Conservatives favoured a French proposal for the construction of Bulgaria's railway network, while the Russian generals led by the diplomant Mihail Hitrovo supported an offer from a Russian company, which resulted in the change of the government after Prince Alexander convined Alexander III of Russia to recall Hitrovo and dispatch a general, Leonid Sobolev, to lead a new government and elections were called.
