= Sobolev Government =

- 7th Cabinet of Bulgaria

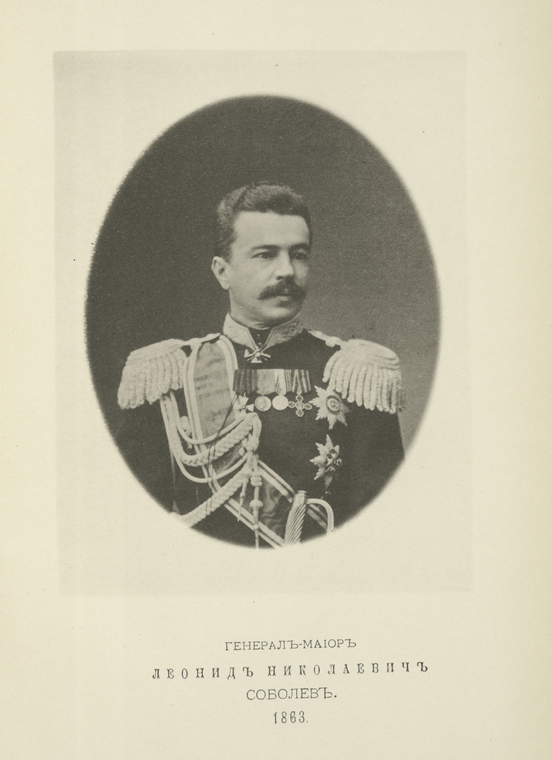
- Date formed: 23 June 1882
- Date dissolved: 7 September 1883

People and organisations
- Head of government: Alexander of Battenberg

History
- Predecessor: Shesto Government
- Successor: Second Dragan Tsankov Government

The Leonid Sobolev Government was the seventh government of the Principality of Bulgaria, appointed by Knyaz Alexander I of Battenberg with Decree No. 466 on June 23, 1882. It governed until 7 September 1883, when it was succeeded by the second government of Dragan Tsankov.

== Policies ==
The cabinet supported the Regime of Full Powers, which was the main characteristic of its domestic policy. At the same time, the government restored the activities of the National Assembly and lifted the heavy censorship on the press. In foreign policy, priority was given to the development of Bulgarian-Russian relations in political and economic aspects. The generals' views largely coincided with the program of the members of the Conservative Party in the government. This is also the reason why there was cooperation between them during the first months of their administration.

A new electoral law was adopted, defining the needed qualifications for property and education in order to vote. Officials were being stripped of their eligibility to be elected, the number of representatives in the National Assembly was reduced, and their term was extended to six years. The Knyaz retained the right to appoint the vice-speaker and the speaker of the National Assembly. The purpose of this law was to limit liberals' access to power. The result of its adoption was the first victory of the conservatives in the elections for the Third National Assembly on December 10, 1882. During his work, a number of laws were passed, including the Territorial-Administrative Division Act, the Officials Act, the Act on the Conversion of the Natural Tithe to a Monetary Tax, and others.

Relations between the generals and conservatives have deteriorated sharply in connection with the public debates on priorities in railway construction. Conservatives insisted that Bulgaria first fulfill its obligations under the Treaty of Berlin – the construction of the Tsaribrod-Vakarel section, which would connect it to Western Europe. Russian generals were keen on giving priority to the Danube Railway, to ensure connections with Russia. Disagreements in the cabinet forced Sobolev and Kaulbars to seek cooperation with the liberals. This made the conservatives to take harsh actions and leave the government, which led to the Russian generals concentrating all political power in their hands. The departing conservatives were replaced by liberals in the departments they once managed.

Sobolev and Kaulbars became enemies and a major threat to Alexander I . In order to stabilize his position, the Knyaz once again sought the help of the Russian Emperor, requesting that GeneralCasimir Ehrnrooth be returned to Bulgaroa and take power again, but his request was refused. Instead, Alexander Yonin, a Russian diplomat who supported the cabinet, was sent to Sofia.

Gen. Kazimir Ernrot to return to Bulgaria and take power again, but he is refused. Instead, Alexander Yonin, a Russian diplomat who supports the cabinet, has been sent to Sofia. The prince's position was further weakened by the diplomatic attack on Bulgaria. Turkey and Greece raised the issue of waqf properties (ownership of Turkish estates), and attempted to close the Exarchate. Austria-Hungary and Germany opposed the Knyaz's initiative for Balkan alliance. The difficult international situation and the increased movement for the restoration of the Tarnovo Constitution forced the monarch to restore the Constitution on 6 September 1883, and to dissolve the cabinet.

== Cabinet ==
Portfolio	Minister	Took office	Left office	Party
Prime Minister	Leonid Sobolev	23 June 1882	7 September 1883	Imperial Russian Army
Minister of the Interior	Leonid Sobolev	23 June 1882	4 April 1883	Imperial Russian Army
Minister of Foreign Affairs and Religion	Georgi Valkovich	23 June 1882	14 January 1883	Conservative party
Minister of National Education	Georgi Teoharov	23 June 1882	3 March 1883	Independent
Minister of Finance	Grigor Nachovich	23 June 1882	3 March 1883	Conservative party
Minister of Justice	Dimitar Grekov	23 June 1882	3 March 1883	Conservative party
Minister of War	Alexander von Kaulbars	23 June 1882	7 September 1883	Imperial Russian Army
Minister of Public Buildings, Agriculture, and Trade	Georgi Valkovich	23 June 1882	17 September 1882	Conservative party

=== Changes in the Cabinet ===
17 September 1882

Portfolio	Minister	Took office	Left office	Party
Minister of Public Buildings, Agriculture, and Trade	Leonid Sobolev	17 September 1882	14 January 1883	Imperial Russian Army

14 January 1883

Portfolio	Minister	Took office	Left office	Party
Minister of Foreign Affairs and Religion	Konstantin Stoilov	14 January 1883	3 March 1883	Conservative party
Minister of Public Buildings, Agriculture, and Trade	Grigor Nachovich	14 January 1883	3 March 1883	Conservative party

3 March 1883

Portfolio	Minister	Took office	Left office	Party
Minister of Foreign Affairs and Religion	Kiryak Tsankov	3 March 1883	7 September 1883	Liberal party
Minister of National Education	Dimitar Agura	3 March 1883	7 September 1883	Liberal party
Minister of Finance	Todor Burmov	3 March 1883	7 September 1883	Conservative party
Minister of Justice	Georgi Teoharov	3 March 1883	23 June 1883	Liberal party
Minister of Public Buildings, Agriculture, and Trade	Mikhail Khilkov	3 March 1883	7 September 1883	Liberal party

4 April 1883

Portfolio	Minister	Took office	Left office	Party
Minister of the Interior	Nestor Markov	4 April 1883	7 September 1883	Liberal party

23 June 1883

Portfolio	Minister	Took office	Left office	Party
Minister of Justice	Hristo Stoyanov	23 June 1883	7 September 1883	Liberal party

== Notable Events ==
- October 1882 – Bulgarian-Turkish diplomatic relations were fully restored with the help of Russian mediation after nearly two years of interruption due to the non-admission of Turkish refugees returning to the Principality.
- 10 December 1882 – The 3rd National Assembly, dominated by the majority of the Conservative party, begins its work.
- 13 January 1883 – The National Assembly approves a bill that would turn the Bulgarian National Bank into a joint-stock company.
- 3 March 1883 - The exile of bishop Meletius from the Sofian archibishopric results in a rift between Sobolev and his conservative ministers Stoilov, Nachovich, and Grekov. The conservatives withdraw from the government.
- 28 April 1883 – A railway convention with Austria-Hungary is concluded after two years of negotiations. Bulgaria undertakes to build the last section of the railway between Vienna and Istanbul at its own expense by 1886.
- 16 June 1883 – The debt convention with Russia was signed.
- 14-21 August 1883 – The Liberal Party wins the elections to fill the parliament and reduce the majority of the conservatives in the 3rd National Assembly.
