= Shesto Government =

Sixth "Shesto" Government
- 6th Cabinet of Bulgaria

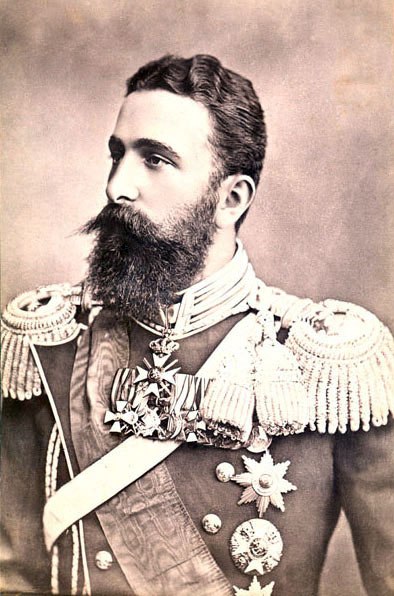
- Date formed: 1 July 1881
- Date dissolved: 23 June 1882

People and organisations
- Knyaz: Alexander of Battenberg
- Head of government: Alexander of Battenberg

History
- Predecessor: Ehrnrooth Government
- Successor: Sobolev Government

The Sixth "Shesto" government of Bulgaria was the government of the Principality of Bulgaria, appointed by Knyaz Alexander I of Battenberg with Decree No. 565 on July 1, 1881, and was under his direct leadership. Ruled until June 23, 1882 under the so-called "Regime of Full Powers," then succeeded by the government of Leonid Sobolev. This is the only Bulgarian government without a prime minister.

== Policies ==
Immediately after the Second Grand National Assembly completed its work, a new cabinet without a prime minister was formed, in which the conservatives and Russian generals played a leading role. The knyaz skillfully used the military generals and their Russian influence to solidify his position after the coup.During its one-year administration, the government conducted a number of constructive reforms: the Ministry of Foreign Affairs and Religion was restructured according to a more modern European model; a State Council was formed; the gendarmerie came under the authority of the Ministry of War. A committee has been organized to resolve the rural landlord issue; rules for the construction of private buildings have been approved, and a Commission for the Implementation, Completion, and Ordering of the Judicial Process has been appointed. The first curricula and statutes of the Pedagogical School have been developed.

The government conducted a very repressive policy against its political opponents. The leaders of the Liberal Party Dragan Tsankov and Petko Slaveykov were imprisoned. The Press Law was amended in a way to make journalists require a permit from the Ministry of Interior in order to publish in a newspaper. Protest meetings and rallies were in one way or another prohibited by law.

Addressing issues related to rail transport was a major priority for the cabinet's foreign policy. Conservatives supported the project of a French company for the construction of the Bulgarian railway network as they found it the most beneficial for national interests. On the other side Russian generals and diplomatic representatives in the country were supportive of the offer of a Russian company. Disagreements in the cabinet over the railway issue were starting to strain on the Bulgarian-Russian relations. The knyaz was trying to stabilize the domestic political situation in the country by forming a new coalition cabinet with the participation of Dragan Tsankov's moderate liberals and conservatives, but his attempts ended in failure.

The disagreements between the two factions regarding the Regime of the Mandates proved insurmountable. To resolve the crisis, the knyaz once again used the authority of Russia, and on 15 April 1892, during his visit to St. Petersburg, he managed to persuade Emperor Alexander III to recall diplomat Hitrovo and send Russian General Leonid Sobolev to Bulgaria to head a new cabinet.

== Cabinet ==
| Portfolio | Minister | Took office | Left office | Party |
|---|---|---|---|---|
| Minister of the Interior | Arnold Remlingen | 1 July 1881 | 31 December 1881 | Imperial Russian Army |
| Minister of Foreign Affairs and Religion | Konstantin Stoilov | 1 July 1881 | 30 July 1881 | Conservative party |
| Minister of National Education | Konstantin Jireček | 1 July 1881 | 23 June 1882 | Conservative party |
| Minister of Finance | Georgi Zhelyazkovich | 1 July 1881 | 23 June 1882 | Conservative party |
| Minister of Justice | Georgi Teoharov | 1 July 1881 | 23 June 1882 | Independent |
| Minister of War | Vladimir Krylov | 1 July 1881 | 15 April 1882 | Imperial Russian Army |

=== Changes in Cabinet ===
| Portfolio | Minister | Took office | Left office | Party |
|---|---|---|---|---|
| Minister of Foreign Affairs and Religion | Georgi Valkovich | 30 July 1881 | 23 June 1882 | Conservative party |
| Minister of the Interior | Grigor Nachovich | 31 December 1881 | 23 June 1882 | Conservative party |
| Minister of War | Ivan Lesovoy | 15 April 1882 | 21 June 1882 | Imperial Russian Army |
| Minister of War | Alexander von Kaulbars | 21 June 1882 | 23 June 1882 | Imperial Russian Army |

== Notable Events ==
- 1 July 1881 – By decision of the Second Grand National Assembly, a "Regime of Full Powers" was established for Knyaz Alexander I. The same day, Prime Minister Kasimir Ehrnrooth resigned and the knyaz appointed a new composition of the council of ministers without the sanction of the members of Parliament.
- September 1881 – The institution of extraordinary commissioners, introduced after the April coup d'état of the same year, was abolished in an attempt to calm public life.
- 31 December 1881 - Conservative Grigor Nachovich heads the Ministry of the Interior after Russian Colonel Arnold Remlingen is removed from office due to the temporary ban on the conservative newspaper "Bulgarian Voice."
- 1 January 1882 - The State Council, which developed and approved legislation during the Regime of Capacities, began its work.
- 6 February 1882 – As a measure against the growing agitation for the restoration of the Tarnovo Constitution, the authorities imprisoned the leader of the liberals Dragan Tsankov in Vratsa.
