= State Council of the Principality of Bulgaria =

The State Council of the Principality of Bulgaria (Bulgarian: Държавният съвет на Княжество България) is an organ of the Principality of Bulgaria established by the Second Grand National Assembly of Bulgaria that lasted during Prince Alexander of Battenberg period of authoritarian rule (1881-1883).

== History ==
The initial composition of the State Council, appointed by a princely decree on 31 December 1881, included Todor Ikonomov, Todor Burmov, Marko Balabanov, Dimitar Grekov, Evlogi Georgiev, Yurdan Todorov, Nikola Daskalov, Georgi Shopov, Georgi Tishev, Nikola Mihaylovski and Hadji Mehmed Ali. The first chairman of the Council was Todor Ikonomov, succeeded in January 1883 by Georgi Valkovich. According to the statute, the composition of the State Council must be renewed every three years. It was officially formed on 14 January 1882.

As a result of the introduced qualification of candidates having to have held high positions in the state and judicial administration and the confusion in the Liberal Party after the coup d'état of April 1881, the 1881 Bulgarian Constitutional Assembly election for the State Council in the autumn of the same year were won convincingly by the Conservative Party, which supported Battenberg's ambitions for unlimited power. It failed to fulfill its mandate, as it was closed on September 9, 1883, with the restoration of the Tarnovo Constitution.

== Functions ==
The Statute of the State Council, promulgated by a decree of Prince Alexander of Battenberg in September 1881, was developed by Professor Marin Drinov and imposed with the assistance of the Russian Empire's Diplomatic Agent and Consul General, Mikhail Khitrovo. According to this document, the council prepares bills adopted by the National Assembly and decrees issued by the prince, controls the finances of local government, monitors compliance with basic laws, and acts as a supreme court in resolving administrative disputes.

== Composition ==
The State Council consisted of the following:

- four members appointed directly by the prince
- eight more appointed from among twenty candidates elected by the people.
- The ministers and a representative of the Orthodox Church had the right to vote in the Council.
