= Dimitar Agura =

Bulgarian historian and politician (1849–1911)

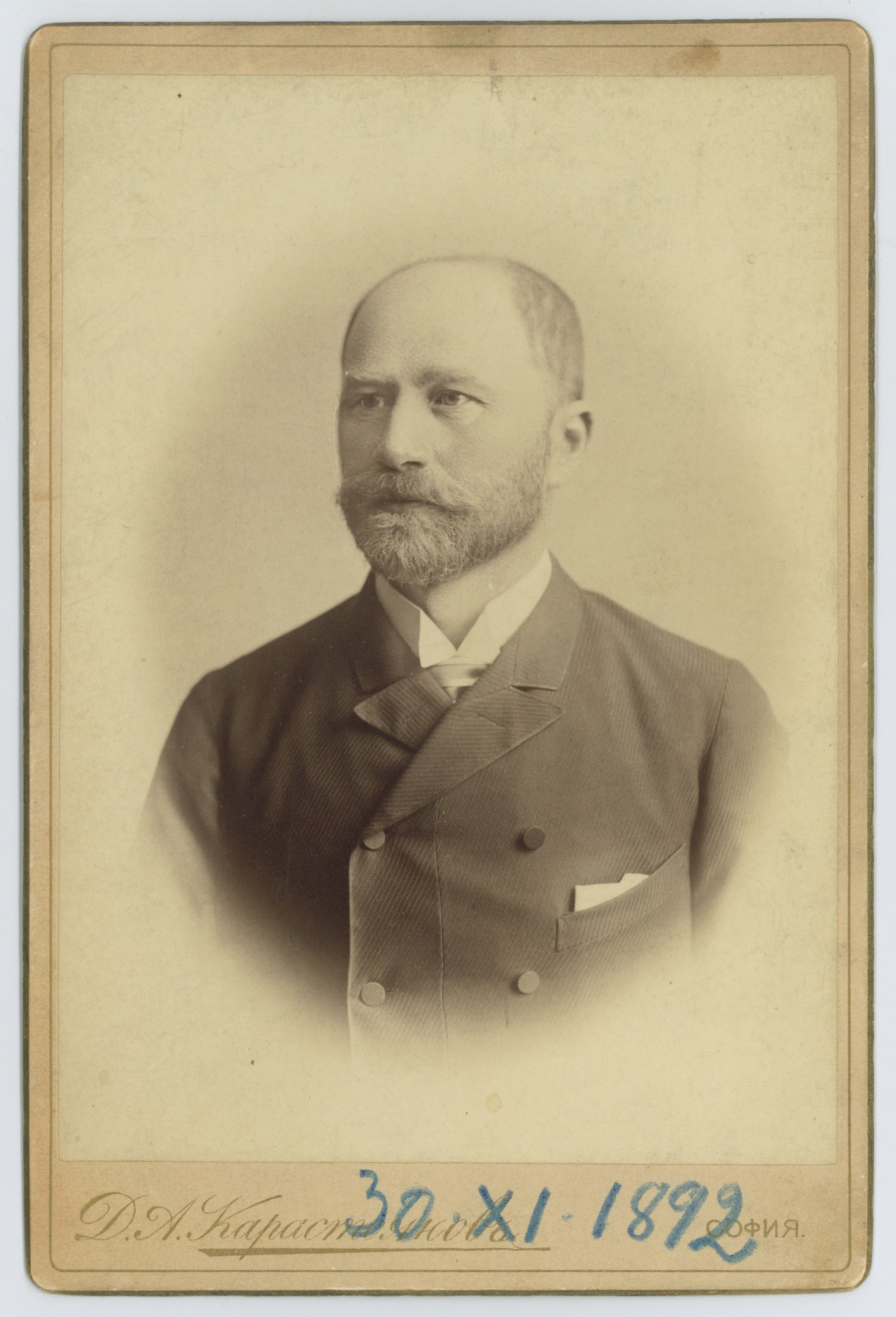
- Agura in November 1892
- Born: Dimitar Dimitrov Agura; 26 October 1849; Bolgrad or Chushmelia, Bessarabia Governorate, Russian Empire
- Died: 11 October 1911 (aged 61); Iași, Kingdom of Romania

Academic background
- Education: University of Iași
- Influences: Mykhailo Drahomanov; Victor Grigorovich; Johann Gottfried Herder; Titu Maiorescu; Ivan Shishmanov

Academic work
- School or tradition: Junimea
- Main interests: Historiography; Thracology; Slavic studies; ethnography; museology
- Influenced: Lyubomir Miletich

Dimitar Dimitrov Agura (Note: Also Romanized as Dimitur or Dimităr.) (Bulgarian: Димитър Димитров Агура; Russian: Дмитрий Дмитриевич Агура, romanized: Dmitriy Dmitriyevich Agura; Romanian: Demetrie or Dimitrie Agura, also Agură; 26 October 1849 – 11 October 1911) was a Bulgarian historian, one of the first professors of history at Sofia University and a rector of that same institution. He was born in the Russian Empire as a member of the Bessarabian Bulgarian diaspora; when southern Bessarabia was absorbed back into Moldavia in 1856, he became a Moldavian subject, and acquired fluency in Romanian. His immersion into Romanian culture was enhanced during the United Principalities period of the 1860s and 1870s: young Agura graduated from the Bulgarian School in Bolgrad, from the Socola Seminary in Iași, and finally from the University of Iași, also joining Junimea literary society. Working as a teacher and inspector in Romanian provincial schools, he befriended fellow Junimists such as Mihai Eminescu and Ion Creangă. As a result of a sudden illness, he returned to his alma mater in Bolgrad, and was still active there during the Liberation of Bulgaria in 1877–1878.

Agura ultimately decided to emigrate into the Principality of Bulgaria, joining its fledgling intellectual elite. He entered the Ministry of Interior as a career bureaucrat (1879), and for nine months of 1883 was Minister of Popular Enlightenment. He returned to his teaching profession—with stints as headmaster of gymnasiums in Plovdiv and Sofia—then became lecturer at the newly formed national university (1889). Though his courses there focused on general history and Ancient Rome, he was mainly interested in the Thracians and did work in the field of Slavic studies. With Lyubomir Miletich, he researched Romanian archives and produced a history of Church Slavonic in Romania; inspired by Ivan Shishman and the Sbornik group, they also published an overview of Bulgarian Romanian ethnography. Agura personally handled public relations for the university and the Bulgarian Academy of Sciences, becoming noted for his collaborations with international scholars—including Mykhailo Drahomanov (whose biography he penned in 1895), Bogdan Petriceicu Hasdeu, and Pavel Milyukov.

Drawn into the Macedonian Struggle from the position of a right-leaning Bulgarian nationalist, Agura had joined the Secret Macedonian-Adrianople Revolutionary Organization by 1903. He chaired a Charity Committee which sponsored the anti-Ottoman revolt, including with public monies obtained from Prime Minister Racho Petrov. Drawing into cooperation with left-wingers such as Yane Sandanski, he was for a while singled out as an enemy by Ivan Tsonchev's Supreme Macedonian-Adrianople Committee. Agura was additionally caught up in the conflict between Bulgarian academics and Knyaz Ferdinand I, who had him dismissed from the faculty in 1907. He was reintegrated in 1908, at a time when his Macedonian dealings were being formally investigated by the state. Rendered frail by an unspecified disease, he died while revisiting Iași for that university's 50th anniversary. The Romanian authorities granted him state honors and a lavish farewell ceremony at the Annunciation Church. His son, also named Dimitar, earned distinction as an engineer.

== Biography ==
=== Bessarabian and Romanian periods ===
Agura's paternal family originated from the Ottoman Empire's Silistra Eyalet, being first attested at Nevsha, outside Shumen, in the second half of the 18th century. They left the Ottoman during the massive exodus that followed the Russo–Turkish War of 1828–1829. Dimitar's ancestors chose to settle in the Russian Empire's Bessarabia Governorate, leading the community known as Ogurets (Russian for "cucumber"), with his father emerging as its administrator. The name was adapted into a nickname, and then a family name, becoming Agura; alternative etymologies suggest that it originates with the Ukrainian word ohurnyy ("stubborn").

Schoolteacher Petru Bârgăoanu, who met some members of this clan, reports that the scholar's father was a priest of the Russian Orthodox Church in Chushmelia (Cișmeaua-Văruită); Dimitrie's two paternal uncles were likewise men of the clergy—one had his parish in Ismail, the other in Dolichioi. The latter's son, and Dimitar's cousin, was Georgi Agura, future general of the Bulgarian Armed Forces. According to contemporary records, Dimitar himself was born in the urban center of Bolgrad, though later biographies have him as a native of Chushmelia. His birth date was given as 26 October 1849. As noted by scholar Elena Siupiur, Dimitar and his brother Vasil stand out as among the intellectuals of Bessarabian Bulgarian origin for having a peasant, rather than bourgeois, background. When Dimitar was seven years old, southern Bessarabia, including some of the Bulgarian colonies, was assigned to Moldavia, a Romanian-speaking vassal state of the Ottoman Empire. In 1859, Moldavia merged into the United Principalities, making young Agura into a Romanian subject. He started his education at Bolgrad's Bulgarian School, and, having been singled out for his talents, including his modesty and resilience, he was sent to a seminary in Ismail. He then graduated from a Socola Seminary in Iași, the Moldavian capital, where he studied alongside his cousin Georgi. Singled out for his academic success, he was once presented to Romania's Domnitor, Carol of Hohenzollern, who remained his personal friend.

The recipient of a scholarship, Dimitar Agura majored in history at the University of Iași, completing his education in 1872. In November 1870, he had joined colleagues such as Ioan Bădescu and N. Badenschi in establishing a Society of Students, where he was also lecturing on literary topics. He was probably the first Bessarabian Bulgarian to have graduated in a Romanian, rather than Russian, center of higher learning, and also stood out as a favorite student of Titu Maiorescu, the Romanian philosopher and literary critic. In February 1872, Agura presented himself in the competition for a professor's seat at Socola, but lost to Petre Râșcanu. He worked as a teacher in Botoșani (1873–1874), though some authors indicate his having had a similar position in Bârlad. He is known to have been employed for a while by the Pedagogic Institute of Iași.

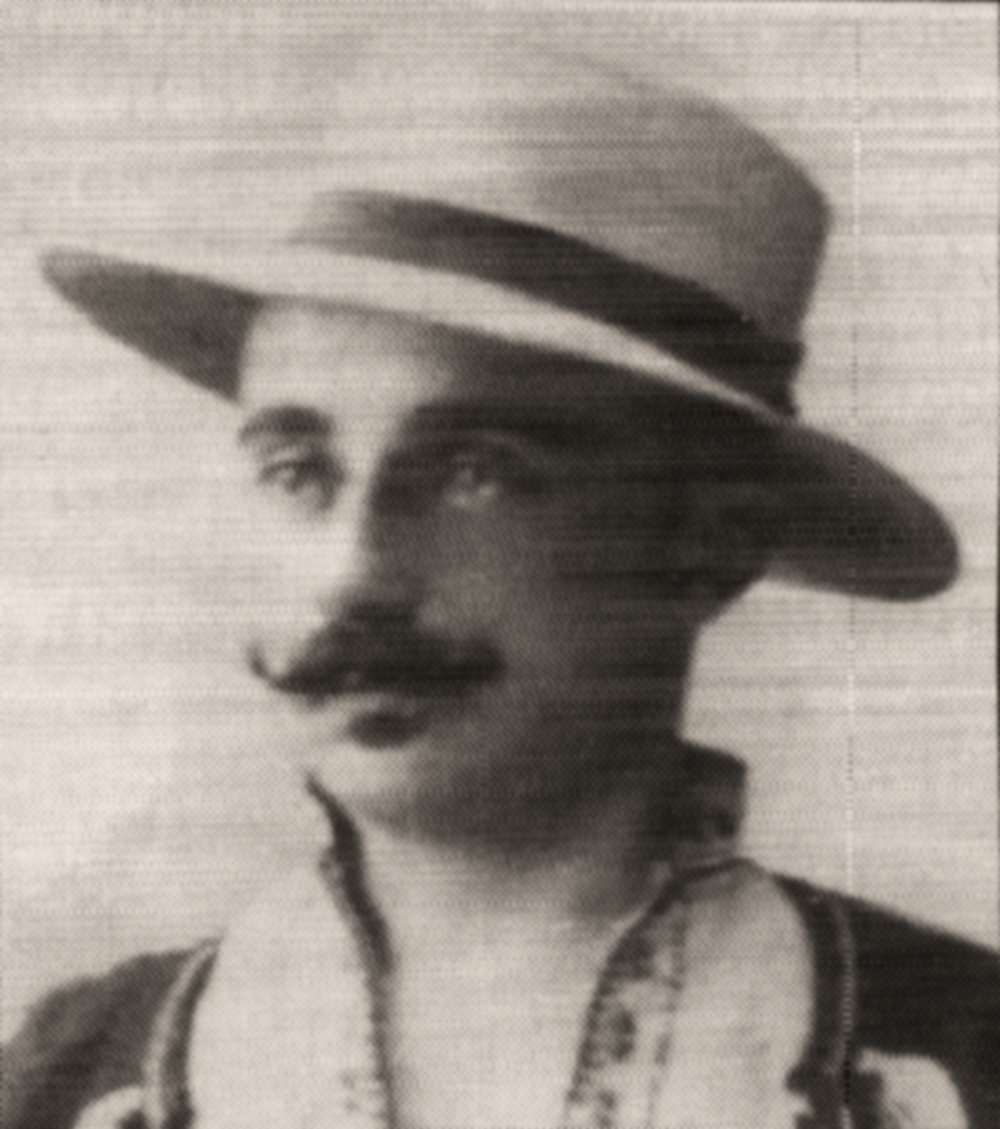
Agura in his youth

From 1874, Agura was a minor figure in Maiorescu's cultural and political club, Junimea. His friends there included raconteur Ion Creangă and poet Mihai Eminescu. He lived for a while in the former's home, the Bojdeuca, and left behind a cupboard, which Creangă continued to use to his death. In his memoirs, Maiorescu's associate Iacob Negruzzi conflates Dimitar and Georgi into a single figure, "Gheorghe Agură", arguing that he had been won over by Romanian nationalism, and that he was publicly asking for curbs on the Bulgarization of Bessarabian schools. He was afterwards a school inspector in Iași and Vaslui (1874–1875), before deciding to return to his native area due to an illness. Eminescu was his successor, from 1 July 1875.

According to Negruzzi, Agura also ended his association with Junimea exactly as Maiorescu lost his position as Minister of Public Instruction (1876). For several years, Agura taught Romanian language and Bulgarian history at his Bolgrad alma mater. In an undated letter to Eminescu, Creangă shows his mistaken belief that "Agură the accursed" had settled in the capital city of Bucharest, and that he was doing well for himself. Vasil, meanwhile, had completed his education at Ismail seminary (1867) and had been assigned priesthood in the Romanian Orthodox Church. While teaching at one of Bolgrad's primary schools, he joined the Bulgarian National Revival, leading a branch of the Revolutionary Committee in Chushmelia.

=== Bulgarian career ===
With the Liberation of Bulgaria in 1878, most Aguras moved into the newly established Principality of Bulgaria. Dimitar took with him a sizable book collection, which remains one of Bulgaria's first. He settled with it in Plovdiv, before transferring to Sofia. He worked as a head of department at the Ministry of Interior (1879–1881), rising to the position of secretary general (1881–1883). He was an interim Minister of Popular Enlightenment in Leonid Sobolev's caretaker cabinet (3 March 1883). In the newly formed Kingdom of Romania, he was not immediately identified as the former Romanian professor. When this was revealed by the press, the citizens of Botoșani sent him congratulatory telegrams. His appointment came at a time when the ruling Knyaz, Alexander of Battenberg, had embarked on a diplomatic conflict with Russia, but was trying to contain it. Agura was thus one of only two ministers who did not hold Russian citizenship—though the press still commented on his having been a Russian subject, and his audibly poor grasp of Bulgarian.

Battenberg resented his ministers, and hoped to have them deposed in favor of a coalition between Johan Ehrnrooth and the Conservative Party. As a result, Sobolev conspired against the Knyaz, and was replaced in September with Dragan Tsankov, with Dimitar Mollov announced as the new Minister of Popular Enlightenment. Upon ending his ministerial stint on 7 November 1883, Agura was a headmaster, returning as such to lead a new gymnasium in Plovdiv. He was serving there on Unification Day 1885, when he joined in the spontaneous celebrations—proposing that his school be renamed Aleksandrovska, after Battenberg. He was also for a while the principal of State Men's Gymnasium No 1 in Sofia, known to the visiting scholar Anton Bezenšek as a Realgymnasium. Bezenšek describes Agura as "experienced in pedagogy and a proven schoolmaster", having found that the collections were "perfect order." He returned to Romania in 1887, alongside his colleague Lyubomir Miletich. Upon completing their study trip, they published an overview of Church Slavonic in Romania. It remains noted for controversially proposed that that language, which the Romanians had used for history-writing and then relegated to liturgical service, was a dialect of Bulgarian. This Romanian-themed work was held by historian Nicolae Iorga as an homage by Agura to the country in which "he had spent his best and most luminous years".

Sofia University was founded in October 1888, and Agura became its lecturer exactly one year later, originally with optional lectures that covered Ancient Rome. He also taught another course which, from 1894, was known as "General History", but he had a diversity of interests, focusing primarily on the Thracians and Dacians. The immigrant scholar was Sofia's first habilitated professor. He also served as rector, the second one after fellow Bessarabian Bulgarian Aleksandar Teodorov-Balan; he held that distinction three times (1889–1890, 1892–1895, 1908). As he explained in 1893, the institution was treated with hostility and "natural doubts" by the mass of the population, and it fell on him to work around such problems. Visibly inspired by Johann Gottfried Herder (his intellectual debt is described by historian Aleksandr Kiseyev), he argued that science was not "cosmopolitan", but rather national—a "manifestation of the social organism, like any other cultural phenomenon inherent in humanity", and "a symbol of the civilization of our nation". Additionally, Agura aimed for the expansion of the university's initial goals:

With the opening of the first two departments, the first goal was achieved—namely, the preparation of capable teachers for secondary schools. But it is not only in the department of education that the state needs capable employees; there is a great need for such employees in other departments, especially in the judiciary and administration, which are of no less importance for the smooth running of the state machine.

Agura was also author of the national textbook of history, which had been reprinted fourteen times by 1989. In 1890 or 1892, he produced a monograph of modern history, with a particular focus on the French Revolution. Largely compiled from notes kept by the deceased Russian scholar, Victor Grigorovich, it remains "the first scientific analysis of the French Revolution in Bulgarian." In September 1892, having earned financial backing from Minister Georgi Zhivkov, Agura and Miletich traveled to Bucharest, and also to Iași, doing complex research into Romanian documentary funds. They were for a while guests of fellow historian Bogdan Petriceicu Hasdeu, who granted them access to the National Archives. They had brought with them issues of Ivan Shishmanov's Sbornik za Narodni Umotvoreniia i Narodopis, which were avidly read by Romanian scholars in those fields. It is through their intervention that Hasdeu and Shishmanov became friends. Shishmanov also tasked the two traveling scholars with researching the Bulgarian communities of Romania. As a result, Agura and Miletich produced an ethnographic record of these groups, published by Sbornik in 1893. Agura was also a founder of the academic journal Balgarski Pregled, which featured his critical summaries of Romanian historical literature.

In addition to networking with the Romanians, Agura was interested in welcoming Russian scholars who had criticized Tsarist autocracy and had been forced to leave their country. He and Shishman worked closely with Mykhailo Drahomanov, who was spending his final years in Sofia; Agura once asked Drahomanov to assist him with pointers on the history of Ancient Rome, but could not use the advice: "It turned out that he did not know German and could not read new German publications, and he did not know the French authors named by M. Dra[h]omanov." In 1895, Agura and Drahomanov established the "Bulgarian Fatherland Fund", which collected money for the creation of a Bulgarian encyclopedia—its early sponsors included the country's new Knyaz, Ferdinand I. From July 1895, after Drahomanov had died, he decided to translate and publish one Drahomanov's final articles, which Shishmanov had regarded as too anti-clerical. That year, Balgarski Pregled hosted Agura's biography of his deceased colleague. The first such piece to be published in the country, it featured several political hints, including when it came to Drahomanov's support for Ukrainian nationalism (but omitting virtually all mention of Drahomanov's life in Bulgaria). In 1897, Agura welcomed exiled historian Pavel Milyukov, the emerging doyen of Russian liberalism, at the Sofia faculty, where they shared the department of General History. As the new arrival recalled, Agura was "an older breed of teacher, from when there was no higher school in Bulgaria. He treated me with the utmost consideration and kindness; there was not a trace of any jealousy in his attitude towards me; we also got to know his nice family." They became friends, with Agura being the first to warn Milyukov that the Russian authorities wanted him to stop lecturing.

Agura was one of the scientists who obtained that the Bulgarian state purchase Drahomanov's book collection, with the "very large" sum of 10,000 leva being sent to his widow, Lyudmyla Drahomanova. In 1900, he became an acting member of the Bulgarian Academy of Sciences. In 1901, he was among the founders of the Bulgarian Historical Society; he remained its chairman until his death. He was also included on a fundraising committee that helped erect Sofia's Monument to the Tsar Liberator. His still-avid interest in Romanian affairs also extended to music, including by cultivating composer Gavril Muzicescu and pianist Aurelia Kitzu Arimondi. In April 1904, General Agura publicly congratulated Muzicescu, including on behalf of "my cousin Dimitrie Agura", for his "Hymn of the Cherubs", which had just been performed in Sofia. Dimitar was involved, alongside Shishmanov, in the campaign to replace Shumi Maritsa as the Bulgarian national anthem, and asked Muzicescu to submit one of his own songs for review.

=== SMARO engagement and final years ===
Still marginally engaged in politics, Dimitar Agura expressed his support for the Secret Macedonian-Adrianople Revolutionary Organization (SMARO), which was shaping the movement against the Ottomans in areas bordering Bulgaria. In June 1903, just ahead of an anti-Ottoman revolt, Agura and Miletich publicly endorsed the Macedonian Bulgarian wing of SMARO and its leader Hristo Chervenivanov, also criticizing its rivals within Ivan Tsonchev's Supreme Committee. In August, while the revolt was in full swing, Agura appeared at a rally in Sofia alongside Toma Karayovov, calling for the creation of Bulgarian revolutionary support networks. Also then, he was elected chairman of the Charity Committee for Assisting the Suffering Macedonians, and, as he reported in conversation with Grigor Nachovich, collected some 900,000 leva in support of various revolutionary groups. His office, which exposed massacres committed by the Ottoman Army around Nakolec, sent a delegation, headed by Miletich, on a tour of European capitals, in hopes of channeling anti-Ottoman sentiment.

According to historian D. V. Mykolenko, Agura actually joined the SMARO, and represented its right-wing section, alongside Hristo Matov and Hristo Tatarchev. That political faction allowed the Bulgarian government of Racho Petrov to ban private charities from assisting the rebels, favoring instead SMARO's direct and secretive cooperation with the Bulgarian state authorities. As a result, in October 1904 the Charity Committee received almost 41,000 leva from Petrov, which Agura immediately transferred to Matov and Tatarchev; ahead of Christmas 1904, he managed to obtain an additional 15,000 leva from the government, "handed over against a receipt to Matov and Tatarchev." Tsonchev's newspaper, Reformi, took a dim view of these activities, reporting that Agura was arming Yane Sandanski, and as such the most "bloodthirsty" and "illiterate", as well as least Bulgarophile, cadres of the SMARO. Agura continued to endorse Sandanski after a unifying congress held at Rila Monastery in autumn 1905. In December of that year, he attended a conference that established the "Charitable Union" as a front of the SMARO. The new venture also accepted pledges from Tsonchev's delegates, from the Broad Socialists, and from the Macedonian-Adrianople Social Democratic Group.

Agura was becoming known to his new liege, Ferdinand I, as having "the eyes, gaze and head of a cat" (according to journalist Dobri Ganchev, such statements evidenced the Knyaz's "great ability to grasp even the smallest, but characteristic features in people"). In early 1904, he had been sent by Ferdinand on another trip to Bucharest, where he collected items related to the Russo–Romanian–Turkish War of 1877; this mission reunited him with Carol, who was by then the King of Romania. Around then, he began designing a Siege of Plevna memorial museum, in collaboration with Anton Mitov, Ivan Mrkvička, Stoyan Zaimov, and Captain P. Genchev. The Ministry of Popular Enlightenment sponsored his subsequent journey to France, where he studied the organizational model of the École Nationale des Chartes, and recommended that it be adopted by the Bulgarian Historical Archive.

Agura, Shishmanov and Miletich, alongside Vasil Zlatarski, were delegates of the university at Marin Drinov's funeral in Kharkov (February 1907). All four scholars were granted honorary doctorates by the Imperial Kharkov University. They were forced into retirement by Ferdinand following the university's temporary closure in May of that year, with Agura receiving an pension of 4,000 leva annually. The group of banished scholars was also assisted sponsored by a "Professors' Fund", with money collected from regular Bulgarian donors. By January 1908, Agura had been reinstated at Sofia, and had begun his final mandate as rector—his colleague Miletich had received most votes, but withdrew upon the death of his son. That same month, the Democratic Party had come to power, and had ordered an investigation of the SMARO. During its proceedings, it emerged that Agura had provided "detailed accounts" regarding his use of public funds, but that his partners in the SMARO had been involved in embezzlement. Around 1910, he was seen as an associate of the People's Party, and attacked as such by political journalist Trifon Kunev—who once included Agura, Shismanov and Miletich in a category of "ignorant, salaried cattle" in service to the unpatriotic Populists.

Agura died on 11 October 1911; he was at Iași, where he was attending the local university's 50th anniversary celebrations as a Sofia faculty delegate. Negruzzi, who records the date in its Old Style variant, as "28 September", also notes that it came two days after he had spoken in front of his colleagues (still impressing them with his command of Romanian and his message of international cooperation). According to Iorga, he was visibly suffering; his only activity after ending his speech was to shake hands with Carol. While Siupiur suggests that he fell down in the actual hall where the celebration was held, he was in fact found unresponsive in the Strătilescu home on Muzelor Street, where he had been lodging. This was reportedly the same address he had used during his youth. The event arose some suspicions, and a prosecutor was called in to investigate. The local daily Opinia discussed Agura's being afflicted by a "deadly disease", and commented that his great love for Iași had offered him some consolation.

== Legacy ==
A vigil was held at the Annunciation Church, with military honors delivered by the Ștefan cel Mare Regiment of the Romanian Land Forces. This function was attended by the Moldavian Metropolitan, Pimen Georgescu, and an assembly of priests, as well as by several of Agura's colleagues from Sofia (including Miletich) and by 30 Romanian academics (led by Ioan Bogdan). A large crowd of Romanians joined the procession which accompanied the body on the first leg of its transportation back into the Kingdom of Bulgaria. Still in October 1911, Agura was inducted as a Commander in the Order of the Star of Romania, with a decree signed by King Carol while, unbeknown to him, the recipient was dying.

In an obituary piece, Iorga observed that Agura's visit and death had come just as Bulgaria–Romania relations were degenerating into enmity. In that context, Miletich spoke at the vigil in a friendly but restrained manner. However, Iorga also noted having held no hostility toward the deceased himself, whom he regarded as an "old and beloved acquaintance". His arrival at Iași, had been especially moving, since he was already decrepit and "brought down by disease", paying an homage that Romanians themselves tended to abstain from. Iorga also observed that Agura's casket was draped in the Romanian tricolor, arguing that this was perhaps the last instance for the colors to appear in Bulgaria without their being carried there by a "conquering army." His wife Anastasia, whom he had married in Bulgaria, wrote a thankful letter to Romanian journalists. It read: "The sympathies offered by the Romanian press have been like a sweet caress for me and my children, in these moments of despair."

Dimitar Agura's likeness was preserved in a portrait by Dimitar Karastoyanov, where he is shown wearing a Shopluk costume. General Agura was sent to Bucharest soon after his cousin's death, in November 1912, to commemorate the Siege of Plevna and Carol's role in it—his participation was a downgrade from the state visit initially planned by Prince Kiril. In mid-1913, Bulgaria and Romania faced each other in the Second Balkan War. They were again on opposite sides during World War I, which also witnessed the union of Bessarabia with Romania. Dimitar's surviving brother Vasil joined in the unification process as a representative of pro-Romanian, well-off Bulgarians. Still "fluent in Romanian", he represented Kitai on a regional committee which collaborated with the Romanian troops entering southern Bessarabia. His brother the scholar had fathered three children, including engineer Dimitar Agura Jr, famous for introducing reinforced concrete to Bulgaria during the interwar period. Dimitar's other offspring were daughters Nedyalka and Elena, with the former noted as one of Bulgaria's first female pianists.

Dimitar Jr was persecuted by the Fatherland Front, which came to power following the coup of September 1944, and then also by the People's Republic of Bulgaria. He and his family were internally displaced to Tutrakan, but sent back following the intervention of a Soviet engineer. His three sons were all locally famous. The eldest, who also took the name Dimitar, was part of an architects' team that designed the World Trade Center. His younger brother, Atanas (1926–2008), engaged in anti-communist politics, and spent part of his youth as a deportee in the labor camps. He was allowed to resume his studies, and graduated with honors in 1956; he then earned distinction as an architect and urban planner affiliated with Sofia's Glavproekt and Softproekt institutes. He worked on designing the National Palace of Culture and renovating Vitosha Boulevard. Engineering was also pursued by the third-born, Konstantin Agura, whose main work was in engine manufacturing. The youngest two Aguras were also racing enthusiasts, and officially recognized as Masters of Sport by the people's republic.
