= List of Bulgarian finance ministers =

This page lists Bulgarian finance ministers.

== List (1990–) ==
Minister	Party	Prime minister	Term start	Term end
Ivan Kostov (Иван Костов)	Union of Democratic Forces	Dimitar Iliev Popov, Philip Dimitrov	20 December 1990	30 December 1992
Stoyan Alexandrov (Стоян Александров)	Independent	Lyuben Berov	30 December 1992	17 October 1994
Christina Vucheva (Христина Вучева)	Independent	Reneta Indzhova	17 October 1994	25 January 1995
Dimitar Kostov (Димитър Костов)	Bulgarian Socialist Party	Zhan Videnov	25 January 1995	12 February 1997
Svetoslav Gavriyski (Светослав Гаврийски)	Independent	Stefan Sofiyanski	12 February 1997	21 May 1997
Muravey Radev (Муравей Радев)	Union of Democratic Forces	Ivan Kostov	21 May 1997	24 July 2001
Milen Veltchev (Милен Велчев)	National Movement for Stability and Progress	Simeon Sakskoburggotski	24 July 2001	17 August 2005
Plamen Oresharski (Пламен Орешарски)	Independent	Sergei Stanishev	17 August 2005	27 July 2009
Simeon Dyankov (Симеон Дянков)	GERB	Boyko Borissov	27 July 2009	13 March 2013
Kalin Hristov (Калин Христов)	Independent	Marin Raykov	13 March 2013	29 May 2013
Petar Chobanov (Петър Чобанов)	Bulgarian Socialist Party	Plamen Oresharski	29 May 2013	6 August 2014
Rumen Porodzanov (Румен Порожанов)	Independent	Georgi Bliznashki	6 August 2014	7 November 2014
Vladislav Goranov (Владислав Горанов)	GERB	Boyko Borissov	7 November 2014	27 January 2017
Kiril Ananiev (Кирил Ананиев)	Independent	Ognyan Gerdzhikov	27 January 2017	4 May 2017
Vladislav Goranov (Владислав Горанов)	GERB	Boyko Borissov	4 May 2017	24 July 2020
Kiril Ananiev (Кирил Ананиев)	GERB	Boyko Borissov	24 July 2020	11 May 2021
Assen Vassilev (Асен Василев)	Independent	Stefan Yanev	11 May 2021	15 September 2021
Valery Beltchev (Валери Белчев)	Independent	Stefan Yanev	15 September 2021	13 December 2021
Assen Vassilev (Асен Василев)	PP	Kiril Petkov	13 December 2021	2 August 2022
Rositsa Velkova-Zheleva (Росица Велкова-Желева)	Independent	Galab Donev	2 August 2022	6 June 2023
Assen Vassilev (Асен Василев)	PP–DB	Nikolai Denkov	6 June 2023	9 April 2024
Lyudmila Petkova	Independent	Dimitar Glavchev	9 April 2024	16 January 2025
Temenuzhka Petkova	GERB–SDS	Rossen Zhelyazkov	16 January 2025	Incumbent

== Before 1990 ==
=== Principality of Bulgaria since 28 April 1879 ===
- Grigor Nachovich
- Petko Karavelov
- Georgi Scheljaskovitsch
- Grigor Nachovich
- Leonid Sobolev
- Todor Burmov
- Grigor Nachovich
- Michail Sarafov
- Petko Karavelov
- Todor Burmov
- Ivan Evstratiev Geshov
- Grigor Nachovich
- Ivan Evstratiev Geshov
- Vasil Radoslavov
- Konstantin Stoilov
- Grigor Nachovich
- Ivan Salabaschev
- Georgi Schivkov
- Christo Beltschev
- Grigor Nachovich
- Ivan Salabaschev
- Ivan Evstratiev Geshov
- Teodor Teodorov
- Michail Tenev
- Todor Ivanchov
- Christo Bontschev
- Petko Karavelov
- Michail Sarafov
- Anton Manouschev
- Lasar Pajakov
- Ivan Salabaschev (29 January 1908 – 18 September 1910)

=== Kingdom of Bulgaria since 22 September 1908 ===
- Ivan Salabashev (29 January 1908 – 18 September 1910)
- Andrey Lyapchev
- Dimitar Tonchev
- Stoyan Danev
- Rayko Daskalov
- Marko Tourlakov
- Petar Janev
- Petar Todorov
- Vladimir Mollov
- Alexander Guirguinov
- Stefan Stefanov
- Michail Kalendarov
- Marko Rjaskov
- Stoicho Moushanov
- Kiril Gunev
- Dobri Bozhilov
- Dimitar Savov
- Petko Stojanov
- Stancho Cholakov

=== People's Republic of Bulgaria since 15 September 1946 ===
- Ivan Stefanov (31 March 1946 - 6 August 1949)
- Petko Kunin (6 August 1949- 8 October 1949)
- Kiril Lasarov (8 October 1949 - 27 November 1962)
- Dimitar Petrov Popov (27 November 1962 - 17 June 1976)
- Beltscho Belchev (17 June 1976 - 20 December 1990)
