= Todor Burmov =

Prime Minister of Bulgaria (1834–1906)

- Тодор Бурмов
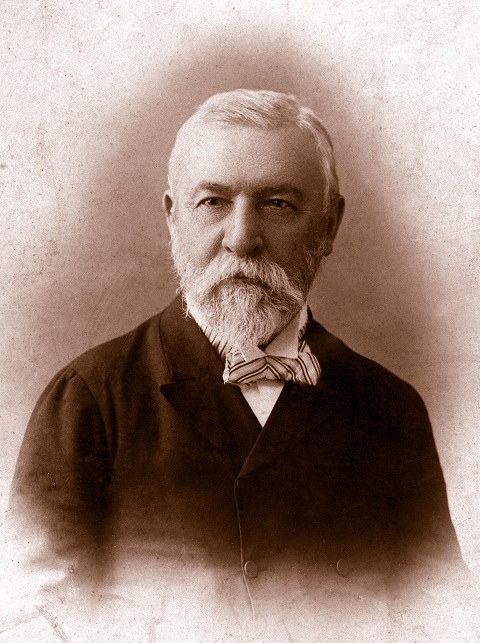

1st Prime Minister of Bulgaria
- In office 17 July 1879 – 6 December 1879
- Monarch: Alexander
- Preceded by: Office established
- Succeeded by: Vasil Drumev

Minister of Interior
- In office 17 July 1879 – 6 December 1879
- Premier: Himself
- Preceded by: Office established
- Succeeded by: Dimitar Grekov

Minister of Education
- In office 17 July 1879 – 7 August 1879
- Premier: Himself
- Preceded by: Office established
- Succeeded by: Georgi Atanasovich

Minister of Finance
- In office 18 March 1883 – 19 September 1883
- Premier: Leonid Sobolev
- Preceded by: Leonid Sobolev
- Succeeded by: Grigor Nachovich
- In office 21 August 1886 – 24 August 1886
- Premier: Vasil Drumev
- Preceded by: Petko Karavelov
- Succeeded by: Ivan Geshov

Personal details
- Born: 14 January 1834 Gabrovo Province, Ottoman Empire
- Died: 7 November 1906 (aged 72) Sofia, Bulgaria
- Party: Conservative Party (until 1885); Progressive Liberal Party (1885–1906)
- Education: Imperial Moscow University

Todor Stoyanov Burmov (Bulgarian: Тодор Стоянов Бурмов; 14 January 1834 – 7 November 1906) was a leading Bulgarian Conservative Party politician and the first Prime Minister of an independent Bulgaria.

Burmov was a graduate of the Kiev Theological Academy and subsequently worked as a teacher in Gabrovo and newspaper editor. During the period of Ottoman rule Burmov, along with Gavril Krastevich, came to attention as part of a moderate faction that sought an independent Bulgarian Orthodox Church that would remain linked to the Ecumenical Patriarchate of Constantinople in opposition to more hardline nationalists who advocated a complete schism.

Burmov was a close associate of Alexander of Bulgaria and so was chosen as the Prime Minister of the newly independent country on 17 July 1879 despite the relatively weak position of the Conservatives. Burmov's regime was mostly involved in trying to stabilize the new country, including placing Varna and other areas of Muslim insurgency under martial law. The government largely proved a failure due to the lack of support for the Conservatives in the Assembly and it fell that same year.

Burmov remained a leading political figure after his spell as Prime Minister, serving as Finance Minister in the government of Leonid Sobolev and the second regime of Archbishop Kliment Turnovski. Returning to journalism, Burmov would later leave the Conservatives and become a member of Dragan Tsankov's Progressive Liberal Party.

Political offices
Preceded by office established	Prime Minister of Bulgaria; 1879	Succeeded by Vasil Drumev
Preceded by office established	Minister of Interior; 1879	Succeeded by Dimitar Grekov
Preceded by office established	Minister of Education; 1879	Succeeded by Georgi Atanasovich
Preceded by Leonid Sobolev	Minister of Finance; 1883	Succeeded by Leonid Sobolev
Preceded by Vasil Drumev	Minister of Finance; 1886	Succeeded by Petko Karavelov
