= Kliment of Tarnovo =

Bulgarian clergyman and politician (1841–1901)

Kliment Turnovski
- Климент Търновски
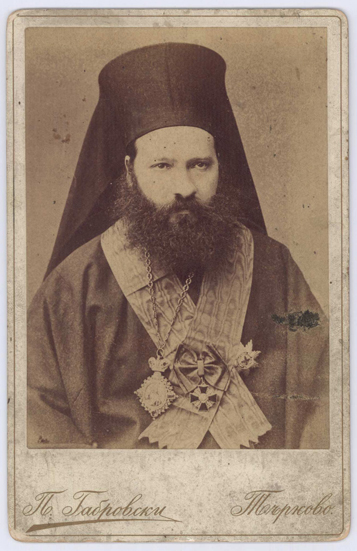
- Turnovski in 1887

2nd Prime Minister of Bulgaria
- In office 6 December 1879 – 7 April 1880
- Monarch: Alexander
- Preceded by: Todor Burmov
- Succeeded by: Dragan Tsankov
- In office 21 August 1886 – 24 August 1886
- Monarch: Alexander
- Preceded by: Petko Karavelov
- Succeeded by: Petko Karavelov

Minister of Education
- In office 6 December 1879 – 7 April 1880
- Premier: Himself
- Preceded by: Georgi Atanasovich
- Succeeded by: Ivan Gyuzelev

Personal details
- Born: 1841; Shumen, Ottoman Empire
- Died: 10 July 1901 (aged 59-60); Sofia, Bulgaria
- Political party: Conservative Party

Kliment of Tarnovo (born Vasil Nikolov Drumev, Bulgarian: Васил Николов Друмев; c. 1841 – 10 July 1901, known by his title as Metropolitan Kliment of Turnovo), was a leading Bulgarian clergyman and politician. He was also a writer and one of the founders of the Bulgarian Literature Society (BLS; now known as the Bulgarian Academy of Sciences) in 1869.

== Education ==
He was born in Shumen (where a village now bears his given name) into a craftsman family. Originally, he was taught in his native town by Sava Dobroplodni and Sava Filaretov, but afterwards attended the Odessa Seminary. He was influenced by the revolutionary Georgi Sava Rakovski and joined Rakovski's First Bulgarian Legion in Belgrade in 1861, where he distinguished himself in the fight against the Turkish garrison. Drumev kept close ties with Vasil Levski, Stefan Karadzha and some other Bulgarian revolutionaries.

After the Legion disbanded in 1862, Kliment emigrated to Russia, where he continued his education at the Kiev seminary. In 1869 he settled in Brăila. In 1873 he was ordained a priest, and in the ensuing year he was ordained a bishop under the name Kliment Branitski. He later became deputy of the metropolitan bishop in Tulcha.

After the Liberation of Bulgaria in 1878, Drumev worked as rector of the Peter-Paul seminary near Lyaskovets. In 1884 he was chosen to be metropolitan bishop of Turnovo.

== Government career ==
Drumev also took part in the socio-political life in the Principality - he was a deputy in the Constituent assembly in 1879 and in the First Grand National Assembly that year. Drumev was a supporter of Russia and opposed openly the foreign policy of the Regency (1886–1887), the first Stefan Stambolov regime (1887–1894) and Prince Ferdinand's regime, which led to repressive measures against him.

Although a fairly reluctant political figure, in 1879 Kliment agreed to become Prime Minister on a caretaker basis until elections could be held to fill the vacancy following the collapse of the government of Todor Burmov. Kliment government was largely inactive, serving only to continue the policies of Burmov until a successor could be appointed. He served a very brief second term in 1886 after the 9 August coup d'état in an attempt to co-ordinate opposition to the enforced abdication of Alexander of Bulgaria, although before long Stefan Stambolov and Petko Karavelov had taken over. Indeed, Turnovski's involvement in the plot even led to Stambolov declaring him an outlaw briefly.

A loyal supporter of the old monarchy, Kliment refused to celebrate the arrival of the new monarch Ferdinand I of Bulgaria, and refused to lead prayers for his arrival in Sofia. Stambolov moved against Kliment and expelled him from Sofia, whilst depriving him of much of his power. A strong supporter of Russia, he remained a harsh critic of the new King, although ultimately even his own flock turned against him and he was detained by the government. He was eventually released and publicly made peace with Ferdinand.

With Russia trusting Kliment, in summer 1895 he headed the Bulgarian parliamentary delegation in Saint Petersburg which had to reconcile Bulgaria with Russia, which terminated their official relations in November 1886. His mission was successful. But when he saw that Ferdinand was still not changing his attitude towards Russia, Kliment regretted his actions, because they helped Ferdinand to be recognized as the legal Bulgarian monarch.

== Writer ==
As a writer, Kliment was the father of Bulgarian fiction. He wrote the first original short story in Bulgarian, A Woeful Family (1860). Some of his important works include Student and benefactors or what is another's is another's (1864) and the drama Ivanko, the killer of Asen I (1872).

Political offices
Preceded by Todor Burmov	Prime Minister of Bulgaria; 1879-1880	Succeeded by Dragan Tsankov
Preceded by Petko Karavelov	Prime Minister of Bulgaria; 1886	Succeeded by Petko Karavelov
Preceded by Georgi Atanasovich	Minister of Education; 1879-1880	Succeeded by Ivan Gyuzelev
