= Georgi Valkovich =

Bulgarian physician, diplomat and politician

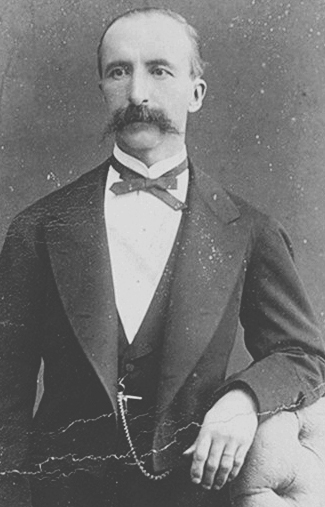
- Born: 1833; Adrianople, Ottoman Empire
- Died: February 26, 1892 (aged 58–59); Constantinople

Georgi Valkovich Cholakov (Bulgarian: Георги Вълкович Чолаков) (1833 – 26 February [O.S. 14 February] 1892) was a Bulgarian physician, diplomat and conservative politician. Among the leading surgeons in the Ottoman Empire, Valkovich became one of the leaders of the Conservative Party after the independence of Bulgaria in 1878. During Stefan Stambolov's government (1887–1894), he was a Bulgarian diplomatic deputy in Istanbul, where he was murdered on the orders of Naum Tyufekchiev.

== Biography ==
Georgi Valkovich was born in the Ottoman city of Adrianople in Eastern Thrace (today Edirne in Turkey, known in Bulgarian as Одрин, Odrin). His father was a member of the influential and affluent Cholakov family from Koprivshtitsa. Valkovich began his education in Plovdiv and graduated from the Academy of Military Medicine in Constantinople in 1857. After his graduation, he worked as a surgeon and as a reader at the Academy of Military Medicine in the imperial capital. Between 1860 and 1863, Valkovich resided in Paris, France as a post-graduate medical student. In 1865, he was briefly the chief physician of the Damascus Central Hospital. In 1870–1871, Valkovich headed the Haydarpaşa Hospital in Constantinople and by 1872, he was promoted to colonel in the Ottoman Army. In 1875, he joined the Bulgarian Literary Society (today Bulgarian Academy of Sciences) as an associate member; his full membership was provided in 1884.

After the Liberation of Bulgaria in 1878, Georgi Valkovich became an influential figure in Bulgarian politics. Among the leading members of the Conservative Party, Valkovich was elected to parliament in the Constituent Assembly of 1879, the 1st Grand National Assembly of 1879, and the 3rd National Assembly of 1882–1883. In 1879, he was appointed Director of Agriculture, Commerce and Public Buildings; in 1881, he was in charge of Eastern Rumelia's Department of Posts and Telegraphs. During Alexander of Battenberg's Regime of Proxies (1881–1883) Valkovich was Minister of Foreign Affairs and Religious Denominations (1881–1883) and chairman of the State Council (1883).

During the Serbo-Bulgarian War of 1885, Valkovich was in charge of all Bulgarian military hospitals. In 1886, he was appointed director of the Aleksandrovska Hospital. A year later, he was sent to Constantinople as the diplomatic deputy of the Principality of Bulgaria in the Ottoman Empire, a position he held until his death. At the time, that was the most important diplomatic position from a Bulgarian point of view, as Bulgaria was still de jure an Ottoman vassal, and it was reserved for experienced politicians. Valkovich was among the originators of Stefan Stambolov's active diplomatic policy aimed at improving the treatment of the remaining Bulgarian population in the empire.

Georgi Valkovich was assassinated on 26 February [O.S. 14 February] 1892 by opponents of Stambolov's government. The assassination was carried out by Dimitar Orlovski and Drazhev, Bulgarian Russophile emigrants who were unapproving of Stambolov's pro-Western and anti-Russian alignment. The Russian government was aware of the planned attempt, although it intentionally notified neither the Ottoman nor the Bulgarian officials. On 12 February Orlovski and Drazhev, dressed in carnival costumes, ambushed Valkovich in the vicinity of the Bulgarian Consulate in Constantinople during the Zagovezni Carnival celebrations before Lent. While Drazhev stayed behind to protect the assassin, Orlovski stabbed Valkovich in the stomach. The two perpetrators managed to run away in the crowd. Valkovich died of the wound two days later, and was interred in Plovdiv.

In his book The Builders of Modern Bulgaria, writer, diplomat and politician Simeon Radev describes Valkovich as follows: "elegant, witty and amusement-loving, he was a perfect social figure; extraordinarily perspicacious, he was also not devoid of slyness".

Political offices
Preceded by Konstantin Stoilov	Minister of Foreign Affairs of Bulgaria; 1881–1883	Succeeded by Konstantin Stoilov
