= Dimitar Grekov =

Bulgarian politician (1847–1901)

- Димитър Греков
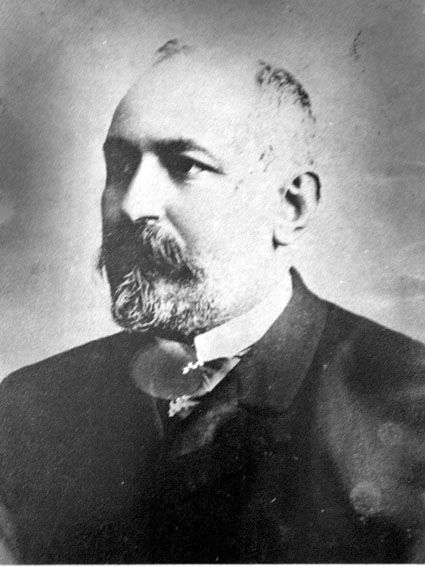

10th Prime Minister of Bulgaria
- In office 30 January 1899 – 13 October 1899
- Monarch: Ferdinand
- Preceded by: Konstantin Stoilov
- Succeeded by: Todor Ivanchov

Minister of Foreign Affairs
- In office 14 November 1890 – 31 May 1894
- Preceded by: Stefan Stambolov
- Succeeded by: Grigor Nachovich

Minister of Justice
- In office 5 July 1879 – 26 March 1880
- Preceded by: office established
- Succeeded by: Hristo Stoyanov
- In office 23 June 1882 – 3 March 1883
- Preceded by: Georgi Teoharov
- Succeeded by: Georgi Teoharov

Personal details
- Born: 14 September 1847 Bolhrad, Russian Empire
- Died: 7 May 1901 (aged 53) Sofia, Bulgaria
- Party: People's Liberal Party
- Occupation: Judicial Officer, Politician

Dimitar Panayotov Grekov (Bulgarian: Димитър Панайотов Греков) (14 September 1847 – 7 May 1901) was a leading Bulgarian liberal politician who also served as Prime Minister.

A native of Bolgrad in Bessarabia (now Bolhrad, Ukraine), Grekov was educated at a French legal school.

Grekov, at the time a Conservative, was a member of the Bulgarian Constitutional Assembly convened in February 1879, a body that formed the basis of the national parliament of the newly independent state. In the 1879 cabinet of Todor Burmov he served as Minister of Justice, the first of an independent Bulgaria.

In 1886 prime minister and regent Stefan Stambolov chose Grekov, along with Konstantin Kanchev and Konstantin Stoilov, to travel around Europe in order to find a prince suitable for the throne of Bulgaria. The three man team searched in Belgrade and Vienna and were refused entry into Russia before settling on Ferdinand of Saxe-Coburg-Gotha, to whom they offered the crown.

Grekov was appointed prime minister on 30 January 1899 and was removed from office on 13 October that same year after a brief and unremarkable tenure.

Political offices
Preceded by Konstantin Stoilov	Prime Minister of Bulgaria; 1899	Succeeded by Todor Ivanchov
Preceded by office established	Minister of Justice; 1879–1880	Succeeded by Hristo Stoyanov
Preceded by Georgi Teoharov	Minister of Interior; 1882–1883	Succeeded by Georgi Teoharov
Preceded by Stefan Stambolov	Minister of Foreign Affairs; 1890–1894	Succeeded by Grigor Nachovich
Preceded by Konstantin Stoilov	Minister of Foreign Affairs; 1899	Succeeded by Todor Ivanchov
