= Ministry of Finance (Bulgaria) =

Government ministry of Bulgaria

- Министерство на финансите

Agency overview
- Formed: 1879
- Jurisdiction: Government of Bulgaria
- Headquarters: 102 Rakovski str. Sofia, Bulgaria
- Minister responsible: Galab Donev
- Website: minfin.bg/en/

The Ministry of Finance (Bulgarian: Министерство на финансите) of Bulgaria was established in 1879 in accordance with the Tarnovo Constitution. The Ministry is responsible for formulating and implementing the budget and the fiscal and financial policy of Bulgaria. As of April 2024 the Finance Minister of Bulgaria is Temenuzhka Petkova.

== Related agencies ==
- Audit of EU Funds Executive Agency
- Bulgarian Development Bank
- Customs Agency
- National Revenue Agency
- National Compensation Housing Fund
- Public Finance Inspection Agency
- State Commission on Gambling

== See also ==
- Economy of Bulgaria
- List of Bulgarian finance ministers
