= Conservative Party (Bulgaria) =

Conservative Party Консервативна партия Konservativna Partiya
- Founded: 1879
- Ideology: Conservatism; Classical liberalism

The Conservative Party (Bulgarian: Консервативна партия) was a party formed in 1879 as one of Bulgaria's two major parties. It was linked with the newspapers Vitosha, Balgarski Glas and Otechestvo.

== History ==
The Conservative party was formed by the leaders of the conservative movement in the Constituent Assembly. It was less popular than the Liberal Party, but had a close relationship with the monarch Alexander of Battenberg, who tasked them with forming Bulgaria's first two governments, despite their electoral loss in the 1879 election. Following a motion of no confidence and snap elections in 1880, they went into opposition. The party supported the 1881 coup and resulting authoritarian regime of Prince Alexander, which suspended the Tarnovo Constitution and was a member of all his governments from 1881 to 1883. When the constitution was restored in 1883 it joined Dragan Tsankov's second government led by his moderate liberals. In 1884 its pro-Russian faction (led by Todor Burmov, Kliment of Tarnovo, Marko Balabanov and Todor Ikonomov) joined the moderate liberals into the Tsankovist Party (later renamed Progressive Liberal). Soon afterwards most of its pro-Austrian faction (led by Grigor Nachovich, Dimitar Grekov and Georgi Valkovich) merged into the Stambolovist Liberals. Many of its remaining members joined the People's Party in 1894.

== Political positions ==
The party's base of support was mostly the clergy, rich urban merchants and the rural wealthy. During the Constituent Assembly it proposed amendments aimed at strengthening of the monarch's powers, introducing a bicameral legislature and restricting freedom of speech and press. The Party was split in terms of foreign policy, with a stronger pro-Russian faction and a weaker pro-Austrian faction.

== Important members ==
- Marko Balabanov (1837–1921)
- Todor Burmov (1834–1906)
- Georgi Valkovich (1833–1892)
- Dimitar Grekov (1847–1901)
- Todor Ikonomov (1835–1892)
- Kliment Turnovski (1841–1901)
- Grigor Nachovich (1845–1920)
- Konstantin Stoilov (1853–1901)
- Ivan Hadzhienov (1843–1923)

== Sources ==
- Ташев, Ташо. Министрите на България 1879-1999. София, АИ "Проф. Марин Дринов" / Изд. на МО, 1999. ISBN 978-954-430-603-8 / ISBN 978-954-509-191-9
- D. Popov. "Партийната структура в България от 1879 до 1901 година"
