= Grigor Nachovich =

Bulgarian politician and diplomat

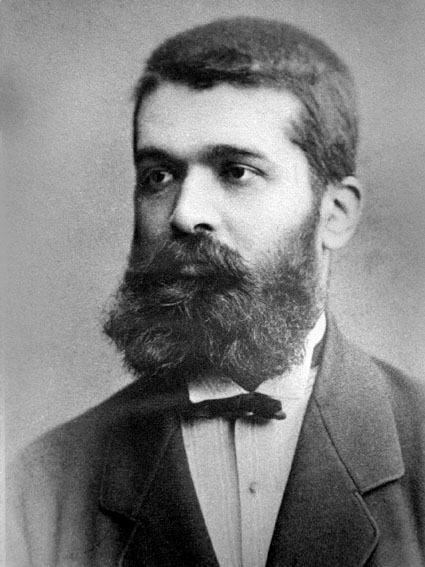
Grigor Nachovich (1845–1920), Bulgarian politician and diplomat

Grigor Dimitrov Nachovich (Bulgarian: Григор Димитров Начович; 3 February 1845 – 4 January 1920) was a Bulgarian politician and diplomat. One of the early leaders of the Conservative Party and the country's first Minister of Finance, he served as a minister in a number of Bulgarian governments (including some formed by liberal parties) from the late 1879 to 1900, and was also mayor of Sofia in 1896–1897.

Nachovich was born in the Danubian town of Svishtov in the Ottoman Empire on 3 February [O.S. 22 January] 1845 to the family of a wealthy Bulgarian merchant. He studied at the Greek-language school in Svishtov, at a French-language college and at economy schools in Paris and Vienna. He graduated in political economy in Paris and returned to Svishtov to work as a merchant. In 1866, he headed the local revolutionary committee aimed at liberating Bulgaria from Ottoman rule.

After Filip Totyu's armed detachment invaded Bulgaria in 1867, Nachovich was forced to flee to Bucharest, Romania, fearing government persecution due to his involvement in the revolutionary movement. In Romania, Nachovich co-operated with the Band of Virtues, a Bulgarian expatriate organisation, and financed volunteer participation in the Belgrade-based Second Bulgarian Legion. In 1868, he settled in Vienna. In the capital of Austria-Hungary, he worked at the local branch of his father's trading company. He founded the literary society Progress (Напредък, Napredak) and contributed to various French and German-language newspapers. During the Serbo-Turkish conflict in 1876, Nachovich aided Bulgarian volunteers who assisted the Serbian forces. For the course of the Russo-Turkish War two years later, Nachovich served at the Russian general staff.

After the Liberation of Bulgaria in the wake of that war and the establishment of the Principality of Bulgaria, Nachovich became a prominent figure in conservative Bulgarian politics. He was minister of finance in the first ever Bulgarian government headed by Todor Burmov as well as three years later (1879 and 1882–1883), minister of external affairs and religion (1879–1880), assistant-mayor of the capital Sofia (1880–1881), minister of internal affairs (1882), and member of the State Council during Prince Alexander Battenberg's personal régime (1881–1883). As the regime ended, Nachovich also headed the ministry of finance during Dragan Tsankov's coalition government (1883–1884). In 1882, he became a correspondent member of what is today the Bulgarian Academy of Sciences; in 1884, he became a full member.

In 1884, Nachovich was appointed Bulgaria's diplomatic representative in Bucharest, Romania, a post he formally held until 1889. After Prince Alexander's dethronement in 1886, Nachovich returned to the country to serve as minister of finance in several governments from 1886 to 1888. From 1889 to 1891, Nachovich represented Bulgaria in Vienna, Austria-Hungary, only to return to Bulgaria as a minister of finance and minister of internal affairs (1891–1892 and 1894–1896), mayor of Sofia (1896–1897) and minister of commerce and agriculture (1899–1900). From 1903 to 1906, Nachovich was Bulgarian diplomatic representative in Istanbul (Tsarigrad), Ottoman Empire. In 1913, he took part in the Treaty of London negotiations during the Balkan Wars.

Grigor Nachovich died in Sofia on 4 January 1920, aged 74.

Political offices
Preceded by vacant	Minister of Finance; 17 July 1879 – 7 April 1880	Succeeded by Petko Karavelov
Preceded by Marko Balabanov	Minister of Foreign Affairs and Religion; 6 December 1879 – 7 April 1880	Succeeded by Dragan Tsankov
Preceded by Arnold Remlingen	Minister of Internal Affairs; 12 January 1882 – 5 July 1882	Succeeded by Leonid Sobolev
Preceded by Georgi Zhelyazkovich	Minister of Finance; 5 July 1882 – 15 March 1883	Succeeded by Leonid Sobolev
Preceded by Leonid Sobolev	Minister of Public Buildings, Agriculture and Commerce interim 26 January 1883 – 15 March 1883	Succeeded by Mihail Hilkov
Preceded by Todor Burmov	Minister of Finance; 19 September 1883 – 12 January 1884	Succeeded by Mihail Sarafov
Preceded by Konstantin Stoilov	Minister of Foreign Affairs and Religion; 28 August 1886 – 1 September 1887	Succeeded by Georgi Stranski
Preceded by Ivan Evstratiev Geshov	Minister of Finance interim 28 August 1886 – 7 September 1886	Succeeded by Ivan Evstratiev Geshov
Preceded by Konstantin Stoilov	Minister of Finance; 1 September 1887 – 24 December 1888	Succeeded by Ivan Salabashev
Preceded by Hristo Belchev	Minister of Finance; 31 March 1891 – 30 November 1892	Succeeded by Ivan Salabashev
Preceded by Dimitar Grekov	Minister of Foreign Affairs and Religion; 31 May 1894 – 22 February 1896	Succeeded by Dimitar Grekov
Preceded by Dimitar Petkov	Minister of Public Buildings, Roads and Communications interim 31 May 1894 – 29 September 1894	Succeeded by Konstantin Velichkov
Preceded by Ivan Evstratiev Geshov	Minister of Commerce and Agriculture; 22 February 1896 – 12 January 1897	Succeeded by Ivan Evstratiev Geshov
Preceded by Dimitar Mollov	Mayor of Sofia; 1 October 1896 – 7 April 1897	Succeeded by Dimitar Yablanski
Preceded by Nayden Benev	Minister of Commerce and Agriculture; 30 January 1899 – 21 September 1900	Succeeded by Yov Titorov
