= Tarnovo Constitution =

Constitution of Bulgaria from 1879 to 1947

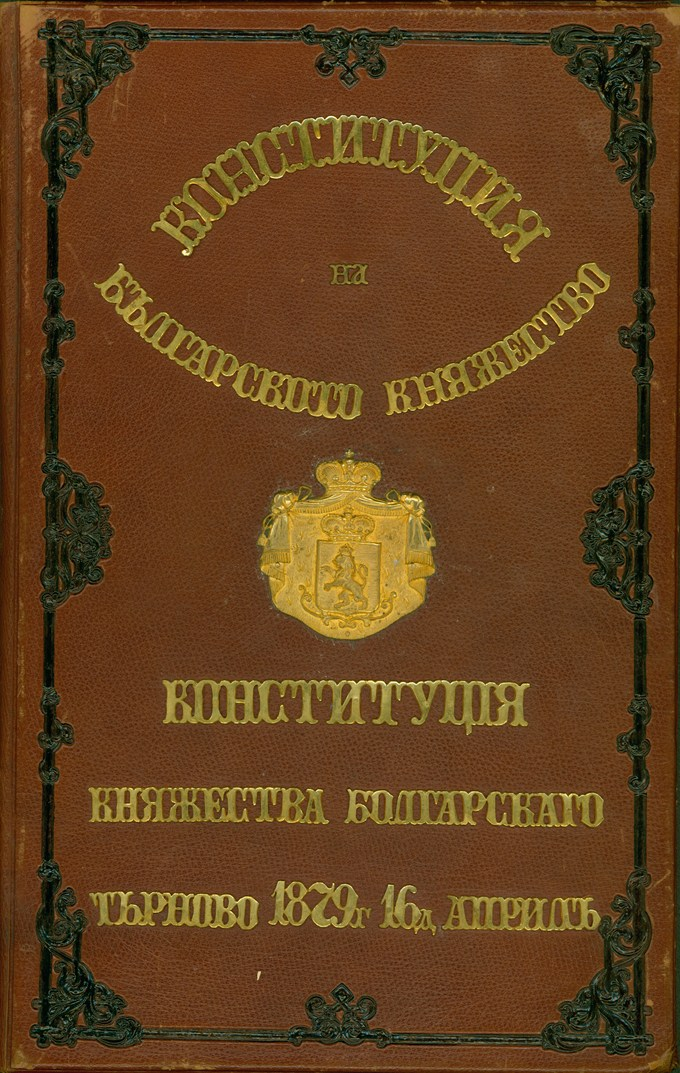
- Front cover of the Tarnovo Constitution

Overview
- Original title: Търновска конституция
- Jurisdiction: Bulgaria
- Date effective: 16 April 1879 (O.S.)
- Repealed: 4 December 1947
- Author: Constituent Assembly

The Tarnovo Constitution (Bulgarian: Търновска конституция) was the first constitution of Bulgaria.

It was adopted on 28 April [O.S. 16 April] 1879 by the Constituent National Assembly held in Veliko Tarnovo as part of the establishment of the Principality of Bulgaria. It remained the fundamental law of Bulgaria after the country was elevated to a kingdom in 1908.

Based on the Belgian charter of 1831, the Constitution was liberal in character and was considered advanced for its time. It defined the function and competence of the central organs of state authority according to the principle of separation of powers among an executive, a legislative, and a judiciary branch. It provided for ministerial responsibility, immunity of the deputies, and inviolability of private property. The constitution included a clause that formally established Eastern Orthodoxy as the official religion of the nation, although people of other religions were considered equal to those who followed the official faith.

With amendments in 1893 and 1911 that strengthened royal power, the Tarnovo Constitution remained in use until 4 December 1947, when it was replaced by the Dimitrov Constitution.

== Form of government and head of state ==
According to the constitution of 1879, Bulgaria was declared to be a constitutional, hereditary monarchy with a parliament whose members were elected by the people. The monarch bore the title of Prince and not tsar, as it was during the First and the Second Bulgarian Empire, since the treaty of Berlin from 1878 restricted Bulgaria's independence to a certain degree and made it a de facto vassal state of Turkey. The Prince was supposed to be male and of Orthodox religion, although, in a legal act, an exception to the religious restriction was made when electing the Lutheran Alexander of Battenberg as the first Prince.

The Prince had the power to initiate a legislative campaign and to coordinate the activities of the prime minister and the cabinet. Although the ministers were entitled to act as if they were representing the Prince, by signing with their own signature they agreed to take responsibility for what resulted from their actions. The Prince's signature was also required for a bill to become law after it had passed through parliament.

In 1908, when Prince Ferdinand Saxe-Coburg-Gotha proclaimed the independence of Bulgaria, he raised the country to a kingdom and assumed the title "tzar" (translated as king outside of Bulgaria). The Tarnovo Constitution was amended to change the official name of the country to the "Kingdom of Bulgaria" and substitute the word "Prince" with "tzar" wherever it occurred in the document.

== General regulations regarding citizens and society ==
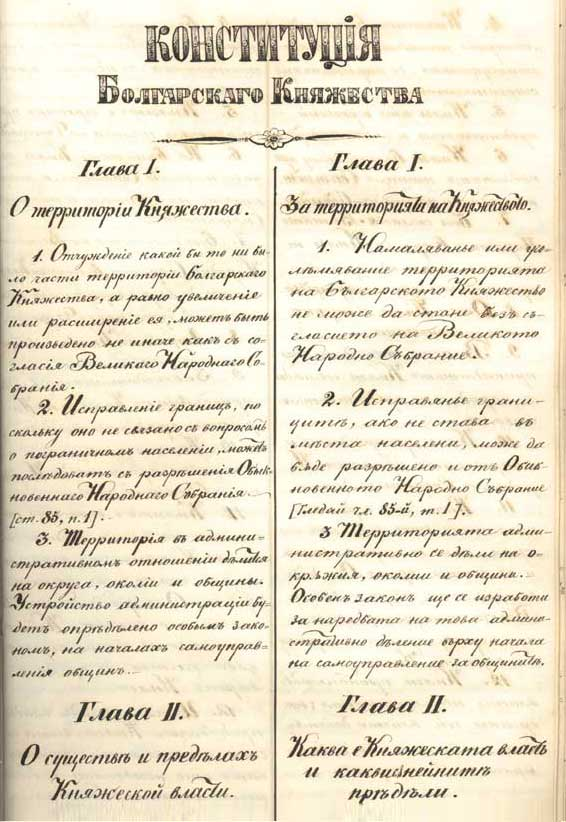
First page (in Russian and Bulgarian)

In accordance with its constitution, Bulgaria promulgated equality for all its citizens and, despite being a monarchy, prohibited the promotion of any kind of aristocratic titles. Censorship was prohibited, although the article which stated this was suspended several times. Article 61, which dealt with slavery and human trafficking, was one of the reasons why the Tarnovo Constitution was considered liberal and advanced for its time:

Art. 61. No one in the Bulgarian Kingdom has the right to buy or sell human beings. Every slave of whatever sex, nationality, or religion is free as soon as he sets foot on Bulgarian territory.

The Constitution declared property rights to be sacrosanct and implied that all citizens, except for the monarch and his successor, must pay taxes to the state. All (male) citizens were obliged to serve in the military; this requirement included the monarch (who was head of the military forces) and his successors. All citizens were allowed freedom of association, and were free to form political parties or start their own companies.

The Tarnovo Constitution prohibited punishment of a citizen whose case had not been examined by a court. This rule was ignored by the "People's Tribunal" of 1945, during the Soviet occupation of the country. The tribunal did not hold the statute of а court, yet passed more than 10,000 sentences to people who were seen as a threat by the Bulgarian Communist Party, which was coming to power at the time.

== Temporary suspensions ==
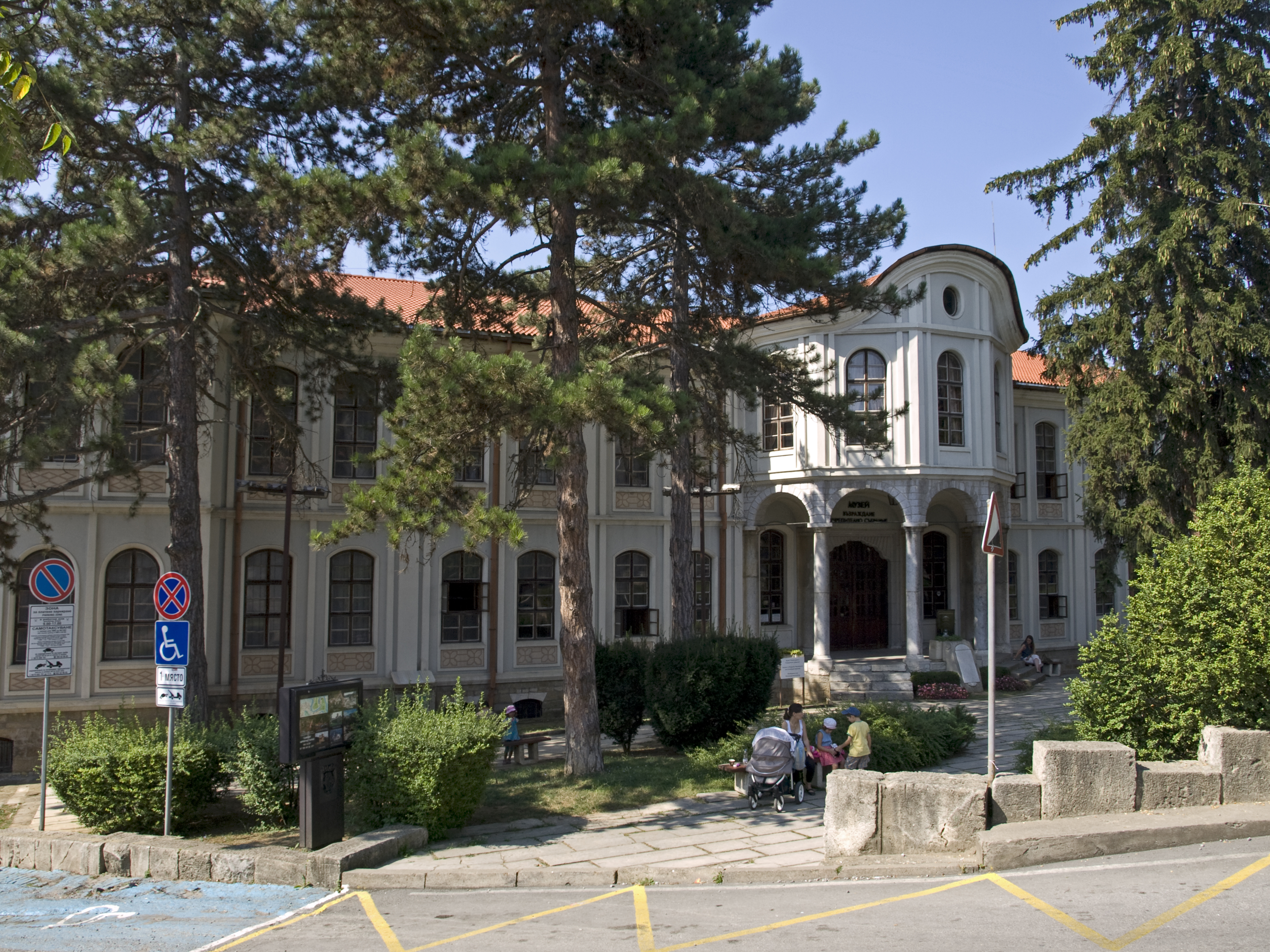
The former palace of Ottoman general-governor of Tarnovo, where the constitution was adopted.

The article prohibiting censorship was suspended in the 1880s by a law enforced by the Russian general Sobolev; this law restricted media to seven selected newspapers and magazines, and limited comments critical of the government. Similar regulations were in effect in the late era of Stefan Stambolov's government.

In 1881, the Grand National Assembly (the supreme form of parliament) was manipulated by the principal Alexander I of Battenberg in order to suspend the entire constitution. During the next seven years, the monarch had unlimited power and issued a series of ordinances that were only technically approved by the ministers. This period, which Bulgarian historians refer to as a regime, ended in 1883 when the constitution was restored.

The Tarnovo Constitution was temporarily suspended several times more, most notably during the Coup d'état of 1934 led by Kimon Georgiev and the Coup d'état of 1944 organized by the Bulgarian Communist Party.

== Definitive abolishment ==
The Referendum of 1946 led to the transition from a constitutional monarchy to a people's republic. The referendum took place during the Soviet occupation of the country and was also technically illegal since the Tarnovo Constitution did not provide for a change in the type of government.

The Tarnovo Constitution was permanently abolished in 1947 when another one, bearing the name of the communist party's leader Georgi Dimitrov, came into effect. The Dimitrov Constitution was a thoroughly Communist document that allowed censorship and the establishment of a one-party system while depriving citizens of certain fundamental rights .
