= Stefan Stambolov =

Bulgarian politician (1854–1895)

- Стефан Стамболов
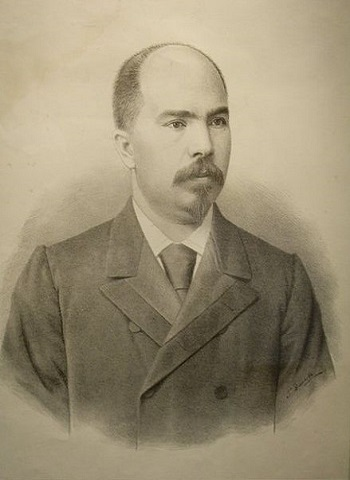

9th Prime Minister of Bulgaria
- In office 1 September 1887 – 31 May 1894
- Monarch: Ferdinand
- Preceded by: Konstantin Stoilov
- Succeeded by: Konstantin Stoilov

Personal details
- Born: 13 February 1854 Tırnovo, Ottoman Empire (now Veliko Tărnovo, present-day Bulgaria)
- Died: 19 July 1895 (aged 41) Sofia, Principality of Bulgaria
- Resting place: Central Sofia Cemetery
- Party: Liberal Party, People's Liberal Party
- Occupation: Statesman, Poet

Stefan Nikolov Stambolov (Bulgarian: Стефан Николов Стамболов; 31 January 1854 OS – 19 July 1895) was a Bulgarian politician, journalist, revolutionary, and poet who served as Prime Minister and regent. He is considered one of the most important and popular "Founders of Modern Bulgaria", and is sometimes referred to as "the Bulgarian Bismarck". In 1875 and 1876 he took part in the preparation for the Stara Zagora uprising, as well as the April Uprising. Stambolov was, after Stanko Todorov, Boyko Borisov and Todor Zhivkov, one of the country's longest-serving prime ministers. Criticised for his dictatorial methods, he was among the initiators of economic and cultural progress in Bulgaria before the time of the Balkan Wars.

He was killed in the center of Sofia by a plot from the Supreme Macedonian-Adrianople Committee (SMAC), including Naum Tyufekchiev, for his support for the Ottoman Empire, his dictatorial methods and his repression of the SMAC.

== Early years ==
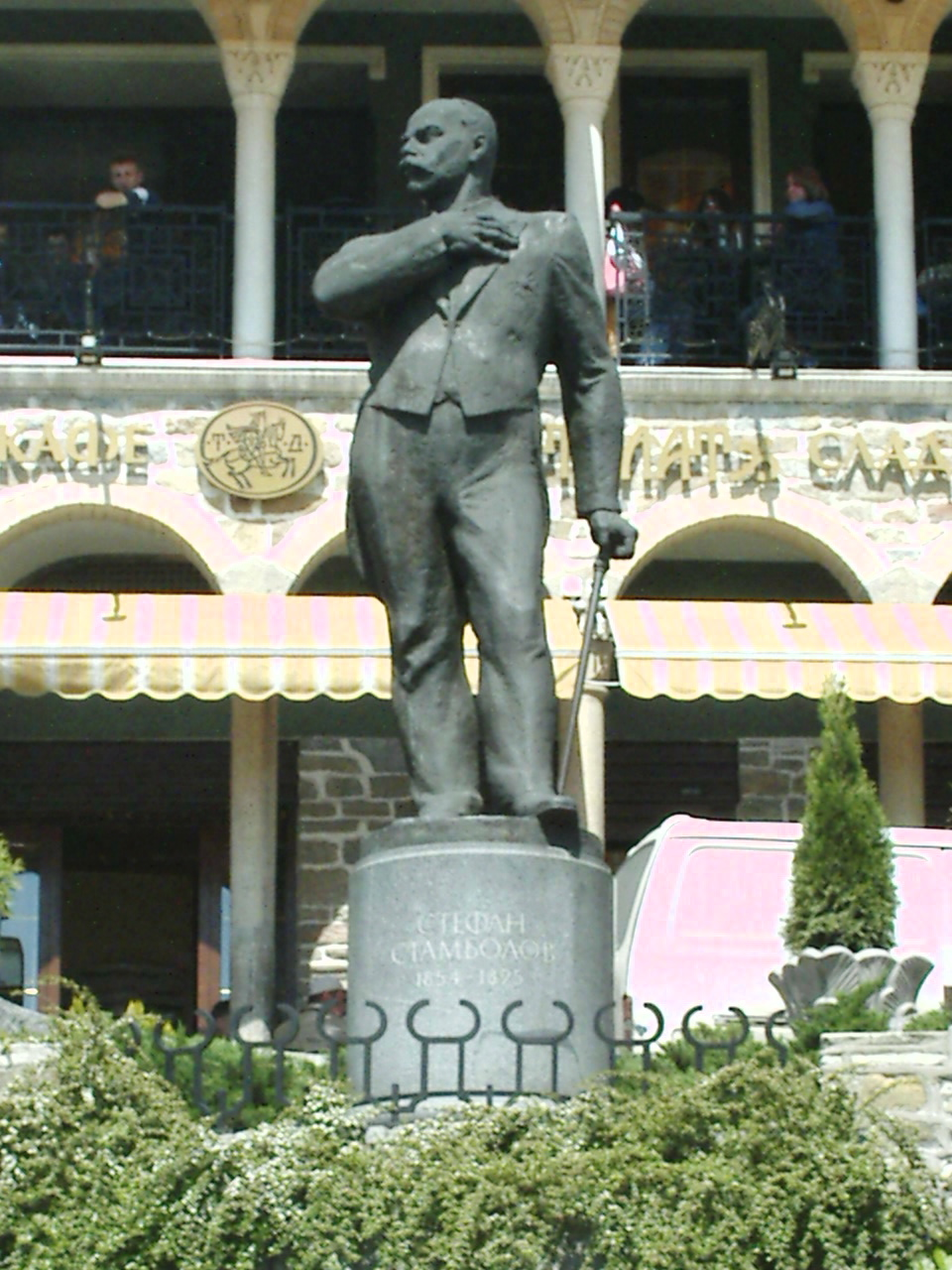
A statue of Stefan N. Stambolov in his birthplace Veliko Turnovo

Stefan Nikolov Stambolov was born in Veliko Tarnovo. His father took part in the "Velchova Zavera" plot against Turkish rule in 1835. Stambolov grew up around prominent revolutionists like Hristo Ivanov, the priest Matey Preobrazhenski, and Hristo Karaminkov. He began his education in his home town, but later (1870–1872) studied at the Seminary in Odessa. In 1878 he was for a short period of time a teacher in his home town, and later he went to Romania. He joined the Bulgarian Revolutionary Central Committee (BRCC). After the death of BRCC founder Vassil Levski, Stambolov was chosen as his successor. He was the leader of the unsuccessful uprising in Stara Zagora in 1875 and of the Turnovo revolutionary committee in the great uprising of April 1876. After the Treaty of Berlin, he was a leader of the 1878–1879 Kresna–Razlog uprising.

== Political career ==
Stambolov was involved in political discussions as early as the time of the first Bulgarian parliament: the "Founding Assembly" of 1879. After 1880 he became the vice-chairman and later the chairman of the Narodno Subranie (the Bulgarian parliament). In 1885, he helped bring about the union of Bulgaria and Eastern Rumelia. On 20 August [O.S. 8 August] 1886, officers aligned with Russia overthrew Prince Alexander in a coup d'état. Stambolov led a counter-coup on 28 August which removed the provisional government, and he assumed the position of regent. Russian hostility, however, barred the restoration of Alexander, who abdicated on 8 September.

== Regency ==
At the age of 32, Stambolov found himself in the highly unusual position of being simultaneously a government minister, president, and regent for an absent monarch. Stambolov's style of governing during his regency was observed as being increasingly authoritarian. But this was, to some extent, a reaction to the grave difficulties arising from his peculiar position. Indeed, the regency has been described as marking the beginning of the tragic years of Stambolov's life.

According to a close friend, Stambolov was "almost inclined to resign the honours [of serving as regent], together with the dangers of his position, and retire to his beloved Turnovo." But he stayed on, recognizing that there was no other suitable candidate, and that if he did not lead, then Bulgaria's sovereignty would likely be lost.

Through Stambolov's efforts, a successor to Alexander was found in Ferdinand of Saxe-Coburg-Gotha, who was proclaimed Knyaz ("Ruling Prince") of autonomous Bulgaria on 7 July 1887 and crowned on 14 August 1887. However, it is known that Stambolov initially supported Carol I of Romania and that he intended to establish a union with the country. Russian opposition forced Carol I to reject the offer. Stambolov also requested to the Ottoman Empire a dual Bulgarian-Turkish state.

== Prime Minister ==
With Ferdinand's accession to the throne, Stambolov retired as regent, and became Prime Minister. He served for seven years (1887–1894).

Stambolov was a nationalist; as a politician, he strengthened the country's diplomacy, its economy, and the general political power of the state.

In 1891, he was targeted by some members of SMAC for his authoritarian methods and support for the Ottoman Empire. Naum Tyufekchiev, his two brothers and Dimitar Rizov tried to kill him. The attempt failed, but managed to kill the Minister of Finance, Hristo Belchev. The brother of Naum Tyufekchiev, Dencho was captured, tortured, and died in custody, but Naum managed to escape to Serbia and then to Odesa. He was sentenced to death in absentia.

Stambolov confronted Knyaz Ferdinand, and blocked his schemes to usurp additional authority. This caused him a lot of stress, and he became distant from his friends, and suspicious of all around him. The public came to dislike him, as he took increasingly drastic measures against his enemies. He survived an assassination attempt unharmed, but responded by having many people he suspected of taking part imprisoned and treated brutally.

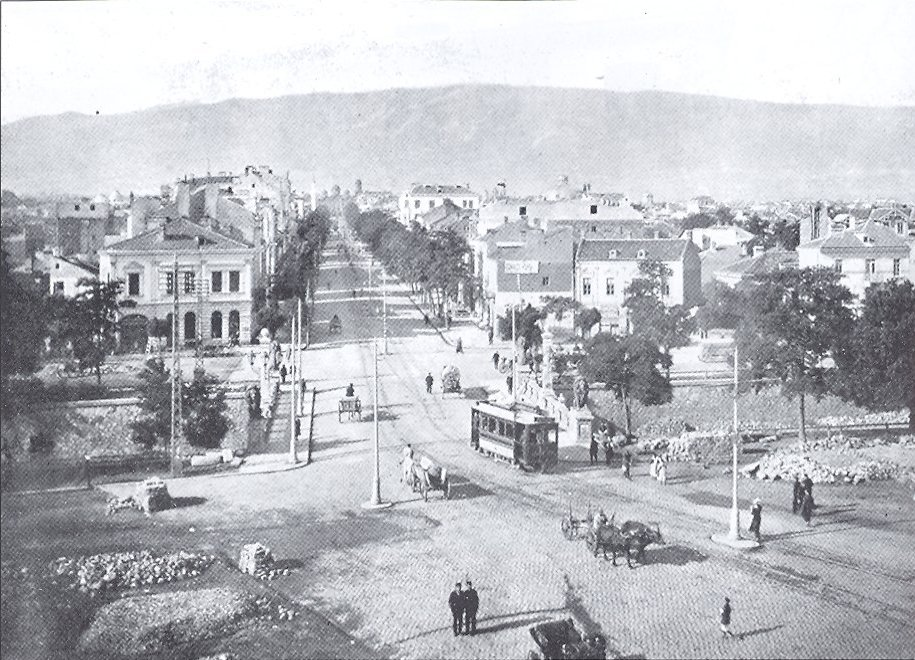
Lavov Most (Lions' Bridge) was built while Stambolov was prime minister.

By 1894, the prolonged stress from all sides had taken its toll, and Stambolov resigned, which was happily accepted by Ferdinand.

== Death ==
An assassination attempt aimed at him occurred in the center of Sofia, on the 15th of July, 1895.

While on the way to a club near his home, he was ambushed by four people. He was knocked to the ground and viciously beaten, resulting in his entire face being slashed, both of his arms almost completely severed, and his right eye gouged out.

Even though he managed to survive this attack, he was left gravely injured and needed to be hospitalized. Although he experienced a slight improvement in his condition on the 16th, he ultimately succumbed to his injuries three days later, on the 18th.

== Honours ==
Stambolov Crag on Livingston Island in the South Shetland Islands, Antarctica, is named after him.

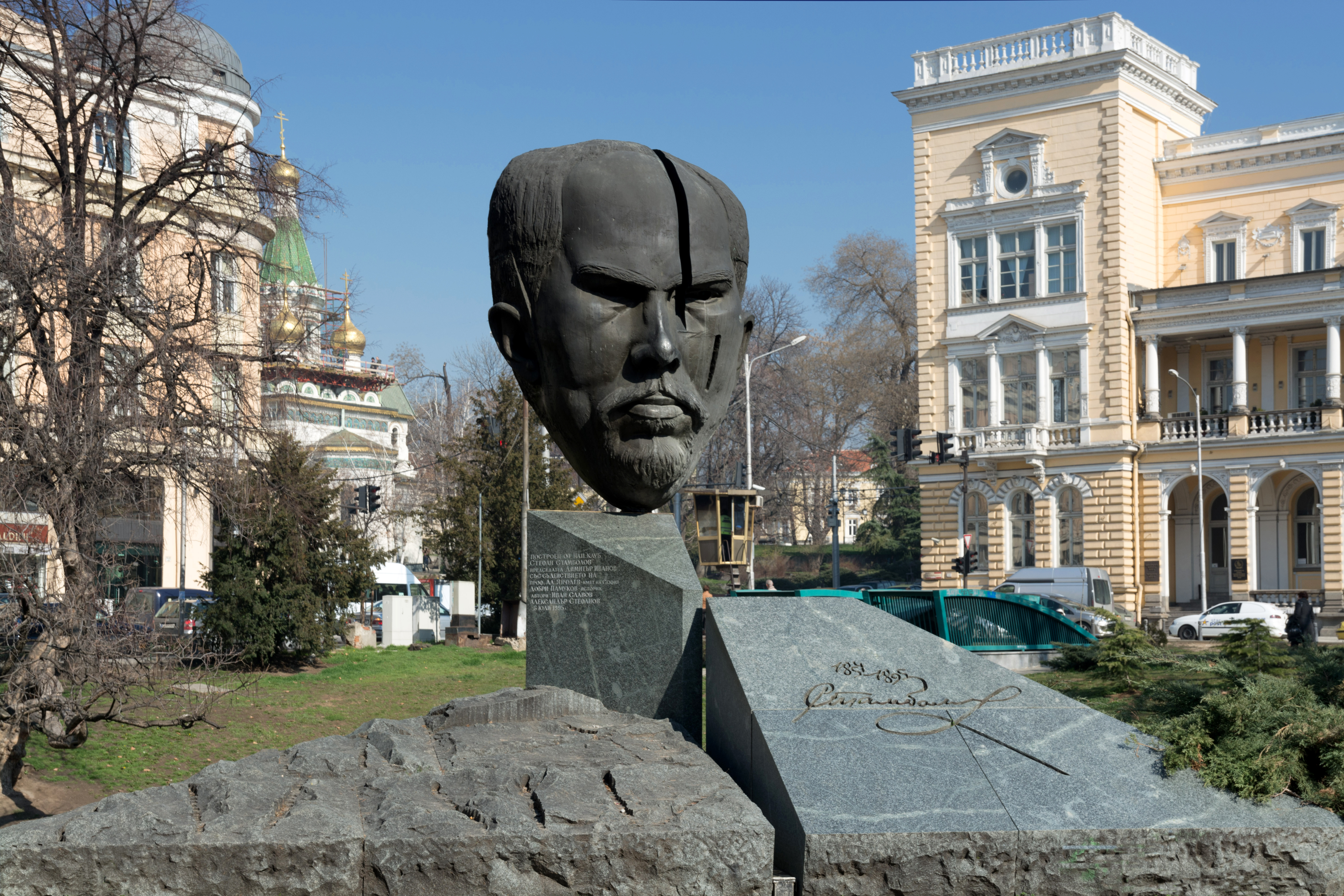
Stambolov's monument in Sofia

Stambolov was portrayed on the obverse of the Bulgarian 20 levs banknote, issued in 1999, 2007 and 2020, until the Bulgarian lev was replaced by the Euro.

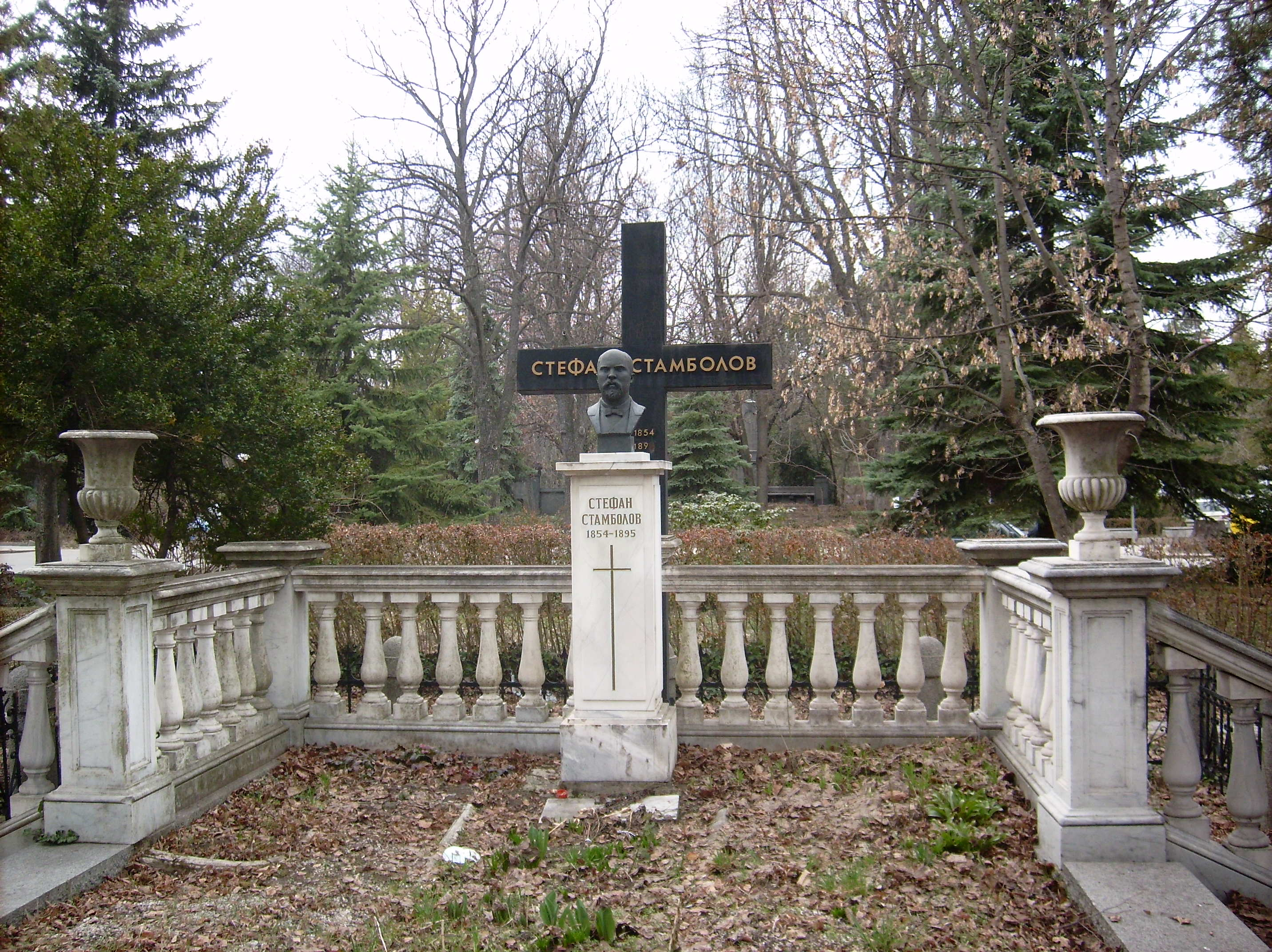
Stambolov's grave in the Central Sofia Cemetery

== Sources ==
- Markov, Georgi (2003). Pokusheniya, nasilie i politika v Balgariya 1878–1947 [Assaults, Violence and Politics in Bulgaria 1878–1947] (in Bulgarian). Sofia: Voenno izdatelstvo. ISBN 954-509-239-4.
- Dunov, Zdravko (2004). "Diktatorat i demokratat: Stefan Stambolov i Todor Ikonomov" [The Dictator and the Democrat: Stefan Stambolov and Todor Ikonomov]. Filosofski alternativi (in Bulgarian). XIII (1–2): 111–131. ISSN 0861-7899.
- Beaman, A. Hulme (1895). M. Stambuloff. New York: Frederick Warne.
- Beaman, Ardern George Hulme (1898). Twenty Years in the Near East. London: Methuen & Co. pp. 170–183. hdl:2027/uc2.ark:/13960/t3kw5gb9c.
- Perry, Duncan M. (1993). Stefan Stambolov and the Emergence of Modern Bulgaria, 1870-1895. Durham, NC: Duke University Press.

Regnal titles
Preceded by Prince Alexander of Battenberg	Regent of Bulgaria; 1886-1887	Succeeded by Ferdinand I of Bulgaria
Political offices
Preceded by Konstantin Stoilov	Prime Minister of Bulgaria; 1887-1894	Succeeded by Konstantin Stoilov
Preceded by Georgi Stranski	Minister of Foreign Affairs of Bulgaria; 1890	Succeeded by Dimitar Grekov
