= Dragan Tsankov =

Bulgarian prime minister (1828 – 1911)

Dragan Tsankov Драган Цанков

3rd Prime Minister of Bulgaria
- In office 7 April 1880 – 10 December 1880
- Monarch: Alexander
- Preceded by: Kliment Turnovski
- Succeeded by: Petko Karavelov
- In office 19 September 1883 – 11 July 1884
- Monarch: Alexander
- Preceded by: Leonid Sobolev
- Succeeded by: Petko Karavelov

Minister of Foreign Affairs
- In office 7 April 1880 – 10 December 1880
- Premier: Himself
- Preceded by: Grigor Nachovich
- Succeeded by: Nikola Stoĭchev

Personal details
- Born: 9 November 1828 Svishtov, Ottoman Empire
- Died: 24 March 1911 (aged 82) Sofia, Bulgaria
- Party: Progressive Liberal Party (from 1899)

Dragan Kiriakov Tsankov (Bulgarian: Драган Киряков Цанков) (9 November 1828 – 24 March 1911) was a Bulgarian politician and the first Liberal Party Prime Minister of the country.

He was born in Svishtov. Tsankov was initially a civil servant in the administration of the Ottoman Empire, who in the 1850s gained a reputation as a supporter of the Bulgarian Greek Catholic Church. His paper Bũlgaria appeared in Constantinople in 1859 and espoused his religious positions. Funded by France, the paper argued that a Uniat with Rome was the only solution to Bulgaria. Indeed, Tsankov, who was educated by the Jesuits, helped to form the Bulgarian Greek Catholic Church in 1861.

Later he became closely associated with opposition to the Ottomans and the independence movement. Tsankov was initially opposed to the April Uprising but he soon changed his opinion and began to be active in support of independence. He served as deputy to Nayden Gerov in the Governorship of Svishtov during the brief period of Russian administration in Bulgaria. A leading figure in the drive towards independence, he became respected as the voice of moderate liberalism, as he was prepared to work with the Conservatives after 1879.

After some failed attempts to form a Conservative-led administration, Tsankov was appointed as Prime Minister on 7 April 1880 with plans for a wide-ranging raft of reforms. His new reforms, which included the establishment of a militia, limited rights for Muslims and attempts to limit the power of the Bulgarian Orthodox Church alarmed Alexander of Bulgaria, who feared the possibility of a liberal revolution. A series of foreign policy errors involving relations with Austria-Hungary followed (largely caused by the lack of communication between Tsankov and the Tsar) and his ministry was forced to resign before the year was out.

He initially kept an open mind about the military coup of 1881, although he eventually called on his supporters to oppose the new system by all legal means, resulting in him being placed under house arrest. However the failure of military rule forced Alexander to restore civilian government, with Tsankov returning as Premier on 19 September 1883 at the head of a coalition government. Tsankov's second rule was seen as largely transitional and it also saw the Liberal Party splitting, with Petko Karavelov gaining a large groundswell of support. Eventually he was dismissed as Prime Minister and replaced by Karavelov in 1884.

After his removal from office, Tsankov split off to form his own party, the Progressive Liberals. Although the group did not see government until 1902 and the rule of Stoyan Danev, Tsankov remained an important figure in Bulgarian politics and a constant voice in support of ever closer relations with Russia until his death.

== Literature / Works ==
- Cankof, A. Kyriak & Cankof, D. Kyriak – Grammatik der bulgarischen Sprache (1852) / Grammar of the Bulgarian language

Political offices
Preceded by Kliment Turnovski	Prime Minister of Bulgaria; 1880	Succeeded by Petko Karavelov
Preceded by Leonid Sobolev	Prime Minister of Bulgaria; 1883–1884	Succeeded by Petko Karavelov
Preceded by Grigor Nachovich	Minister of Foreign Affairs; 1880	Succeeded by Nikola Stoichev
