= Leonid Sobolev =

Russian army general (1844–1913)

Leonid Sobolev Леонид Соболев
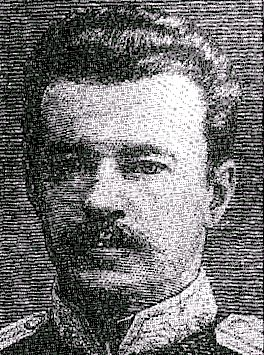

6th Prime Minister of Bulgaria
- In office 5 July 1882 – 19 September 1883
- Monarch: Alexander
- Preceded by: Vacant (Alexander's Authoritarian Regime)
- Succeeded by: Dragan Tsankov

Minister of Interior
- In office 5 July 1882 – 16 April 1883
- Premier: Himself
- Preceded by: Grigor Nachovich
- Succeeded by: Nestor Markov
- In office 15 August 1883 – 19 September 1883
- Premier: Himself
- Preceded by: Nestor Markov
- Succeeded by: Dragan Tsankov

Personal details
- Born: 9 June 1844 Toropetsky District, Russian Empire
- Died: 13 October 1913 (aged 69) Toropetsky District, Russian Empire

Military service
- Allegiance: Russian Empire
- Branch/service: Imperial Russian Army
- Rank: Lieutenant-General
- Commands: 1st Brigade, 37th Infantry division
- Battles/wars: Russo-Turkish War

Leonid Nikolayevich Sobolev (Russian: Леонид Николаевич Соболев) (9 June 1844 – 13 October 1913) was an Imperial Russian Army general and politician.

A veteran of the Russo-Turkish War of 1877–78, General Sobolev was the main proponent of the strand of Russian foreign and military policy that saw for the Russians a duty to expel the Ottoman Empire from Europe and to take the Bosphorus for Russia in order to ensure full access to the Mediterranean Sea. Recognising that the United Kingdom maintained a policy of preventing this Sobolev advocated mobilising forces near Afghanistan and British India in order to distract British attention from the Ottomans and give a Russia a free hand in that region.

Sobolev was one of two young Russian generals appointed to the Bulgarian cabinet in April 1882 by Alexander. Sobolev was appointed both Prime Minister of Bulgaria and Minister of the Interior, with his fellow Russian general Aleksandr Kaulbars as Minister of War. Sobolev awarded the other cabinet posts to members of the Conservative Party and won their favour by endorsing laws to reduce the size of the National Assembly of Bulgaria and limit the franchise to educated property owners, measures that ensured the Liberals were all but eliminated.

Sobolev however irked his Bulgarian allies when he dismissed the state as "just another Khanate", comparing it to the Khanate of Bukhara where he had been governor. He further annoyed the newly elected Conservative Assembly members with his aristocratic manner and his over-the-top attempts to bribe them, which even included leaving confectionery on each member's desk. Soon Sobolev was at loggerheads with the Assembly over the presence of a force of Russian Dragoons in Bulgaria and over ownership of the railways.

Eventually, with the aid of pro-Russian Orthodox leader Metropolitan Mileti of Sofia, Sobolev forced the resignation of his nemesis Konstantin Stoilov, the Minister for Foreign and Religious Affairs, although Stoilov's departure prompted two other leading Conservatives to also quit the cabinet. With the government in ruins Sobolev turned to the Liberal leader Dragan Tsankov for a new coalition but he had another agenda in mind. Tsankov won the support of both Alexander and the assembly for a constitutional restoration after convincing all parties that Russian influence had become too strong. Outmanoeuvred Sobolev resigned on 7 September along with Kaulbars leaving the premiership to Tsankov.

Political offices
Preceded by Vacant (Alexander's Authoritarian Regime)	Prime Minister of Bulgaria; 1882–1883	Succeeded by Dragan Tsankov
Preceded by Grigor Nachovich	Minister of Interior; 1882–1883	Succeeded by Nestor Markov
Preceded by Nestor Markov	Minister of Interior; 1883	Succeeded by Dragan Tsankov
