= Konstantin Stoilov =

Prime Minister of Bulgaria (1853–1901)

Konstantin Stoilov Константин Стоилов
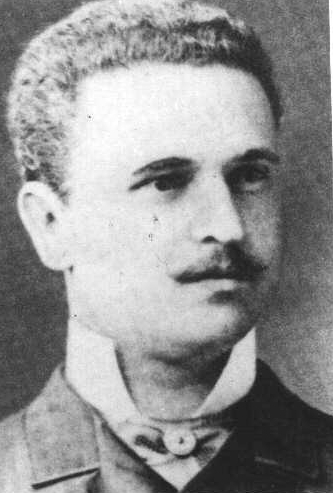

8th Prime Minister of Bulgaria
- In office 31 May 1894 – 30 January 1899
- Monarch: Ferdinand
- Preceded by: Stefan Stambolov
- Succeeded by: Dimitar Grekov
- In office 10 July 1887 – 1 September 1887
- Monarch: Ferdinand
- Preceded by: Vasil Radoslavov
- Succeeded by: Stefan Stambolov

Personal details
- Born: 23 September 1853 O.S. Plovdiv, Ottoman Empire
- Died: March 23, 1901 (aged 47) Sofia, Bulgaria
- Resting place: Central Sofia Cemetery; 42°42′48″N 23°20′0.5″E
- Party: Conservative Party (until 1894); People's Party (1894–1901)
- Occupation: Doctor of Law

Konstantin Stoilov (Bulgarian: Константин Стоилов) (23 September 1853 O.S. – 23 March 1901 O.S.) was a leading Bulgarian politician and twice Prime Minister. Simeon Radev described him as the most European-like of all Bulgarian politicians.

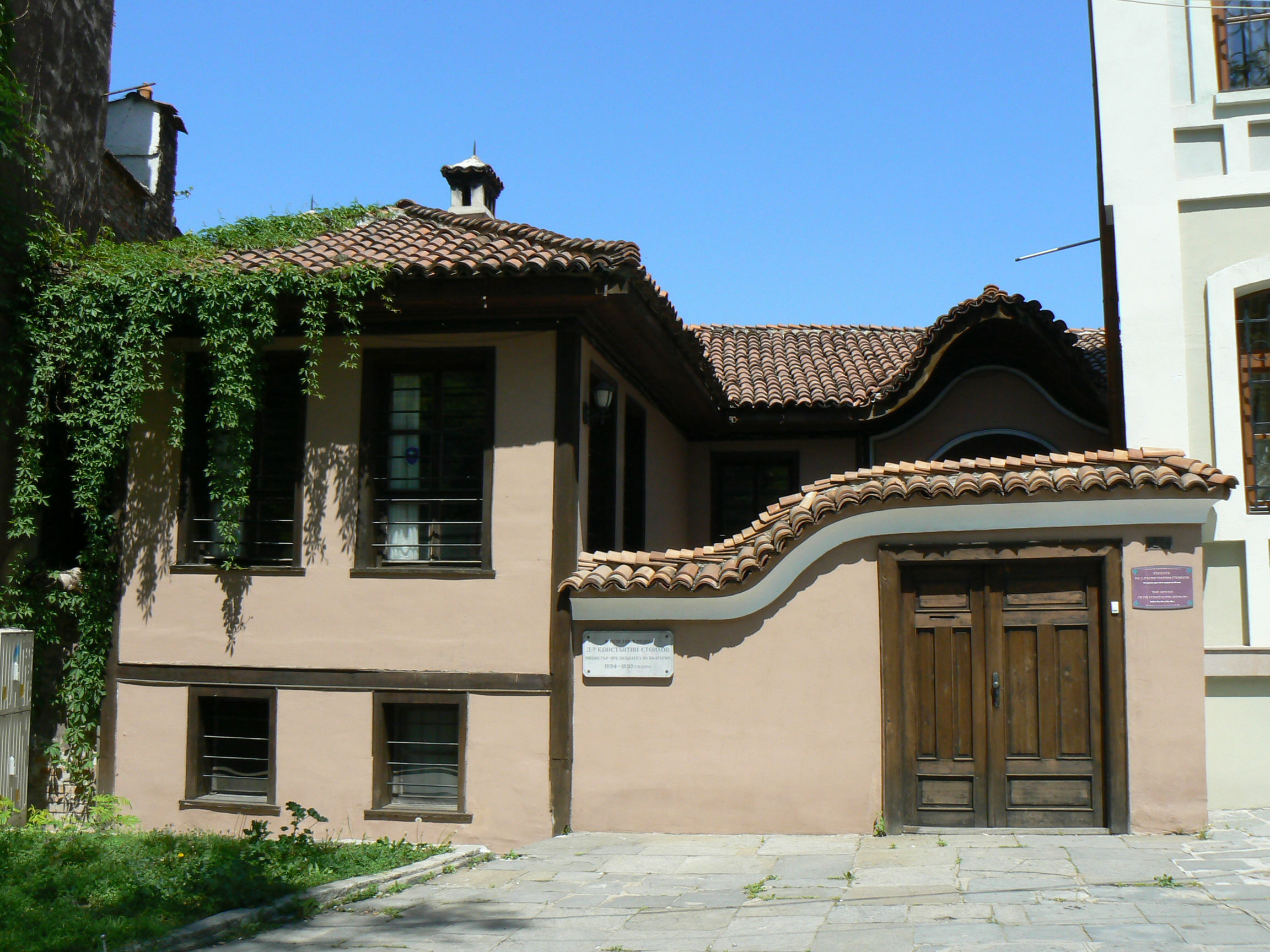
The home of Konstantin Stoilov in the Old town of Plovdiv

Born in Plovdiv, Stoilov studied at Robert College in Istanbul, before studying law at Ruprecht Karl University of Heidelberg to doctorate level. Whilst in Germany he became a Freemason.

A career politician with the Conservative Party, and later his own People's Party, he held a number of government portfolios including Foreign Minister, Law Minister and Interior Affairs Minister, and Minister of Finance. His first reign as Prime Minister lasted only for a brief spell in 1887. He returned in 1894 to preside over a longer ministry, which was characterized by increasing toleration for the activities of the Internal Macedonian Revolutionary Organization as well as fairer treatment of the Jews (as a lawyer, Stoilov had successfully defended the Jews of Vratsa from allegations of blood libel in 1890). Stoilov's government faced a campaign of criticism from sections of the press as organised by his main political opponent Stefan Stambolov and as a consequence the Stoilov administration enacted legislation against Stambolov, notably sequestering his land for state use and abolishing the pensions paid to former government ministers. The Stoilov-led coalition remained in office until 1899 when a series of liberal administrations began. He remained an important figure in Bulgarian politics until his death.

Political offices
| Preceded by Vasil Radoslavov | Prime Minister of Bulgaria; 1887 | Succeeded by Stefan Stambolov |
| Preceded by Stefan Stambolov | Prime Minister of Bulgaria; 1894–1899 | Succeeded by Dimitar Grekov |
| Preceded by Nikola Stoichev | Minister of Foreign Affairs and Religion; 1881 | Succeeded by Georgi Valkovich |
| Preceded by Georgi Valkovich | Minister of Foreign Affairs and Religion; 1883 | Succeeded by Kiryak Tsankov |
| Preceded by Hristo Stoyanov | Minister of Foreign Affairs and Religion; 1886 | Succeeded by Grigor Nachovich |
| Preceded by Grigor Nachovich | Minister of Foreign Affairs and Religion; 1896–1899 | Succeeded by Dimitar Grekov |
