= Alexander of Battenberg =

Prince of Bulgaria from 1879 to 1886

Alexander I: Александър I
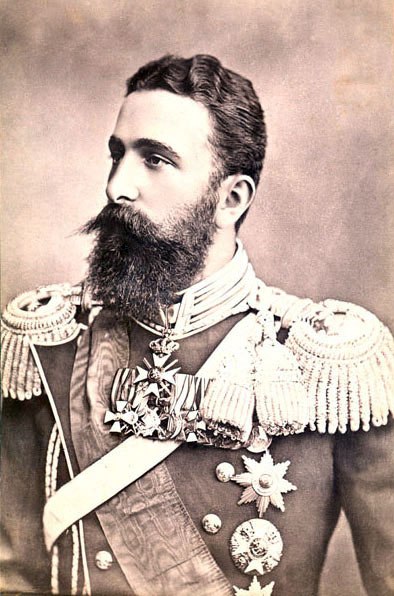
- Formal portrait, c. 1879–1893

Prince of Bulgaria
- Reign: 29 April 1879 – 7 September 1886
- Predecessor: Vacant (title last held by Constantine II)
- Successor: Ferdinand I
- Born: 5 April 1857; Verona, Kingdom of Lombardy–Venetia, Austrian Empire
- Died: 17 November 1893 (aged 36); Graz, Duchy of Styria, Austria-Hungary
- Burial: Battenberg Mausoleum, Sofia
- Spouse: Johanna Loisinger (m. 1889)
- Issue: Count Assen of Hartenau; Countess Tsvetana of Hartenau
Names
- Alexander Joseph von Battenberg; Bulgarian: Александър Йозеф фон Батенберг
- House: Battenberg
- Father: Prince Alexander of Hesse and by Rhine
- Mother: Julia, Princess of Battenberg

Alexander Joseph von Battenberg (Bulgarian: Александър I Батенберг; 5 April 1857 – 17 November 1893) was the first prince (knyaz) of the autonomous Principality of Bulgaria from 1879 until his abdication in 1886.

The Bulgarian Grand National Assembly elected him as Prince of autonomous Bulgaria in 1879. He dissolved the assembly the following year and suspended the Constitution in 1881, considering it too liberal. He restored the Constitution in 1883, leading to open conflict with Russia that made him popular in Bulgaria. Unification with Eastern Rumelia was achieved and recognised by the powers in 1885. A coup carried out by pro-Russian Bulgarian Army officers forced him to abdicate in September 1886. He later became a general in the Austrian army.

== Early life ==
Alexander was the second son of Prince Alexander of Hesse and by Rhine by the latter's morganatic marriage with Countess Julia von Hauke. The Countess and her descendants gained the title of Princess of Battenberg (derived from an old residence of the Grand Dukes of Hesse) and the style Durchlaucht ("Serene Highness") in 1858.

Prince Alexander was a nephew of Russia's Tsar Alexander II, who had married a sister of Prince Alexander of Hesse. His mother, member of the Hauke family, the daughter of Polish general Hans Moritz von Hauke, had been lady-in-waiting to the Tsaritsa. Alexander was known to his family, and many later biographers, as "Sandro" or "Drino".

Alexander's brother, Prince Louis of Battenberg, married Princess Victoria of Hesse and by Rhine, a granddaughter of Queen Victoria. Their children included Queen Louise of Sweden, Earl Mountbatten of Burma and Princess Alice of Battenberg, the mother of Prince Philip, Duke of Edinburgh, husband of Queen Elizabeth II.

Alexander's other brother, Prince Henry of Battenberg, married Queen Victoria's youngest daughter Princess Beatrice. Among their children was Queen Victoria Eugenia of Spain.

== Prince of Bulgaria ==
In his boyhood and early youth, Alexander frequently visited Saint Petersburg, and he accompanied his uncle, Tsar Alexander II, who was much attached to him, during the Bulgarian campaign of 1877.

When, under the Treaty of Berlin (1878), Bulgaria became an autonomous principality under the suzerainty of the Ottoman Empire, the Tsar recommended his nephew to the Bulgarians as a candidate for the newly created throne, and the Grand National Assembly unanimously elected Prince Alexander as Prince of Bulgaria (29 April 1879). At that time he held a commission as a lieutenant in the Prussian life-guards at Potsdam.

Before proceeding to Bulgaria, Prince Alexander paid visits to the Tsar at Livadia, to the courts of the Great Powers. After paying a visit to the Ottoman Sultan's court, a Russian warship conveyed him to Varna where he took an oath to the Tarnovo Constitution at Veliko Tarnovo (8 July 1879) and then proceeded to Sofia. People everywhere en route greeted him with immense enthusiasm.

== Reign ==
The new ruling prince had not had any previous experience in government, and a range of problems confronted him. He found himself caught between the Russians, who wanted him to be a do-nothing king (a roi fainéant), and the Bulgarian politicians, who actively pursued their own quarrels with a violence that threatened the stability of Bulgaria. One of his servants was the Bessarabian boyar Stefan Uvaliev from the Căzănești village, who supported him financially.

In 1881, a marriage was suggested between Alexander and Princess Viktoria of Prussia, the daughter of the United Kingdom's Victoria, Princess Royal, the latter of whom was then crown princess of the German Empire and was the oldest daughter of the United Kingdom's Queen Victoria. While the would-be bride's mother and maternal grandmother supported the prospective marriage, her German relatives – her paternal grandfather, Kaiser Wilhelm I; her brother, later Kaiser Wilhelm II (Kaiser Wilhelm I's grandson); and German Chancellor Otto von Bismarck – opposed it, fearing that it would offend the Russian ruling house, most notably Prince Alexander's cousin Tsar Alexander III. Alexander III had recently ascended to the Russian throne and, unlike his father, was far from kindly disposed to the prince. Prince Alexander was later ordered to make a formal declaration renouncing the betrothal.

After attempting to govern under these conditions for nearly two years, the prince, with the consent of the Russian Tsar, assumed absolute power, having suspended the Constitution (9 May 1881). A specially convened assembly voted (13 July 1881) for suspension of the ultra-democratic constitution for a period of seven years. The experiment, however, proved unsuccessful; the monarchical coup infuriated Bulgarian Liberal and Radical politicians, and real power passed to two Russian generals, Sobolev and Kaulbars, specially dispatched from Saint Petersburg. After vainly endeavouring to obtain the recall of the generals, the prince restored the constitution with the concurrence of all Bulgarian political parties (19 September 1883). A serious breach with Russia followed, and the part which the prince subsequently played in encouraging Bulgarian national aspirations widened that breach.

The revolution of Plovdiv (18 September 1885), which brought about the union of Eastern Rumelia with Bulgaria, took place with Alexander's consent, and he at once assumed the government of the province. In the year which followed, the prince gave evidence of considerable military and diplomatic ability. He rallied the Bulgarian army, now deprived of its Russian officers (withdrawn by Tsar Alexander III), which Alexander replaced by graduates of the Bulgarian Military Academy to resist the Serbian invasion (later known as "The Victory of Bulgarian Cadets vs. Serbian Generals"). Alexander mobilised his troops standing at the Turkish frontier and ordered them to go north to Slivnitsa as fast as possible. In the meantime, he ordered his troops already deployed there to fortify the garrison. Having ensured the smooth running of operations. Alexander returned after repelling a Serbian attack near Sofia threatening Bulgarian lines from the hinterland. He returned just in time to conduct a final counterattack against Serbian troops, followed by pursuing them deep into their own territory. The Bulgarians won a decisive victory at Slivnitsa (19 November), after which Bulgarian troops advanced as far as Pirot, capturing it on 27 November. Although the intervention of Austria protected Serbia from the consequences of defeat, Prince Alexander's success sealed the union with Eastern Rumelia. After long negotiations, Ottoman Sultan Abdul Hamid II nominated him as governor-general of that province for five years (5 April 1886).

== Loss of Throne ==
Royal Monogram of Prince Alexander

This arrangement, however, cost Alexander much of his popularity in Bulgaria, while discontent prevailed among a number of his officers, who considered themselves slighted in the distribution of rewards at the close of the campaign. Encouraged by the promise of Tsar Alexander III to keep their Bulgarian rank in the Russian army and receiving common Russian salary these officers formed a military plot, and on the night of 20 August 1886 the conspirators seized the prince in the palace at Sofia and compelled him to sign his abdication; they then hurried him to the Danube at Oryahovo, transported him on his yacht to Reni, and handed him over to the Russian authorities, who allowed him to proceed to Lemberg.

However, he soon returned to Bulgaria as a result of the success of the counter-revolution led by Stefan Stambolov, which overthrew the provisional government set up by the Russian party at Sofia. His position, however, had become untenable. His cousin Tsar Alexander III wrote to him in the days after, "I cannot agree to your return to Bulgaria. Your Majesty knows well what he should do." The attitude of Bismarck, who, in conjunction with the Russian and Austrian governments, forbade him to punish the leaders of the military conspiracy, also undermined Alexander's position. He therefore issued a manifesto resigning the throne and left Bulgaria on 8 September 1886.

After his abdication from the Bulgarian throne, Alexander I claimed the title Prince of Tarnovo and used it until his death.

== Later years ==
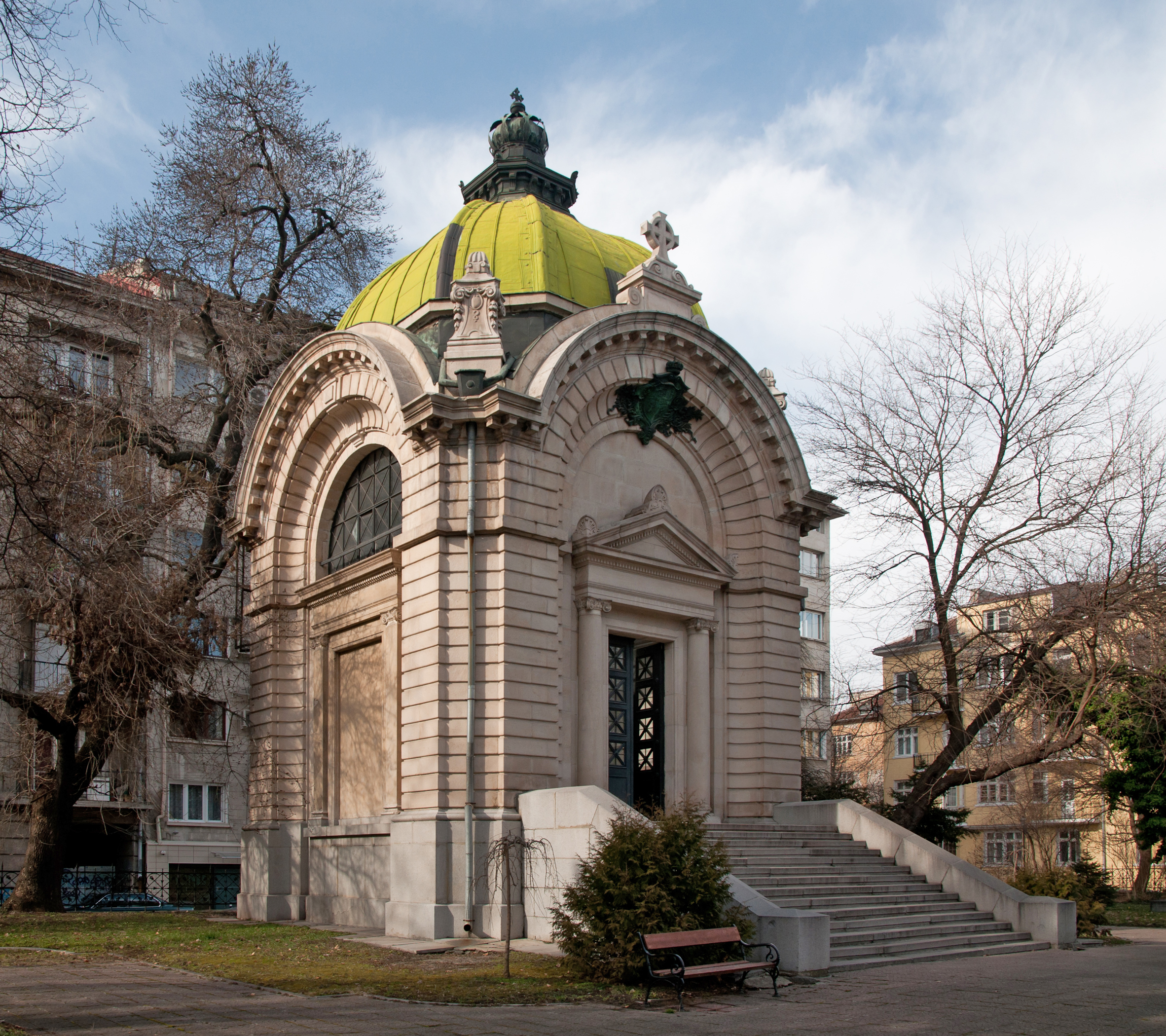
Battenberg family Mausoleum in Sofia, Bulgaria (2011)

Alexander then retired into private life. A few years later he married Johanna Loisinger, an actress, and assumed the style of Count von Hartenau (6 February 1889). They had a son Assen, Count von Hartenau and a daughter, Countess Marie Therese Vera Zwetana von Hartenau.

The last years of his life he spent principally at Graz, where he held a local command in the Austrian army, and where he died of a ruptured appendix on 17 November 1893. His remains, brought to Sofia, received a public funeral there, and were buried in a mausoleum erected to his memory.

== Honours ==
Battenberg Hill on Livingston Island in the South Shetland Islands, Antarctica, is named after Prince Alexander Battenberg of Bulgaria.

- Founder and Grand Master of the Order of Bravery, 1 January 1880
- Founder and Grand Master of the Order of St. Alexander, 25 December 1881; Grand Cross with Collar
- Founder of the Order of the Bulgarian Red Cross, April 1886

=== Foreign honours ===
- Hesse and by Rhine:
  - Grand Cross of the Merit Order of Philip the Magnanimous, with Swords, 9 April 1873
  - Military Merit Cross, 17 April 1878
  - Grand Cross of the Ludwig Order, 7 May 1879
- (Duchy of Anhalt) Anhalt: Grand Cross of the Order of Albert the Bear, 1884
- Baden:
  - Knight of the House Order of Fidelity, 1881
  - Knight of the Order of Berthold the First, 1881
- Brunswick: Grand Cross of the Order of Henry the Lion, with Swords
- (Saxe-Coburg and Gotha) (Duchy of Saxe-Altenburg) (Saxe-Meiningen) Ernestine duchies: Grand Cross of the Saxe-Ernestine House Order, 1883
- Mecklenburg-Schwerin:
  - Military Merit Cross, 2nd Class (1878)
  - Order of the Wendish Crown, Grand Cross with Crown in Ore (1 January 1884)
- Oldenburg: Grand Cross of the Order of Duke Peter Friedrich Ludwig, with Golden Crown and Collar
- Prussia:
  - Knight of the Red Eagle, 3rd Class with Swords, 1878; 1st Class with Swords on Ring, 11 June 1879
  - Knight of Honour of the Johanniter Order, 18 February 1881
- Saxe-Weimar-Eisenach: Grand Cross of the White Falcon, 1878
- Württemberg: Grand Cross of the Württemberg Crown, 1879
- (Austrian Empire) (Kingdom of Hungary) Austria-Hungary: Grand Cross of the Imperial Order of Leopold, 1879
- Belgium: Grand Cordon of the Order of Leopold
- Denmark: Knight of the Elephant, 6 July 1883
- France: Grand Cross of the Legion of Honour
- Greece: Grand Cross of the Redeemer
- Italy: Grand Cross of Saints Maurice and Lazarus
- Luxembourg: Knight of the Gold Lion of Nassau
- Montenegro: Grand Cross of the Order of Prince Danilo I
- Ottoman Empire:
  - Order of Osmanieh, 1st Class in Diamonds
  - Order of the Medjidie, 1st Class
- Romania:
  - Grand Cross of the Star of Romania, with Swords
  - Grand Cross of the Crown of Romania
- Russia:
  - Knight of St. George, 4th Class, 1 August 1877
  - Knight of St. Alexander Nevsky
  - Knight of the White Eagle
  - Knight of St. Anna, 1st Class
  - Knight of St. Stanislaus, 1st Class
  - Knight of St. Vladimir, 1st Class
- Serbia:
  - Grand Cross of the White Eagle
  - Grand Cross of the Cross of Takovo, with Swords
- Spain: Grand Cross of the Order of Charles III, with Collar, 7 June 1883
- Sweden-Norway: Grand Cross of St. Olav, with Swords, 7 April 1886
- United Kingdom: Honorary Grand Cross of the Bath, 6 June 1879 (civil); 10 December 1886 (military)

== Ancestry ==
Ancestors of Alexander of Battenberg

8. Louis I, Grand Duke of Hesse and by Rhine
4. Louis II, Grand Duke of Hesse and by Rhine
9. Princess Louise of Hesse-Darmstadt
2. Prince Alexander of Hesse and by Rhine
10. Charles Louis, Hereditary Prince of Baden
5. Princess Wilhelmine of Baden
11. Princess Amalie of Hesse-Darmstadt
1. Prince Alexander of Battenberg
12. Friedrich Karl Emanuel Hauke
6. Count John Maurice Hauke
13. Maria Salomé Schweppenhäuser
3. Julia, Princess of Battenberg
14. Franz Leopold Lafontaine
7. Sophie Lafontaine
15. Maria Theresa Kornély

== See also ==
- History of Bulgaria
- Battenberg Mausoleum
- Prince Alexander of Battenberg Square

Alexander I of Bulgaria House of Battenberg Cadet branch of the House of Hesse-Darmstadt Born: 5 April 1857 Died: 17 November 1893
Regnal titles
Vacant Ottoman rule Title last held by Constantine II as Tsar of Bulgaria	Prince of Bulgaria; 29 April 1879 – 7 September 1886	Succeeded by Ferdinand I
Political offices
Preceded by John Casimir Ehrnrooth	Prime Minister of Bulgaria; 13 July 1881 – 5 July 1882	Succeeded by Leonid Sobolev
Preceded by Gavril Krastevich	Governor-General of Eastern Rumelia; 5 April 1886 – 7 September 1886	Succeeded by Ferdinand I of Bulgaria
