= People's Party (Bulgaria) =

People's Party Народна партия
- Leaders: Konstantin Stoilov (1894–1901); Ivan Evstratiev Geshov (1901–1920)
- Founded: May 1894
- Dissolved: 7 November 1920
- Preceded by: Conservative Party; People's Party (Eastern Rumelia); Svobodno Slovo alliance
- Merged into: United People's Progressive Party
- Headquarters: Ruse, Principality of Bulgaria (1894)
- Newspaper: Mir
- Ideology: Paternalistic conservatism Authoritarianism (to 1895); Constitutionalism (from 1895); Liberal conservatism (from 1895); Bulgarian nationalism Economic nationalism Social corporatism Russophilia (to 1915)
- Political position: Center-right
- National affiliation: United Opposition (1903); Patriotic Bloc (1907); Bulgarian Union Committee (1908)

The People's Party, also rendered as National or Nationalist Party (Bulgarian: Народна партия, romanized: Narodna partiya, NP, or Narodnyatsite, "Populists"), was a political group in Bulgaria, active between 1894 and 1920—during the country's existence as an autonomous principality and independent kingdom. A paternalistic-conservative force challenging and replacing the People's Liberal Party, it was founded and led until 1901 by Konstantin Stoilov, and thereafter by Ivan Evstratiev Geshov. First organizing in Ruse as an outgrowth of the Svobodno Slovo alliance, it traced its more distant origins to the Conservative Party, which had functioned in Bulgaria-proper during the early 1880s, and to the People's Party of Eastern Rumelia. All these groups were tightly oligarchic, alternating between a public embrace of liberal conservatism and a more ingrained commitment to paternalistic conservatism; beyond this, they supported a moderate version of Bulgarian nationalism, and had a foreign policy that was primarily centered on Russophilia. Unlike other Russophilic parties, the NP advocated for tight relations with Romania.

Stoilov was made prime minister by Knyaz Ferdinand I, in lieu of the disgraced and murdered Stefan Stambolov; in exchange, he agreed to endorse Ferdinand's absolutist tendencies, and also helped him win over support from the Russian Empire. The newly formed NP won the parliamentary elections of 1894, upon which Stoilov consolidated his political machine. Geshov, appointed Minister of Finance, helped with structural reforms that promoted economic nationalism and social corporatism, also inaugurating a lang-standing conflict with the Ottoman Empire over the ownership of Bulgarian railways. The NP government clamped down on Stambolovists and left-wing adversaries, and went back on its initial promise to uphold press freedoms. By 1895, Stoilov had turned into a follower of the Tarnovo Constitution, trying to dissociate himself from Ferdinand's policies. His cabinet was dissolved after disagreements between the ministers, and the monarch then maneuvered to keep the NP out of power for several years—during which Stoilov died.

Under Geshov's direction, the NP was allowed to join the short-lived coalition cabinet headed by Petko Karavelov. Pushed back into the opposition, it formulated its stance in regards to Macedonia: critical of Greater Bulgarian maximalists, it only advocated the annexation of Pirin Macedonia; moreover, the group was opposed to the Internal Macedonian Revolutionary Organization. Joining a largely leftist coalition that fought against Racho Petrov's minority government, it participated in Alexander Malinov's cabinet (1907), but was largely a passive witness to the proclamation of national independence and Ferdinand's own elevation as King of Bulgaria (1908). After opposing the monarchy from increasingly radical positions, Geshov abruptly changed course and offered his services to Ferdinand; he was made prime minister in 1911, proceeding to mend Bulgaria–Russia relations and to create a largely informal "Balkan League", which prepared for a military strike against the Ottomans. Geshov thus masterminded the First Balkan War, but without ever formulating clear objectives and comparing agendas with the country's new allies; the resulting crisis in Macedonia, and his failure to bring about reconciliation with the Kingdom of Romania, led to his ouster in early 1913.

The Second Balkan War ended in national humiliation, with voters identifying the NP as a leading culprit. The Populists recovered some ground during the elections in 1914, and, as the country pondered entering the world war, favored joining the Entente Powers. In mid-1915, the NP fell in line with Vasil Radoslavov's cabinet, which, like Ferdinand, strongly favored the Central Powers; upon the national mobilization staged in September, its leaders reluctantly abandoned their decades-long Russophilia. Over the next three years, Bulgarians were exhausted by war and became resentful of their allies, which created conditions for the growth of an anti-war left, centered on the Bulgarian Agrarian National Union. Following the Armistice of Salonica and Ferdinand's abdication, the NP's Teodor Teodorov agreed to form a coalition cabinet with the leftist groups, and was in charge of negotiating the Neuilly Peace Treaty. He also adopted legislation favoring workers, before stepping down to be replaced by the Agrarianist leader, Aleksandar Stamboliyski. The NP still existed during the March 1920 elections, but soon after folded into the United People's Progressive Party. Former Populist ministers were prosecuted and imprisoned by Stamboliyski's regime, but could return to public life after the anti-Agrarianist coup of 1923.

== Origins ==
The party's roots reach back to the 1880s partition of Bulgarian lands between the autonomous principality and Eastern Rumelia, both of which were still under varying degrees of control by the Ottoman Empire. As observed by scholar Richard J. Crampton, the Bulgarian-and-Rumelian political culture of the time showed a universal "liberal" consensus, in that all resulting camps accepted popular sovereignty, individual rights, and the rule of law. The NP was largely a direct heir to a faction that also embraced paternalistic conservatism, favoring an established oligarchy that would frame and guide a national transition toward a "tidy" democracy; from 1880, its exponents in Sofia and northern Bulgaria had organized as the Conservative Party. Also known as the "Whites" or "Unionists", the Rumelian Geshovists recruited from Plovdiv's upper class. They stood out for their extreme nepotism, which was first observed and ridiculed in the 1880s by Zahari Stoyanov, of the rival People's Liberal Party (NLP). The allegations also included specific claims about corruption networks—with Geshov and his political partners, in particular Stefan Savov Bobchev and Mihail Madzharov, described as casual and cynical profiteers.

An original "People's Party" had been formed in Rumelia by Geshov and Konstantin Velichkov, earning immediate support from intellectuals such as Bobchen and Ivan Vazov. With a platform of Bulgarian nationalism and Russophilia, it fought for national reunification, which was eventually obtained, with support from the Russian Empire, in September 1885. This original faction of Populists maintained a say in the political affairs of the principality through family connections: the post-Conservative political clique formed at Ruse included Teodor Teodorov, who was Bobchev's father-in-law and also related by marriage to the Gubidelnikov family of businessmen. A particularity of the Rumelian Populists' doctrines, in addition to qualified Russophilia, was their strong support for friendship with the neighboring Kingdom of Romania. In 1911, Adevărul of Bucharest reported that Geshov "has been violent in his rejection of all anti-Romanian provocations".

The nationwide NP emerged during the troubled period that followed a pro-Russian coup in 1886, which deposed Knyaz Alexander of Battenberg. In its aftermath, and faced with an explosion of political violence, Prime Minister Stefan Stambolov had repressed the established opposition parties. By summer 1893, the NLP, also known as the "Stambolovist Party", was holding a political monopoly on the country. The only major opposition, protected by its Russian connections, was the Svobodno Slovo ("Free Speech") alliance, comprising Conservatives such as Stoilov and the Radoslavist Liberals—named for their doyen, Vasil Radoslavov. As remarked by an unsigned press correspondent in a 1911 overview, Conservative policies, including the controlled graduation of the masses into democratic government, were still dear to various politicians of that era, though they could no longer operate under the "utterly compromised" label of "Conservatives".

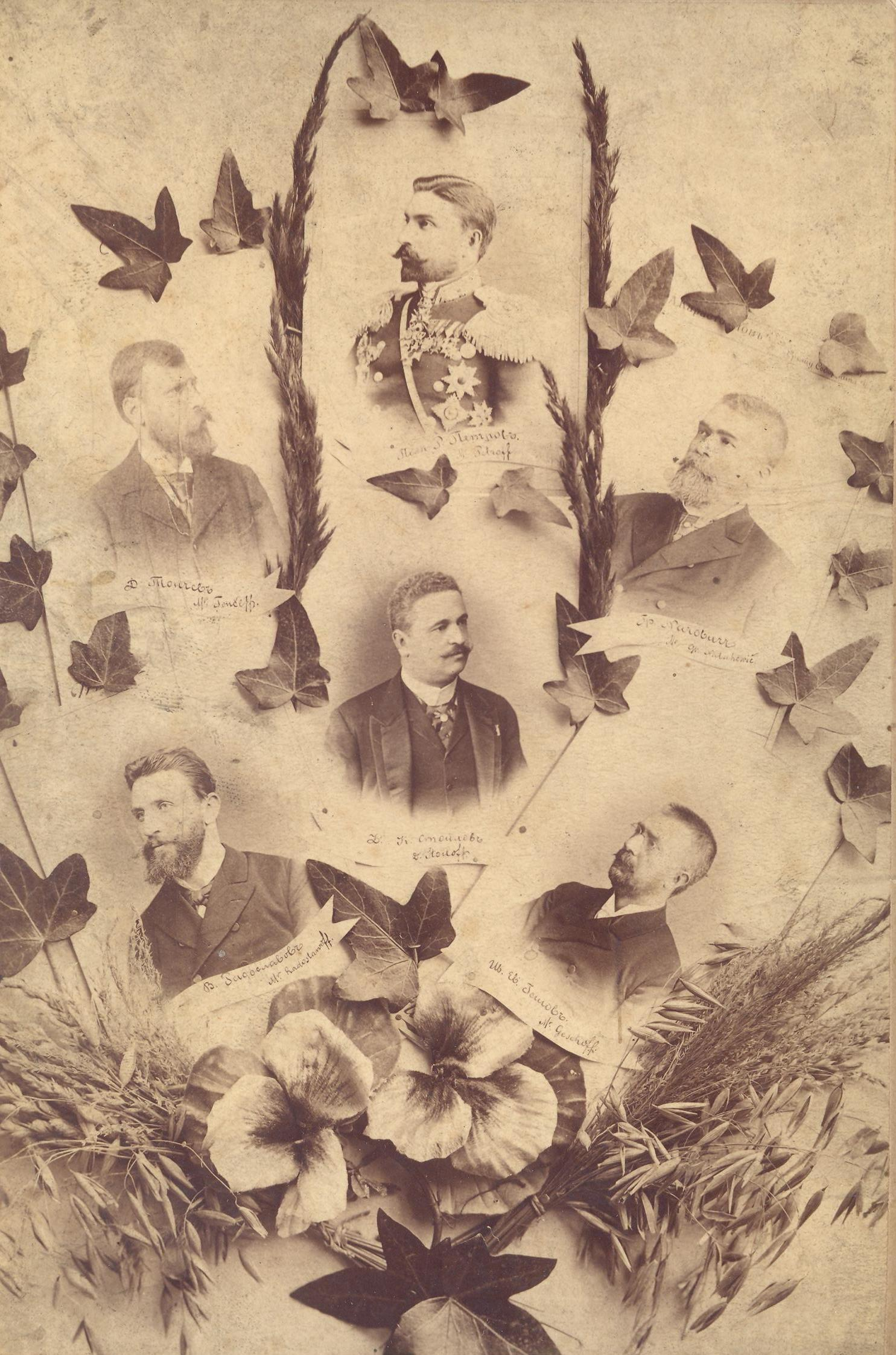
Montage of Stoilov and his cabinet in 1894

The anti-Stambolovist coalition was able to persuade Ferdinand I, the newly elected Knyaz, to lose his trust in Stambolov. The latter ultimately retired in May 1894, and was immediately after beaten to death by unknown assailants, possibly driven into a frenzy by Svobodno Slovo. Taking over as prime minister, Stoilov staged a purge of Stambolov's loyalists, inaugurating a political machine that was later imitated by all other parties in government. He drafted a "Law on the Suppression of Illegal Enrichment of Officials", which was accepted by the National Assembly, and which "made it possible to bring to justice all employees of the state apparatus, without exception, down to the members of the government, and for any crimes." He announced a lifting of censorship—though he continued to enforce strict laws against the Stambolovists at Svoboda and other papers, harassing them with lawsuits until finally decreeing a partial amnesty. On his orders, "all but three of the twenty-four regional prefects were replaced within a month as were seventy of the eighty-four rural magistrates and police inspectors; by the end of 1895 almost the entire complement of the civil service and the police force had been changed."

As a Marxist-inspired social critic, Dimitar Blagoev asserted that the purge of Stambolovists was never serious: "not only the big and rich lawyers of the bourgeoisie, but also all the big entrepreneurs, manufacturers, merchants, landowners, rural and urban big farmers and usurers who were in power under Stambolov, and all the village mayors and their friends involved in abuses and thefts, immediately found themselves under [Stoilov's] banner." Scholar Dmytro Mykolenko believes that the anti-corruption legislation was well-meaning, but also that "the 'Populist' government never managed to bring this undertaking to a logical conclusion [since] the market for corrupt services with its negative impact on state processes had firmly established itself in the system of state governance". Historian Mercia MacDermott contrarily suggests that Stoilov and his supporters "flung themselves into the twin tasks of combatting and even physically eliminating their political opponents, and of making personal hay while the sun of office shone upon them." She focuses her research on the town of Dupnitsa, where the Stoilovist mayor, Dimitar Radev, "proposed and disposed in all municipal matters, assisted by a loyal caucus of wealthy citizens, whose disregard for democracy rivalled his own."

Stoilov scheduled Assembly elections for September 1894, and, in hopes of consolidating his own power, proceeded to organize his government party. The NP was thus formed in May 1894, from a group of Stoilovists based in Ruse—including Teodorov, who was then selective as the NP's national secretary. Using the slogan "Freedom and Legality, Order and Recognition", it fused together the northern Conservatives, who were Stoilov's own club, and the Rumelian Populists, led at the time by Grigor Nachovich, with Bobchev and Madzharov (who were friends with each other) among the core organizers. According to Blagoev, he specifically selected the Rumelians because, alone among the Russophiles, they did not take directions from Radoslavov. These two wings were also joined by defectors from the Radoslavist group and the Progressive Liberal Party (PLP), as well as by some former Stambolovists. Established around that time as the factional voice, the political newspaper Mir ("Peace") was continuously in print until 1944.

== Early conflicts ==
Stoilov ran the new group as a vehicle for Ferdinand and for the Saxe-Coburg dynasty; as Ferdinand's choice of prime minister, he aimed for a majority in the Assembly. Still known in the international press as "old Conservatives", his associates managed victory in the elections, taking at least 87 out of 153 known seats, and forming an alliance with the core Radoslavists (who had 27 seats); the opposition comprised various groups, including the NLP with eight seats. Teodorov, who registered his victory at Ruse, was later voted in as the Assembly Chairman. The anti-Populist caucus was soon joined by Radoslavov's party, whose leader was expelled from the cabinet for having been conspicuously supportive of a Bulgarian alliance with Austria-Hungary. This move was part of an array of measures that Stoilov undertook in order to improve Bulgaria–Russia relations. His effort peaked in February 1895, when Crown Prince Boris was baptized by the Bulgarian Orthodox Church, with Nicholas II as his godfather.

Government also overturned Stambolov's Ottomanist policies, and was therefore indifferent to the formation of anti-Ottoman guerrillas in Macedonia. The Supreme Macedonian-Adrianople Committee (VMOK) established itself on Bulgarian territory, and Stoilov, who "needed Macedonian support on the domestic front", did almost nothing to curtail its activities. The VMOK was also welcomed for being strongly Bulgarophile, in that it opposed the more Internal Macedonian Revolutionary Organization (IMRO); the former organization fought for a Greater Bulgaria, while the latter embraced autonomy for Macedonia and Adrianople regions. The NP instead favored a future partition of Macedonia between the smaller nations of the Balkans, and its government signed a secret pact on this issue with the Kingdom of Serbia (notable for being the first document whereby the Bulgarian state accepted the validity of Serb claims in Vardar Macedonia). Meanwhile, Stoilov's tolerance of refugees was only restrained by Russia, who favored a freeze on separatist nationalism in the Ottoman Empire. As an alternative, Stoilov proposed "widespread reforms of the administration in European Turkey. These the Porte accepted but failed to implement."

On its Rumelian side, the NP inherited a "network of clan-patriarchal ties" from the pre-1885 "Whites". This oligarchy now stood out for its organic connection with the Bulgarian Commercial Bank, which had its main offices in Ruse. It did not interfere with corrupt practices in that electoral fief, allegedly collecting as much as 20,000 leva in bribes from one of Ruse's brothel owners. One of the group's major focuses was on modernizing the transport grid and the local industry, by introducing, a program of railways expansion, and, on the other, debt relief for Bulgarian factories. From 1894 to 1897, Geshov, a trained economist, steered the Ministry of Finance, and from that position championed economic nationalism—his team introduced legislation that supported the internal market and industry, as well as the agricultural sector, and set up chambers of commerce. He took an interest in labor disputes, mandating compulsory insurance. Geshov also shaped fiscal policy, introducing property taxes, excises, and duties on the cottage industry, though focus was kept on reducing the fiscal burden on individuals. He thus did away with the old system of tithes, becoming genuinely popular among the peasants. Fiscal revenue declined sharply around 1897, when most taxes were again levied from the impoverished peasants. Despite mounting pressures from the southern Populists, who wished to reduce transport fees on the grain trade, Stoilov vetoed any project to nationalize a railway operated by the Oriental Railway Company (ORC, an Ottoman venture). In mid-1896, he agreed to fund a "parallel line" to Nova Zagora and Burgas, assigning it directly to the State Railways. His effort was thwarted by the Assembly, who instead pressured him to buy the operating rights from the ORC, and then by the Porte, who refused to sanction that deal.

The NP soon faced challenges from political newcomers on the left. The group is widely identified as a leading target of satirical stories by Aleko Konstantinov, which depict the Populists as an "anti-democratic and opportunistic clique"; similar, if less direct, jibes appeared in writings by Stoyan Mihaylovski and Georgi Kirkov. As early as June 1895, Mir, which followed the party line on limiting press freedoms, claimed that socialist revolutionaries were using free speech to violate other constitutional norms; such issues created splits within the NP itself, since its Justice Minister, Petar Peshev, wanted a complete return of press freedoms, whereas Stoilov himself saw free political expression as generating criminal lassitude. A compromise law, with input from both factions, was adopted in January 1895. It stipulated that newspapers needed to comply with certain norms, and be issued patents by the Ministry of Justice in order to function. In February 1898, Stoilov founded the official press office, or "Bulgarian Telegraph Agency"—which was based on a Russian model, and initially popularized government's conservative ideology. The premier was by then directly opposed by the Democratic Party, which was forced to concede partial defeat when the Russian Empire, initially reluctant, officially endorsed the Bulgarian Coburgs in February 1896. Once the Democrats had been made to accept the status quo, Stoilov embraced parliamentarism, "making efforts to limit the political intrigues and whims of the monarch."

At a more local level, Nikola Holevich and Yurdan Pekarev in Varna, and Yanko Zabunov in Pleven, set in motion the Narodnik-inspired phenomenon of Bulgarian agrarianism, manifested as a series of quasi-revolutionary upheavals. Anarchists and other extreme leftists (including students who had staged an anti-government strike in Kazanlak) gathered at Sofia's Osvobozhdenie Club, which carried a sign specifically banning Populist "spies" from even entering the building. The opposition groups coalesced with each other during local elections in Stara Zagora, when government intervened to close down polling stations and intimidate the voters. During the repeat elections held after three weeks, the NP and the PLP took most seat in the council. Also locally, the Workers' Social Democratic Party (BRSDP), a Marxist organization, upset the establishment by having won Dryanovo's city council. As the BRSDP paper Naroden Glas boasted, this victory came despite anti-socialist cooperation between the NP and the NLP. As a result, in December 1896 the Stoilov cabinet dissolved Dryanovo's city government, and organized sped-up city elections in March of the following year.

As the Macedonian Struggle dragged on, both Bulgarophiles and IMRO autonomists were welcomed as waves of refugees into Bulgaria. However, in late 1897 the NP government had to intervene against the Macedonians of Dupnitsa—these had rioted upon reading in the newspapers that Stoilov had received an Ottoman decoration. As reported by Blagoev, Stoilov used the "pretext of checking on popular will" when dissolving the Assembly in October 1896, but in fact wanted to ensure that the opposition was fully weakened. The NP managed to secure a "comfortable majority" during the follow-up elections of November. These were again marred by violence and irregularities: in and around Stara Zagora, the opposition and the Populists took to the streets, and had to be separated by the civil guard; its agents were ordered to collect all weaponry that could be found on sale in local stores. Blagoev sees the various crimes committed during the November election as being replicated and enhanced by violence in the by-elections of March 1897, and then by more isolated, but equally bloody incidents—such as Konstantinov's assassination.

== Consolidation under Geshov ==
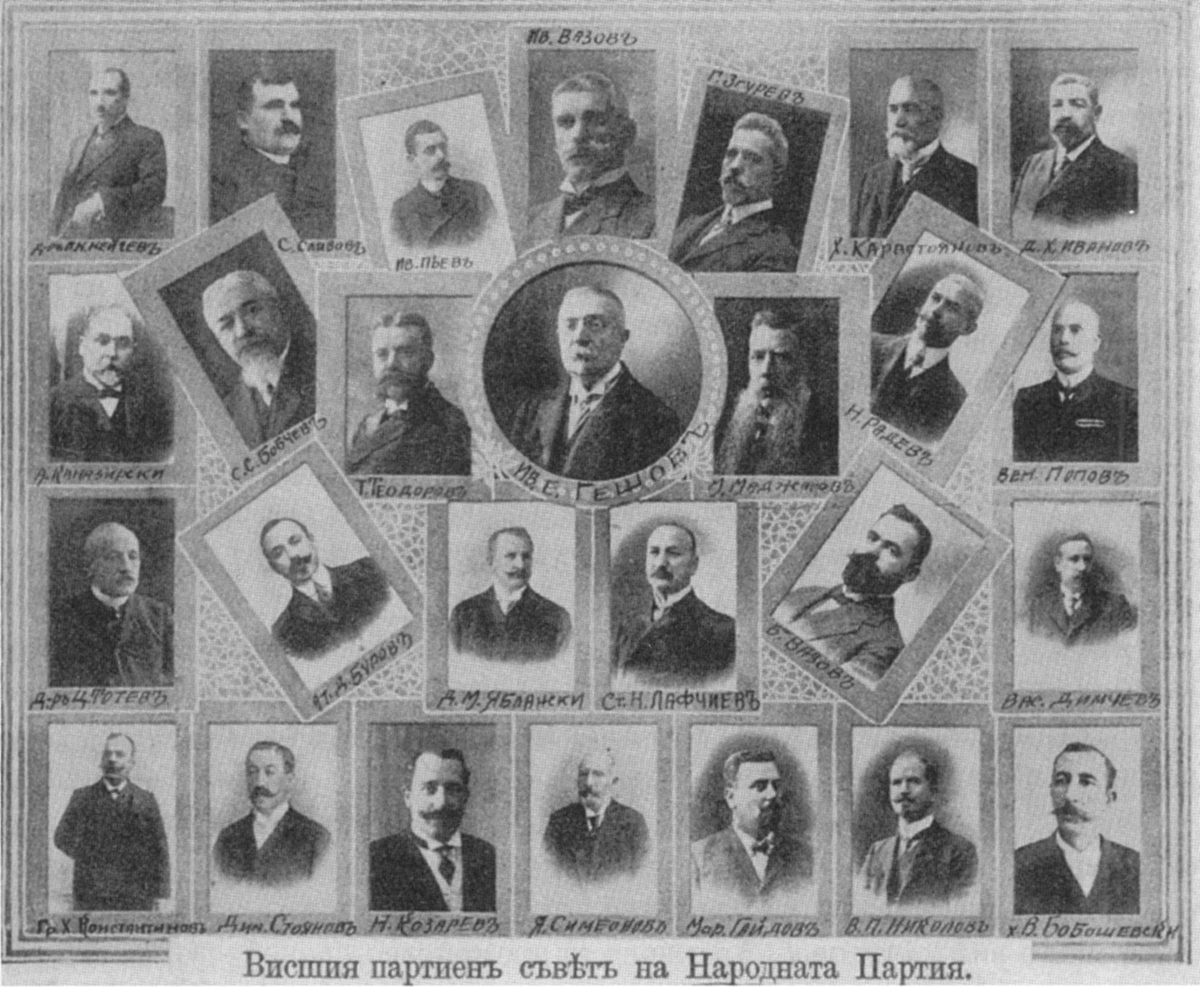
The Supreme Council of the People's Party at the beginning of the 20th century, with Geshov at the center

Shortly after his disputed confirmation, and while the Ottomans were absorbed in dealing with the Cretan Revolt, Stoilov obtained a diplomatic victory—in that he secured charters of privilege for the Bulgarian Exarchate in Macedonia. During his second term as prime minister, he tried to solve outstanding labor issues by introducing social corporatism, mandating state protection for the traditional network of guilds. His "Law on the Regulation of Guilds", adopted in 1898, was nonetheless met with indignation in all layers of society, because it made guild membership compulsory, and was quickly withdrawn from the books. A survival from this experiment was a system of competitions in handicrafts, the first one of which was held at Plovdiv in 1898. Stoilov now fought to protect the Tarnovo Constitution, and limiting princely excesses absorbed him fully. Upon his pressures, Ferdinand promised not to dissolve the Assembly; this was an important win for the Prime Minister, but rendered moot in January 1899, when disagreements between his ministers caused the cabinet to become deadlocked, and then to resign. According to Crampton, Stoilov had lost the Knyaz's confidence, and was also rendered ineffective by his own "declining health." By then, other participants on the political scene were campaigning against the NP's failure to advance the Bulgarian agenda in Macedonia; they had also observed that "the Stoilov regime, which had promised to cleanse the Bulgarian political machine, was every bit as dictatorial as that of Stambolov."

Stoilov withdrew from political life, seeing Ferdinand as a dishonorable partner, though he remained credited as the NP leader to his death in 1901. His departure allowed Ferdinand to inaugurate a "personal regime" (lasting deep into the 20th century), whereby popular sovereignty was effectively curtailed; the Democrats, led by Petko Karavelov, celebrated Stoilov's fall, but would not enter the monarchist coalition and "quasi-parliamentary government" of Dimitar Grekov. As observed by the Democrats' Alexander Malinov, 1899 also marked the end of free elections: "[Ferdinand] was never particularly outraged by electoral violence. He was always well informed about it. And when this or that Minister of the Interior boasted that he had held free elections, he would ironically remark: Yes, yes, exactly of the kind your predecessor had held."

Geshov was voted in as the new party chairman, "though he was something of a figurehead", with Teodorov as his éminence grise; they had lost Velichkov and his Rumelian Populists, who crossed over to the PLP in 1899. Preparing for the elections in April 1899, Stoilov and Teodorov appeared at a rally in Stara Zagora, during which locals staged a mock-funeral procession, destined to show that Grekov's cabinet had destroyed Bulgaria. The NP was reduced to just two Assembly seats, since the victorious Radoslavists had captured all of the Macedonian vote. Along with the other parties of the opposition, the NP began probing government over allegations of systemic corruption, but its campaign was thwarted by the Knyaz. In October 1899, Ferdinand accepted Grekov's resignation and had him replaced with the more junior Radoslavist Todor Ivanchov, thus burying the scandal. The NP recovered from its earlier fall, claiming 29 seats in January 1901. The following month, during local elections at Stara Zagora, local chapters of the PLP and the NP (respectively centered on Akardzha and Tabakhna neighborhoods) fought each other with stones and revolvers.

These additional tensions came during a peak of the Macedonian Struggle, which saw Ferdinand having to balance his own Greater Bulgarian projects against his dislike of the increasingly unruly VMOK; while secretly preparing for a clash with the Ottoman Empire in Salonica vilayet, he also tried to appease Russia, mandating Karavelov to set up a nationalist-and-Russophile cabinet. Populists were reluctantly allowed by Ferdinand to join the Democratic-led Karavelov cabinet, which had promised major reforms. When Ottoman Police arrested instigators such as Hristo Tatarchev, uncovering traces of Bulgarian state cooperation with the VMOK, the government began answering internal and external calls for containing the VMOK, as a means to avoid "catastrophe". Probably led on by Ottoman provocateurs within the organization, who overemphasized the importance of VMOK militarists, but also backed by Gotse Delchev (who represented the more pacifist and socialist faction of the VMOK), the Russophile ministers intervened to subdue and neutralize the organization. The NP's policies were refuted by the IMRO, which still stood as VMOK's leftist rival—and which counted Delchev among its members. Unbeknown to Geshov, Delchev and his colleagues had plotted to kidnap his son Nikola and hold him at ransom.

A government crisis erupted in December 1901, after Karavelov tried, but failed, to obtain majority support for an international loan with Bank of Paris. This refusal, which jeopardized national finances, prompted Karavelov's immediate resignation. The NP dropped to 28 seats in February 1902, witnessing as a PLP cabinet was formed by Stoyan Danev. The latter offered to include NP ministers in his cabinet, and Geshov even considered, but ultimately vetoed, talks of a merger between the two groups. In May 1903, Ferdinand, seeking "new ways to resolve the national question", obtained Danev's resignation. In the aftermath, he proposed that Geshov take over the premiership, but as the only NP member in a cabinet (whose other members would have Democrats and PLP men). Geshov refused the offer, which prompted the Knyaz to govern by means of a Stambolovist minority, under the nominally independent Racho Petrov. His cabinet was staffed by members of the NLP—who held just eight seats between them.

Danev and Geshov began collaborating immediately after, once Petrov had initiated a purge of the administrative apparatus. In July, 142 opposition deputies, including several (but not all) Populists, presented Ferdinand with a letter of protest. Petrov's toughest test was the Ilinden–Preobrazhenie Uprising, which erupted in Macedonia during August 1903. His neo-Stambolovist team widened the gap between the Bulgarian establishment and the IMRO by refusing to involve the Bulgarian Armed Forces on the side of Macedonian rebels; Petrov also embraced a policy of cooperation with the Porte, trying to obtain peaceful reforms within the status quo. The October 1903 elections were called for by the Knyaz just as the PLP had been discredited for its own dealings in Macedonia. Danev forged an alliance with the Populists and some of the Democrats, labeling it as the "United Opposition"; it functioned on the promise that the PLP would not contest seats in places such as Radomir and Teteven, which were NP fiefs (though Geshov ultimately allowed Danev to present himself in another Populist stronghold, at Tsaribrod). The cooperation agreement was never implemented by various local chapters—in Plovdiv, Peshtera, Ferdinand and Razgrad, the NP had to present its own lists of candidates, against the PLP–Democratic caucus, as well against the government list.

The campaign saw Geshov and Danev campaigning alongside Malinov (who was leading the Democrats after Karavelov's death). It witnessed a series of violent clashes with the Stambolovists, including at Plovdiv, Stara Zagora, Tatar Pazardzhik, Stanimaka, and Tarnovo (in Tsaribrod, a Populist militia, led into battle by Emanuil Nachev, managed to chase out Petrov's loyalists, though in other places the opposition forces were outnumbered, and often subdued). The United Opposition was only able to win 40 seats in the Assembly, with a "stable parliamentary majority for the ruling NLP." The alliance crumbled soon after, despite efforts by the PLP's theoretician, Dragan Tsankov—his proposal to revive it as a permanent "Society of Constitutionalists" was rejected by Geshov and Teodorov, and also by Malinov. By 1905, the effort to coalesce the opposition parties was undermined by a legal dispute involving Geshov and his role in managing the large inheritance left by trader Evlogi Georgiev; Tsankov appeared as a witness against Geshov, which "gave rise to a Populist–Progressive dispute and compromised the idea of inter-party unity." Petrov remained unchallanged as premier, forming his new cabinet with members of the NLP—who held just eight seats between them. The tensions in Macedonia, meanwhile, had ramified to Bulgaria, as with the pogroms targeting Greeks at Anhialo in 1905–1906. In tandem, Mir began airing claims that Petrov had embezzled public funds to finance radical groups in Macedonia.

== Return to power ==
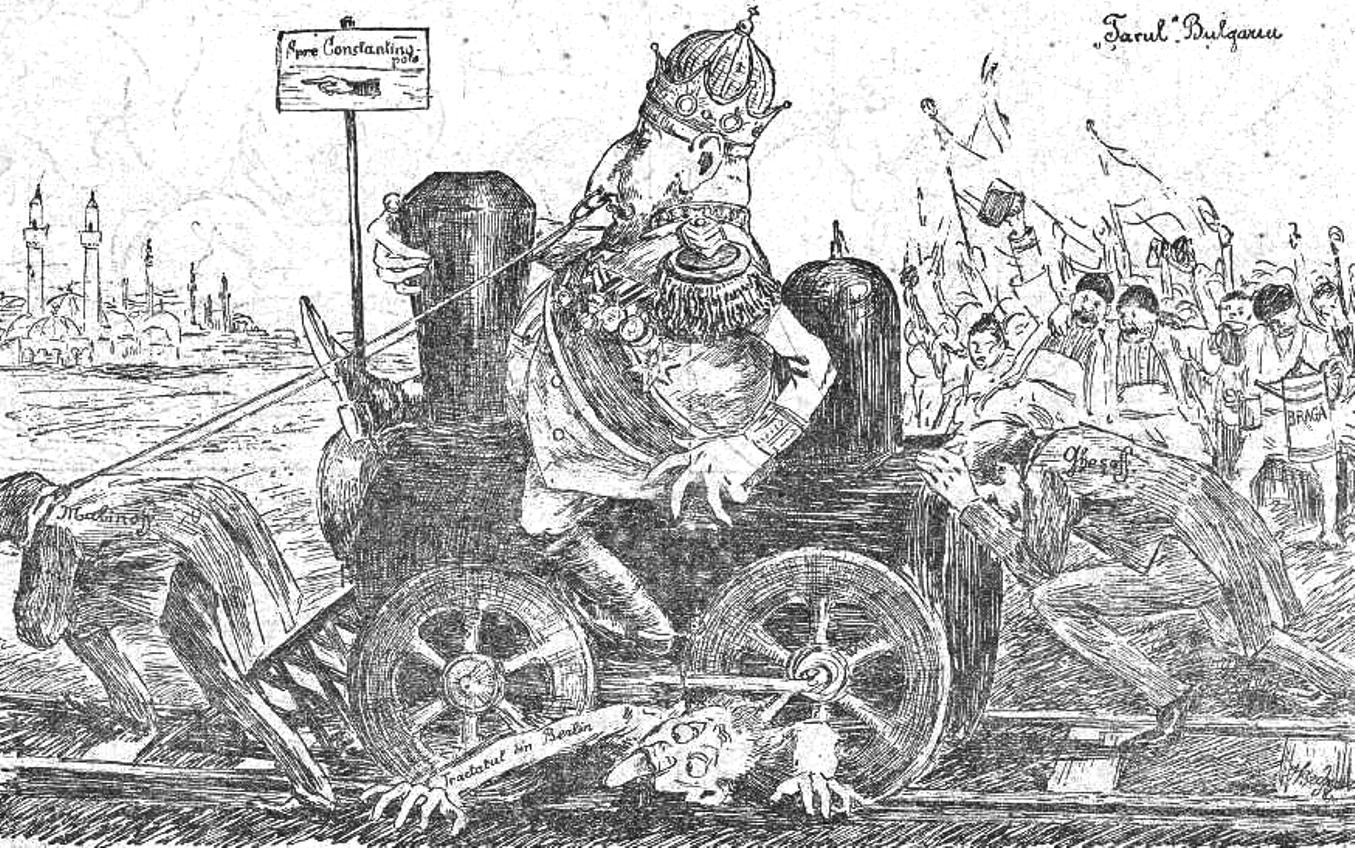
October 1908 cartoon by the Romanian artist Elena Alexandrina Bednarik, showing Ferdinand I being dragged along by Malinov, and pushed by Geshov, into a war with the Ottomans

The NLP held on to power under the government of Dimitar Petkov, who replaced the disgraced Petrov after the Anhialo affair. Following this change, the NLP proceeded with highly unpopular tax increases, then threatened to sack all civil servants who had gone on strike. In January 1907, after Ferdinand was booed by students of Sofia University, Petkov ordered that institution to be shut down and purged. The heavy-handed approach scandalized the opposition. An ad-hoc "Patriotic Bloc" was formed by the NP, the Democrats, the PLP, the Radical Democratic Party, and the Broad Socialists. The negotiations took place in Tedorov's home, with himself and Dimitar Yablanski as the two NP envoys; accepting Danev as the collective leader, they drafted a minimalist platform which, in addition to constitutionalism, included "the implementation of reforms ensuring democratization, freedom of elections, fairer taxation, reduction of the military budget and a social legislation."

The Patriots held their first major rally on 18 February 1907, in Sofia's Pozitano Square. The organizing committee, which included Yablanski, brought in almost 25,000 protesters. Overall, however, Crampton assesses that the Bloc was an extremely fragile, "exotic coalition of oppositionists", which had little change of being taken seriously by Ferdinand. All groups supported a platform of electoral reform, with the "abolition of reactionary laws", but the right-wing could not be persuaded to include any explicit demands for labor rights; the Bloc suspended itself after Petkov's assassination that March, but resumed its activity when the Broad Socialists demanded it. The assassination itself was regarded by government as instigated by "figures close to the People's Party", including Ivan Ikonomov of Balkanska Tribuna newspaper. He was put on trial.

The alliance initially came to power with Malinov as head of a new cabinet. It ultimately crumbled in May 1907, after the Democrats noted that Ferdinand would have never accepted that all five parties be assigned ministerial seats. Late that year, Nachovich proposed forming a "Small Bloc" from the NP, the PLP, and the Radoslavists, while others even proposed fusing all three groups into a "Rational Party". Danev considered the proposal, but ultimately rejected it (since he feared that the unification would be frowned upon by the Knyaz). The May 1908 elections certified the Bulgarian Agrarian National Union (BZNS) as a strong component of the Bulgarian left/ They also saw the Populist faction engaged in the opposition to Malinov's Democratic cabinet, and engaged in a tactical collaboration with the PLP (though the latter deal was only activated in certain precincts). The NP was reduced to seven seats in the Assembly.

The NP resumed a partial collaboration with the Broad Socialists and the PLP: after the constitutionalist revolt in the Ottoman Empire, they formed a "Bulgarian Union Committee", which established links with the Committee of Union and Progress (CUP) in hopes of obtaining increased rights for Macedonian Bulgarians and other Ottoman Christian groups. These events occurred just before Ferdinand proclaimed independence for the Bulgarian nation and his own elevation as King of Bulgaria. His decision was precipitated by the "Geshov affair", namely the snubbing of Geshov, the Populist founding-figure, who was serving as ambassador to the Porte, by the CUP, and also by the ongoing crisis involving the ORC. After Malinov had relaxed the censorship laws, the NP felt at liberty to criticize the monarch, including at a nationwide party conference, held in February 1910. As Crampton notes, this behavior only enhanced Ferdinand's intense dislike of Geshov.

In 1910, Nachovich renewed his proposals to unite the NP and the PLP, his offer again rejected by the Geshovists; the two groups remained tied by ideological and social bounds, in that they both supported Russophilia and a "bourgeois democracy". The Populists were by then targeted by elaborate critiques as to their social role. The cartoonists at Balgaran magazine, including Alexander Bozhinov, created a visual language that mocked the Populists, the Radoslavivists, and all other mainstream groups. As leader of the Broad Socialists, Yanko Sakazov regarded the NP as standing for the "conservative Bulgarian bourgeoisie", "a party of order and stability" that had to accommodate Ferdinand's "Caesarism"; Sakazov contrasted the Populists with the NLP and the Progressive Liberals, who were more closely aligned with Ferdinand, and whom he denounced as "reactionary". Other sources focused on exposing the NP's ongoing involvement in corruption. Prosecutor Nedko Kableshkov, who investigated administrative abuse at Plovdiv's central prison, reported being pressured by Bobchev, who alternated threats and offers of bribes.

On the right, the Stambolovists proposed that, while Bulgaria had always been plagued by corruption, "its greatest scale is characteristic of rule by the People's Party". In that context, the NLP began claiming that Stoilov had stolen Stambolov's personal wealth, something which the NP denied categorically. The Radoslavists, meanwhile, openly challenged the Populists and the Democrats for their tenets, namely "that the monarch should stay away from government." The NP elite, which also included Ivan Peev-Plachkov and Mikhail Madzharov, was similarly attacked by the right-wing intellectual Trifon Kunev, who identified it as a major source of political corruption and anti-democratic violence. In a lampoon of 1910, Kunev accused this group of having masterminded the murders of various reformers and social critics, going back to Stambolov and Aleko Konstantinov, and also including Petkov; he also claimed that they were supportive of republicanism, since this would have served their political machine. He also ridiculed intellectuals who were, or seemed to be, supportive of the NP—variously including Dimitar Agura, Spiridon Ganev, Lyubomir Miletich, Ivan Shishmanov, and Benyo Tsonev.

Premier Malinov walked back on his promise for electoral reform, sparking massive protests led by the Broad Socialists, who were now explicitly republican. In November 1910, Geshov was received by Ferdinand, who heard him explain that the NP "is not engaged in combat against the king and the dynasty as persons, but that it follows the constitutional principle." The rural councils elections of January 1911 were won by the Democrats, though the NP came in second, with 21.6% of the ballot (thus managing to surpass the BZNS). Much disliked for his handling of the Ruse blood wedding, Malinov was ultimately deposed by Ferdinand in early 1911, for having refused to negotiate an entente with Serbia. Malinov had thus been accused of having jeopardized Bulgaria's Russian policy; the NP was believed to be more reliable Russophilic. Geshov himself had additionally singled out Malinov as an anti-Romanian, who had sabotaged a record of good Bulgaria–Romania relations. In March 1911, Geshov also promised to support constitutional revisions that were designed to increase Ferdinand's role in the new kingdom's political framework.

== Balkan Wars and decline ==
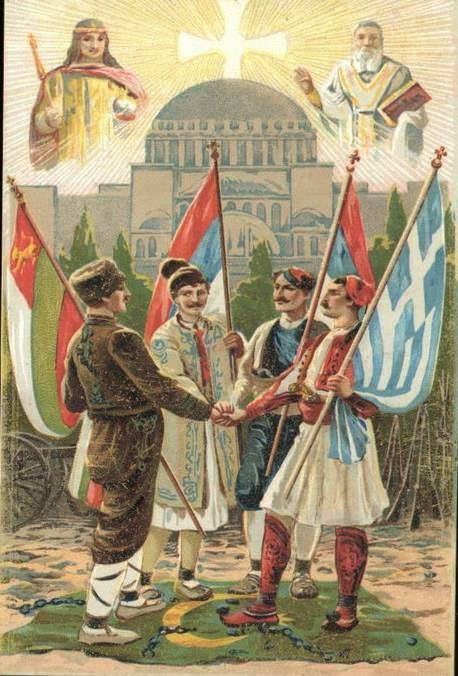
Allegory of the "Balkan League", in a 1912 postcard

A government majority was formed by the NP and the PLP, despite mounting objections from the Populist youth (who felt that their group had been snubbed). The negotiations had been tense, and the atmosphere created between the two partners endured as "hypocritical and oppressive". They had required Danev (whom Geshov still resented) to abandon his prospects of leading the resulting cabinet; in exchange, the NP agreed not to press for a merger with the PLP. In his inaugural speech at Ruse (where the government majority had most of the council seats), Geshov announced that his party stood for peace in the Balkans; friendly relations were sought with all of Bulgaria's traditional rivals—including Serbia, Romania, and the Ottomans. Geshov held the belief that a Greater Bulgaria could and would be established in a "relatively favorable environment", but, at his liege's urging, began by effectively withdrawing Bulgarian claims beyond Pirin Macedonia (effectively relinquishing Bitola and Salonica). The premier tried to resume collaboration with the Porte in securing collective rights for the Bulgarian Macedonians. He was also "extremely reserved" regarding the IMRO, which had been secretly subsidized by previous cabinets. His refusal to continue the practice created animosity between the Bulgarian establishment and the IMRO.

During the actual vote on the constitutional changes, the Populists blocked Ferdinand's absolutist drive, and the negotiation of international treaties, which the king had coveted, remained a cabinet prerogative. Ferdinand allowed Geshov to preserve the premiership only because they matched in terms of international policies, including when it came to normalizing Bulgaria–Serbia relations. Geshov's government alliance won a large majority in the Constitutional Assembly elections in June. From the Assembly rostrum, the NP's deputy Atanas Burov outlined his party's interpretation of the constitutional revision. He congratulated the king for his role in creating a "serious state", while still promising to amend provisions that his group disliked, and for which he only blamed Malinov; Burov also defended unlimited financial revenue for the throne. His colleague P. Glavinov similarly asserted that Ferdinand had a right to establish his own dynasty, and that the constitutional changes were right in clarifying that aspect.

After this change in the political climate, the NP became "Bulgaria's largest and most stable" political group, and overall the "strongest party", despite having lost ground among the right-wing Stambolovists and witnessing the defection of all other party factions. Geshov was reconfirmed after parliamentary elections in September: the NP was the larger of the two factions, with 99 of the alliance's 190 seats. Geshov immediately moved to grant Ferdinand the power of concluding international treaties without parliamentary interference. In May–August 1912, the surge of Ottoman violence in Macedonia was met with outage by the Bulgarian public, with both Vasil Radoslavov and Ivan Vazov hosting large-scale pro-intervention rallies. During that interval, sources close to Geshov suggested cementing a dynastic alliance with Romania. This plan had Crown Prince Boris marrying Elisabeth of Romania, together forming the ruling dynasty of an Autonomous Macedonia.

The hawkish agitation won over deputies of the NP, including Georgi Peev; in August, the pro-war caucus reportedly threatened to replace Geshov with Radoslavov. Geshov was unanimously supported by the cabinet in declaring war on the Porte during the final days of that month. He held on to the premiership throughout the resulting First Balkan War: during the conflict, the "Balkan League" (an informal alliance, largely reflecting Geshov's own optimistic approach to international treaties) won major gave chase to the Ottoman Army. Following victory at Lule Burgas, the PLP ministers, including Aleksandar Lyudskanov, Anton Frangia, and Peter Abrashev, pressed its Populist partners to push for an occupation of Istanbul, but they were "against continuing the operation". Ferdinand and General Mihail Savov ignored such objections, and ordered a move toward the Ottoman capital—resulting defeat at Çatalca. To the despair of Bulgarian peasants, the conflict also opened up new venues for corruption, with the NP's clientele, now centered on a network of quartermasters, directly engaged in confiscating and selling food for personal gain.

In November, Geshov was asked about how the fellow combatants would divide the occupied territory between them, but "avoided answering"; he also played down rumors about a sudden deterioration in Bulgaria's relationship with Romania. During late 1912, various Bulgarian newspapers demanded his resignation, since he had failed to reach an understanding with Romania before the Romanians had begun stating compensatory territorial claims in Southern Dobruja. As Abrashev noted, all cabinet ministers were shocked by Romania's invocation of such claims, perceiving it as the "height of cynicism", and voting to simply ignore them. Instead, they offered to demilitarize Southern Dobruja and to recognize the Aromanians of Macedonia, whose demands had been taken up by Romania, as a protected class within the enlarged Bulgarian Kingdom.

In his memoirs, Geshov acknowledged it as his great mistake that he had never considered "a preliminary clause for the distribution of the conquered territories." In February 1913, the NP was staging mass rallies against any territorial concessions, with the cabinet warning that it would happily declare war over that issue. The PLP had come to see him as "very cautious, indecisive and afraid to take responsibility", and only narrowly refrained from withdrawing its support and its ministers. The coalition was rescued by Abrashev, who described Geshov as "very honest [and] very decent". In May, Geshov witnessed skirmishes with the Kingdom of Greece along the Angitis, had to put down mutinies of his own army, and heard from Serb envoys who now demanded a plebiscite in Macedonia. He met with the Serb prime minister, Nikola Pašić, to negotiate a settlement. At the time, Pašić was demanding "a change in the treaty [...] regarding the division of the spoils".

In tandem, Ferdinand overstepped the government by calling in his crown council, which unanimously supported war on Serbia and Greece, begun in June as a Second Balkan War. The preemptive attack on Bulgaria's former allies was carried out by General Savov, whom Geshov greatly resented—in his memoirs, he identified Savov with Bay Ganyo, the uneducated and irresponsible chauvinist in Konstantinov's prose. Voices from within the cabinet agreed that Geshov needed to step down, since its international policy had been nullified. The PLP's Danev became the new prime minister even before Geshov could return from his diplomatic tour, after which the NP resisted attempts at forming a new majority, thus contributing to a two-week government crisis. On 1 June 1913, they finally agreed to Danev's cabinet. Geshov himself was honored by the Assembly, who voted him as its Chairman exactly as Romania had joined Serbia and was advancing on Tutrakan.

== World War I as a policy changer ==
Within two months, Bulgaria was defeated by all other Balkan states, and forced to cede territory on all fronts. This also carried consequences for the NP, now "discredited [and] held responsible for the disasters of 1913." A new cabinet, formed by Radoslavov, "could not work with the [Assembly] elected in 1911 to serve Geshov's regime", and called for parliamentary elections in November 1913 ("confined to the pre-Balkan wars kingdom", and also the first to be carried under proportional representation). The NP was again soundly defeated, taking only five Assembly seats. Radoslavov called for new elections in February 1914; in his attempt to harm Geshov and Danev's rising appeal, and going against an explicit promise he had made, he created 41 new precincts in the newly acquired territories. After the count, the NP had gained a further five seats, and was consolidating itself in the opposition to Radoslavov's government. Bulgaria preserved neutrality during the first year of World War I; in that context, the NP favored Russia and the Entente Powers, with Geshov once explaining that Russophilia is "in the blood of the Bulgarians." Nedyalka Lyudskanova, a supporter of the Entente and the PLP, assessed however that the NP was among the least vocal Ententist groups, trailing far behind the enthusiastic Democrats.

Ferdinand and Radoslavov negotiated a pact with the Central Powers, managing to alienate much of the left-wing groups, including parts of the IMRO, as well as the Russophile right. As a member of the IMRO, Yane Sandanski tried to forge a coalition of Russophiles that could assassinate Ferdinand and proclaim a republic. Their secretive plan was communicated to both Malinov and Geshov, who rejected it in horror; frustrated in his effort, Sandanski dropped hints that reform would only be possible if Geshov too were murdered. Sandanski himself was shot dead in April 1915, after being ambushed by IMRO right-wingers, who thus demonstrated their loyalty to Ferdinand. By January 1915, the NP had declared its willingness to form a national unity government, whose leading mission would have been to demand a revision of the 1913 peace treaty. Later that month the NP held a nationwide congress, reaffirming its commitment to the Entente, and to Russia in particular. Teodorov took the rostrum to argue that the Central Powers would annex most of Macedonia to Austria-Hungary, while pushing Bulgaria out of Western Thrace, and only granting Bulgarians some compensations in "Old Serbia". He suggested that only an alliance with Russia, and direct involvement against the Central Powers, would help Bulgarians satisfy their "national ideal".

In tandem, some in Geshov's camp had begun expressing concerns about the Entente's dealings in Bulgaria. They joined up with the Democrats, the BZNS, and the Broad Socialists, and a Stambolovist faction led by Nikola Genadiev, in pressing for an immediate investigation into the "Declozier Affair"—which referred to revelations that the Entente Powers had intentionally created food shortages by buying off the country's grain supply, and had bribed government officials in the process. The Bulgarian Army was mobilized against Serbia in September 1915, and was immediately confronted by an anti-Bulgarian mobilization in Greece. In that emerging context, the NP stood by Radoslavov, with its press proclaiming that Bulgarians could not be intimidated. Lyudskanova argued in her memoirs that the Populists "very easily and skillfully adapted themselves to the new situation, as far as their personal interests were concerned." As she recalled, Teodorov instructed his parliamentarians not to vote against Radoslavov when the latter demanded discretionary control over half of the national budget; this ensured the cabinet's survival. Lyudskanova notes that the NP was rewarded by having its sponsors, including Gubidelnikov and Burov, be entirely kept out of the Declozier investigation.

The Romanian plenipotentiary, Gheorghe Derussi, observed that the NP was more reserved beyond its public facade. Derussi recounted his meetings with some of the opposition figures, including Teodorov, who told him: "I have received you, though they might hang me for it." Bulgaria had formally joined the Central Powers by October, and had gone to war against the Entente. Aware that the population at large was unenthusiastic about the country being at war with Russia, Radoslavov banned political gatherings and censored newspapers. Geshov again rallied with the government's position, indicating that: "all parties have now realized that the vital interests of Bulgaria now definitively point to the side of the Central Powers. [...] every Bulgarian has only one hope and desire: to achieve final victory as soon as possible, [and] on the side of our allies." As read by Lyudskanova, Mir now "became something of a Radoslavov mouthpiece".

== Todorov cabinet and clash with the BZNS ==
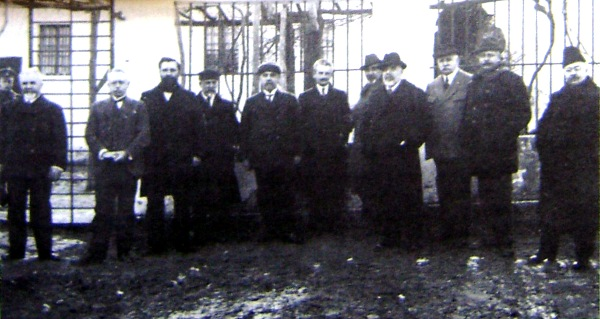
Former Bulgarian ministers as prisoners in Shumen, 1923

By May 1918, Romania had signed a truce with the Central Powers, which proved to be unsatisfactory for Bulgaria: despite numerous sacrifices on the front and various shortages, Bulgaria was expected by her allies to relinquish Northern Dobruja and even parts of Western Thrace. Radoslavov was forced to resign, handing power to Malinov and the Democratic Party. Soldiers were unpersuaded, with many deserting or joining "soviets" which propagated anti-war messaging by the BZNS, the Broad Socialists, and, increasingly, the far-left Narrow Socialists. When Radoslavov resigned in June 1918, Geshov was upheld as a likely replacement. However, a correspondent for La Lanterne newspaper reported that his advancement would have been vetoed by Austria-Hungary, which still recalled his prewar stances. The Bulgarian nation conceded defeat with a major push by the Entente in September, and agreed to the Armistice of Salonica. In October, taking the blame for the national humiliation, Ferdinand abdicated in favor of his son Boris. The Democrats preserved power within cabinets formed by Malinov, who also ensured that the nationalist right would not be immediately defeated by the looming rise of a more radical left; in late 1918, he governed together with two factions of the latter, namely the BZNS and the Broad Socialists.

Malinov resigned in November, arguing that he could not approve of Romanian conquests in Southern Dobruja; Boris had to appoint the NP's Teodorov as the new head of government. Both leftist groups were again co-opted for that ministerial formula, as was the Democratic Party—though the latter had come to engage in an increasingly bitter conflict with the BZNS. Teodorov himself tried to curtail the Agrarianists' rise, preferring to hand the more important positions, such as the Ministry of the Interior, to the Broad Socialists—who thus helped Teodorov in quashing the Radomir Rebellion. Overall, the leftists held six out of ten ministerial seats. Teodorov moved to legislate "amnesty, the abolition of censorship and of the martial law, [and] a tax on wartime profits", announcing that Bulgaria had "entered the path of real democracy". He was also successful in negotiating support from the United States Food Administration, exchanging 42% of the country's gold reserve for 22.6 million tons of flour.

Teodorov managed to survive a ministerial crisis provoked in May 1919 by his leftist partners, and managed to pay the first installments of the war reparations demanded by the Entente; he then introduced legislation formalizing the 8-hour working day, as well as other labor rights. The August 1919 elections, which came exactly as he was attending the Paris Peace Conference, witnessed an increase of the vote share for the NP, which now had 19 seats in the Assembly. However, the Bulgarian right as a whole was defeated, with three quarters of the seats going to leftist groups, including the BZNS and the Bulgarian Communist Party (BKP, formed in succession to the Narrow Socialists). Teodorov prolonged his term to prepare a draft of the Neuilly Peace Treaty. He resigned in October, leaving Agrarianist Aleksandar Stamboliyski in charge of forming the new cabinet—the BKP was asked to participate, but almost immediately rejected collaboration with the "bourgeois" left. In December 1919, the NP–PLP coalition lost control of Ruse's city government, with most voters favoring the BKP.

Unable to reach a meaningful understanding with the Broad Socialists, Stamboliyski again cooperated with the right, forming a stable majority with the NP and the PLP. The Populists were reduced to 14 seats in the elections of March 1920, which registered a BZNS sweep. On 7 November 1920 the NP merged with the PLP to form the United People's Progressive Party (ONPP). As Stamboliyski inaugurated his own radicalized and authoritarian regime, and promised to liquidate remnants of the Ferdinand era, the ONPP joined defensive coalitions: in January 1921, its Ruse branch participated in an anti-Agrarianist rally called up by the NLP, as a prelude to the formation of a nationwide "Constitutional Bloc". The two groups formed a new caucus with the Democrats, managing to defeat both the BKP and the BZNS in the local elections of June 1921. Later that year, resistance was consolidated around the People's Alliance (NS). In November 1922, the BZNS retaliated by announcing a mass trial of former dignitaries, including all members of the Geshov administration. Geshov had fled abroad, while most of his colleagues were rounded up and detained at Shumen. The BZNS-led purge was thwarted by the coup of 9 June 1923, whereby the NS and the IMRO, alongside a "Military Union", toppled the Agrarianists and assassinated Stamboliyski.
