= 1908 Bulgarian parliamentary election =

- 25 May 1908
- All 203 seats in the National Assembly; 102 seats needed for a majority
- Turnout: 50.19%
Party	Leader	Vote %	Seats	+/–
Democratic	Aleksandar Malinov	61.85	166	+159
BZNS	Dimitar Dragiev	11.07	23	+23
LP (Radoslavists)	Vasil Radoslavov	4.90	5	−4
People's Party	Ivan Geshov	8.39	4	−21
Progressive Liberal	Stoyan Danev	5.66	2	−4
People's Liberal	Nikola Genadiev	3.95	1	−131
Ind. Democrats		0.17	1	+1
Independents		0.91	1	0
This lists parties that won seats. See the complete results below.
Prime Minister before	Prime Minister after
Aleksandar Malinov; Malinov I (Democratic)	Aleksandar Malinov; Malinov I (Democratic)

Parliamentary elections were held in Bulgaria on 25 May 1908 to elect members of the XIV Ordinary National Assembly. The result was a victory for the ruling Democratic Party, which won 166 of the 203 seats. Voter turnout was 50%.

== Results ==
Party	Votes	%	Seats	+/–
Democratic Party	586,352	61.85	166	+159
Bulgarian Agrarian National Union	104,979	11.07	23	+23
Liberal Party	46,431	4.90	5	–4
People's Party	79,530	8.39	4	–21
Progressive Liberal Party	53,631	5.66	2	–4
People's Liberal Party	37,440	3.95	1	–131
Independent Democrats	1,638	0.17	1	+1
Radical Democratic Party	13,787	1.45	0	0
Bulgarian Workers' Social Democratic Party	8,101	0.85	0	0
Young Liberals Party	6,545	0.69	0	–3
Independent Liberals	75	0.01	0	–1
Liberal Agrarians	895	0.09	0	New
Independents	8,627	0.91	1	0
Total	948,031	100.00	203	+14
Total votes	467,607	–		
Registered voters/turnout	931,633	50.19		
Source: National Statistical Institute

=== By-elections ===
One MP died and several MPs were elected in more than one constituency and were required to choose which one to represent when the Assembly convened, resulting in thirty two seats being vacated. Afterwards four results were annulled, one MP resigned and another one died. By-elections were held on 12 April 1909 and 11 July 1910.

Party	Seats
Democratic Party	166
Bulgarian Agrarian National Union	19
People's Party	7
Liberal Party	5
Progressive Liberal Party	3
People's Liberal Party	1
Independent Democrats	1
Vacant	1
Total	203

== Aftermath ==
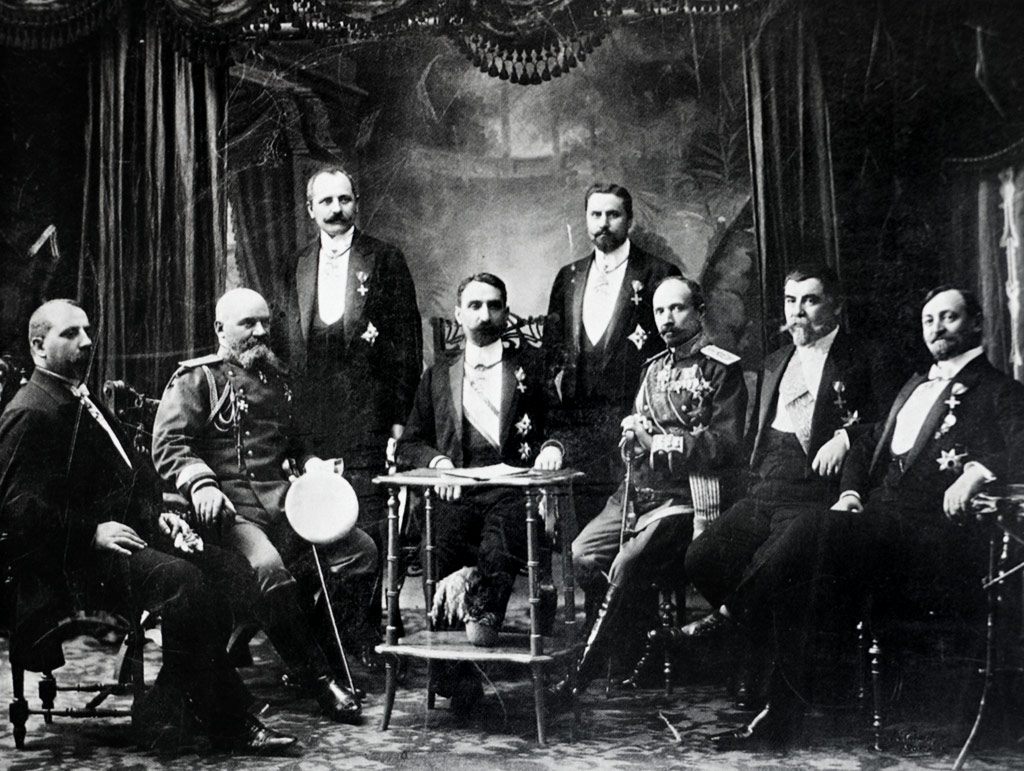
Malinov's first government, left to right: Andrey Lyapchev, Danail Nikolaev, Nikola Mushanov, Malinov, Todor Krastev, Stefan Paprikov, Ivan Salabashev, Mihail Takev

The ruling Democratic Party won a majority and its leader Malinov continued his term as PM. The government abolished many of the authoritarian measures of the previous government and oversaw electoral reform and the Bulgarian Declaration of Independence. As a result it prepared constitutional amendments, changing the monarch's title from Prince to Tsar and increasing his powers at the expense of the National Assembly. In 1911, during negotiations with Russia and Serbia regarding the formation of a Balkan alliance in a future war with the Ottoman Empire, Tsar Ferdinand dismissed the government and appointed a more Russophile one led by Ivan Geshov and scheduled elections for a Grand National Assembly to approve the prepared amendments.
