= 1911 Bulgarian parliamentary election =

- 4 September 1911
- All 213 seats in the National Assembly; 107 seats needed for a majority
- Turnout: 47.20%
Party	Leader	Seats	+/–
NP–PLP	Ivan Geshov	191	−148
LP (Radoslavists)	Vasil Radoslavov	7	+1
People's Liberal	Nikola Genadiev	6	+3
Democratic	Aleksandar Malinov	4	+2
BZNS	Dimitar Dragiev	4	−49
MLP	Dimitar Tonchev	1	+1
This lists parties that won seats. See the complete results below.
Prime Minister before	Prime Minister after
Ivan Geshov; Geshov (NP–PLP)	Ivan Geshov; Geshov (NP–PLP)

Parliamentary elections were held in Bulgaria on 4 September 1911. to elect members of the XV Ordinary National Assembly. The result was a victory for the ruling People's Party–Progressive Liberal Party alliance, which won a majority of the 213 seats. Voter turnout was 47%.

== Results ==
Party	Votes (Note: Listed is the number of votes received for each party, not the number of individual voters. As most constituencies elected more than one MP, most voters cast more than one vote.)	%	Seats
People's Party–Progressive Liberal Party	936,285	50.35	183
Bulgarian Agrarian National Union	256,791	13.81	4
Liberal Party	131,723	7.08	4
People's Liberal Party	121,145	6.52	4
Democratic Party	112,726	6.06	4
Radical Democratic Party	52,403	2.82	0
Bulgarian Social Democratic Workers' Party (United)	52,331	2.81	0
Bulgarian Social Democratic Workers' Party (Narrow Socialists)	48,889	2.63	0
Liberal Party–People's Liberal Party–Democratic Party	25,167	1.35	2
People's Party	22,470	1.21	4
Young Liberals Party	20,976	1.13	1
Liberal Party–People's Liberal Party	19,145	1.03	2
Progressive Liberal Party	18,844	1.01	2
People's Party–PLP breakaways	9,367	0.50	0
People's Party–Progressive Liberal Party–Liberal Party	8,889	0.48	3
Liberal Party–Bulgarian Agrarian National Union	5,986	0.32	0
Young Liberals Party–Democratic Party	5,204	0.28	0
Progressive Liberal Party–Liberal Party–Democratic Party	3,176	0.17	0
BZNS breakaways	2,083	0.11	0
People's Liberal breakaways	2,080	0.11	0
Progressive Liberal Party–Democratic Party	2,048	0.11	0
People's Liberal Party–Young Liberals Party	968	0.05	0
Independent	723	0.04	0
Total	1,859,419	100.00	213
Total votes	504,439	–	
Registered voters/turnout	1,068,614	47.20	
Source: National Statistical Institute

=== By-elections ===
One MP was elected in two constituencies and one MP did not take up his seat in order to hold state office (both from the People's Party elected on the NP-PLP list). By-elections were held on 27 May 1912, one seat was won by the broad socialists and one by the NP-PLP coalition (Yanko Sakazov and Grigor Kotsov).

Party	Seats
NP–PLP (Note: People's Party - 99, Progressive Liberal Party - 91)	190
LP (Radoslavists)	7
People's Liberal	6
Democratic	4
BZNS	4
Young Liberals Party	1
BRSDP (united)	1
Total	213

== Aftermath ==
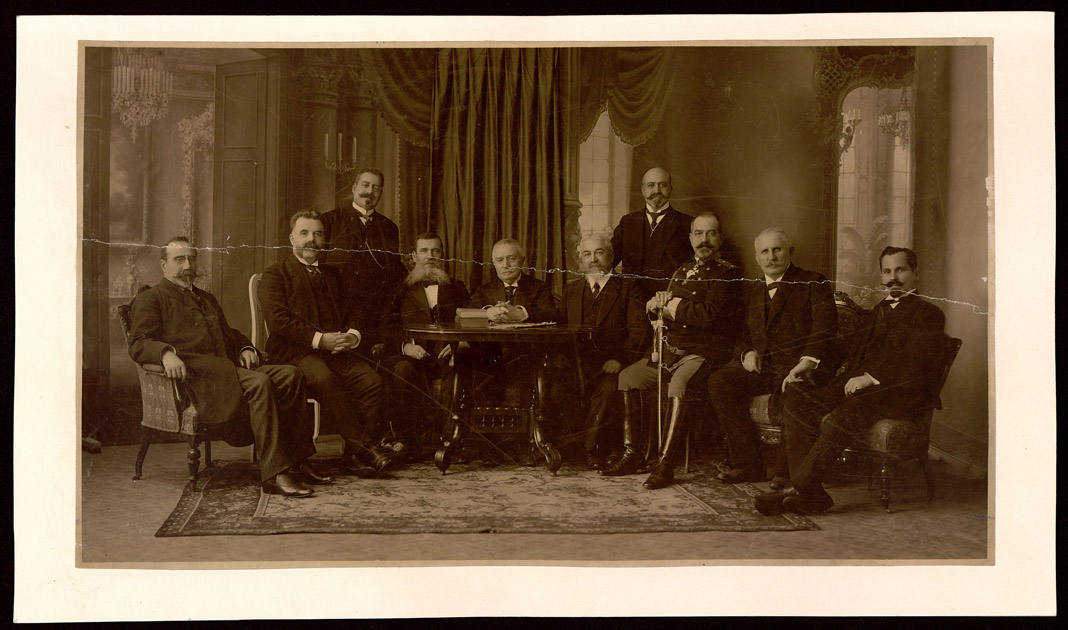
Geshov's government in 1912: Hristo Todorov, Teodor Teodorov, Anton Fragnya, Aleksandar Lyudskanov, Ivan Geshov, Stefan Bobchev, Petar Arabashev, Nikifor Nikiforov, Dimitar Yablanski, Dimitar Hristov

The ruling pro-Entente NP–PLP coalition won a majority, NP's leader Geshov continued his term as PM and PLP's leader Stoyan Danev became Chairman of Parliament. The government's main goal was to conduct the diplomatic negotiations and military preparations for the First Balkan War, which ended in a victory for the Balkan League. However, Geshov's approach during the negotiations for the subsequent Treaty of London conflicted with Tsar Ferdinand's hardline maximalist stance and he resigned on the day the treaty was signed. He became Chairman of Parliament and Danev succeeded him as PM. The outbreak of the Second Balkan War and Bulgaria's military defeats resulted in the new government's resignation.

Ferdinand appointed Vasil Radoslavov as PM, who formed a coalition of the pro-Triple Alliance liberal parties and elections were scheduled for November 1913.
