= 1896 Bulgarian parliamentary election =

- 17 November 1896
- All 165 seats in the National Assembly; 83 seats needed for a majority
Party	Leader	Seats	+/–
People's Party	Konstantin Stoilov	150	+74
Radoslavist Liberals	Vasil Radoslavov	7	−30
Stambolovist Liberals	Dimitar Grekov	3	+3
Karavelist Liberals	Petko Karavelov	2	−6
Socialists	Yanko Sakazov; Dimitar Blagoev	2	−2
Tsankovist Liberals	Dragan Tsankov	1	−39
This lists parties that won seats. See the complete results below.
Prime Minister before	Prime Minister after
Konstantin Stoilov; Stoilov III (NP)	Konstantin Stoilov; Stoilov III (NP)

Parliamentary elections were held in Bulgaria on 17 November 1896 to elect members of the IX Ordinary National Assembly. Despite the fact that the four Liberal opposition factions cooperated and ran on a joint list in many constituencies, the result was a victory for the ruling People's Party. The elections were marred by disturbances, particularly in Sofia.

== Results ==
Party	Seats
People's Party	150
Radoslavist Liberals	7
Stambolovist Liberals	3
Karavelist Liberals	2
Socialists	2
Tsankovist Liberals	1
Total	165
Source: Zornitsa

== Aftermath ==
Konstantin Stoilov continued his term as Prime Minister. His government implemented tax cuts and increased tariffs and this period saw the construction of a number of new railway lines. However Bulgaria began to increasingly rely on foreign (predominantly Austrian and French) debt, with the increasing budget deficits, which eventually led to a financial crisis. Stoilov resigned in January 1899 after Parliament voted down another proposed loan.

Independent former Stambolovist party leader Dimitar Grekov (who had been succeeded by Dimitar Petkov), was appointed PM. Following negotiations he formed a government with the Radoslavist liberals, and the two parties merged in March.
