= Liberalism and radicalism in Bulgaria =

This article gives an overview of liberalism and radicalism in Bulgaria. It is limited to liberal and radical parties with substantial support, mainly proved by having had a representation in parliament. The sign ⇒ denotes another party in that scheme. For inclusion in this scheme it is not necessary that parties label themselves as a liberal party.

== Background ==
Liberalism was a dominant political force at the end of the nineteenth century. The current got strongly divided.

== History ==
After the restoration of democracy in 1990, some parties got a liberal character. Liberalism is now represented by the mainly Turkish minority party Movement for Rights and Freedoms (Dviženie za prava i svobodi, observer LI, member ELDR), the National Movement for Simeon II (Nacionalno Dviženie Simeon Vtori, member LI, ELDR) and Democratic Bulgaria (Demokratichna Balgariya), both taking a more or less liberal position.

=== From Liberal Party to Democratic Party ===
- 1879: Liberal forces united in the Liberal Party (Liberalna Partija)
- 1884: A right-wing faction formed the ⇒ Progressive Liberal Party
- 1886: Another right-wing faction formed the ⇒ People's Liberal Party
- 1887: A third faction formed the ⇒ Radoslav Liberal Party
- 1896: The party is renamed into Democratic Party (Demokratičeska Partija)
- 1905: A radical faction seceded as the ⇒ Radical Democratic Party
- 1923: A faction joined the Democratic Alliance (Demokratičeski Sgovor)
- 1934: The party is banned by the dictatorship
- 1945: The party is revived
- 1947: The party is banned by the communist dictatorship
- 1989: The party is revived as a Christian conservative party

=== Progressive Liberal Party ===
- 1884: A right-wing faction of the ⇒ Liberal Party formed the Progressive Liberal Party (Progresivnoliberalna Partija)
- 1920: The party merged into the United People's Progressive Party (Obedinena Narodnoprogresivna Partija)

=== People's Liberal Party ===
- 1886: A right-wing faction of the ⇒ Liberal Party formed the People's Liberal Party (Narodnoliberalna Partija)
- 1920: The party merged into the ⇒ National Liberal Party

=== Radoslavist Liberal Party / National Liberal Party ===
- 1887: A right-wing faction of the ⇒ Liberal Party formed the Radoslav Liberal Party (Liberalna-Radoslavistka Partija)
- 1904: A right-wing faction seceded as the ⇒ Tonchevist Young Liberal Party
- 1920: The party merged with the ⇒ Tonchevist Young Liberal Party and the ⇒ People's Liberal Party into the National Liberal Party (Nacionalliberalna Partija)
- 1934: The party is banned by the dictatorship

=== Tonchevist Young Liberal Party ===
- 1904: A right-wing faction of the ⇒ Radoslav Liberal Party seceded as the Tonchevist Young Liberal Party (Mladoliberalna Partija-Tončevisti)
- 1920: The party merged into the ⇒ National Liberal Party

=== Radical (Democratic) Party ===
- 1905: A radical faction of the ⇒ Democratic Party seceded as the Radical Democratic Party (Radikaldemokratičeska Partija)
- 1922: The party is renamed Radical Party (Radikalna Partija)
- 1923: A faction joined the Democratic Alliance (Demokratičeski Sgovor)
- 1934: The party is banned by the dictatorship
- 1945: The party is revived
- 1949: The party is banned by the communist dictatorship
- 1989: The party is refounded as the Radical Democratic Party (Radikaldemokratičeska Partija)
- 1990s: The party took part in various electoral alliances with decreasing success

=== Movement for Rights and Freedoms ===
- 1990: Representatives of the Turkish minority formed the Movement for Rights and Freedoms (Dviženie za Prava i Svobodi), that develops in a more or less liberal direction

=== National Movement for Simeon II ===
- 2001: Followers of the ex-king formed the personalist National Movement for Simeon II (Nacionalno Dviženie Simeon Vtori), that takes a more or less liberal position in the spectrum
- 2006: GERB split from NDSV, which adopted more conservative position than NDSV.

=== "Blue" Parties/Urban Right ===
- 1989: Centre-right and conservative forces form the Union of Democratic Forces (SDS).
- 1997: SDS forms with minor parties such as ⇒ Democratic Party, National DPS (split from ⇒ DPS), Union of Free Democrats (split from SDS) and ⇒ RDP the United Democratic Forces.
- 2005: The conservative-liberal Democrats for a Strong Bulgaria (Демократи за силна България) split from the conservative SDS.
- 2007: Mariya Kapon leaves ⇒ Democratic Party and forms the United People's Party (Единна народна партия).
- 2008: Gospodin Tonev leaves SDS and forms the Bulgarian Democratic Community (Българска демократична общност).
- 2009: The conservative SDS, DSB, the social democratic Bulgarian Social Democratic Party, the agrarian United Agrarians and ⇒ Radical Democratic Party formed the centre-right Blue Coalition, leading to a series of centre-right coalitions which take a more or less liberal position in the spectrum.
- 2012: Meglena Kuneva leaves ⇒ NDSV and formed Bulgaria for Citizens Movement (Движение „България на гражданите“).
- 2012: Nadezhda Neynsky leaves SDS and formed Blue Unity (Синьо единство).
- 2014: BNG, DSB and SDS formed the Reformist Bloc. SE and ENP formed The Rights.
- 2014: Movement for European Unification and Solidarity (Движение за европейско обединение и солидарност) was formed and the Democratic Action Movement (Движение „Демократично действие“) split from SDS.
- 2015: DSB leaves the Reformist Bloc.
- 2017: Former Minister of Justice Hristo Ivanov formed Yes, Bulgaria! (Да, България!) and joins forces with DEOS. DSB and BDO form the "New Republic".
- 2018: Blue Unity and DEOS dissolve. Coalition for you Bulgaria (Коалиция за теб България) was formed.
- 2018: DSB, the green-liberal Green Movement and Yes, Bulgaria! form Democratic Bulgaria.
- 2019: ENP and DS form "Rise".
- 2021: ENP and DBG join Stand Up! Mafia, Get Out!. KztB and BDO form "We, the Citizens". DS dissolves. Dignity of United People (Достойнството на един народ) split from DBG to join Democratic Bulgaria.
- 2021: Republicans for Bulgaria leaves GERB.
- 2021: BZNS, KOD, Republicans dor Bulgaria and European Middle Class (SEK) for National Union of the Right (NOD). SEK leaves to join We Continue the Change.
- 2023: We Continue the Change, SEK, DSB, Yes Bulgaria, BZNS, United Agrarians, as well as the green parties Volt and Green Movement form the PP-DB coalition.
- 2023: Regional liberal organization „Save Sofia (Spasi Sofia)“ officially becomes a party and runs in a coalition with PP-DB.
- 2023: Unity (Единение) splits from We Continue the Change.

=== We Continue the Change ===
- 2021: Kiril Petkov and Assen Vassilev and formed We Continue the Change, that takes a more or less liberal position in the spectrum.
- 2022: We Continue the Change (Продължаваме промяната) became a party.

== Liberal leaders ==
- Pre-communist period
  - Democratic Party: Petko Karavelov - Aleksandar Malinov - Nikola Mushanov
  - Progressive Liberal Party: Dragan Tsankov - Stoyan Danev
  - People's Liberal Party: Stefan Stambolov - Dimitar Petkov
  - Radoslavist Liberal Party: Vasil Radoslavov
- Post-communist period
- Zhelyu Zhelev - Ahmed Dogan - Simeon Sakskoburggotski - Ognyan Gerdzhikov

== See also ==
- History of Bulgaria
- Politics of Bulgaria
- List of political parties in Bulgaria
