= 1911 Bulgarian Constitutional Assembly election =

- 5 June 1911
- All 426 seats in the Grand National Assembly; 214 seats needed for a majority
- Turnout: 54.01%
Party	Leader	Seats	+/–
NP–PLP (Note: People's Party - 176, Progressive Liberal Party - 163)	Ivan Geshov	339	+333
BZNS	Dimitar Dragiev	53	+30
LP (Radoslavists)	Vasil Radoslavov	6	+1
BRSDP (united)	Yanko Sakazov	5	+5
Radical Democratic Party	Naycho Tsanov	4	+4
People's Liberal	Nikola Genadiev	3	+2
Democratic	Aleksandar Malinov	2	−164
BRSDP	Dimitar Blagoev	1	+1
Independents		1	0
Vacant		12	+12
This lists parties that won seats. See the complete results below.
Prime Minister before	Prime Minister after
Ivan Geshov; Geshov (NP–PLP)	Ivan Geshov; Geshov (NP–PLP)

Constitutional Assembly elections were held in Bulgaria on 5 June 1911 to elect members of the V Grand National Assembly. The result was a victory for the ruling People's Party–Progressive Liberal Party alliance, which won 342 of the 410 seats. Voter turnout was 54.0%.

== Results ==
Party	Votes (Note: Listed is the number of votes received for each party, not the number of individual voters. As most constituencies elected more than one MP, most voters cast more than one vote.)	%	Seats
People's Party–Progressive Liberal Party	1,182,886	44.65	339
Bulgarian Agrarian National Union	507,249	19.15	50
Liberal Party–People's Liberal Party	216,684	8.18	5
Democratic Party	131,218	4.95	2
Liberal Party	70,146	2.65	2
Liberal Party–People's Liberal Party–Democratic Party	69,110	2.61	1
BRSDP (united)	66,825	2.52	0
Radical Democratic Party	61,458	2.32	4
BRSDP	59,384	2.24	1
People's Liberal Party	44,870	1.69	0
Young Liberals Party	33,517	1.27	0
BRSDP (united)-BZNS	33,227	1.25	10
People's Party	26,704	1.01	6
People's Party–Progressive Liberal Party–Liberal Party	23,049	0.87	6
Liberal Party-NLP-MLP-Dem	20,942	0.79	0
Liberal Party-Dem	16,166	0.61	0
Progressive Liberal Party	14,870	0.56	0
BZNS-RDP-Dem	12,481	0.47	0
NLP-MLP	11,800	0.45	0
NLP-MLP-Dem-PLP breakaways-Independents	10,852	0.41	0
Liberal Party-MLP-BZNS	7,932	0.30	0
NLP-Dem	6,642	0.25	0
Liberal Party-NLP-Dem-Independents	6,153	0.23	0
NLP-BZNS	5,482	0.21	0
Liberal Party-NLP-MLP-Dem-People's Party (breakaways)	3,491	0.13	0
Dem-People's Party (breakaways)	3,193	0.12	0
NLP Breakaways	393	0.01	0
Democratic breakaways	133	0.01	0
Undetermined	2,348	0.09	0
Total	2,649,205	100.00	426
Total votes	556,782	–	
Registered voters/turnout	1,030,810	54.01	
Source: National Statistical Institute

Several MPs were elected in more than one constituency and were required to choose which one to represent when the Assembly convened, resulting in twelve seats being vacated. By-elections were not held.

== Aftermath ==
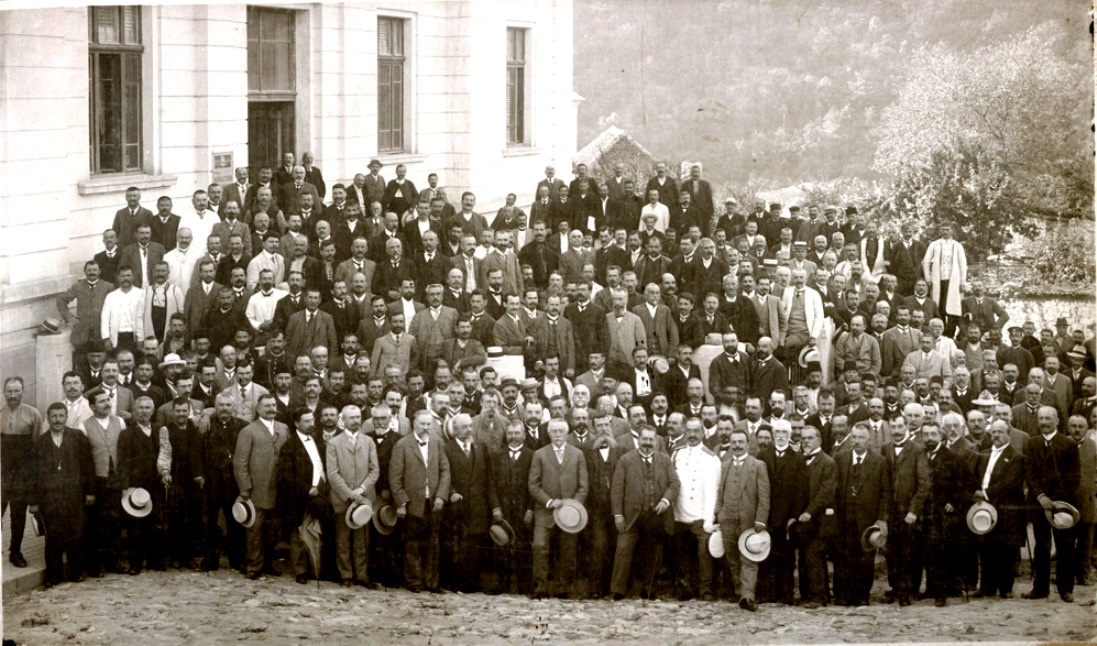
The MPs of the V Grand National Assembly and the government ministers.

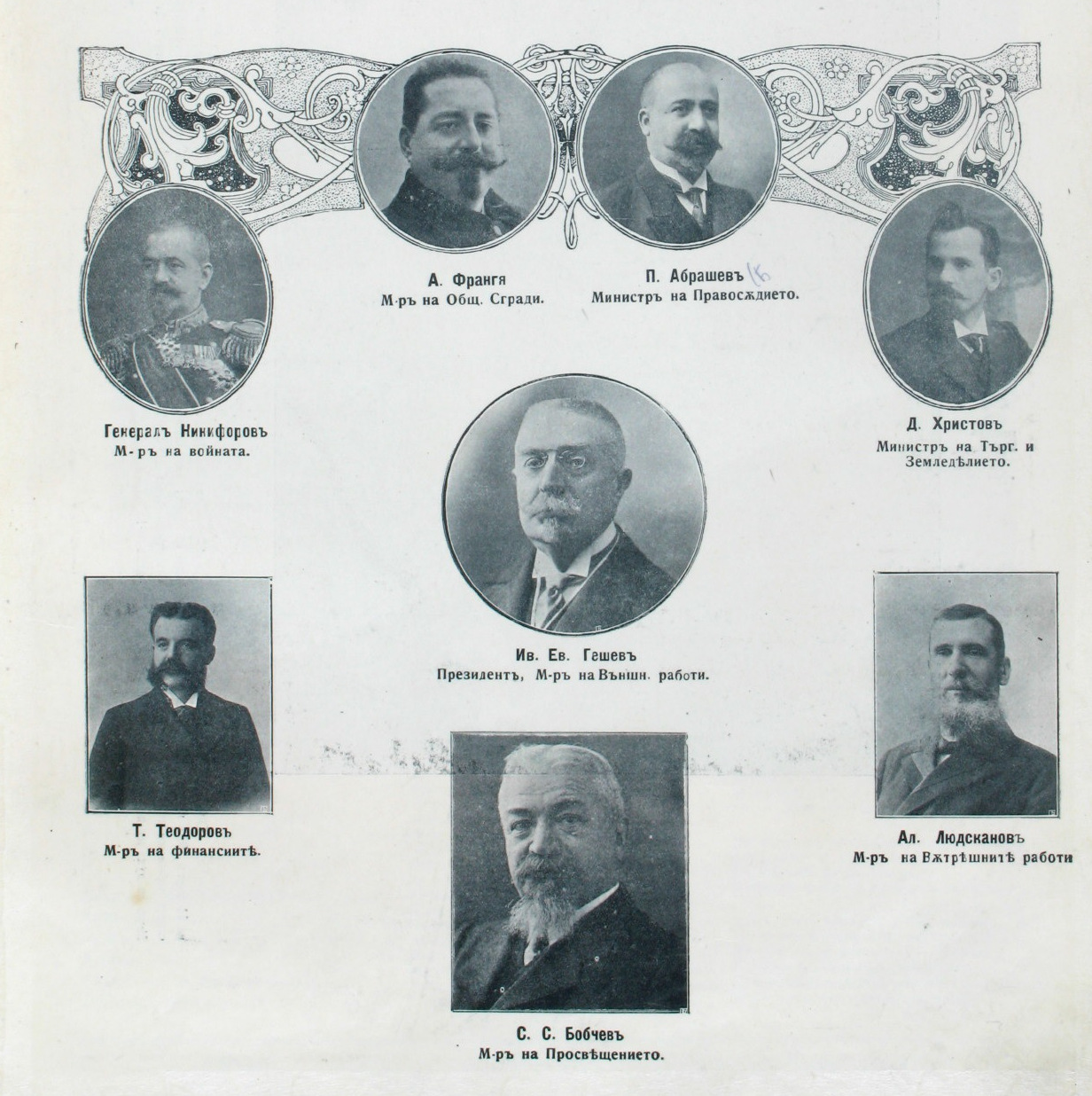
Geshov's government in 1911, clockwise from the top left: Nikifor Nikiforov, Anton Fragnya, Petar Arabashev, Dimitar Hristov, Aleksandar Lyudskanov, Stefan Bobchev, Teodor Teodorov, with Geshov in the center

The ruling pro-Entente NP–PLP coalition led by Ivan Geshov won a majority and approved the constitutional changes prepared by the previous government, notably allowing the government and the monarch to approve secret treaties without Parliamentary oversight. Afterwards the Grand Assembly dissolved itself and Tsar Ferdinand scheduled elections for an Ordinary National Assembly for September.
