= 1913 Bulgarian parliamentary election =

- 24 November 1913
- All 204 seats in the National Assembly; 103 seats needed for a majority
- Turnout: 55.01%
| Party | Leader | Vote % | Seats | +/– |
|---|---|---|---|---|
| LP–NLP–MLP | Vasil Radoslavov | 38.69 | 94 | +80 |
| BZNS | Aleksandar Dimitrov; Dimitar Dragiev | 21.18 | 48 | +44 |
| BRSDP (united) | Yanko Sakazov | 10.27 | 19 | +19 |
| BRSDP | Dimitar Blagoev | 10.10 | 18 | +18 |
| Democratic | Aleksandar Malinov | 8.00 | 14 | +10 |
| People's Party | Ivan Geshov | 4.53 | 5 | −95 |
| Radical Democratic | Naycho Tsanov | 4.47 | 5 | +5 |
| Progressive Liberal | Stoyan Danev | 2.21 | 1 | −90 |
This lists parties that won seats. See the complete results below.
| Prime Minister before | Prime Minister after |
|---|---|
| Vasil Radoslavov; Radoslavov II (LP–NLP–MLP) | Vasil Radoslavov; Radoslavov III (LP–NLP–MLP) |

Parliamentary elections were held in Bulgaria on 24 November 1913. to elect members of the XVI Ordinary National Assembly. The result was a victory for the ruling Liberal Concentration, an alliance of the Liberal Party (Radoslavists), the People's Liberal Party and the Young Liberals Party, won a plurality of votes and seats. Voter turnout was 55%. For the first time in Bulgarian history the election was held under proportional representation in all twelve of Bulgaria's pre-Balkan wars regions. Citizens in the newly annexed territories could not vote.

== Results ==
| Party or alliance | | Votes | % | Seats | +/– |
|---|---|---|---|---|---|
| Liberal Concentration | Liberal Party | 207,763 | 38.68 | 60 | +53 |
| Liberal Concentration | People's Liberal Party | 207,763 | 38.68 | 27 | +21 |
| Liberal Concentration | Young Liberals Party | 207,763 | 38.68 | 7 | +6 |
| Bulgarian Agrarian National Union | | 113,761 | 21.18 | 48 | +44 |
| Bulgarian Social Democratic Workers' Party (united) | | 55,157 | 10.27 | 19 | +19 |
| Bulgarian Social Democratic Workers' Party (Narrow Socialists) | | 54,217 | 10.10 | 18 | +18 |
| Democratic Party | | 42,971 | 8.00 | 14 | +10 |
| People's Party | | 24,994 | 4.65 | 5 | –95 |
| Radical Democratic Party | | 24,007 | 4.47 | 5 | +5 |
| Progressive Liberal Party | | 12,513 | 2.33 | 1 | –90 |
| Others | | 1,684 | 0.31 | 0 | 0 |
| Total | | 537,067 | 100.00 | 204 | –9 |
| Valid votes | | 537,067 | 98.83 | | |
| Invalid/blank votes | | 6,383 | 1.17 | | |
| Total votes | | 543,450 | 100.00 | | |
| Registered voters/turnout | | 987,832 | 55.01 | | |
Source: Zhivkov

== Aftermath ==
The ruling Liberal Concentration failed to win a majority of seats. Foreign minister and NLP leader Nikola Genadiev resigned in December 1913 in protest of the government's strongly pro-Triple Alliance foreign policy and later formed his own party. However most of the NLP, under the new leadership of Dobri Petkov, remained in government. Despite protests from many opposition MPs, early elections were called shortly afterwards and held in February 1914.
