= 1914 Bulgarian parliamentary election =

- 23 February 1914
- All 245 seats in the National Assembly; 123 seats needed for a majority
- Turnout: 67.11%
Party	Leader	Vote %	Seats	+/–
LP–NLP–MLP	Vasil Radoslavov	45.24	126	+32
BZNS	Aleksandar Dimitrov; Dimitar Dragiev	19.25	47	−1
Democratic	Aleksandar Malinov	11.33	31	+17
BRSDP (united)	Yanko Sakazov	5.92	10	−9
BRSDP	Dimitar Blagoev	5.66	11	−7
People's Party	Ivan Geshov	5.11	10	+5
Radical Democratic	Naycho Tsanov	3.58	5	0
Progressive Liberal	Stoyan Danev	3.05	2	+1
This lists parties that won seats. See the complete results below.
Prime Minister before	Prime Minister after
Vasil Radoslavov; Radoslavov III (LP–NLP–MLP)	Vasil Radoslavov; Radoslavov III (LP–NLP–MLP)

Parliamentary elections were held in Bulgaria on 23 February 1914. to elect members of the XVII Ordinary National Assembly. The result was a victory for the ruling Liberal Concentration, an alliance of the Liberal Party, the People's Liberal Party and the Young Liberals Party, which won 126 of the 245 seats, achieving a majority. Voter turnout was 67%. The coalition won with large margins in the newly incorporated territories, having promised certain degrees of religious and cultural minority rights.

== Results ==
Party or alliance		Votes	%	Seats	+/–
Liberal Concentration	Liberal Party	345,730	45.24	83	+23
Liberal Concentration	People's Liberal Party	345,730	45.24	31	+4
Liberal Concentration	Young Liberals Party	345,730	45.24	12	+5
Liberal Concentration	Undetermined Liberals	345,730	45.24	3	+3
Bulgarian Agrarian National Union		147,143	19.25	47	–1
Democratic Party		86,611	11.33	31	+17
Bulgarian Social Democratic Workers' Party (United)		45,235	5.92	10	–9
Bulgarian Social Democratic Workers' Party (Narrow Socialists)		43,251	5.66	11	–7
People's Party		39,005	5.10	10	+5
Radical Democratic Party		27,353	3.58	5	0
Progressive Liberal Party		23,307	3.05	2	+1
Others		6,651	0.87	0	0
Total		764,286	100.00	245	+41
Valid votes		764,286	99.30		
Invalid/blank votes		5,426	0.70		
Total votes		769,712	100.00		
Registered voters/turnout		1,146,880	67.11		
Source: National Statistical Institute

== Aftermath ==
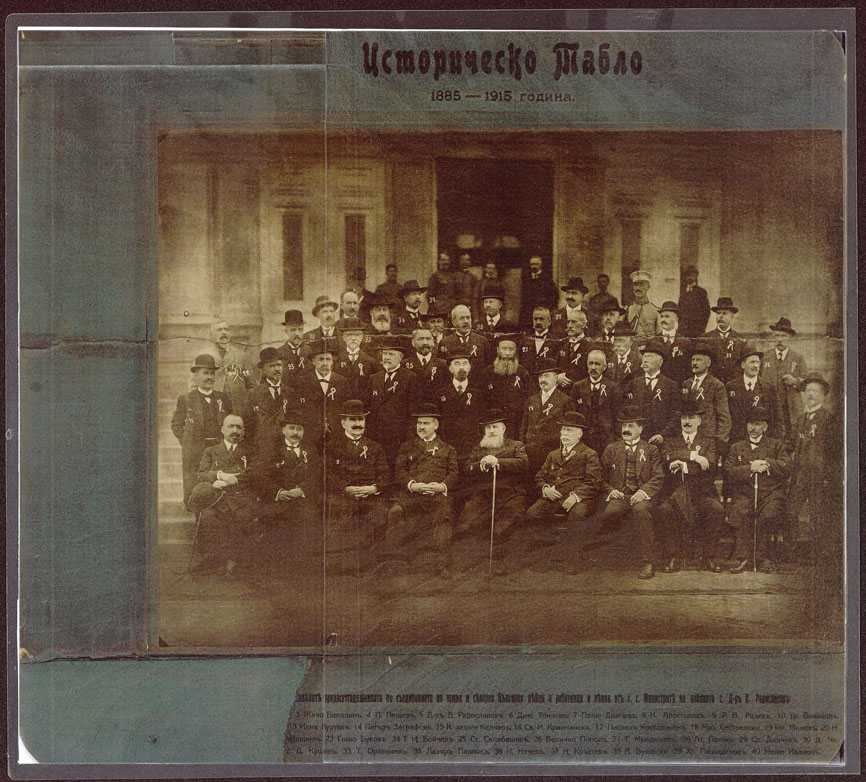
Liberal leaders in September 1915, including several government ministers, Vasil Radoslavov is 5th from the left.

Having achieved a majority the pro-Triple Alliance liberal coalition government continued its term and Vasil Radoslavov remained Prime Minister. The post-Balkan Wars financial situation in the country necessitated a foreign loan, and there were competing proposals from France and Germany, with the Assembly ultimately approving a proposal from the German Disconto-Gesellschaft bank on 2 July 1914. Bulgaria initially declared neutrality in World War I, however following a series of negotiations with both the Entente and the Central Powers in the summer of 1915 the country entered the war on the side of the Central Powers. General moblilzation was declared later that year and Bulgaria occupied a large part of Serbia. An occupation zone in Greece was also established after the formation of the Macedonian front and Greece's full entry into the war. Romania jointed the Entante in 1916 and Bulgaria took full control of Southern Dobruja and joint control of Northern Dobruja. Social unrest, famine and army mutinees resulted in the fall of the government.

In June 1918 Tsar Ferdinand appointed Aleksandar Malinov as PM, who formed a DP-RDP government, supported by all the opposition parties in Parliament except the Narrow Socialists. After failed armistice negotiations, the government vowed to "fight until a victorious end to the war", however following the Battle of Dobro Pole, the subsequent Entante advance north and the Radomir Rebellion, the country signed an armistice on 29 September 1918 and Ferdinand abdicated on the 3rd of October. Later that month the NP, BZNS and BRSDP-o joined the coalition, however Malinov resigned after the Romanian occupation of Southern Dobruja the following month.

Foreign minister Teodorov from the NP formed another national unity government, including the same parties and the PLP. In May 1919 the DP ministers were replaced.
