= 1919 Bulgarian parliamentary election =

- 17 August 1919
- All 236 seats in the National Assembly; 118 seats needed for a majority
- Turnout: 54.53%
Party	Leader	Vote %	Seats	+/–
BZNS	Aleksandar Stamboliyski	27.35	77	+30
Communist	Dimitar Blagoev	18.52	47	+36
BRSDP (United)	Yanko Sakazov	13.06	38	+28
Democratic	Aleksandar Malinov	10.39	28	−3
People's	Ivan Evstratiev Geshov	8.98	19	+9
PLP	Stoyan Danev	5.77	8	+6
RDP	Stoyan Kustorkov	5.25	8	+3
BZNS factions (Note: Includes various BZNS splinters. All eight elected were from BZNS-Stara Zagora led by Dimitar Dragiev.)	Dimitar Dragiev	4.24	8	New
PLP–Genadiev	Nikola Genadiev	2.22	1	New
PLP–Petkov	Dobri Petkov	2.07	2	−29
This lists parties that won seats. See the complete results below.
Prime Minister before	Prime Minister after
Teodor Teodorov; Teodorov (NP-PLP-RP-BRSDP (o)-BZNS)	Aleksandar Stamboliyski; Stamboliyski I (BZNS-NP-PLP)

Parliamentary elections were held in Bulgaria on 17 August 1919 to elect members of the XVIII Ordinary National Assembly. The result was a victory for the Bulgarian Agrarian National Union, which won 77 of the 236 seats. Voter turnout was 55%.

== Results ==
Party	Votes	%	Seats	+/–
Bulgarian Agrarian National Union	176,281	27.35	77	+30
Bulgarian Communist Party	119,395	18.52	47	+36
Bulgarian Social Democratic Workers' Party (United)	84,185	13.06	38	+28
Democratic Party	66,953	10.39	28	–3
People's Party	57,907	8.98	19	+9
Progressive Liberal Party	37,178	5.77	8	+6
Radical Democratic Party	33,861	5.25	8	+3
Other BZNS groups	27,349	4.24	8	New
People's Liberal Party–Genadiev	14,307	2.22	1	New
People's Liberal Party–Petkov	13,367	2.07	2	-29
Liberal Party (Radoslavists) (Note: Includes breakaways (1,618 votes) and Liberal–Young Liberals coalitions (319 votes))	9,313	1.44	0	–83
Young Liberals Party	4,093	0.63	0	–12
Others	457	0.07	0	–
Total	644,646	100.00	236	–9
Valid votes	644,646	98.22		
Invalid/blank votes	11,708	1.78		
Total votes	656,354	100.00		
Registered voters/turnout	1,203,745	54.53		
Source: National Statistical Institute

== Aftermath ==
BZNS formed a coalition government with the People's Party and the Progressive Liberal party. The government signed the Treaty of Neuilly. During its term several ministers from the government of Vasil Radoslavov were imprisoned, due to their involvement in Bulgaria's entry into WW1. Following a mass national transport workers' strike, Prime Minister Stamboliyski requested the tsar schedule early elections, in the hopes of achieving an outright majority in the Assembly.
