= 1922 Bulgarian war criminal prosecution referendum =

- 19 November 1922

Results
Choice	Votes	%
Yes	647,313	74.33%
No	223,584	25.67%
Valid votes	870,897	93.77%
Invalid or blank votes	57,879	6.23%
Total votes	928,776	100.00%

A referendum for trying the culprits for the national catastrophes was held in Bulgaria on 19 November 1922. It was approved by 74% of voters.

== Background ==
The ruling Bulgarian Agrarian National Union (BANU) sought to prosecute members of the cabinets of the governments led by Ivan Geshov, Stoyan Danev and Aleksandar Malinov motivated by the dissatisfaction of large parts of the populace with the outcome of the Balkan Wars and World War I for Bulgaria. After the wars, BANU and other opposition forces and intellectuals classified Bulgaria's territorial loses during 1913 and 1918 as national catastrophes — called in Bulgaria the First and Second national catastrophes, respectively. These terms were frequently used in Bulgaria during the Interwar period. On 24 September 1922 17 of the 22 ministers were arrested, and a law on prosecution was published on 17 October.

== Results ==
Choice	Votes	%
For	647,313	74.33
Against	223,584	25.67
Total	870,897	100.00
Valid votes	870,897	93.77
Invalid votes	2,286	0.25
Blank votes	55,593	5.99
Total votes	928,776	100.00
Source: Direct Democracy

== See also ==
- War crimes in World War I
