= 1887 Bulgarian parliamentary election =

Parliamentary elections were held in Bulgaria on 9 October 1887. The People's Liberal Party led by Stefan Stambolov won a large majority, taking 260 of the 292 seats in the National Assembly, whilst the three opposition parties led by Petko Karavelov, Vasil Radoslavov and Dragan Tsankov won 32 between them. All three opposition party leaders lost their seats.

Voter turnout was only around 33%, with only 3,039 votes cast in Sofia. Thirty people died in violence related to the election.

== Results ==
Party	Seats
Stambolovist Liberals	260
Radoslavist Liberals	32
Conservatives	32
Tsankovist Liberals	32
Karavelist Liberals	32
Total	292
Source: The Times
