= Bulgarian Social Democratic Workers' Party (Narrow Socialists) =

Bulgarian Social Democratic Workers' Party Българска работническа социалдемократическа партия
- Leader: Dimitar Blagoev
- Founded: 1903
- Dissolved: 28 May 1919
- Split from: BRSDP
- Succeeded by: BCP
- Ideology: Communism; Marxism; Revolutionary socialism
- Political position: Far-left

Bulgarian Social Democratic Workers' Party (Narrow Socialists) (Bulgarian: Българска работническа социалдемократическа партия (тесни социалисти), romanized: Balgarska rabotnicheska sotsialdemokraticheska partia (tesni sotsialisti)) was a Marxist, socialist political party in Bulgaria. The party's origins lays in 1903, after a split at the 10th Congress of the Bulgarian Workers' Social Democratic Party. The other faction formed the Bulgarian Social Democratic Workers' Party (Broad Socialists).

== History ==
The party's leader was Dimitar Blagoev, the driving force behind the formation of the BSDWP in 1894. It comprised most of the hardline Marxists in the Workers' Social Democratic Party, which followed the doctrine of class struggle. This entailed concentrating on building the party amongst the industrial working class rather than creating a broader political framework which would also appeal to the peasantry. One feature of this was their proposal to confiscate all private property, which inhibited their electoral success.

In 1909 the Social Democratic Union 'Proletarian', which had been expelled from the Narrow Socialists, merged into the Broad Socialist party. At the Zimmerwald Conference, where the unraveling of the coalition between revolutionary socialists and reformist socialists in the Second International began, the party supported the so-called Zimmerwald Left. It opposed World War I and was sympathetic to the October Revolution in Russia. Under the influence of the Bolsheviks the narrow socialists accepted the ideas of Leninism. Under Blagoev's leadership, the party applied to join the Communist International in 1919. Upon joining the Comintern the party was reorganised as the Bulgarian Communist Party.

== Electoral history ==
Election	Party leader	Votes		Seats		Position
Election	Party leader	#	%	#	±	Position
1908	Dimitar Blagoev	1,505	0.32	0 / 203	Steady	Opposition
June 1911	Dimitar Blagoev	9,220	1.66	1 / 410	▲1	Opposition
September 1911	Dimitar Blagoev	12,850	2.55	0 / 212	▼1	Opposition
1913	Dimitar Blagoev	54,217	10.10	18 / 204	▲18	Opposition
1914	Dimitar Blagoev	43,251	5.66	11 / 245	▼7	Opposition
1919	Dimitar Blagoev	119,395	18.52	47 / 236	▲36	Opposition

== See also ==
- Bulgarian Communist Party
