= Negotiations of Bulgaria with the Central Powers and the Entente =

The Negotiations of Bulgaria with the Central Powers and the Entente were attempts of the two belligerents in World War I, the Central Powers and the Entente to involve Bulgaria in the war on their side. They are also called The Bulgarian Summer of 1915.

When the war broke out the country was in an unfavorable situation - the country had just suffered a national catastrophe following the Second Balkan War in which Serbia, Greece, Romania and the Ottoman Empire defeated Bulgaria, and retook many territories occupied by Bulgaria during the First Balkan War. In August 1914, nearly a month after the war broke out, the Bulgarian Prime Minister Vasil Radoslavov declared that Bulgaria would remain neutral. That, however, was only temporary as the Bulgarian government expected an opportune moment and favorable terms to enter the war and regain its lands. On 19 August, it signed an alliance with Turkey.

Bulgaria was important for both belligerents because of its strategic geo-political position in the Balkans and its strong army. If Bulgaria entered the war on the side of the Central Powers then Serbia would have been defeated, which could influence the still neutral Romania and Greece. If Bulgaria allied itself with the Entente it would have disrupted the links of Germany and Austria-Hungary with the Ottoman Empire and would have taken the straits opening a sea route to Russia. The Entente offered Bulgaria Eastern Thrace to the west of the line Midia-Enos and uncertain guarantees for Macedonia. However, Serbia and Greece were reluctant to make any concessions to Bulgaria.

The Central Powers offered Vardar Macedonia and eastern Serbia and, in case Romania or Greece entered the war, Southern Dobruja and Aegean Macedonia, respectively. Germany also guaranteed a 500 million-mark military loan.

Subsequently, in September 1915 Bulgaria signed the Bulgaria-German treaty, Secret Bulgarian-German agreement, the Military convention between Germany, Austria-Hungary and Bulgaria and the Bulgarian-Turkish convention.
