= Social Democratic Union 'Proletarian' =

Social Democratic Union 'Proletarian' was a political party organization in Bulgaria from 1906 until 1908. The organization was led by Dimitar Blagoev, who had been expelled from the Narrow Socialists for being an "anarcho-liberal". 'Proletarian' merged with the Broad Socialists, and would represent the left-wing tendency within that movement from 1909 onwards.
