= Young Liberals Party =

Young Liberals Party Младолиберална партия
- Leader: Dimitar Tonchev
- Founded: 1904
- Dissolved: 1920
- Split from: Radoslavist Liberal Party
- Merged into: National Liberal Party
- Newspaper: Svobodno Slovo

The Young Liberals Party (Bulgarian: Младолиберална партия, Mladoliberalna partiya, MLP) was a political party in Bulgaria during the early 20th century.

== History ==
The party was established in 1904 by Dimitar Tonchev after a group of Radoslavist Liberal Party members were expelled following a failed attempt to remove Vasil Radoslavov as party leader. In their first elections in 1908 the party failed to win a seat. The MLP again failed to win a seat in the 1911 Constitutional Assembly elections, but did win one seat in the parliamentary elections later in the year, in which it formed local alliances with the Radoslavist Liberal Party and the People's Liberal Party.

The three parties formed the Liberal Concentration alliance for the 1913 elections, emerging as the largest faction in the National Assembly. In the elections the following year the alliance won a majority of seats, but the MLP suspended political activities during World War I. The party did not contest the 1919 elections, but returned to run in the 1920 elections alongside the Radoslavist Liberal Party and the Petkov faction of the People's Liberal Party. Later in the year the three parties merged to form the National Liberal Party.

The party published a newspaper Svobodno Slovo (Free Speech) between 1904 and 1913.
