= Democratic Party (Bulgaria) =

Democratic Party Демократическа партия
- Founder: Petko Karavelov
- Founded: 1896
- Preceded by: Liberal Party
- Headquarters: Sofia, Bulgaria
- Ideology: Social liberalism
- Political position: Centre-left

The Democratic Party (Bulgarian: Демократическа партия, Demokraticheska partia, DP) is a centre-left political party in Bulgaria led by Alexander Pramatarski. The party was a member of the European People's Party (EPP).

== History ==
The Democratic Party was formed by a breakaway from the Liberal Party led by Petko Karavelov in 1896. In the 1899 elections the party won 10 seats. It went on to win 27 in 1901, with Karavelov briefly serving as Prime Minister after the elections in a coalition government with the People's Liberal Party (PLP). However, the DP was reduced to seven seats in the 1902 elections. After remaining at seven seats following the 1903 elections and despite suffering a split in 1905 when the Young Democrats broke away to form the Radical Democratic Party, the party achieved a landslide in the 1908 elections, winning 166 of the 203 seats. Aleksandar Malinov became the party's second Prime Minister.

Malinov was removed from office in 1911, and the party failed to win a seat in the Constitutional Assembly elections in June, although a joint list with the Radoslavist Liberal Party and the PLP won two seats. In parliamentary elections in September the party won four seats. It won 14 seats in the 1913 elections and 31 in the early elections in 1914.

The 1919 elections saw the party win 28 seats, before it was reduced to 24 seats in the 1920 elections. For the April 1923 elections the DP joined the Constitutional Bloc alliance formed in order to oppose the Bulgarian Agrarian National Union (BZNS). The alliance took 17 seats as the BZNS won a landslide victory. For the November 1923 elections the party was part of the victorious Democratic Alliance.

In the 1927 elections the party won 11 seats after running in an alliance with the Tomov faction of the BZNS and the Kyorchev faction of the National Liberal Party (NLP). Prior to the 1931 elections the party joined the People's Bloc, an alliance of the Dragiev faction of the BZNS, the Petrov faction of the NLP and the Radical Democratic Party.

After World War II the party contested the 1946 Constitutional Assembly elections, but failed to win a seat. The party did not become part of the ruling Fatherland Front.

After the fall of the Communist regime the party was re-established in 1990 and joined the Union of Democratic Forces (SDS) alliance. The SDS won the second highest number of seats in the 1990 Constitutional Assembly elections before going onto win the parliamentary elections the following year. For the 1994 elections, the Democratic Party left the SDS and formed the People's Union alliance with the BZNS, winning eighteen seats. For the 1997 elections the Democratic Party joined the victorious United Democratic Forces (ODS) alliance alongside the SDS.

The party remained in the ODS for the 2001 elections, which it lost to the National Movement – Simeon II. The 2005 elections saw the ODS alliance reduced to 20 seats.
