= Progressive Liberal Party (Bulgaria) =

Progressive Liberal Party Прогресивнолиберална партия
- Leader: Dragan Tsankov; Stoyan Danev
- Founded: 1884
- Dissolved: 1920
- Split from: Liberal Party
- Merged into: United People's Progressive Party
- Headquarters: Sofia, Bulgaria
- Newspaper: Съгласие; България
- Ideology: Russophilia

The Progressive Liberal Party (Bulgarian: Прогресивнолиберална партия, Progresivnoliberalna partiya, PLP) was a political party in Bulgaria.

== History ==
The party was established by Dragan Tsankov as a splinter from the Liberal Party in 1884, and was pro-Russian in its orientation. It supported the 1886 pro-Russian coup and its ministers were the only ones to accept being appointed to the short-lived Kliment II government. Following the counter-coup and the appointment of Stambolov as Prime Minister, the party was banned and Tsankov fled to Russia. It was restored after Tsankov's return, following Stambolov's fall from power in 1894. In the 1894 elections it won eight of the 167 seats, a total it maintained in the 1899 elections. In the 1901 elections the PLP emerged as the largest party, winning 40 of the 164 seats. It remained the largest party after the 1902 elections, winning 89 seats, but was reduced to six seats in the 1903 elections.

The 1908 elections saw the party win just three seats. For the 1911 Constitutional Assembly elections the PLP ran in alliance with the People's Party, with the joint list winning 342 of the 410 seats. The alliance was continued for the parliamentary elections later in the year, with the two parties winning 190 of the 213 seats, of which the PLP took 91. Tsankov died in 1911, and was replaced as party leader by Stoyan Danev, who served as prime minister for just over a month in the summer of 1913.

In the November 1913 elections the party was reduced to just a single seat, although it gained another in the elections the following year. In the 1919 elections the PLP won eight seats, which it maintained in the 1920 elections.

Later in 1920 the party merged with the People's Party to form the United People's Progressive Party.
