= Liberal Party (Radoslavists) =

Liberal Party (Radoslavists) Либерална партия (радослависти)
- Leader: Vasil Radoslavov
- Founded: 1887
- Dissolved: 29 November 1920
- Split from: People's Liberal Party
- Merged into: National Liberal Party
- Headquarters: Sofia, Bulgaria
- Ideology: Liberalism

The Liberal Party (Bulgarian: Либерална партия, Liberalna partiya), also known as the Radoslavists (Bulgarian: радослависти) was a political party in Bulgaria from 1887 until 1920.

== History ==
The party was established by Vasil Radoslavov as a splinter from the People's Liberal Party (PLP) in 1887, going on to lose to the PLP in the elections that year.

The 1894 elections saw the party win 27 seats. During 1899 the party briefly merged with the PLP to form the United Liberal Party, but the two separated again later in the year. In April 1899 it won an absolute majority in the National Assembly with 89 of the 169 seats. However, the party was reduced to just five seats in the 1901 elections. It won seven seats in 1902 and nine in 1903. In 1904 a group of members were expelled after trying to remove Radoslavov as party leader, and went on to form the Young Liberals Party.

The 1908 elections saw the party reduced to five seats. In the 1911 Constitutional Assembly elections it won 6 of the 410 seats, before going on to win seven seats in the parliamentary elections later in the year.

For the 1913 elections the party allied with the People's Liberal Party and the Young Liberals Party to form the Liberal Concentration, with the alliance emerging as the largest faction in the National Assembly, holding 88 of the 204 seats. The Liberal Party was the largest of the three groups in the alliance with 54 seats, and Vasil Radoslavov became Prime Minister for a second time. The alliance was continued for the 1914 elections, which saw the Liberal Concentration win an absolute majority and Radoslavov remain Prime Minister. Radoslavov was dismissed after Bulgaria's defeat in World War I, and the party did not contest the 1919 elections. In the 1920 elections the party ran in an alliance with the Young Liberals Party and the Genadiev faction of the PLP, but failed to win a seat. The three merged in the same year to form the National Liberal Party.
