= Ivan Evstratiev Geshov =

Bulgarian politician (1849–1924)

- Иван Евстратиев Гешов
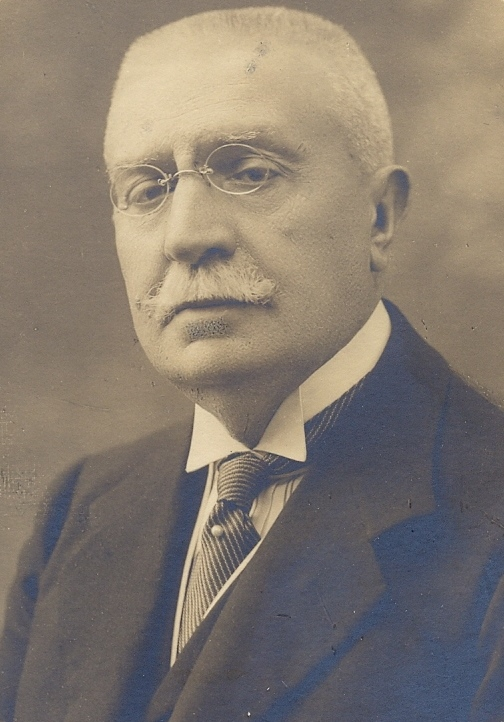
- Geshov in 1920

18th Prime Minister of Bulgaria
- In office 29 March 1911 – 14 June 1913
- Preceded by: Aleksandar Malinov
- Succeeded by: Stoyan Danev
- Monarch: Ferdinand

Personal details
- Born: 20 February [8 February O.S.] 1849 Plovdiv, Ottoman Empire
- Died: 11 March 1924 (aged 75) Sofia, Bulgaria
- Resting place: Central Sofia Cemetery
- Party: People's Party (until 1920); United People's Progressive Party (1920–1923)
- Education: Owens College

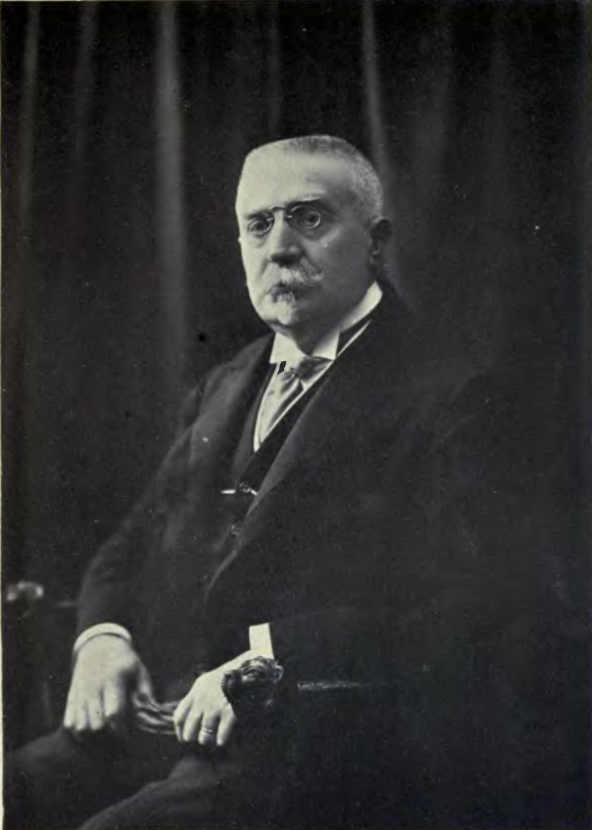
Ivan Evstratiev Geshov.

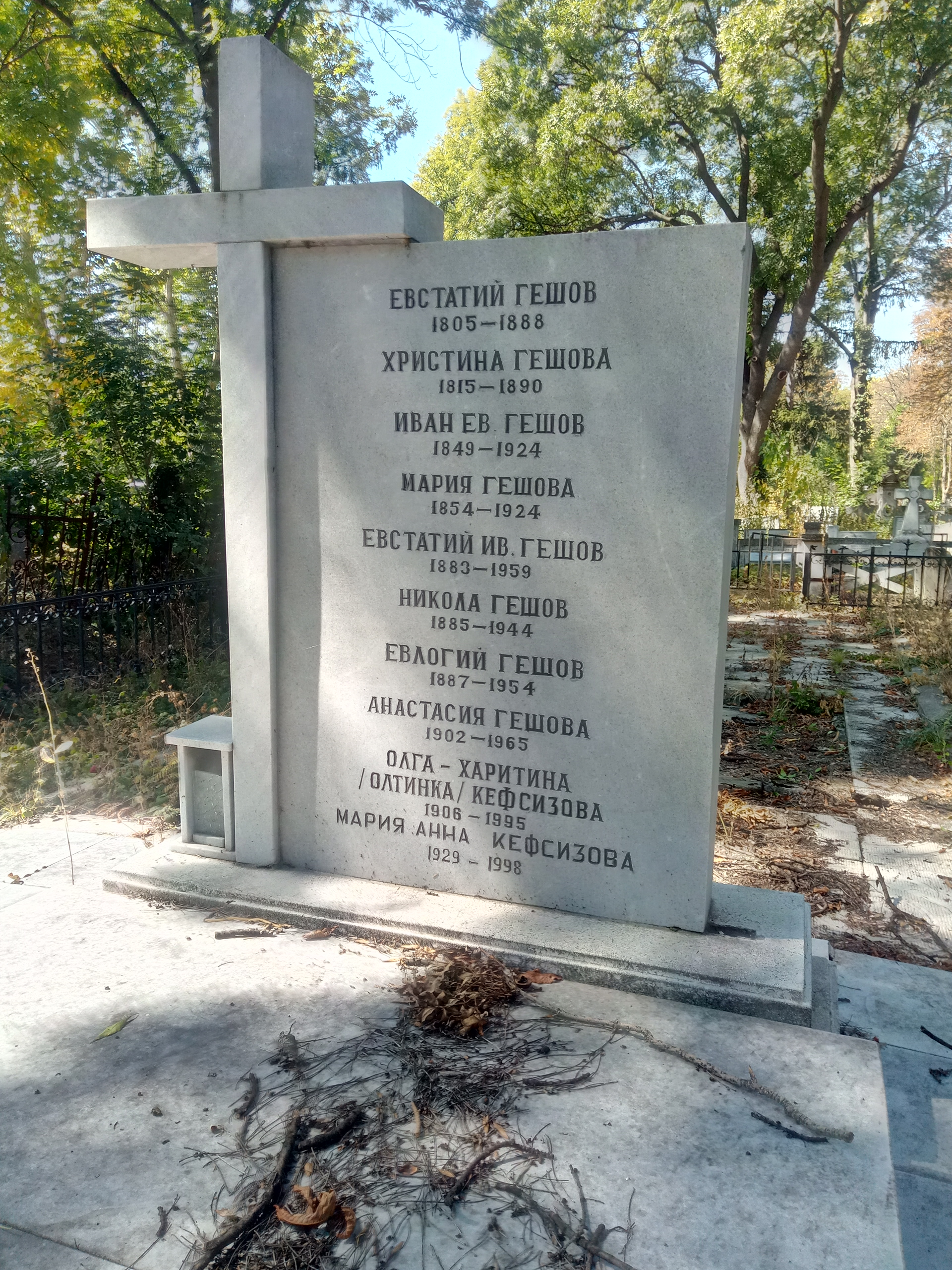
The Grave of Ivan Evstratiev Geshov at Sofia Central Cemetery 42°42′48.7″N 023°20′00.6″E

Ivan Evstratiev Geshov (Bulgarian: Иван Евстратиев Гешов; 20 February 1849 – 11 March 1924) was a Bulgarian economist and politician who served as Governor of the Bulgarian National Bank, Bulgarian Prime Minister and Minister of Foreign Affairs.

== Biography ==
He was born in Plovdiv to a family of merchants originally from Karlovo. Geshov was educated at the Bulgarian Sts. Cyrill and Methodius High School in Plovdiv, as well as at Owens College in Manchester (1866–1869), where he studied logic and political economy under William Stanley Jevons, chemistry under Henry Roscoe, classics under Joseph Gouge Greenwood, English literature and history under Adolphus Ward. Geshov first came to political attention through his involvement in the campaign for Bulgarian independence from the Ottoman Empire. He wrote a series of letters against the Ottomans and was sentenced to death, although this was later commuted to exile in Aleppo. He was pardoned in 1878 after independence was gained and returned to Bulgaria to become involved in the government of Eastern Rumelia, taking on a number of roles including Minister of Finance for the region.

As governor of the Bulgarian National Bank from 1883 onwards he became recognized as one of the country's leading economic minds and was eventually appointed Finance Minister in the government of Vasil Radoslavov in 1886. In this role, and subsequent spells as Finance Minister, he tended to follow protectionism in order to build up Bulgaria's fairly backward economy. However he was opposed to the policies of Stefan Stambolov, at the time one of the country's regents, and resigned in 1887, largely over the pro-Austria-Hungary stance of Stambolov.

After a break from political life, he returned as Finance Minister in the government of Konstantin Stoilov in 1894, a position he held for three years. In 1901 he became President of the Sabranie (Assembly) and that same year was elected leader of the People's Party, following the death of Stoilov. In 1908, he took part in the so called "Geshoff incident".

Geshov finally formed a government on 29 March 1911, heading a moderate coalition of nationalists and Stoyan Danev's Russophile faction. As Prime Minister he supported the introduction of the proportional representation electoral system. He also supported the policy of working through the Balkan League and led the country through the First Balkan War against Ottoman Empire. However, he resigned on 30 May 1913, the day that the Treaty of London was signed to end the War, as he opposed the Tsar's policy of making war on the Balkan League allies. Despite this, it had been Geshov's government that gave the Tsar the power to sign treaties in the first place.

Geshov remained in politics as a member of the parliament, joining the Democratic Party in 1923 after the fall of the government of Aleksandar Stamboliyski, but he played no further roles in government.

Outside politics he fulfilled a number of roles, including editor of the Maritsa newspaper, founder of the Study Society and the Scientific and Literary Society and chairman of the Bulgarian Red Cross (1899–1924) and the Bulgarian Academy of Sciences (1911–1924).

Political offices
Preceded by Aleksandar Malinov	Prime Minister of Bulgaria; 1911–1913	Succeeded by Stoyan Danev
Preceded by Aleksandar Malinov	Minister of Foreign Affairs of Bulgaria; 1911–1913	Succeeded by Stoyan Danev
