= Stoyan Danev =

Bulgarian politician

- Стоян Данев
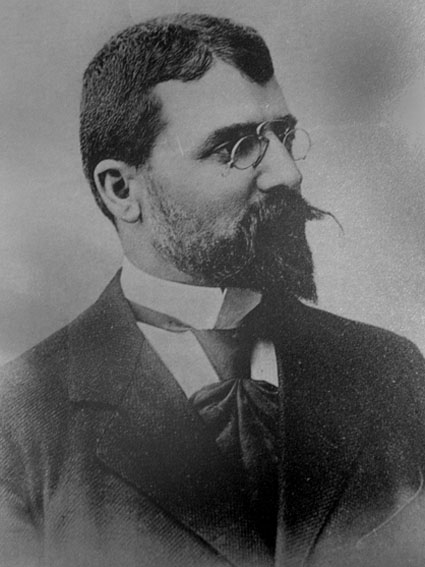

13th Prime Minister of Bulgaria
- In office 4 January 1902 – 19 May 1903
- Monarch: Ferdinand
- Preceded by: Petko Karavelov
- Succeeded by: Racho Petrov
- In office 14 June 1913 – 17 July 1913
- Monarch: Ferdinand
- Preceded by: Ivan Evstratiev Geshov
- Succeeded by: Vasil Radoslavov

Personal details
- Born: 28 January 1858 Shumen, Ottoman Empire
- Died: 30 July 1949 (aged 91) Sofia, Bulgaria
- Resting place: Central Sofia Cemetery; 42°42′51.6″N 023°20′04.5″E
- Party: Progressive Liberal Party

Stoyan Petrov Danev (Bulgarian: Стоян Петров Данев) (28 January 1858 – 30 July 1949) was a leading Bulgarian liberal politician and twice Prime Minister.

A legal graduate of both the University of Heidelberg and the University of Paris, Danev served in a number of Ministerial roles, including Foreign Minister, and became known as a strong supporter of Imperial Russia. During Danev's first period of Prime Minister (which began on 4 January 1902) the question of the Bulgarian Macedonians came to the fore. A group known as the Macedonian Supreme Committee had been established in Sofia by Trayko Kitanchev which aimed to reclaim Macedonian land from the Ottoman Empire. In 1902 the group launched an uprising in the Struma River region, although it was put down and Danev, under advice from Russia, outlawed the movement. His reign was dogged by the Macedonian issue from then until 1903 when he was removed from office due to fear of an all out Bulgarian uprising in Macedonia, as well as his opposition to the warlike local bands who enjoyed some popular support in Bulgaria, and replaced by General Racho Petrov.

Danev went on to serve in a number of moderate coalition governments and was a signatory of the Treaty of London. When it became clear that Tsar Ferdinand did not intend honouring the treaty Danev was chosen to succeed Ivan Evstratiev Geshov as Prime Minister, although his second ministry proved brief. He was Minister of Finance from 1918 to 1920.

== Longevity ==
At the age of 91 years, 183 days, Danev was the longest lived Prime Minister in the history of Bulgaria.

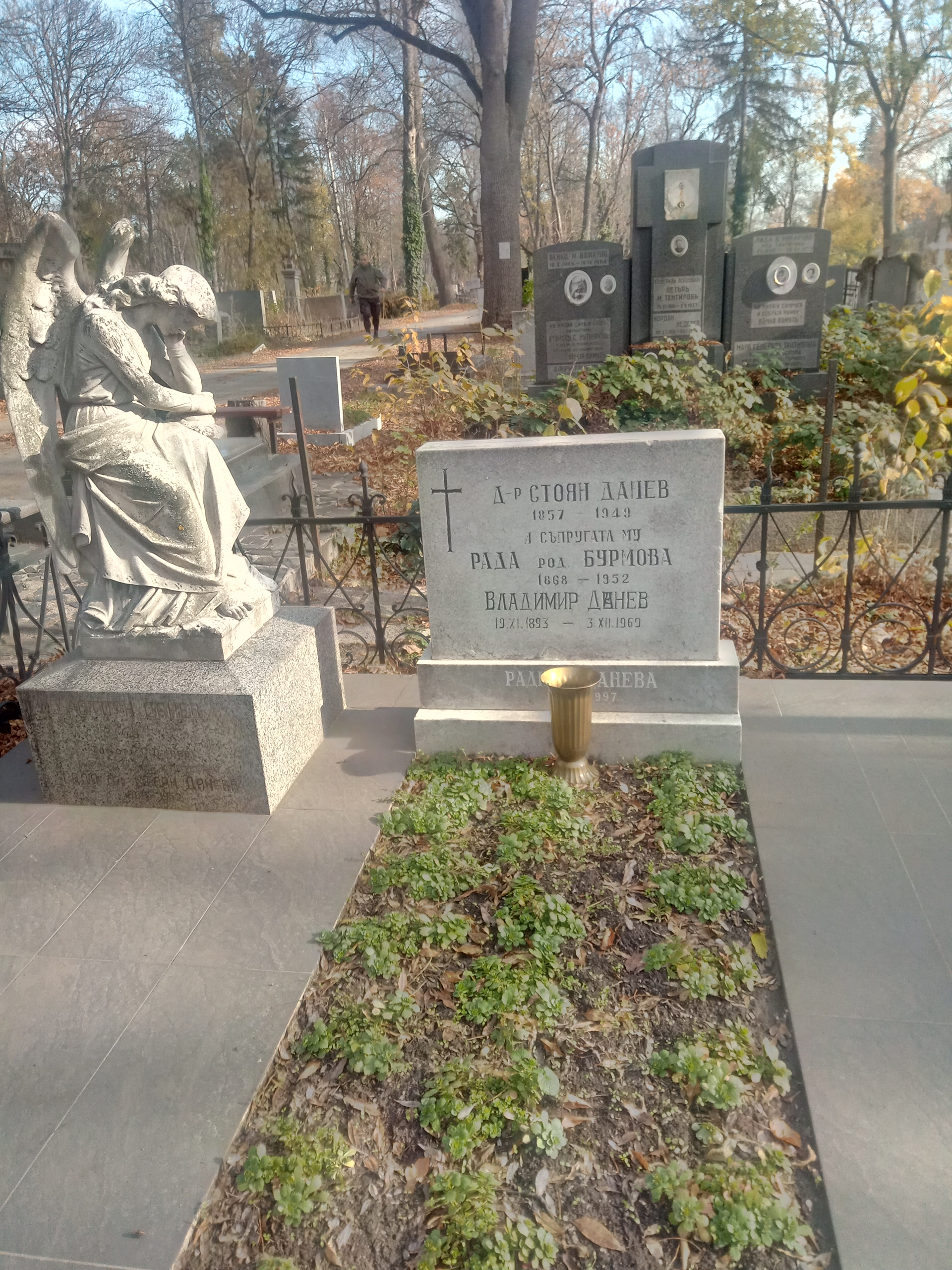
The Grave of Stoyan Danev in Central Sofia Cemetery (42°42′51.6″N 023°20′04.5″E)

Political offices
Preceded by Petko Karavelov	Prime Minister of Bulgaria; 1901–1903	Succeeded by Racho Petrov
Preceded by Racho Petrov	Minister of Foreign Affairs of Bulgaria; 1901–1903	Succeeded by Racho Petrov
Preceded by Ivan Geshov	Minister of Foreign Affairs of Bulgaria; 1913	Succeeded by Nikola Genadiev
