= People's Liberal Party =

1886–1920 political party in Bulgaria

People's Liberal Party Народнолиберална партия
- Founded: 1886
- Dissolved: c. 1920
- Split from: Liberal Party
- Merged into: National Liberal Party
- Headquarters: Sofia, Bulgaria

The People's Liberal Party (Bulgarian: Народнолиберална партия, Narodnoliberalna partiya, NLP) was a political party in Bulgaria.

== History ==
One of the four factions to emerge from the old Liberal Party, the party was established by Stefan Stambolov in 1886 as the Bulgaria for itself organisation, before becoming the NLP the following year. It was the ruling party until Stambolov was dismissed from his post of Prime Minister by Prince Ferdinand in 1894, after which it was briefly banned. In the 1899 elections the party emerged as the second largest in the National Assembly with 19 of the 169 seats, and during the same year it briefly merged with the Radoslavist Liberal Party to form the United Liberal Party, before demerging. The 1901 elections saw the party win 24 seats, although it was reduced to being the fourth largest party. In the elections the following year the NLP was reduced to just eight seats.

The party was in power again between 1903 and 1908. After the Balkan Wars the party ran in the next two elections in a coalition with the Liberal Party and the Young Liberals Party; in the 1913 elections the NLP won 26 seats, making it the third largest party in the National Assembly, and went on to win 31 seats in the elections the following year.

In 1913 the party split into two factions, one led by Dobri Petkov and the other by Nikola Genadiev. In the 1919 elections the Petkov faction won two seats, whilst the Genadiev group won just one. The 1920 elections saw both factions double their seat tally. However, this was the last election contested by either faction. Later in 1920 both groups merged with the Liberal Party (Radoslavists) and the Young Liberals Party to form the National Liberal Party. The party was restored between 1925 and 1928 by NLP breakaways in the 1920s, but eventually merged back into the National Liberal Party.
