= Aleksandar Malinov =

Bulgarian politician

- Александър Малинов
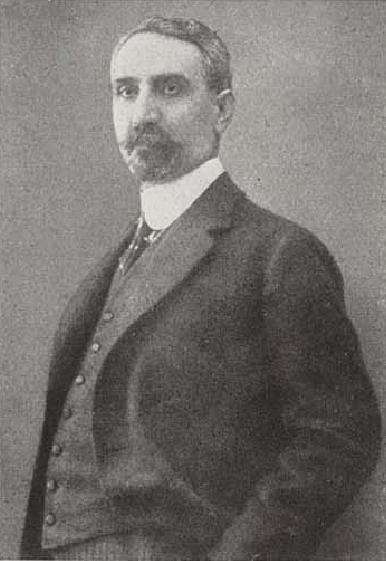
- Malinov in 1918

17th Prime Minister of Bulgaria
- In office 29 January 1908 – 29 March 1911
- Monarch: Ferdinand
- Preceded by: Petar Gudev
- Succeeded by: Ivan Geshov
- In office 21 June 1918 – 28 November 1918
- Monarchs: Ferdinand (21 June 1918 - 3 October 1918); Boris III (3 October 1918 - 28 November 1918)
- Preceded by: Vasil Radoslavov
- Succeeded by: Teodor Teodorov
- In office 29 June 1931 – 12 October 1931
- Monarch: Boris III
- Preceded by: Andrey Lyapchev
- Succeeded by: Nikola Mushanov

Personal details
- Born: 3 May 1867 Pandakli, Russian Empire (present-day Ukraine)
- Died: 20 March 1938 (aged 70) Sofia, Bulgaria
- Party: Democratic Party
- Profession: Prosecutor, Judge

Aleksandar Pavlov Malinov (Bulgarian: Александър Павлов Малинов; 3 May 1867 – 20 March 1938) was a leading Bulgarian politician who served as Prime Minister on three occasions. He was born in Pandakli, Bessarabia (present-day Orikhivka, Ukraine) in a family of Bessarabian Bulgarians.

Malinov was known for his support for close ties to Russia and he pursued this policy during his first ministry of 1908-1911. Malinov, who veered towards liberalism, presided over a relatively unremarkable tenure during which his main concern was stabilising the newly independent country. He was vehemently opposed to the increasing economic links with Germany which followed his period of office. He urged Vasil Radoslavov to follow a policy of neutrality after the outbreak of the First World War, fearing that Germany would simply exploit Bulgarian resources for her own war effort.

He was recalled as prime minister in 1918 specifically to attempt to negotiate an Armistice with the Allies as he had a reputation for moderation and consensus building. After these attempts failed Malinov vowed to fight on, although when a new investment of German money did not materialise he was forced to look for peace. Although Malinov had been appointed as he was seen by both the Tsar and Germany as a trustworthy hand, his position was severely weakened by the fact that the army had lost all interest in the war. He oversaw Bulgarian surrender but resigned on 28 November 1918 after Romania occupied the Dobruja region.

Malinov briefly returned at the head of a further Democratic Party government in 1931, although his administration proved short-lived. This government sought to improve Bulgaria's relations with her neighbours and to this end oversaw the arrest of a number of prominent Macedonians, although ultimately Malinov's failing health meant that it was a short-lived administration.

He died on 20 March 1938 in Sofia.

One of the main boulevards in Sofia's Mladost district bears the name of Aleksandar Malinov, as does the adjacent Aleksandar Malinov Metro Station on Sofia Metro's Line 1.

He was married to the suffragist and women's rights activist Julia Malinova.

Political offices
Preceded by Petar Gudev	Prime Minister of Bulgaria; 1908–1911	Succeeded by Ivan Geshov
Preceded by Vasil Radoslavov	Prime Minister of Bulgaria; 1918	Succeeded by Teodor Teodorov
Preceded by Andrey Lyapchev	Prime Minister of Bulgaria; 1931	Succeeded by Nikola Mushanov
Preceded by Stefan Paprikov	Minister of Foreign Affairs of Bulgaria; 1910–1911	Succeeded by Ivan Geshov
Preceded by Vasil Radoslavov	Minister of Foreign Affairs of Bulgaria; 1918	Succeeded by Teodor Teodorov
Preceded by Atanas Burov	Minister of Foreign Affairs of Bulgaria; 1931	Succeeded by Nikola Mushanov
