= Vasil Radoslavov =

Prime Minister of Bulgaria (1854–1929)

Vasil Radoslavov Васил Радославов
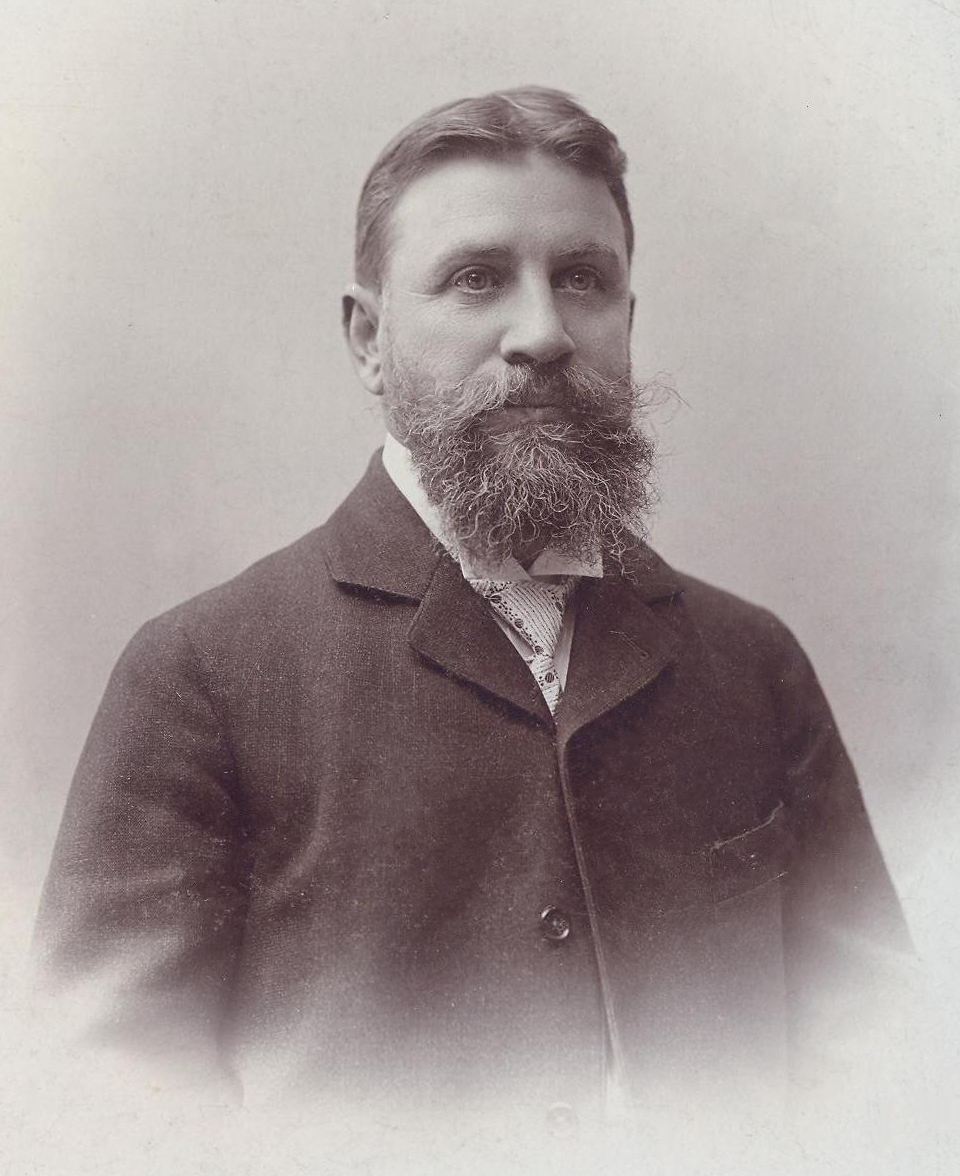

7th Prime Minister of Bulgaria
- In office 28 August 1886 – 10 July 1887
- Monarchs: Alexander (28 August 1886 – 7 September 1886); Regency (7 September 1886 – 29 April 1887); Ferdinand (29 April 1887 – 10 July 1887)
- Preceded by: Petko Karavelov
- Succeeded by: Konstantin Stoilov
- In office 17 July 1913 – 21 June 1918
- Monarch: Ferdinand
- Preceded by: Stoyan Danev
- Succeeded by: Aleksandar Malinov

Minister of Justice
- In office 11 July 1884 – 24 July 1886
- Prime Minister: Petko Karavelov
- Preceded by: Konstantin Pomyanov
- Succeeded by: Gavril Oroshakov
- In office 21 August 1886 – 24 August 1886
- Prime Minister: Kliment Turnovski
- Preceded by: Gavril Oroshakov
- Succeeded by: Gavril Oroshakov
- In office 31 May 1894 – 29 September 1894
- Prime Minister: Konstantin Stoilov
- Preceded by: Konstantin Pomyanov
- Succeeded by: Petar Peshev

Personal details
- Born: 27 July 1854 Lovech, Ottoman Empire
- Died: 21 October 1929 (aged 75) Berlin, Weimar Republic
- Resting place: Sofia, Bulgaria
- Party: Liberal Party (until 1887); Liberal Party (Radoslavists) (1887–1920)

Vasil Hristov Radoslavov (Bulgarian: Васил Христов Радославов) (27 July 1854 – 21 October 1929) was a leading Bulgarian liberal politician who twice served as prime minister. He was premier of the country throughout most of World War I.

== Biography ==
Born in Lovech, Radoslavov studied law at Heidelberg and became a supporter of Germany from then on. He became a political figure in 1884 when he was appointed Minister of Justice in the cabinet of Petko Karavelov, also holding the position under Archbishop Kliment Turnovski. He succeeded Karavelov as prime minister in 1886 and being aged 32 years, was the youngest person to have ever been Prime Minister of Bulgaria. Additionally he was the Minister of Finance.

His brief reign was marked by corruption and ultimately led to a split in the Liberal Party, with a Radoslav Liberal Party formed in 1887 as a grouping for right-wing liberals. Radoslavov was noted for his strong support for friendship with Austria-Hungary.

He returned to government in 1899 as Minister for Internal Affairs in the government of Todor Ivanchov, although after this he remained out of office until 1913 when he returned as prime minister. His anti-Russian rhetoric impressed Ferdinand who worked closely with Radoslavov in shaping foreign policy. He secured a large loan from Germany and Austria-Hungary in July 1914 but also managed to delay Bulgarian entry into the War. His popularity fell after Bulgaria officially entered the War, however, with money and resources now directed fully to the war effort. As prime minister he oversaw the liberation of Southern Dobruja and the occupation of Northern Dobruja in 1916 with the aid of German General August von Mackensen, although the move lost him some support from the German government as they wanted some of the territory for themselves.

His government remained in office until June 1918, when the more moderate Aleksandar Malinov was recalled in the hope of brokering a favourable peace deal, with Radoslavov blamed for the failure of Bulgaria to gain full control of Northern Dobruja in the Treaty of Bucharest (the southern part of Northern Dobruja was ceded to Bulgaria, while the northern part of the region was placed under joint Bulgarian, Turkish, German and Austrian-Hungarian administration). By this point the Radoslavov government had become a by-word for corruption and subservience to Germany.

Radoslavov fled Bulgaria after the war, going into exile in Germany. In 1922 the regime of Aleksandar Stamboliyski sentenced him to death in absentia for his part in the defeat. He was pardoned in 1929, the same year in which he died whilst still in exile in Berlin, Weimar Republic, on 21 October. On 3 November, he was buried in Sofia.

== Gallery ==
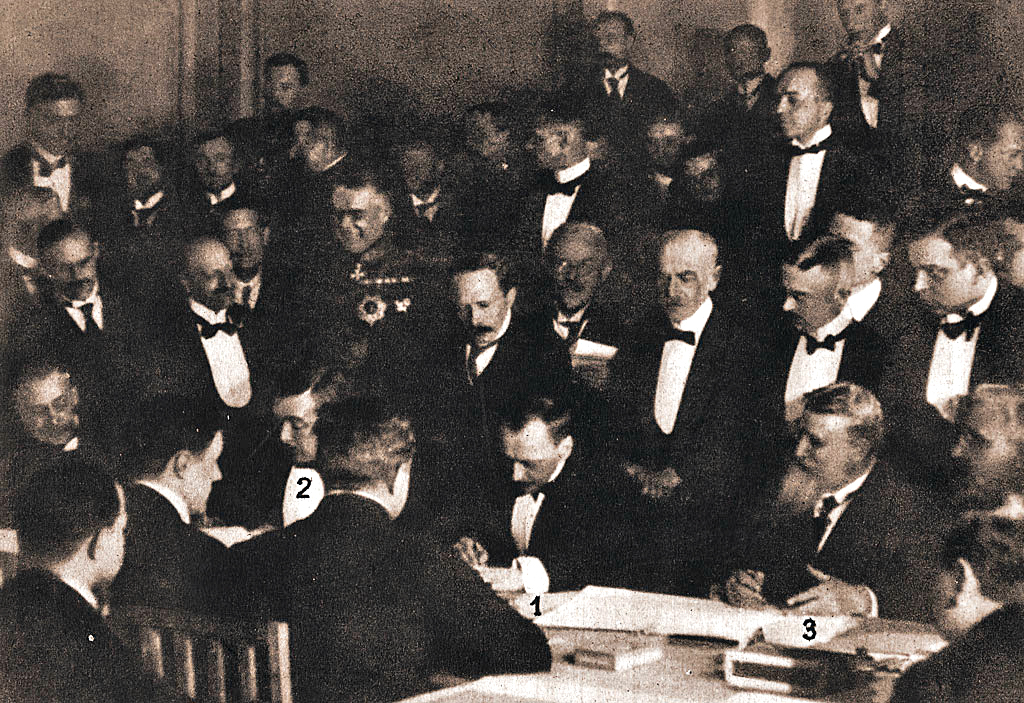
Signing of the Peace treaty with Ukraine (9 February 1918) by 1. Count Ottokar Czernin, 2. Richard von Kühlmann and 3. Vasil Radoslavov

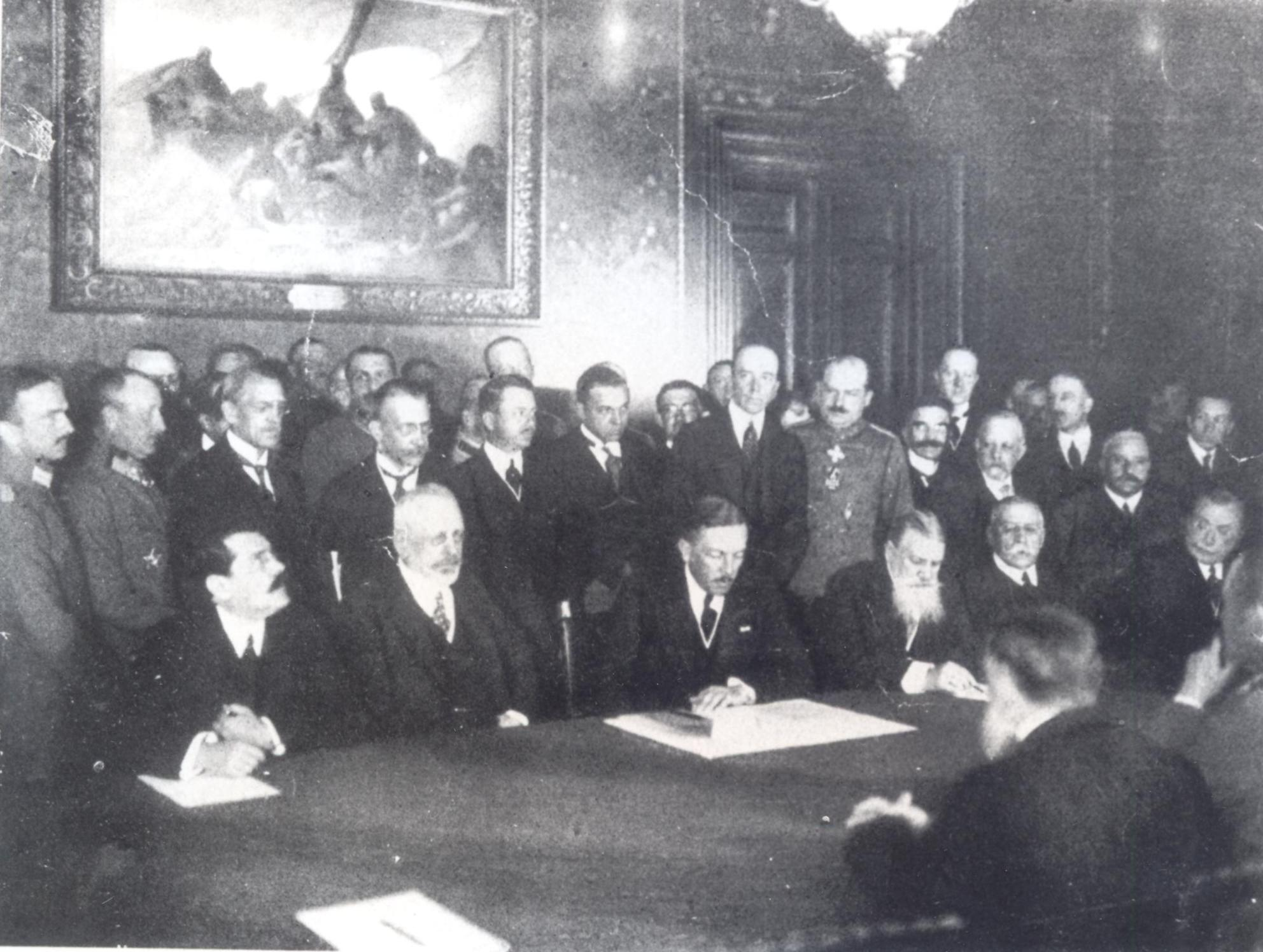
Picture taken at the signing of the Peace treaty with Romania (7 May 1918). Vasil Radoslavov is fourth from the left, sitting

== See also ==
- Liberalism and radicalism in Bulgaria

Political offices
Preceded by Petko Karavelov	Prime Minister of Bulgaria; 1886–1887	Succeeded by Konstantin Stoilov
Preceded by Stoyan Danev	Prime Minister of Bulgaria; 1913–1918	Succeeded by Aleksandar Malinov
Preceded by Konstantin Pomyanov	Minister of Justice; 1884–1886	Succeeded by Gavril Oroshakov
Preceded by Gavril Oroshakov	Minister of Justice; 1886	Succeeded by Gavril Oroshakov
Preceded by Konstantin Pomyanov	Minister of Justice; 1894	Succeeded by Petar Peshev
Preceded by Nikola Genadiev	Minister of Foreign Affairs; 1913–1918	Succeeded by Aleksandar Malinov
