= 1880 Bulgarian parliamentary election =

Parliamentary elections held in Bulgaria in January and February 1880

- January and February 1880
- All 162 seats in the National Assembly; 82 seats needed for a majority
Party	Leader	Seats	+/–
Liberal Party	Dragan Tsankov; Petko Karavelov; Petko Slaveykov	103	−37
Conservative Party	Kliment of Tarnovo	50	+20
This lists parties that won seats. See the complete results below.
Prime Minister before	Prime Minister after
Kliment of Tarnovo; Kliment I (Con.)	Dragan Tsankov; Tsankov I (Lib.)

Parliamentary elections were held in Bulgaria in January and February 1880 to elect members of the II Ordinary National Assembly. The result was another victory for the pro-constitution liberals.

== Results ==
Low voter turnout in some constituencies led to the results being invalidated and the elections re-run. Unlike in former elections, the government did not attempt to influence the result, resulting in the opposition Liberal Party retaining their majority in the National Assembly. Of the 162 seats, the Liberal Party won 103 and the Conservative Party won 50. When the newly elected Assembly convened, Liberal Party member Petko Karavelov was elected Chairperson.

Party	Seats	+/–
Liberal Party	103	–37
Conservative Party	50	+20
Others	9	–
Total	162	–8
Source: The Times

Following the election the government resigned, but incumbent Prime Minister Kliment Turnovski was asked to form another government. Ultimately Dragan Tsankov formed a government and became Prime Minister on 8 April.

== Aftermath ==
After the election Prince Alexander Battenberg appointed Dragan Tsankov as the leader of a new govrernment. With a majority in Parliament, the liberals began implementing reforms: the country's judiciary was formed, with the establishment of the Chamber of Audit, the taxation system was overhauled with several laws and the country joined the ITU. There was an attempt to unify Bulgaria with Eastern Rumelia, but it failed to gather international support. The government struggled to deal with the regulation of property rights for Turkish landowners, expelled after the war and rebel activities. The country also faced competing international pressure from Russia and Austria to build one of two railroad lines as well as sailing rights on the Danube. The Assembly voted against the Austrian proposal for the latter, which led to an international crisis and Tsankov was forced to resign.

Finance minister Petko Karavelov was appointed to lead another liberal government. An agricultural reform was implemented, however several important state institutions hadn't been formed and there was division within the liberals between Tsankov's moderated and Karavelov's hardliners. Bulgaria's international isolation and the death of the Russian emperor Alexander II allowed Battenberg to orchestrate a coup in April 1881.

Battenberg appointed a new government led by the imperial Russian general Johan Ehrnrooth and laid out several conditions for him to remain on the throne, notably rule through royal decree, constitutional amendments (effectively suspending it) and expanded executive powers for a period of seven years. Military judicial courts were formed, effectively giving the monarch control over the judiciary, press censorship was implemented and a snap election was called to approve the amendments. This period is known as the regime of powers.
