= 1879 Bulgarian parliamentary election =

- 30 September–7 October 1879
- All 170 seats in the National Assembly; 86 seats needed for a majority
- Turnout: 32.0%
Party	Leader	Seats
Liberals	Dragan Tsankov; Petko Karavelov; Petko Slaveykov	140
Conservatives	Todor Burmov	30
This lists parties that won seats. See the complete results below.
Prime Minister before	Prime Minister after
Todor Burmov; Burmov (Cons.)	Kliment of Tarnovo; Kliment I (Cons.)

Parliamentary elections were held in Bulgaria between 30 September and 7 October 1879 to elect members of the I Ordinary National Assembly. The result was a victory for the Liberal Party, which won 140 of the 170 seats. Voter turnout was 32.0%.

== Results ==
Party	Seats
Liberal Party	140
Conservative Party	30
Total	170
Source: Nohlen & Stöver

== Aftermath ==
While generally pro-Russian in its foreign policy, the Burmov government resisted Russian pressure in several sectors like banking and railroad construction. Having failed to win a majority in the legislative election, the conservatives were defeated in a vote of no-confidence by the pro-constitution liberals.

There was significant pressure from Russia to form a coalition government between the Liberals and Conservatives, however Petko Karavelov refused to do so. In response, Prince Alexander appointed another entirely Conservative government led by Kliment of Tarnovo, scheduled snap elections for 1880 and began seeking Russian support for his goals of amending and suspending the constitution.
