= 1884 Bulgarian parliamentary election =

- 27 May 1884
- All 171 seats in the National Assembly; 86 seats needed for a majority
Party	Leader	Seats	+/–
Hardline Liberals	Petko Karavelov; Petko Slaveykov	100	New
Conservatives and Moderate Liberals	Konstantin Stoilov; Dragan Tsankov	71	+24
This lists parties that won seats. See the complete results below.
Prime Minister before	Prime Minister after
Dragan Tsankov; Tsankov III (Moderate Liberals + Conservatives)	Petko Karavelov; Karavelov II (Hardline Liberals)

Parliamentary elections were held in Bulgaria on 27 May 1884 to elect members of the IV Ordinary National Assembly. The result was a victory for the hardline liberals, which won 100 of the 171 seats. Voter turnout was 28.9%. Further members were elected from Eastern Rumelia between 11 and 18 May 1886, after it became part of Bulgaria in 1885.

== Results ==
Several MPs were elected in more than one constituency and were required to choose which one to represent when the Assembly convened. By-elections were held on the 3rd of June. The elected Assembly initially consisted of 10-15 conservatives and over 130 liberals. 130-140 Liberal MPs signed a party declaration against the conservative constitutional amendments, with roughly 90-100 hardliners and 30-40 moderates. Following the election there was a failed attempt to form a government with both liberal factions.

When the Assembly convened, the ruling moderate Liberals and Conservatives supported hardliner Stefan Stambolov for Chairman of Parliament, while the hardliners supported Petko Karavelov. The latter became Chairman with 99 to 66 votes, 5 MPs were absent. Karavelov was elected as PM soon afterwards and Stambolov succeeded him as Chairman.

Party	Seats
Liberal Party	100
Conservatives and Moderate Liberals	71
Total	171
Source: Nohlen & Stöver

== Aftermath ==
This was the last Bulgarian election held under the traditional divide between liberals and conservatives.

After Karavelov became PM, the moderate liberals and Russophile conservatives formally split into the Tsankovist Party. Karavelov's government oversaw Bulgaria's unification and the subsequent Serbo-Bulgarian War. The Stambolovist Liberals left the party in 1886. The government and Prince Alexander were overthrown in the 1886 coup, however the coup failed to gather support and Karavelov returned as the leader of a national unity government three days later. Four days later Vasil Radoslavov succeeded him as PM. New elections were called for a Grand National Assembly to elect a new monarch due to the abdication of Prince Alexander in the aftermath of the coup. The Stambolovist liberals dominated Bulgarian politics until 1894.
