= 1899 Bulgarian parliamentary election =

- 25 April 1899
- All 169 seats in the National Assembly; 85 seats needed for a majority
Party	Leader	Seats	+/–
United Liberals (LP-NLP)	Vasil Radoslavov; Dimitar Petkov	119	+109
Other Liberals	–	15	+15
Karavelist Liberals	Petko Karavelov	10	+8
Tsankovist Liberals	Stoyan Danev	10	+9
Socialists	Yanko Sakazov; Dimitar Blagoev	4	+2
People's Party	Konstantin Stoilov	2	−148
Russophiles	–	2	+2
Unionists	Konstantin Velichkov	1	+1
Conservatives	–	1	+1
Independents	–	5	+5
This lists parties that won seats. See the complete results below.
Prime Minister before	Prime Minister after
Dimitar Grekov; Grekov (Ind. + Radoslavists)	Dimitar Grekov; Grekov (Ind. + Radoslavists)

Parliamentary elections were held in Bulgaria on 25 April 1899 to elect members of the X Ordinary National Assembly. The result was a victory for the ruling United Liberals, which won 119 of the 169 seats. Voter turnout was 49%.

== Results ==
The initial results were approximately: 90 United Liberals, 20 Karavelist Liberals, 30 Tsankovists, Populists and Unionists, 5 Socialists and 5 others. Several MPs were elected in more than one constituency and were required to choose which one to represent when the Assembly convened, resulting in 17 of the 169 seats being vacant. A further 21 seats were annulled and two MPs died. Snap elections were held on 19 September and 5 December 1899.

Party	Seats
United Liberals (Note: 89 Radoslavists Liberals, 19 Stambolovist Liberals, 11 from the "ruling, governing or united Liberal party")	119
Other Liberals (Note: 11 Undetermined Liberals, 3 Old Liberals, 1 Liberal-Constitutionalist)	15
Karavelist Liberals	10
Tsankovists (Note: 8 Tsankovists, 2 Tsankovists-Unionists)	10
Workers' Social Democratic Party	4
People's Party	2
Russophiles (Note: The prominent Russophile parties were the Tsankovists, the Unionists and the Karavelists)	2
Unionists	1
Conservatives	1
Independents	5
Total	169
Source: National Statistical Institute

== Aftermath ==
Grekov's government continued its term, however there was a power struggle between the Radoslavists and Stambolovists within the newly united Liberal Party. After by-elections were held, the Radoslavists had a majority on their own and Grekov was forced to resign. He refounded the People's Liberal Party, which he led until his death in 1901. Radoslavist Todor Ivanchov succeeded him as PM in October 1899.

In order to address the ongoing economic crisis, the Grekov and Ivanchov governments privatized the railroad stations in Southern Bulgaria, decreased pensions and salaries and the reintroduced the tithe, with the latter resulting in mass peasant unrest and the founding of BZNS as a political party. The police forces under Radoslavov's Interior ministry brutally suppressed the riots. The assassination of Ștefan Mihăileanu by the VMOK resulted in a diplomatic crisis with Romania. In November 1900 Ivanchov resigned after a crisis in the ruling party. He remained as the leader of an interim government, however he resigned again after a conflict with interior minister Racho Petrov, who succeeded him as interim PM. Ivanchov, Radoslavov and Dimitar Tonchev were later arrested for corruption and constitutional violations during their terms as ministers, by the First State Court in 1903.
