= Gayda =

Gayda may refer to:

- Gayda (newspaper), a 19th-century Bulgarian-language newspaper published in Istanbul
- Gayda (surname), a surname
- Gayda, the Turkish spelling of gaida, a bagpipe from the Balkans and Southeast Europe
