= 1879 Eastern Rumelian election =

- 7 October 1879
- 36 of the 56 seats in the Regional Assembly; 29 seats needed for a majority
| Party | Seats |
|---|---|
| Bulgarians | 32 |
| Greeks | 2 |
| Turks | 2 |
This lists parties that won seats. See the complete results below.

Parliamentary elections were held for the first time in Eastern Rumelia on 7 October 1879.

== Background ==
The autonomous region of Eastern Rumelia, established by the Treaty of Berlin and the Eastern Rumelian Constitution, was headed by a Sublime Porte-chosen Governor-general who led and, alongside the Sultan, appointed the Directorate (government) of the province. He additionally appointed 10 members of the legislature, the Regional Assembly, with a further 10 representatives of the judiciary, ethnic and religious minorities serving as ex officio members. The remaining 36 MPs were elected for 4 year terms, with half the seats up for reelection every 2 years. The Assembly also elected an additional legislative body, the Standing Committee.

== Results ==
As the election was held on a non-partisan basis, candidates were divided predominantly on ethnic lines. 32 of the elected and 40 of the total MPs were ethnic Bulgarians.

| Party | Seats |
|---|---|
| Bulgarians | 32 |
| Greeks | 2 |
| Turks | 2 |
| Total | 36 |
Source: Statelova

== Aftermath ==
Although initially non-partisan, a dominant faction led by the Chairman of the Standing Committee Ivan Geshov began to form. By the 1881 election most of its opposition had consolidated into the Liberal Party.
