= Liberal Party (Eastern Rumelia) =

Political party in Eastern Rumelia between 1881 and 1885

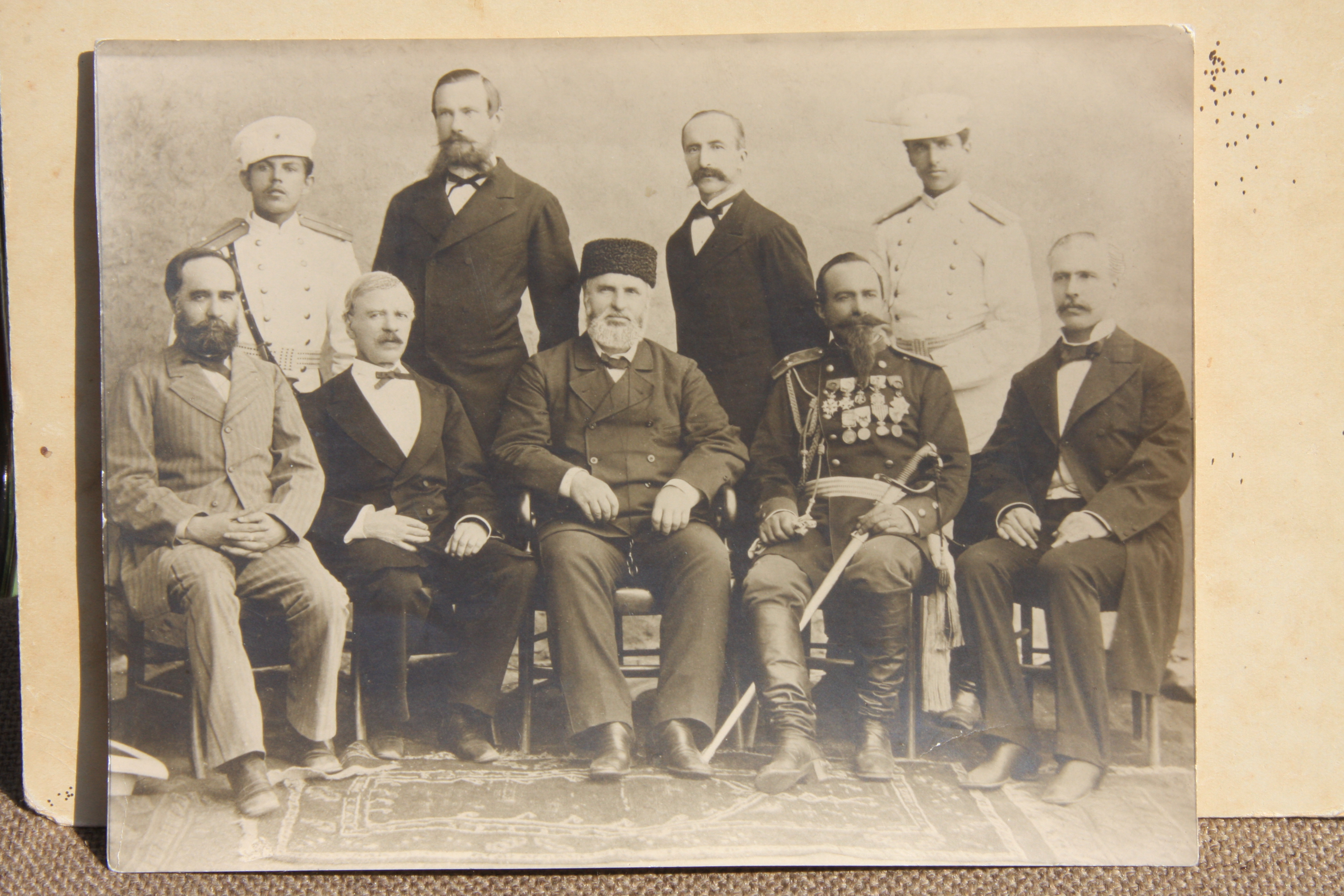
Eastern Rumelia's first Directorate, seated: Yoakim Gruev, Gavril Krastevich, Alexander Bogoridi, Viktor Vitalis, Todor Kesyakov, standing: Naum Nikushev, Adolf Schmidt, Georgi Valkovich, Todor Stoev

The Liberal Party, also known as Governmental Party (Bulgarian: Либерална партия, romanized: Liberalna partiya, Bulgarian: Казионна партия, romanized: Kazionna partiya), was a political party active in the autonomous region of Eastern Rumelia between 1881 and 1885, when the region joined the Principality of Bulgaria. Alongside the People's Party, it was one of the two major political parties in the province.

Its leaders included Georgi Stranski, Stoyan Chomakov, Georgi Benev, Ivan Salabashev, Ivan Hadzhipetrov, Todor Kesyakov and others. Following the 1881 Bulgarian coup by Prince Alexander, the party welcomed exiled leaders of the Bulgarian Liberal Party - Petko Karavelov, Petko Slaveykov, Zahari Stoyanov and Hristo Slaveykov. It was associated with the newspaper Yuzhna Bulgaria.

The Liberals supported incorporating Eastern Rumelia into Bulgaria. The newly established party achieved significant success in the 1881 Regional Assembly election. After the 1883 election the entire Private council or Directorate (the government of Eastern Rumelia) was made up of Liberal party members, and Stranski became chairman of the Regional Assembly. As the first party in power it was also known as the Ruling or Governmental party. It was supported by the region's first head of state Alexander Bogoridi. Following the Bulgarian unification, its leaders mostly merged into the People's Liberal Party of Stefan Stambolov.
