= 1894 Bulgarian parliamentary election =

- 11 September 1894
- All 155 seats in the National Assembly; 78 seats needed for a majority
Party	Leader	Seats
Unionists	Ivan Geshov	40
Tsankovist Liberals	Dragan Tsankov	40
Radoslavist Liberals	Vasil Radoslavov	37
Conservatives	Konstantin Stoilov	26
Karavelist Liberals	Petko Karavelov	8
Socialists	Yanko Sakazov	4
This lists parties that won seats. See the complete results below.
Prime Minister before	Prime Minister after
Konstantin Stoilov; Stoilov II (Cons.+NP+LP(R))	Konstantin Stoilov; Stoilov III (Cons.+NP)

Parliamentary elections were held in Bulgaria on 11 September 1894 to elect members of the VIII Ordinary National Assembly. The result was a victory for the government-aligned anti-Stambolovist parties.

== Background ==
Stefan Stambolov and his People's Liberal Party had been in power since 1887 until Prince Ferdinand surprisingly accepted one of his numerous resignations in May 1894 and appointed a government of the United Legal Opposition, led by Konstantin Stoilov, in the hopes that a shift away from the pro-Austrian People's Liberals would achieve him recognition from Russia as the Prince of Bulgaria. Despite limited democratization reforms and amnesty, popular opposition leader Petko Karavelov remained imprisoned until after the election and Stambolovist candidates were not allowed to run.

== Results ==
Party	Seats
Unionists	40
Tsankovist Liberals	40
Radoslavist Liberals	37
Conservatives	26
Karavelist Liberals	8
Socialists	4
Total	155
Source: Liberty Socialist (Note: Slightly different seat count with 90 "Russophiles" (Unionists, Tsankovists and Karavelists), 38 Radoslavists, 25 Conservatives and 2 Socialists)

== Aftermath ==
The Radoslavist Liberals left the government in December 1894. Stoilov's term saw the resolution of the country's 10-year long international isolation and Ferdinand was recognized as Prince of Bulgaria. Stoilov's supporters, the Unionists and Conservatives, consolidated into the NP and this period saw the formation or reinvigoration of the country's other major pre-WW1 political parties - the DP, LP and PLP, in addition to Stambolov's NLP, which he led until his assassination in July 1895.
