= Ehrnrooth Government =

- 5th Cabinet of Bulgaria

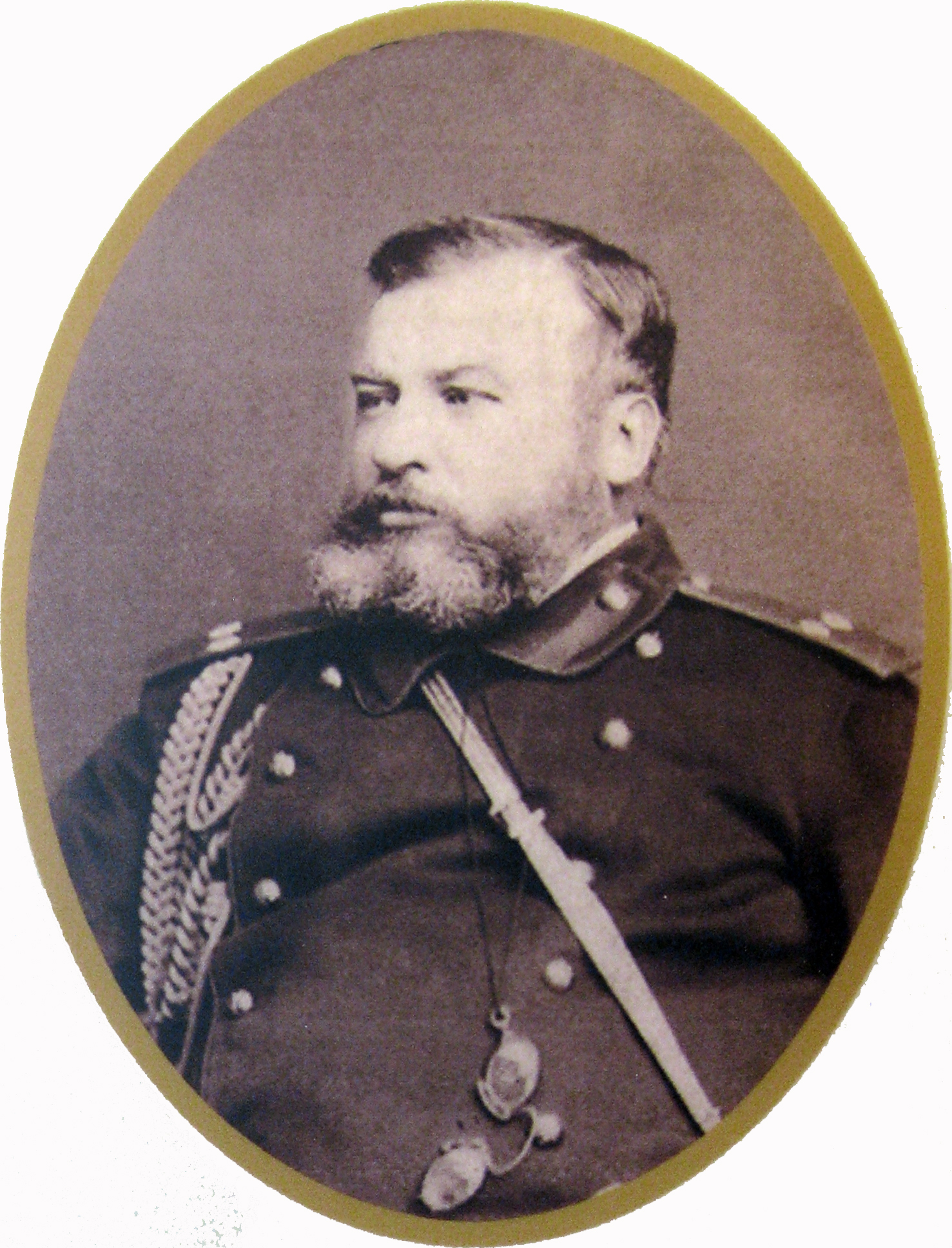
- Date formed: 27 April 1881
- Date dissolved: 7 July 1881

People and organisations
- Knyaz: Alexander of Battenberg
- Head of government: Johan Ehrnrooth
- Member party: Imperial Russian Army

History
- Predecessor: First Karavelov Government
- Successor: Shesto Government

The government of Kasimir Ehrnrooth was the fifth government of the Principality of Bulgaria, appointed by Knyaz Alexander I of Battenberg with Decree No. 287 on April 27, 1881. It governed until 1 July 1881, when it was succeeded by the first government without a prime minister, which was directly ruled by the Bulgarian monarch, the so-called Sixth Government.

== Policies ==
The cabinet formed on 27 April 1881, headed by General Johan Casimir Ehrnrooth, was formed by supporters of the Knyaz, after the successful coup d'état. The government's goal was to prepare the conditions for the full abolishment of the Tarnovo Constitution and the concentration of all power in the hands of Alexander I of Battenberg. The country was therefore divided into five regions, each led by an extraordinary commissioner.On May 11, 1881, the monarch officially announced his conditions for remaining on the throne: extraordinary powers for seven years and rule by decrees; the budget voted in 1881 to be in effect for 1882 as well; Grand National Assembly to review the constitution based on the newly established institutions and previous experience.

Just before the convening of the Grand National Assembly, military courts were organized by Alexander's decree to deal with "crimes of the executive and police authorities, having the character of incitement, rebellion, and disobedience to the lawfully established authorities." The severe sentences provided for in the decree paralyzed the administrative and police authorities, as well as the liberal press. Under these conditions, the government and the monarch achieved a complete victory in the 1881 elections for the 2nd Grand National Assembly. Upon its first session in the city of Svishtov, the few elected members of the Liberal Party were not allowed to attend. The constitution was abolished, the Knyaz's demands were met, and the so-called Regime of Full Powers was introduced in the country. The idea of repealing the constitution was approved by the West and Russia. Its commissioners in Bulgaria became conduits for the Knyaz's policy. The majority of the Bulgarian population opposed the coup and the repeal of the constitution. Alexander's popularity fell sharply, and Russophobic sentiments intensified. Immediately after the Grand National Assembly completed its work, the government of General Casimir Ehrnrooth resigned.

== Cabinet ==
Although the Conservative Party was the main political force behind the coup, the Ehrnrooth Government included a representative of the deposed liberal government and non-party members. The military and interior ministries (along with the prime minister's post) were in the hands of Russian General Casimir Ehrnrooth.

Cabinet members
Portfolio	Minister	Took office	Left office	Party
Prime Minister	Casimir Ehrnrooth	27 April 1881	1 July 1881	Imperial Russian Army
Minister of the Interior	Casimir Ehrnrooth	27 April 1881	1 July 1881	Imperial Russian Army
Minister of Foreign Affairs and Religion	Nikola Stoychev	27 April 1881	1 July 1881	Conservative party
Minister of National Education	Mihail Sarafov	27 April 1881	29 April 1881	Liberal party
Minister of Finance	Georgi Zhelyazkovich	27 April 1881	1 July 1881	Conservative party
Minister of Justice	Porphoriy Stamatov	27 April 1881	1 July 1881	Independent
Minister of War	Casimir Ehrnrooth	27 April 1881	1 July 1881	Imperial Russian Army

=== Changes in the Cabinet ===
Cabinet members
Portfolio	Minister	Took office	Left office	Party
Minister of National Education	Konstantin Jireček	29 April 1881	1 July 1881	Conservative party

== Notable Events ==
- 14 - 21 June 1881 – Elections for the 2nd Grand National Assembly, accompanied by violence and falsifications in many areas.
- 1 July 1881 – The 2nd Grand National Assembly, convened in Svishtov, voted on the powers requested by the Knyaz.
