= First Dragan Tsankov Government =

Third government of the Principality of Bulgaria (Mar–Nov 1880)

- 3rd Cabinet of Bulgaria

- Date formed: 26 March 1880
- Date dissolved: 28 November 1880

People and organisations
- Knyaz: Alexander of Battenberg
- Head of government: Dragan Tsankov
- Member party: Liberal party

History
- Election: 1880
- Legislature term: 2nd National Assembly (23 March 1880 - 18 December 1880)
- Predecessor: First Kliment Government
- Successor: First Karavelov Government

The Government of Dragan Tsankov was the third government of the Principality of Bulgaria and the first to be led by the Liberal Party. It was appointed by Decree No. 135 of 26 March 1880 by Knyaz Alexander I of Battenberg and governed until 28 November 1880, after which it was succeeded by Petko Karavelov's first government.

== Policies ==
Relying on the Liberal Party's full majority in the National Assembly, Tsankov's government regulated and built the judiciary and financial administration from the ground up. Finance Minister Petko Karavelov organized the Court of Audit and the Statistical Bureau and passed laws on the stamp tax, the tithe, and the preservation of other taxes from the Ottoman era. Under pressure from Russian bankers, the government submitted a bill to parliament to convert the National Bank of Bulgaria into a joint-stock company, but later withdrew it to maintain control over credit in the country.

The government's most pressing domestic political issues are related to the confiscation of property from Turkish landowners who were displaced during the Russo-Turkish War of 1877-1878 and the ongoing unrest among the Turkish population in the eastern parts of the Principality. The two issues led to strained relations with the suzerain, the Ottoman Empire, which worsened further after the Bulgarian government joined (in violation of its vassal status, as regulated by the Treaty of Berlin) the International Telegraph Agency.

In May 1880 under Tsankov's government, the Principality took its first steps towards unification with Eastern Rumelia. Diplomatic probes in London and among the other Great Powers, however, yielded a negative result, and the government abandoned the idea.

=== Conflict with Austria-Hungary ===
Tsankov's government was under dual pressure from Austria-Hungary and Russia to implement alternative railway projects. The Russian project for a line from Sofia to the Danube (Svishtov or Ruse) was rejected in favor of completing the railway from Istanbul to Central Europe in the section between Vakarel and the Serbian border, which the Bulgarian state was obligated to build under the Treaty of Berlin. Disagreements with Austria over the route and operating rights of the planned railway line however were hindering construction.

According to Article 53 of the Treaty of Berlin, a unified regulation for navigation on the Danube from the Iron Gates to Galati should be created. A dispute arises over whether this should be done by a European commission or, as Austria proposes, assigned to a sub-committee composed of delegates from Austria, Serbia, Romania, and Bulgaria. Romania is in favor of a pan-European body, while Austria is trying to draw Bulgaria into its draft regulation, which would give it control over shipping on the Danube. In correspondence with the Austrian diplomatic agent Count Kevenhüller, Tsankov assured him that Bulgaria would support Austria. However, when it came to voting, contrary to his promises, the Bulgarian delegate at the Galatz negotiations, voted against. Kevenhüller complained to the prince, who brought the incident to the Council of Ministers with an order for measures against the compromising behavior of the Prime Minister, and at the end of November 1880 Dragan Tsankov was forced to resign.

== Cabinet ==
The cabinet, headed by Dragan Tsankov, was formed by members of the Liberal Party and a Russian general at the head of the Ministry of War. Programmatically, it reflects the interests of various layers of the Bulgarian small and medium bourgeoisie, united by common democratic ideas. The Liberal Party was not so united, and it was divided into two main branches: the Moderate, led by Dragan Tsankov, which was inclined to political compromises with the Conservative Party, and another branch that united the extreme liberals Petko Karavelov and Petko Slaveykov. They firmly upheld the liberal principles and the program for the development of the Bulgarian state. The idea of national unification became a key point in the foreign policy of the radical liberals. A small group of radical liberals led by Stefan Stambolov and Zahari Stoyanov acted as mediators between the two branches.

Portfolio	Minister	Took office	Left office	Party
Prime Minister	Dragan Tsankov	26 March 1880	28 November 1880	Liberal party
Minister of the Interior	Georgi Tishev	26 March 1880	28 November 1880	Liberal party
Minister of Foreign Affairs and Religion	Dragan Tsankov	26 March 1880	28 November 1880	Liberal party
Minister of National Education	Ivan Gyuzelev	26 March 1880	28 November 1880	Liberal party
Minister of Finance	Petko Karavelov	26 March 1880	28 November 1880	Liberal party
Minister of Justice	Hristo Stoyanov	26 March 1880	28 November 1880	Liberal party
Minister of War	Pavel Pleve	26 March 1880	3 April 1880	Russian Military

=== Changes in the Cabinet ===
Portfolio	Minister	Took office	Left office	Party
Minister of War	Johan Casimir Ehrnrooth	4 April 1880	28 November 1880	Russian Military

== Notable Events ==
- 24 March 1880 – Two months after the electoral victory of the Liberals, Knyaz Alexander of Battenberg appointed a government headed by their leader, Dragan Tsankov.
- 26 April 1880 – The National Assembly grants the Minister of War, Casimir Ehrnrooth, extraordinary powers, with which the general deals with the Turkish bands in Eastern Bulgaria.
- 10 May 1880 – The Parliament passed a law on the administrative division of the Principality, which abolished the governorates established during the Provisional Russian Administration and reduced the number of districts from 31 to 21.
- 2 June 1880 – A law is passed on the organization of the judiciary in the Principality of Bulgaria, regulating the functions of the peace judges, the district and appellate courts, the Supreme Cassation Court, the prosecution, and the investigation.
- 4 June 1880 – A law was published to introduce the Bulgarian lev as the official currency.
- 24 November 1880 – The government passes a law through the National Assembly to improve the condition of the agricultural population in the lordly and chiflik lands. The villagers who cultivate the land receive a free right to own it. The state must pay compensation to the Turkish owners who fled. However the Liberals will fail to comply with the law.
- November 25, 1880 – A law for the recruitment of new recruits in the Bulgarian army, published on this date, introduces universal compulsory military service.
- November 28, 1880 – Dragan Tsankov resigns as Prime Minister. A government led by Petko Karavelov was formed.
