= First Karavelov Government =

Fourth government of the Principality of Bulgaria (1880–1881)

First Petko Karavelov Government
- 4th Cabinet of Bulgaria

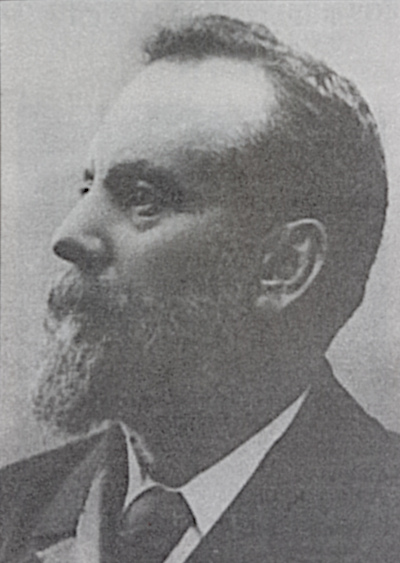
- Date formed: 28 November 1880
- Date dissolved: 27 April 1881

People and organisations
- Knyaz: Alexander of Battenberg
- Head of government: Petko Karavelov
- Member party: Liberal party

History
- Election: 1880
- Legislature term: 2nd National Assembly (23 March 1880 - 18 December 1880)
- Predecessor: First Dragan Tsankov Government
- Successor: Ehrnrooth Government

The First Petko Karavelov Government was the second consecutive government of the Liberal Party and the fourth government to lead the Principality of Bulgaria. It was appointed by Decree No. 735 of November 28, 1880 by Knyaz Alexander I of Battenberg and governed the country until the coup of April 27, 1881, after which Knyaz Battenberg appointed a government led by Casimir Ehrnrooth.

== Policies ==
The new government continued the active legislative work of its predecessors. The Law on Bulgarian Citizenship and the Law on Improving the Situation of the Agricultural Population on the Master's and Chiflik Lands have been adopted. The mistakes made in resolving a number of economic problems, as well as the contradictions within the Liberal Party regarding the practice of governance, weakened their political influence in the country. The two branches within the Liberal Party (Moderate and Extreme), finally emerge on the scene.

The rift between the Knyaz and Karavelov's cabinet deepened with regard to domestic policy. A number of necessary state institutions have not yet been created, and inter-party squabbles made the 2nd National Assembly an object of ridicule, with politicians' erratic behavior reinforcing the belief abroad that they are incapable of governing their own country. The judicial administration was corrupt, and roads and bridges were crumbling. Due to the lack of an effective police force, larger armed groups were forming across the country, supposedly for self-defense, but in reality for attacks, often on Turkish villages. The Knyaz was forced to send the Minister of War, Ehrnrooth, to restore order.

In its foreign policy, Karavelov's government fell into international isolation. Bulgarian-Turkish relations have become strained due to the government's attempts to pursue an independent policy. Strong Russian influence in Bulgaria and the unresolved issues with the Ruse-Varna railway line (in which significant English capital was invested) led to Britain supporting the Turkish landowners in resolving the land issue. Taking advantage of the contradictions between the two branches of the Liberal Party and the assassination of Emperor Alexander II in March 1881, Knyaz Alexander I of Battenberg staged a coup d'état in April, dismissing the government and assigning General Casimir Ehrnrooth to form an interim government.

== Cabinet ==
After Dragan Tsankov resigns as Prime Minister and Minister of Foreign Affairs on 28 November 1880, Petko Karavelov heads a new cabinet composed of members of the Liberal Party (both moderate and extreme liberals) and a Russian general at the head of the Ministry of War. However, the Knyaz was not satisfied with Tsankov's remaining as Minister of the Interior and later wrote to Karavelov asking for his removal.

Portfolio	Minister	Took office	Left office	Party
Prime Minister	Petko Karavelov	28 November 1880	27 April 1881	Liberal party
Minister of the Interior	Dragan Tsankov	28 November 1880	17 December 1980	Liberal party
Minister of Foreign Affairs and Religion	Nikola Stoychev	28 November 1880	27 April 1881	Liberal party
Minister of National Education	Petko Slaveykov	28 November 1880	17 December 1980	Liberal party
Minister of Finance	Petko Karavelov	28 November 1880	27 April 1881	Liberal party
Minister of Justice	Petko Karavelov	28 November 1880	27 April 1881	Liberal party
Minister of War	Johan Casimir Ehrnrooth	28 November 1880	27 April 1881	Russian Military

=== Changes in the Cabinet ===
Portfolio	Minister	Took office	Left office	Party
Minister of the Interior	Petko Slaveykov	17 December 1880	27 April 1881	Liberal party
Minister of National Education	Mihail Sarafov	17 December 1880	27 April 1881	Liberal party

== Notable Events ==
- 10 December 1880 - The Law on the Trial of Ministers establishes accountability for representatives of the executive branch in cases of treason or abuse of power. It was used many years later to prosecute former ministers in 1903 and 1910-1913.
- 17 December 1880 – The first electoral law of the Principality of Bulgaria was promulgated, introducing a majoritarian system for the next thirty years.
- December 1880 – In violation of the constitution, the 2nd National Assembly granted legislative powers to the cabinet. According to the parliament's decision, the laws issued by the government are valid only for Karavelov's term and upon subsequent approval by the members of parliament.
- January 1881 – The Bulgarian government failed in its attempts at introducing reforms in Ottoman Macedonia in front of the powers guaranteeing the Treaty of Berlin.
- 1 March 1881 – Narodna Volya assassins kill Russian Emperor Alexander II. With his successor Emperor Alexander III, the supporters of autocracy prevailed in Russia, who were against the Tarnovo Constitution and the rule of the liberals in Bulgaria.
- 27 April 1881 – Knyaz Alexander I of Battenberg and War Minister Casimir Ehrnrooth staged a coup d'état. Karavelov's government was overthrown, and the Regime of the Mandates was established shortly thereafter.
