= The Spring of the White-Legged Woman =

Poem by Petko Slaveykov

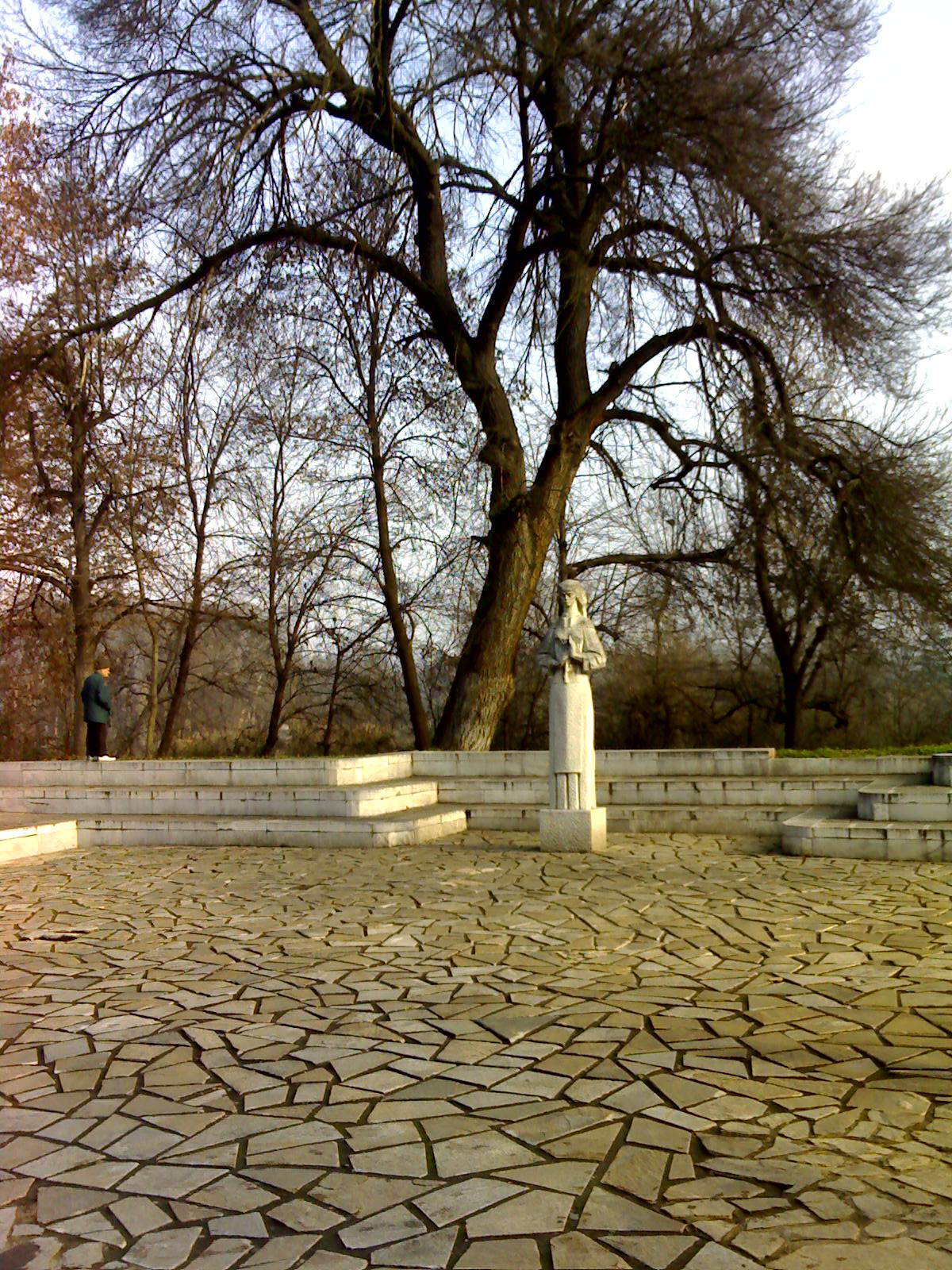
The Fountain of Gergana, Harmanli

The Spring of the White-Legged Woman (Bulgarian: Изворът на Белоногата, romanized: Izvorat na Belonogata) is a poem written in 1873 by the famous Bulgarian poet Petko Slaveykov.

The story is about a beautiful Bulgarian girl, Gergana. While she is at the fountain to get some water, an Ottoman vizier sees her, and tries to persuade her to follow him to Istanbul. She tells him that even if she followed him, she wouldn't love him as much as she loves her beloved Bulgaria, her parents, and her beloved Nicola. The vizier orders that a fountain be built to commemorate Gergana's courage. The builders, however, immure Gergana within the fountain; this ensures the durability of the fountain, which is also her memorial.

This is one of the most studied and examined works in Bulgarian literature and many books have been written on the subject. Most critics embrace the theory that Gergana is the symbol of the Bulgarian woman, her strength and willpower.
