= 1879 Bulgarian Constituent Assembly election =

- 1–30 January 1879
- 89 of the 230 seats in the Constituent Assembly and Grand National Assembly; 116 seats needed for a majority
| Party | Leader | Seats |
|---|---|---|
| Independents | Anthim I (Note: As Chairman of the Assembly. Anthim was an ex-officio representative.) | 89 |
This lists parties that won seats. See the complete results below.
| Head of government before | Head of government after |
|---|---|
| Alexander Dondukov-Korsakov; Provisional administration (Ind.) | Todor Burmov; Burmov (Cons.) |

Elections were held in Bulgaria between 1 and 30 January 1879 to elect 89 of the 230 representatives of the Constituent Assembly. It convened in Tarnovo to, as outlined in article 4 of the Treaty of Berlin, draft the constitution of the newly established Principality of Bulgaria, a vassal state of the Ottoman Empire.

== Electoral system ==
The Assembly consisted of 117 ex officio members (12 members of the clergy, 105 members of the judiciary and regional councils), 24 appointed by the leader of the provisional government, Alexander Dondukov-Korsakov, and 89 elected MPs.

== Aftermath ==
The Assembly convened on 10 February and was in session until 16 April, when it ratified the constitution. The parliament was later transferred to Sofia, which became the capital of the country. The constitution was very democratic for its time, with a strong legislature, support for which saw the first political divisions between Liberals and Conservatives.

As the constitution came into effect, the Constituent Assembly dissolved itself and its members became members of the I Grand National Assembly, tasked with electing the country's monarch. Three candidates were proposed: Pricne Reuss, Prince Valdemar of Denmark and Prince Alexander of Battenberg. As per a secret agreement between Russia and the European Great Powers, Battenberg was chosen, with a large majority. Dondukov-Korsakov then dissolved the Grand National Assembly on 18 April. According to some sources, the Assembly was in session until 26 June, when Battenberg arrived in Tarnovo to swear to defend the new constitution, but no records of sessions after 18 April have been found. The country's first government was appointed on 5 July, consisting entirely of conservatives.
