= 1st Grand National Assembly =

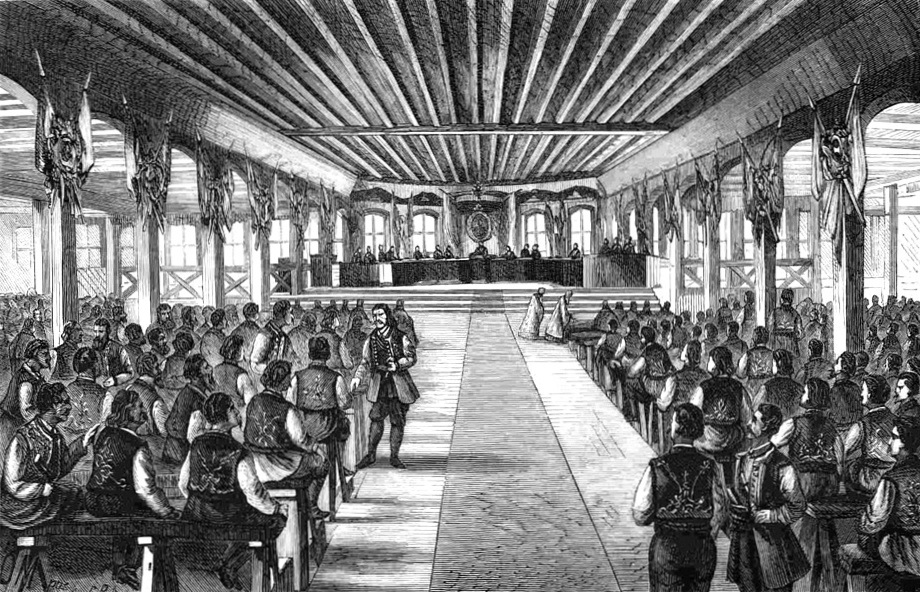
A session of the Grand National Assembly in 1879.

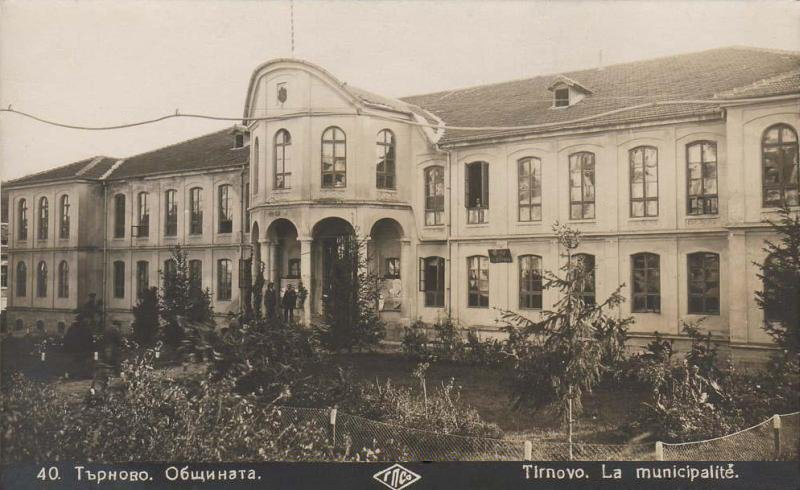
The location where the Grand National Assembly meets.

The 1st Grand National Assembly (VNS) was the former legislature of Bulgaria. The assembly was located at Tarnovo. It ran from 17 April to 26 June 1879.

This legislature is a continuation of the Constituent National Assembly. There were 229 MPs. It is also known that the assembly elected the first monarch in modern Bulgaria, Alexander of Battenberg, which later became Alexander I.

The ceremony was attended by 231 MPs, elected in January to the Constituent Assembly. The chairman of the assembly was Anthim I as chairman, Todor Ikonomov as deputy chairman, and Georgi Tishev as secretary. The power of MPs was limited.

== See also ==
- Tarnovo Constitution
- National Assembly (Bulgaria)
