= Gayda (newspaper) =

Gayda (Bulgarian: Гайда) (literally meaning gaida) was a Bulgarian language newspaper edited and published by Petko Slaveykov in the 19th century in Istanbul.

== History ==
The newspaper was established in 1863 and was stopped from printing in 1867. The first published poem by Bulgarian poet and national revolutionary Hristo Botev "Maytze si" ("To My Mother") was printed in this newspaper.
