= First Kliment Government =

Second government of the Principality of Bulgaria (1879–1880)

- 2nd Cabinet of Bulgaria

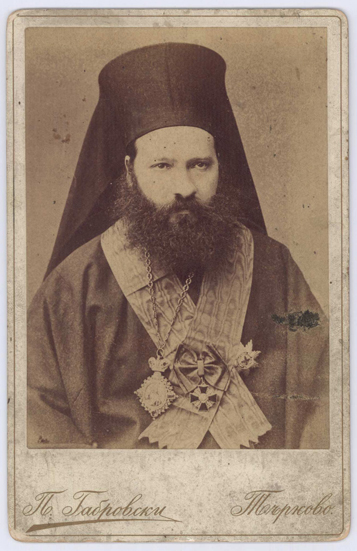
- Date formed: 24 November 1879
- Date dissolved: 26 March 1880

People and organisations
- Knyaz: Alexander of Battenberg
- Head of government: Kliment of Tarnovo
- Member party: Conservative party

History
- Election: 1879
- Legislature term: 1st National Assembly (21 October 1879 - 24 November 1879)
- Predecessor: Burmov Government
- Successor: First Dragan Tsankov Government

The Government of Bishop Kliment of Tarnovo was the second government of the Principality of Bulgaria, appointed by Alexander I of Battenberg with Decree No. 334 from 24 November 1879. It was for the most part a transitional government, made up at the time of a great political crisis, caused by the refusal of the liberals to govern together with the conservatives. On 24 November 1879 the Bulgarian Knyaz (Prince) dissolved the first National Assembly and appointed a new conservative cabinet headed by Bishop Kliment. The cabinet lasted until 26 March 1880 when it was dissolved after another win for the Liberal party at the elections for the 2nd National Assembly.

== Background ==
After the elections for the First National Assembly at the end of September 1879, the Liberal party achieved a grand victory by winning 140 out of 170 seats in the Parliament. In parliamentary debates, the Liberals accused the Conservative government of breaking the Constitution and passed a vote of no confidence in the Burmov cabinet. On the other hand, the Russian emperor insisted on forming a coalition government, in order to stabilize the political situation in the Bulgarian principality. Taking this into account Knyaz Alexander I tasked the liberal Petko Karavelov with forming a coalition cabinet. His reluctance to enter a coalition was used as a reason for the Knyaz to assign the formation of a new cabinet, consisting only of Conservative party members, despite the domination of the Liberals in the parliament.

== Politics ==
For the short period of his reign, the second cabinet made up of members of the Conservative party, managed to pass a law on the organization and activities of the Bulgarian army, by which the armed forces of the Principality were approved as a standing army with a common compulsory service for men, which was in violation of the Berlin Treaty.

In domestic politics an issue with utmost priority remained the organization of the state apparatus. Three out of five governors in the principality were replaced. At the end of 1879, the cabinet began to meet jointly with Konstantin Stoilov, head of the administration of Knyaz Alexander I, and this soon became a practice. In foreign policy, the cabinet was focused on strengthening contacts with European countries, establishing new diplomatic ties and escaping international isolation.

In January 1880, new parliamentary elections were held, which were won convincingly by the Liberal Party, securing 109 out of 172 seats in the Parliament. On 24 March 1880, pressed by the liberal majority in the Second National Assembly, Knyaz Alexander I was forced, after a long visit to St. Petersburg, to dissolve the Kliment Cabinet and appoint a Council of Ministers headed by the leader of the Liberals Dragan Tsankov.

== Cabinet ==
The cabinet, headed by Bishop Kliment of Tarnovo, is made up of members of the Conservative Party, who were favored by the Knyaz, and a Russian general at the head of the war ministry.

Office	Name	Party
Prime Minister	Kliment of Tarnovo	Conservative Party
Minister of Foreign Affairs and Religion	Grigor Nachovich	Conservative Party
Minister of the Interior	Dimitar Grekov	Conservative Party
Minister of National Education	Kliment of Tarnovo	Conservative Party
Minister of Finance	Grigor Nachovich	Conservative Party
Minister of Justice	Dimitar Grekov	Conservative Party
Minister of War	Pyotr Parensov	Russian military

=== Changes in cabinet ===
==== 29 November 1879 ====
Office	Name	Party
Minister of the Interior	Vladimir Rogge	Independent

==== 19 January 1880 ====
Office	Name	Party
Minister of the Interior	Todor Ikonomov	Conservative Party

==== 22 March 1880 ====
Office	Name	Party
Minister of War	Pavel Pleve	Russian military
