= Burmov Government =

First government of the Principality of Bulgaria (Jul–Dec 1879)

Todor Burmov Government
- 1st Cabinet of Bulgaria

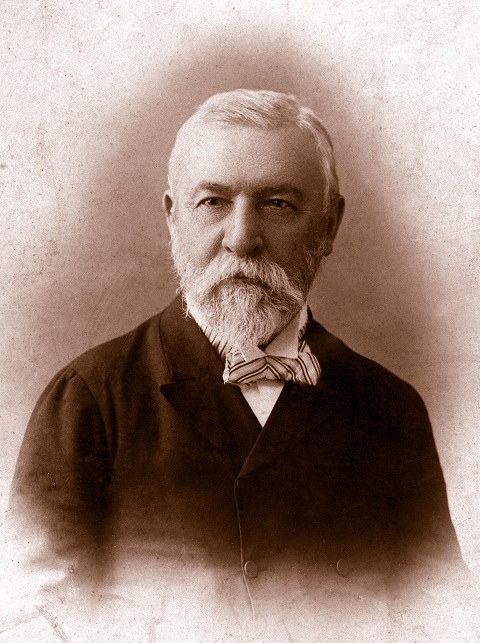
- Date formed: 5 July 1879
- Date dissolved: 24 November 1879

People and organisations
- Knyaz: Alexander of Battenberg
- Head of government: Todor Burmov
- Member party: Conservative party

History
- Election: September 1879
- Legislature term: 1st National Assembly (21 October 1879 - 24 November 1879)
- Successor: First Kliment Government

The Cabinet of Todor Burmov was the first government of the newly independent Principality of Bulgaria, appointed by Alexander I of Battenberg on 5 July 1879. Todor Burmov was a close associate of Alexander, and so was chosen to be the country's first Prime Minister despite the relatively weak position of the Conservative party. The cabinet was tasked with organizing and holding elections for the First National Assembly of Bulgaria, which took place in September 1879.

The fall of the cabinet was due to the narrow social base of the Conservative party and to some unpopular financial measures, including: raising the salt tax, dropping the exchange rate of the silver ruble and others.

== Politics ==
Burmov's cabinet completed the structuring of the central and local administration bodies inherited from the Provisional Russian Government. Contrary to the stipulations of the Berlin Treaty, it continued its efforts to create a regular army instead of armed militia. The cabinet established customs on the southern border, however all goods with areas of origin in Eastern Rumelia or Macedonia were exempted from custom duties. The Foreign ministry saw the establishment of diplomatic relations with neighbouring countries and the Great powers.

The government of Burmov was under strong Russian influence. It was put together by Alexander I on the orders of the Russian diplomatic representative in Sofia. After the elections for National Assembly in October, all decisions on the matter of domestic politics were dictated by the opinion of Tsar Alexander II. However the Cabinet did not succumb to the lobbying of Russian bankers and military circles to turn the Bulgarian National Bank into a joint stock company and to run a railway line from Sofia to the Danube instead of running it from Sofia to Vienna.

Justice Minister Dimitar Grekov set up joint commissions to resolve property disputes between returning Turkish expatriates and Bulgarians who occupied the vacated lands, but the issue has not been resolved during the short term of the cabinet. Domestically, the government was forced to contend with the Turkish bands that lingered long after the end of the Russo-Turkish war in the regions of Eski Cuma and Osman Pazar. The Cabinet's main political opponent was the Liberal Party, which won the National election in September 1879 and overthrew Burmov and his ministers after successful vote of no confidence in November 1879.

== Cabinet ==
The cabinet was made up of members of the Conservative Party, which reflected the interests of a small stratum of the merchant-bourgeoisie, and a Russian general at the head of the War Ministry. The Conservative party's leadership core includes political figures with a European upbringing and culture.

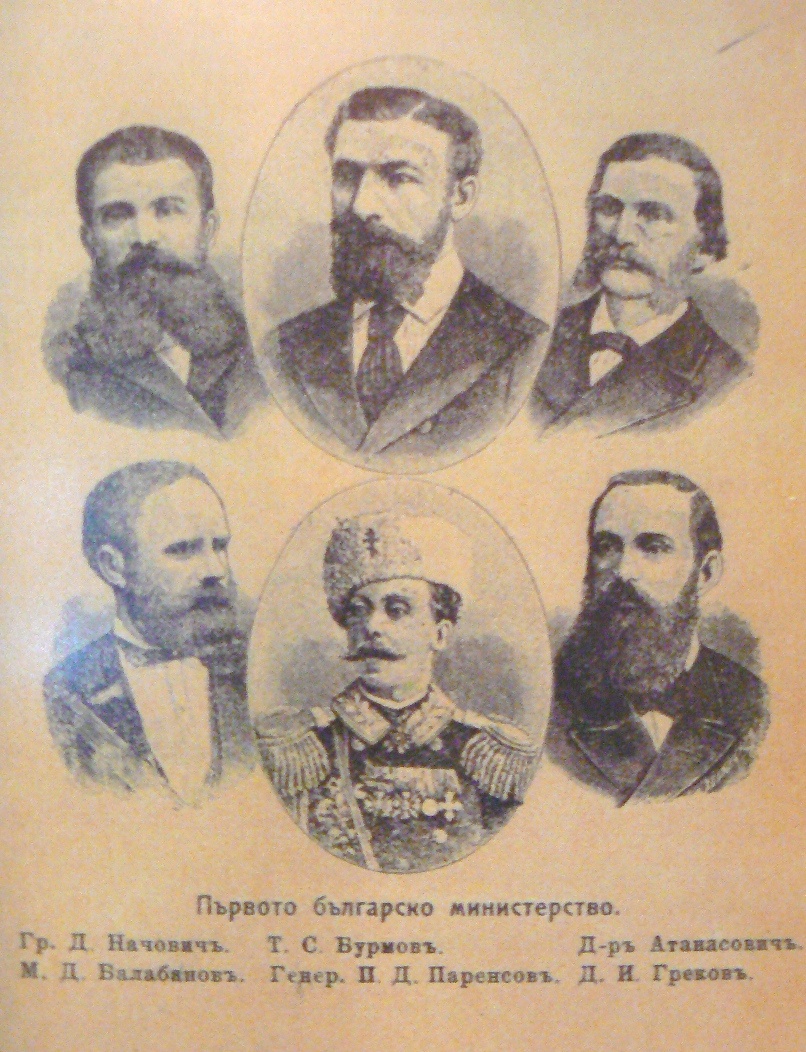
Members of the First Bulgarian Cabinet

The Council of Ministers is formed by 4 ministers and one Prime Minister

Office	Name	Party
Prime Minister	Todor Burmov	Conservative Party
Minister of Foreign affairs and Religious denominations	Marko Balabanov	Conservative Party
Minister of Justice	Dimitar Grekov	Conservative Party
Minister of the Interior	Todor Burmov	Conservative Party
Minister of National Education	Todor Burmov	Conservative Party
Minister of Finance	Grigor Nachovich	Conservative Party
Minister of War	Pyotr Parensov	Russian military

=== 26th of July 1879 ===
Office	Name	Party
Minister of National Education	Georgi Atanasovich	Conservative Party

== Events ==
- 10 July 1879 – The government imposes martial law in Varna and parts of the neighbouring provinces to deal with Turkish unrest.
- 19 July 1879 – The first Bulgarian diplomatic agents are appointed. They are accredited in Serbia, Romania and the Ottoman Empire.
- August 1879 – The Telegraph-Postal and Road-Building Departments of the Ministry of the Interior are established.
- 14 August 1879 – the political office of Knyaz Alexander Battenberg was established, Konstantin Stoilov was appointed political secretary.
- September 1879 – national elections for the 1st National Assembly, won by the Liberal party.
- 24 November 1879 – The Bulgarian Knyaz dissolves the National Assembly and appoints a new conservative cabinet headed by Bishop Kliment of Tarnovo.
