= Gayda (surname) =

Gayda is a surname. Notable people with the surname include:

- Ed Gayda (born 1927), American basketball player
- Galina Gayda (born 1936), Russian sprinter
- Jackie Gayda (born 1981), American wrestler
- Toni Rose Gayda (born 1958), Filipina television personality
- Virginio Gayda (1885–1944), Italian journalist
