= Johan Ehrnrooth =

Finnish statesman in the service of Imperial Russia

Johan Casimir Ehrnrooth
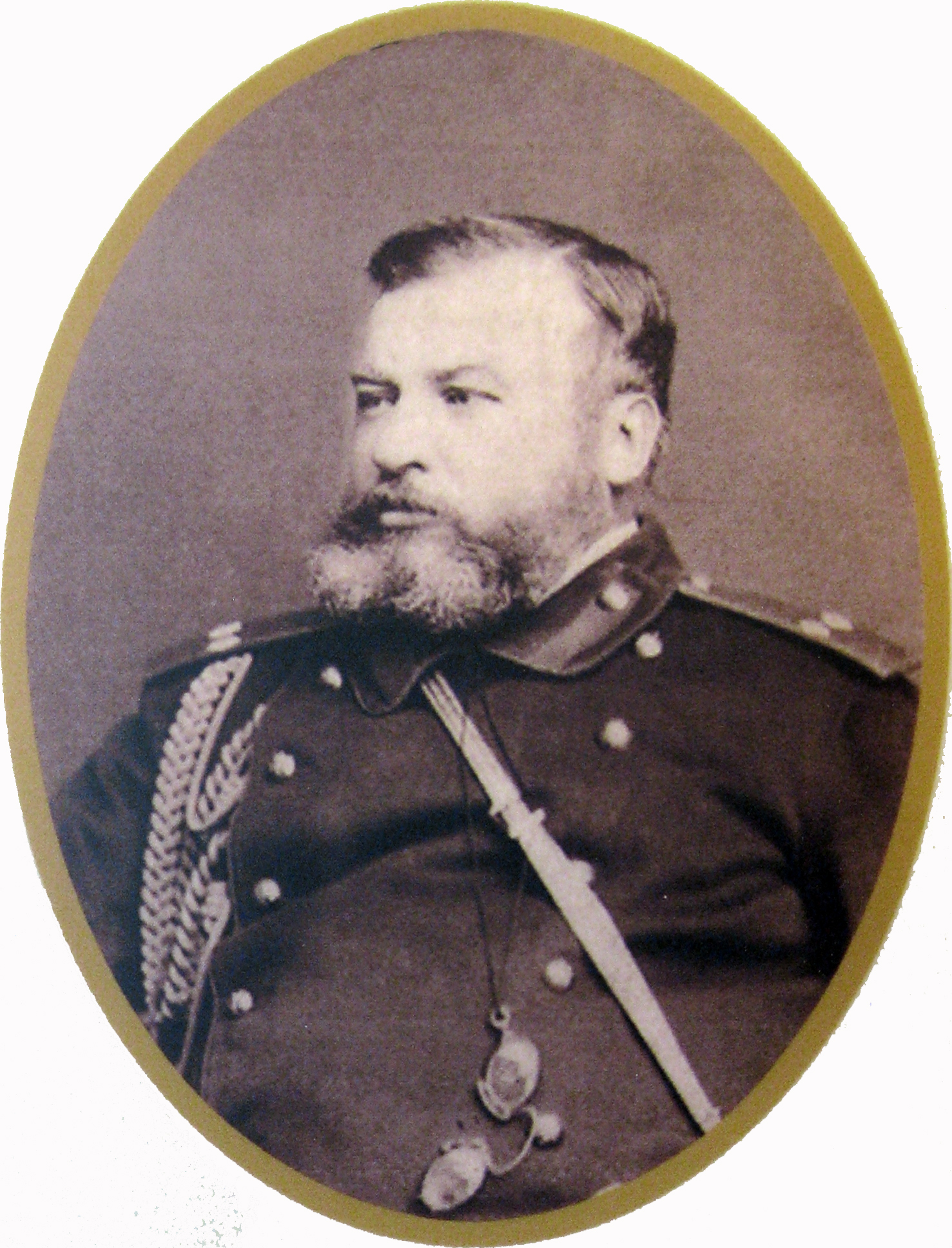
- Lieutenant-General Ehrnrooth during his time in Bulgaria.

5th Prime Minister of Bulgaria
- In office 9 May 1881 – 13 July 1881
- Monarch: Alexander
- Preceded by: Petko Karavelov
- Succeeded by: Vacant (Alexander's Authoritarian Regime)

Minister of War of Bulgaria
- In office 17 April 1880 – 13 July 1881
- Preceded by: Alexander Timler
- Succeeded by: Vladimir Krylov

Minister of the Interior of Bulgaria
- In office 9 May 1881 – 13 July 1881
- Premier: Himself
- Preceded by: Petko Slaveykov
- Succeeded by: Arnold Remlingen (under Alexander's Authoritarian Regime)

Personal details
- Born: 26 November [O.S. 14 November] 1833 Seesta Mansion, Nastola, Grand Duchy of Finland, Russian Empire
- Died: 5 February [O.S. 23 January] 1913 (aged 79) Helsingfors (now Helsinki, Finland), Grand Duchy of Finland, Russian Empire

Military service
- Allegiance: Russian Empire; Principality of Bulgaria
- Branch/service: Imperial Russian Army; Bulgarian Land Forces
- Rank: Lieutenant-General
- Commands: Vitebsk Infantry Regiment; 11th Infantry Division; Ministry of War of Bulgaria
- Battles/wars: Caucasian War; January Uprising; Russo-Turkish War

Johan Casimir Ehrnrooth (Russian: Казимир Густавович Э́рнрот, Kazimir Gustavovich Ernrot; 26 November 1833 – 5 February 1913) was a Finnish statesman in the service of Imperial Russia, who also acted as Prime Minister of Bulgaria.

== Biography ==
Ehrnrooth was born to an affluent noble family in the Seesta Mansion in Nastola in the Grand Duchy of Finland. In 1856, he graduated from the Imperial Military Academy in Saint Petersburg and enlisted in the Imperial Russian Army.

Ehrnrooth first came to prominence when he played a leading role in suppressing the resistance of Imam Shamil and the Caucasian Avars in 1859. At the time a Major in the Russian Army, Ehrnrooth continued to rise through the ranks in campaigns against Polish rebels and fighting to remove the Ottoman Turks from Bulgaria. Following the Independence of Bulgaria Ehrnrooth was chosen by Russia to look after the interests of Alexander of Bulgaria, becoming Minister of War on 17 April 1880. Ehrnrooth became the strongman of the government, and became Prime Minister on 9 May 1881 whilst Alexander finalised his plans to assume full control of the country. Ehrnrooth became the strongest supporter of Alexander during this period, although he was forced to leave Bulgaria when the experiment floundered.

After his return to Russia Ehrnrooth became Minister-Secretary of State for Finnish Affairs, although the job, which involved drives towards Russification, did not suit the Finn. He retired in the 1890s and died of a stroke in Helsinki at the age of 79. Although he had no children both Finnish World War II colonel and later general Adolf Ehrnrooth and former chairman of Nokia and Kymmene Corporation Casimir Ehrnrooth are from his family line.

Political offices
Preceded by Alexander Timler	Minister of War of Bulgaria; 17 April 1880 – 13 July 1881	Succeeded by Vladimir Krylov
