= People's Party (Eastern Rumelia) =

The People's Party, also known as Unionist Party or the False-Unionist Party (Bulgarian: Народна партия, romanized: Narodna partiya, Bulgarian: Съединистка партия, romanized: Saedinistka partiya, Bulgarian: Лъжесъединистка партия, romanized: Lazhesaedinistka partiya), was a political party active in the autonomous region of Eastern Rumelia between 1881 and 1885 and in the Principality of Bulgaria after 1885. Alongside the Liberal Party, it was one of the two major political parties in the province.

Its leaders included the politicians Hristo Stambolski, Mihail Madzharov, prominent members of the Geshovi business family (Ivan Evstratiev Geshov, Ivan Stefanov Geshov and Ivan Dimitriev Geshov), the revolutionaries Mihail Grekov and Georgi Markovich and the writers Ivan Vazov and Konstantin Velichkov. It was associated with the newspapers Maritsa, Narodniy Glas and Suedinenie.

The party strongly supported incorporating Eastern Rumelia into Bulgaria, running on a platform of unification in the 1884 election, however after winning and forming a government, the party became increasingly non-committal on the issue and was referred to as False-Unionist. It was the ruling party in the autonomous region between 1884 and 1885 and was supported by the country's second head of state, Gavril Krastevich. Following the Bulgarian unification the party remained active, but was eventually dissolved during Stefan Stambolov's time in office. After the fall of Stambolov in 1894, the party was restored and it merged with Stoilov's conservatives into the People's Party.
