= National Assembly (Bulgaria) =

Unicameral legislature of Bulgaria

Coordinates: 42°41′51″N 23°19′30″E

National Assembly Народно събрание Narodno sŭbranie
- 52nd National Assembly
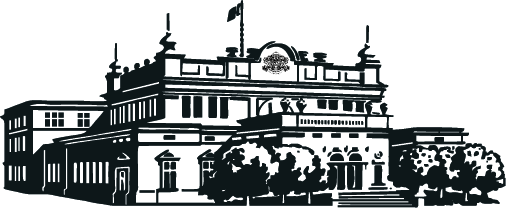

Type
- Type: Unicameral

Leadership
- Speaker: Mihaela Dotsova, PB since 30 April 2026
- Deputy Speakers: Ivan Angelov, PB; Atanas Atanasov, DB; Tsoncho Ganev, Revival; Raya Nazaryan, GERB; Ayten Sabri, DPS; Stoyo Stoev, PP

Structure
- Political groups: Government (131): PB (131); Opposition (109): GERB–SDS (39); DB (21); DPS (21); PP (16); Revival (12)

Elections
- Voting system: Proportional representation
- First election: 1–30 January 1879 / 30 September – 7 October 1879 18 November 1945 / 18 December 1949 10 June 1990 / 13 October 1991
- Last election: 19 April 2026
- Next election: By 2030

Meeting place
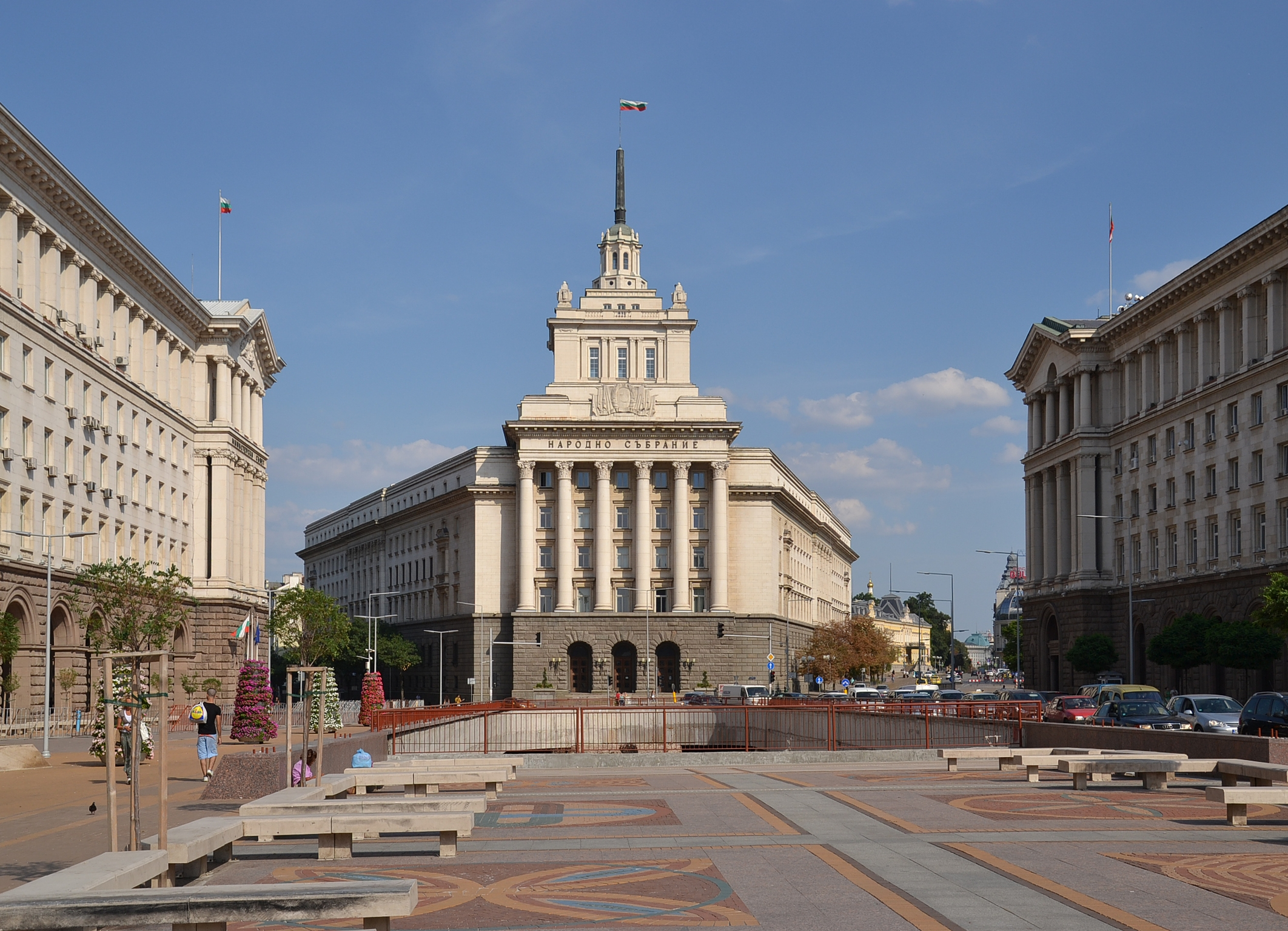
- Party House, Sofia

Website
- parliament.bg/en

The National Assembly (Bulgarian: Народно събрание, romanized: Narodno sŭbranie) is the unicameral parliament and legislative body of Bulgaria.

== History ==
The Bulgarian National Assembly was established in 1879 with the Tarnovo Constitution. From 1881 to 1883, under the Regime of Full Powers of Prince Alexander I, it was replaced by an appointed State Council of Bulgaria. The unicameral legislature provided by the Tarnovo Constitution, while favored by the historical liberals, drew the ire of the conservatives who proposed to replace it with a bicameral parliament.

During the communist period between 1946 and 1989, the National Assembly was characterized as a rubber stamp for the Bulgarian Communist Party (BKP) or as only being able to affect issues of low sensitivity and salience to the Bulgarian communist regime. The BKP controlled nomination and election processes at every level in its political system, allowing it to stamp out any opposition. As a legacy of the communist-era system of government, where the National Assembly was constitutionally defined as the supreme organ of state power and only branch of government, government ministers are formally appointed and dismissed by the Assembly on prime ministerial advice (rather than the President on prime ministerial advice, as in other parliamentary systems) even after the transition to democracy.

== Elections ==
Three types of candidates participate in the elections: parties, coalitions and independent candidates. Every citizen who has the right to vote can do so for one candidate. The ratio of the number of valid votes for the candidate relative to the total number of valid votes gives the candidate the support of voters. The Central Election Commission is the institution responsible for all elections in the country.

The National Assembly is composed of parliamentary groups and independent members, with parliamentary groups representing a political party, and they, in turn, represent their voters.

Since constitutional changes enacted in 2023, the constitution now states that a dissolved parliament continues to function until the new tenure of the National Assembly is constituted (previously, once a parliament was dissolved the deputies automatically lost their mandates, and the National Assembly could not convene).

== Ordinary National Assembly ==
By the Constitution (Art. 62 to 91), The National Assembly consists of 240 members elected for a four-year term, elected by proportional representation in multi-seat constituencies. Political parties must garner a minimum of 4% of the national vote in order to enter the Assembly. Bulgaria has a multi-party system. In order to be eligible as an MP, one must be a Bulgarian citizen over the age of 21 years who is neither interdicted nor is serving a custodial sentence. Bulgarian citizens with dual nationality must be resident in Bulgaria during the last eighteen months before their election; this residency requirement does not apply to Bulgarian citizens without dual nationality.

The National Assembly is responsible for enactment of laws, approval of the state budget, scheduling of presidential elections, selection and dismissal of the Prime Minister and other ministers, declaration of war, concluding peace and deployment of troops outside Bulgaria, declares a state of war or other state of emergency on the proposal of the President or the Cabinet, grants amnesty, and ratification of international treaties and agreements. It is headed and presided by the Chairperson of the National Assembly of Bulgaria.

The Assembly administers the publication of the State Gazette, Bulgaria's gazette of record.

=== Procedure ===
The National Assembly is inaugurated by the eldest attending elected member of Parliament. On the first day of sitting, they preside over the election of the Speaker (Chairperson) and Deputy speakers, form the parliamentary groups, and appoint the secretaries of the Assembly.

Once elected, the Speakers retain their party allegiances, which means that they remain as MPs and are allowed to take part in debates and voting.

More than 121 MPs must be present in order for any session to commence, and 50%+1 of those present must vote "for" any point of order or bill to be approved, unless the specific matter of the vote requires another majority.

Parliament sits Wednesday to Friday, and sessions begin at 9 am. Parliamentary committees sit in the afternoons.

=== Electing a government ===
In order to elect a government, the National Assembly must have formed the parliamentary groups and have secured a majority. The President of the Republic calls to consultations for electing a government the parliamentary groups. Per article 99 of the Constitution, the President gives out the first mandate to the candidate for a Prime Minister of the largest parliamentary group in order to elect a government. If after 7 days, the candidate fails to propose a government, the second mandate goes to the PM candidate of the second largest parliamentary group. If the second mandate fails as well, the President gives out the third and last mandate to the candidate of one of the other parliamentary groups. If the mandate is delivered, the President signs it and proposes to the National Assembly to elect that government. In order for the government to be elected, there need to be present more than 121 votes "for".

Ministers may be chosen from among the MPs, or they may be experts outside Parliament. All MPs picked to be Cabinet ministers lose their MP status, and the next candidate from the party list of the constituency takes his place.

=== Layout ===
==== Old Parliament House ====
In 2020 and 2021, the old Parliament House was only used for special occasions, such as the opening and closing of the legislative session or the inauguration of a new president. Following the April 2021 parliamentary elections, the legislature returned to the old parliament building.

The Chamber is made up of 286 seats, all facing the 5-seat speaker's bench in a 26 x 11 arrangement. In front of the Speaker, also facing the chamber, is the pulpit, in front of which is the stenographers' desk.

Parties sit in parliamentary groups, loosely following the rule that the political left sits to the Speaker's left and the political right to his right. Generally, the largest parties choose the chamber's left, right or centre wings, with smaller blocks accommodating themselves wherever convenient. Individual MPs will sometimes sit entirely outside their block or stand, and, since compulsory electronic registration was implemented, may even vote from any seat in the house.

To the speaker's right, also facing the chamber, is a section with 17 seats reserved for the Cabinet, any of whom may or may not be present at any time during a parliamentary session. Any of them may, however, be called up by Parliament at any time if needed.

==== Largo Parliament House ====
Located in the former Bulgarian Communist Party headquarters building in the Largo, The Chamber is made up of 270 seats arranged in a hemicycle of twelve rows, all facing the 7-seat speaker's bench. In front of the Speaker, also facing the chamber, is the pulpit containing a stenographer's desk at the center and two sections reserved for the Cabinet, each with 13 seats, at the sides.

The new plenary hall, which is located under a glass roof, is larger than the old one and can be easily remodeled to fit the 400-member Grand National Assembly. It was used briefly in 2020 and 2021 during the end of GERB's third government. Following the April 2021 parliamentary elections, the legislature returned to the old parliament building.

However, in 2023, following a decision of the 49th National Assembly, parliamentary sessions were once again moved to the former Party House building in the Largo, where the legislature has continued to meet since.

== Grand National Assembly ==
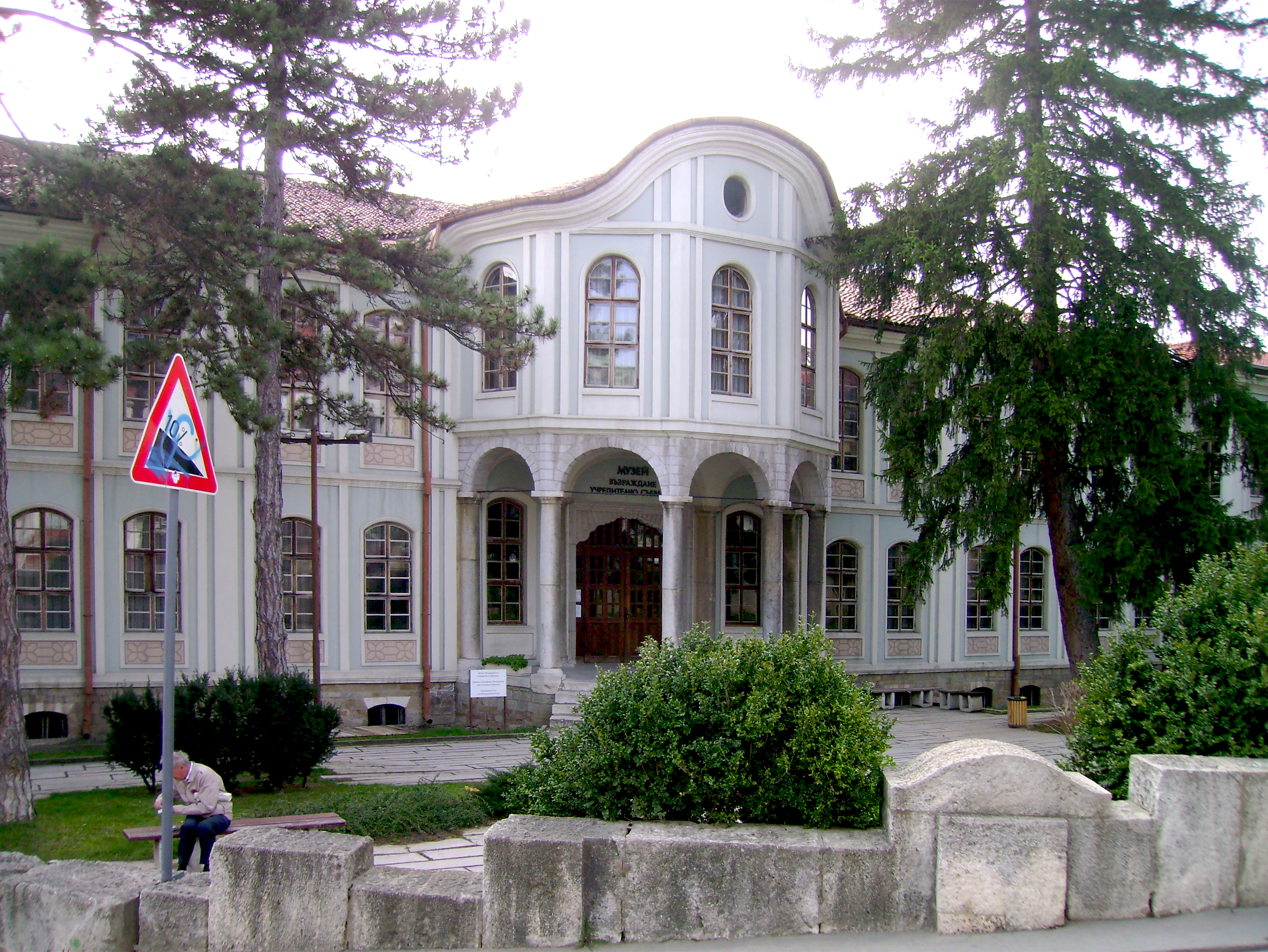
The building of the first National Assembly of Bulgaria in Veliko Tarnovo

In addition to the ordinary National Assembly, a Grand National Assembly (Велико народно събрание, Veliko narodno sabranie) may be convened for matters of special jurisdiction, such as: 1) Adoption of a new Constitution; 2) Amendment of certain articles of the Constitution, e.g. those related with the basic civil rights; 3) Changes in the territory (gain or loss) of the Republic, etc. Before the World War II the Grand National Assembly was also competent in electing the Regency of the Bulgarian Kingdom if the tzar had not come to age. The First and the Third Grand National Assemblies also elected the first two Bulgarian monarchs after the liberation from Ottoman rule – Prince (Knjaz) Alexander Battenberg and Prince (Knjaz) Ferdinand Saxe Coburg-Gotha.

As an organ, the Grand National Assembly was introduced with the Tarnovo Constitution of 1879, abolished in 1947 and reintroduced with the 1991 constitution. In different constitutional provisions, it was constituted by a different number of representatives. According to the 1991 Constitution, it consists of 400 deputies (as opposed to 240 in the ordinary one). The 1991 Constitution was adopted by the Seventh Grand National Assembly and was composed of 200 members being elected by proportional representation and the other 200 under a first-past-the-post voting system. The Constitution provides that the elections for Grand National Assembly shall be conducted in the same manner as those for the Ordinary National Assembly.

A qualified majority of 2/3 during three voting procedures on separate dates is required for a decision to be made. The Grand National Assembly can also serve as an ordinary National Assembly, taking care of regular legislative activities in urgent cases only. After it has concluded its work on the matter for which it was elected, the Grand National Assembly is dissolved ex lege and the President of the Republic shall appoint elections for an ordinary National Assembly.

A total of seven Grand National Assemblies have been in operation in Bulgaria, the last one from 10 July 1990 to 12 July 1991 adopting the current constitution.

== Building ==
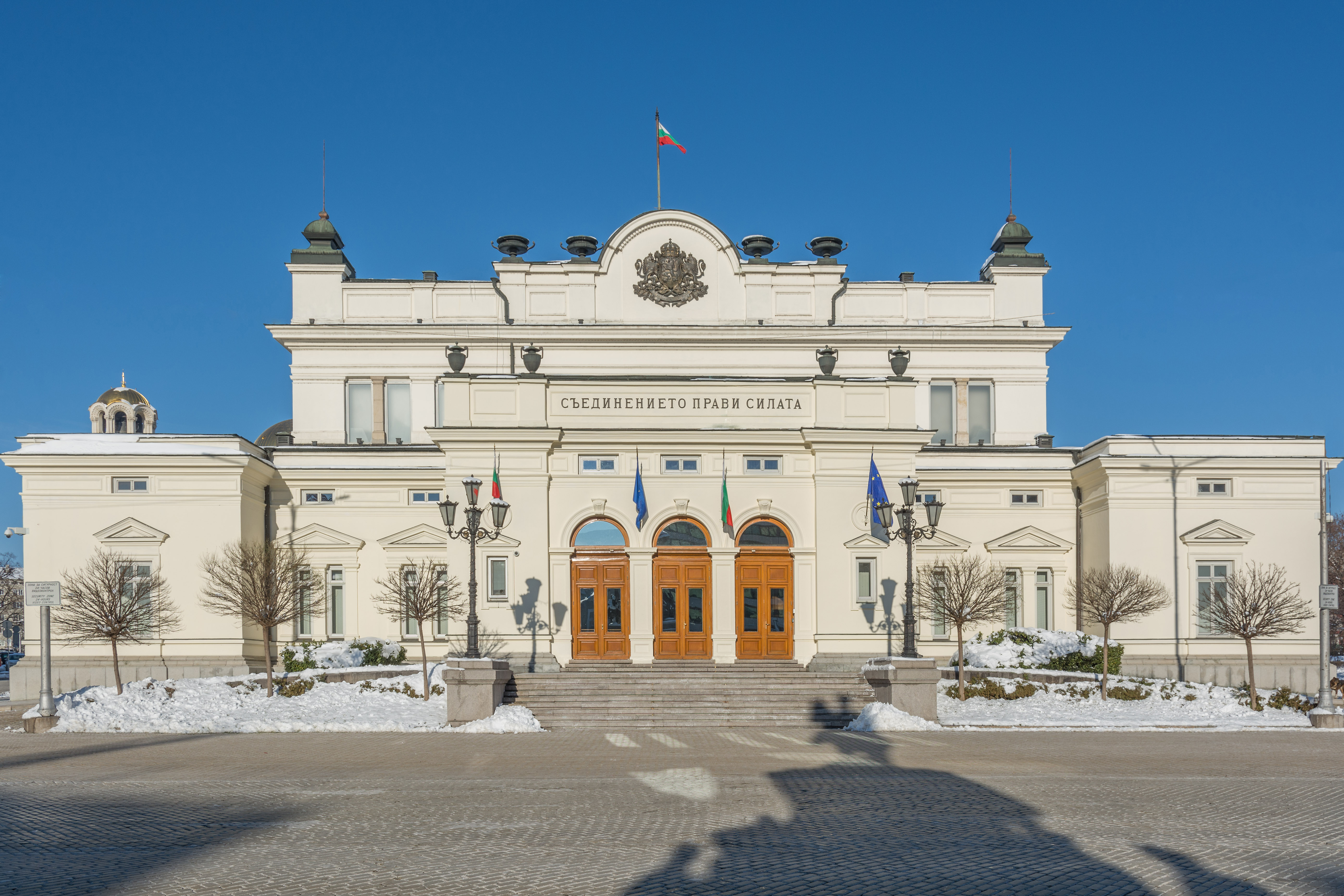
View from Tsar Osvoboditel

The National Assembly's main building has been proclaimed a monument of culture for its historic significance. Situated in downtown Sofia, it was designed in the Neo-Renaissance style by Konstantin Jovanović.

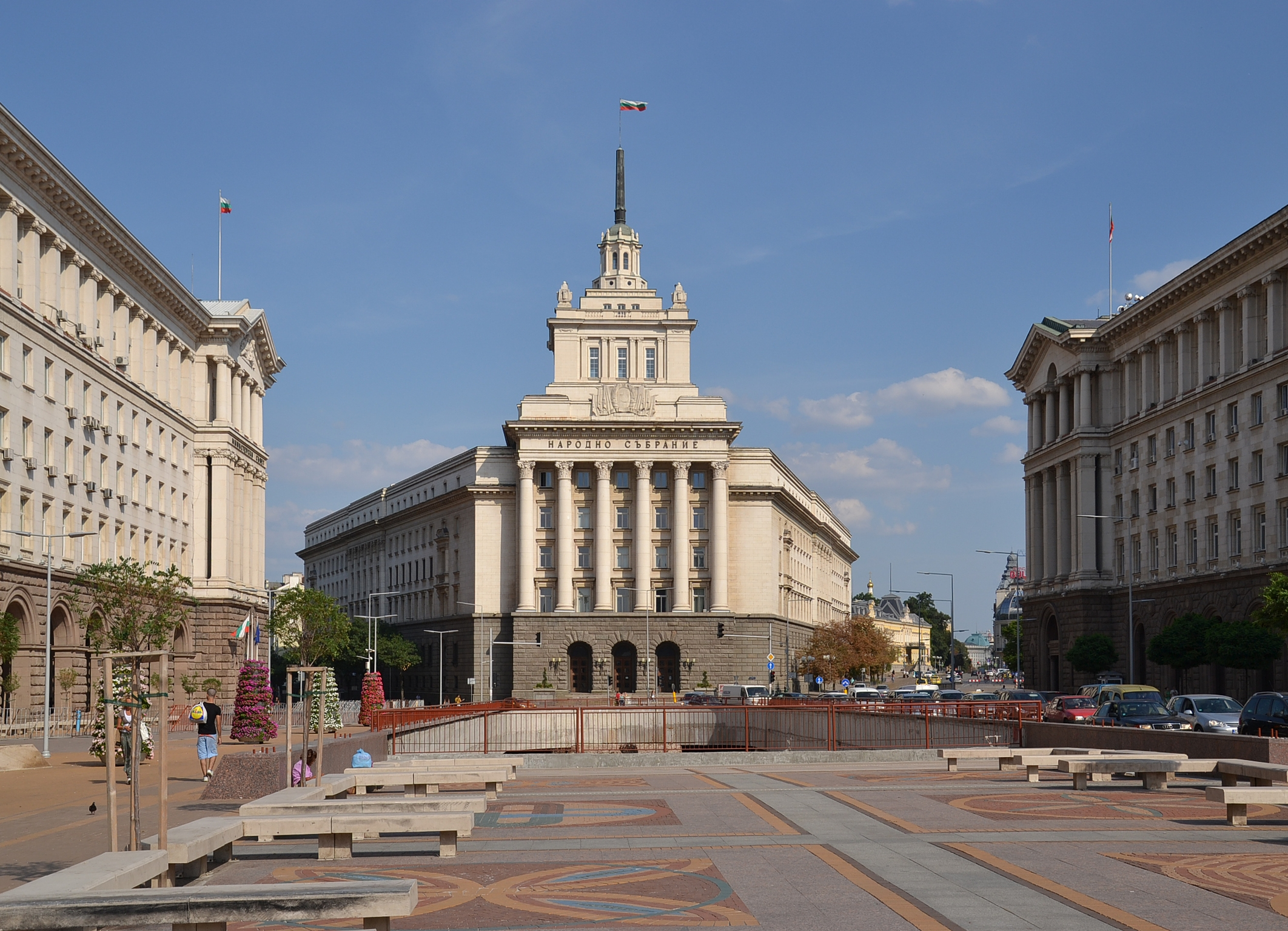
Office house of the National Assembly (former House of the BCP) used as National Assembly building from 2020 to 2021 and from 2023

Due to insufficient space in the main building at Parliament Square, the National Assembly is now housed by the former headquarters of the Bulgarian Communist Party, located at the Largo - the so-called Party House. Initially, only administrative offices have been relocated, but proposals to convert it into an interior space for the plenary chamber have been made since 1996, with the relocation taking place in 2020. After the April 2021 Bulgarian parliamentary election, the National Assembly moved again to the old Parliament House because ITN, Democratic Bulgaria, ISMV, and DPS viewed the Party House building as a symbol of Bulgaria's communist past. In 2023, the 49th National Assembly decided to relocate its plenary sessions back to the former Party House building, where it continues to convene.

== List of National Assemblies ==
Parliament	Term	Term length (days)	Seats
Constituent National Assembly	10 February 1879 – 16 April 1879	66	231
1st Grand National Assembly	17 April 1879 – 26 June 1879	71	231
1st Ordinary National Assembly of Bulgaria	21 October 1879 – 24 November 1879	35	158
2nd Ordinary National Assembly of Bulgaria	23 March 1880 – 18 December 1880	271	172
2nd Grand National Assembly of Bulgaria	7 January 1881		307
3rd Ordinary National Assembly of Bulgaria	10 December 1882 – 25 December 1883	381	47
4th Ordinary National Assembly of Bulgaria	27 June 1884 – 6 September 1886	802	195/286
3rd Grand National Assembly of Bulgaria	19 October 1886 – 3 August 1887	289	493
5th Ordinary National Assembly of Bulgaria	15 October 1887 – 17 December 1889	795	285
6th Ordinary National Assembly of Bulgaria	15 October 1890 – 15 December 1892	793	276
4th Grand National Assembly of Bulgaria	3 May 1893 – 17 May 1893	15	577
7th Ordinary National Assembly of Bulgaria	15 October 1893 – 21 December 1893	68	145
8th Ordinary National Assembly of Bulgaria	15 October 1894 – 4 February 1896	478	149
9th Ordinary National Assembly of Bulgaria	1 December 1896 – 19 December 1898	749	159
10th Ordinary National Assembly of Bulgaria	16 May 1899 – 29 November 1900	563	169
11th Ordinary National Assembly of Bulgaria	22 February 1901 – 23 December 1901	305	166
12th Ordinary National Assembly of Bulgaria	22 April 1902 – 31 March 1903	344	188
13th Ordinary National Assembly of Bulgaria	2 November 1903 – 22 December 1907	1512	189
14th Ordinary National Assembly of Bulgaria	15 June 1908 – 15 February 1911	976	203
5th Grand National Assembly of Bulgaria	9 June 1911 – 9 July 1911	31	414
15th Ordinary National Assembly of Bulgaria	15 October 1911 – 23 July 1913	648	213
16th Ordinary National Assembly of Bulgaria	19 December 1913 – 31 December 1913	13	204
17th Ordinary National Assembly of Bulgaria	20 March 1914 – 15 April 1919	1853	257
18th Ordinary National Assembly of Bulgaria	2 October 1919 – 20 February 1920	142	237
19th Ordinary National Assembly of Bulgaria	15 April 1920 – 11 March 1923	1061	232
20th Ordinary National Assembly of Bulgaria	21 May 1923 – 11 June 1923	22	245
21st Ordinary National Assembly of Bulgaria	9 December 1923 – 15 April 1927	1224	267
22nd Ordinary National Assembly of Bulgaria	19 June 1927 – 18 April 1931	1400	275
23rd Ordinary National Assembly of Bulgaria	20 August 1931 – 19 May 1934	1004	283
24th Ordinary National Assembly of Bulgaria	22 May 1938 – 27 April 1939	341	160
25th Ordinary National Assembly of Bulgaria	24 February 1940 – 23 August 1944	1643	160
26th Ordinary National Assembly of Bulgaria	15 December 1945 – 28 September 1946	288	276
6th Grand National Assembly of Bulgaria	7 November 1946 – 21 October 1949	1080	465(375)
1st National Assembly of Bulgaria	17 January 1950 – 2 November 1953	1386	239
2nd National Assembly of Bulgaria	14 January 1954 – 11 December 1957	1428	249
3rd National Assembly of Bulgaria	13 January 1958 – 4 November 1961	1392	254
4th National Assembly of Bulgaria	15 March 1962 – 8 December 1965	1365	321
5th National Assembly of Bulgaria	11 March 1966 – 18 May 1971	1895	416
6th National Assembly of Bulgaria	7 July 1971 – 9 March 1976	1708	400
7th National Assembly of Bulgaria	15 June 1976 – 7 April 1981	1758	400
8th National Assembly	16 June 1981 – 21 March 1986	1740	400
9th National Assembly	17 June 1986 – 3 April 1990	1387	400
7th Grand National Assembly of Bulgaria	10 July 1990 – 2 October 1991	450	400
36th National Assembly	4 November 1991 – 17 October 1994	1079	240
37th National Assembly	12 January 1995 – 13 February 1997	764	240
38th National Assembly	7 May 1997 – 19 April 2001	1444	240
39th National Assembly	5 July 2001 – 17 June 2005	1444	240
40th National Assembly	11 July 2005 – 25 June 2009	1446	240
41st National Assembly	14 July 2009 – 13 March 2013	1339	240
42nd National Assembly	21 May 2013 – 6 August 2014	443	240
43rd National Assembly	27 October 2014 – 27 January 2017	824	240
44th National Assembly	19 April 2017 – 26 March 2021	1438	240
45th National Assembly	15 April 2021 – 12 May 2021	28	240
46th National Assembly	21 July 2021 – 16 September 2021	58	240
47th National Assembly	3 December 2021 – 2 August 2022	243	240
48th National Assembly	19 October 2022 – 3 February 2023	108	240
49th National Assembly	12 April 2023 – 19 June 2024	435	240
50th National Assembly	19 June 2024 – 10 November 2024	145	240
51st National Assembly	11 November 2024 – 29 April 2026	535	240
52nd National Assembly	30 April 2026 –		240

== Historical composition of the National Assembly ==
=== 1990–2005 ===
BSP / DPS / NDSV / BZNS / SDS / DSB / BBB / Ataka / Others		Total seats
1990	211 / 23 / 16 / 144 / 6	400
1991	106 / 24 / 110	240
1994	125 / 15 / 18 / 69 / 13	240
1997	58 / 19 / 137 / 12 / 14	240
2001	48 / 21 / 120 / 51	240
2005	82 / 34 / 53 / 20 / 17 / 21 / 13	240

=== 2009–2017 ===
BSP / DPS / Blue Coalition / GERB / PF / Ataka / Others		Total seats
2009	40 / 38 / 15 / 116 / 21 / 10	240
2013	84 / 36 / 97 / 23	240
2014	39 / 38 / 23 / 84 / 19 / 11 / 26	240
2017	80 / 26 / 95 / 27 / 12	240

=== 2021–2024 ===
IBG / BSP / DPS / APS / PP / PP–DB / DB / GERB–SDS / ITN / Revival / Others		Total seats
April 2021	14 / 43 / 30 / 27 / 75 / 51	240
July 2021	13 / 36 / 29 / 34 / 63 / 65	240
November 2021	26 / 34 / 67 / 16 / 59 / 25 / 13	240
2022	25 / 36 / 53 / 20 / 67 / 27 / 12	240
2023	23 / 36 / 64 / 69 / 11 / 37	240
June 2024	19 / 47 / 39 / 68 / 16 / 38 / 13	240
October 2024	19 / 29 / 19 / 36 / 66 / 17 / 33 / 21	240

=== Since 2026 ===
PB / DPS / PP–DB / GERB–SDS / Revival		Total seats
2026	131 / 21 / 37 / 39 / 12	240

== See also ==
- Chairperson of the National Assembly of Bulgaria
- Politics of Bulgaria
- List of legislatures by country
