= Liberal Party (Bulgaria) =

Liberal Party Либерална партия
- Leader: Dragan Tsankov; Petko Karavelov; Petko Slaveykov
- Founded: 1879
- Dissolved: 1896
- Succeeded by: Democratic Party
- Headquarters: Sofia, Bulgaria
- Ideology: Liberalism
- Political position: Center-left

The Liberal Party (Bulgarian: Либерална партия, Liberalna partiya, LP) was a political party in Bulgaria and the main force in domestic politics between independence in 1878 and the mid-1880s when it dissolved into several different factions.

== History ==
The party was established ahead of the 1879 parliamentary election by the liberal movement that had formed in the Constituent Assembly that had drafted the Tarnovo Constitution, led by Petko Karavelov, Petko Slaveykov and Dragan Tsankov. The party won 140 of the 170 seats in the National Assembly, but was not tasked with forming a government by Prince Alexander. However, the party defeated the Conservative Party government in a motion of no confidence and won the snap elections held the following year with 103 of the 162 seats, after which it formed two governments, before the 1881 coup by Prince Alexander. When the constitution was restored in 1883, the moderate faction led by Tsankov was open to cooperation with the Conservative Party, with which it formed a government. After the hardline faction led by Karavelov and Slaveykov won the 1884 elections with 100 of the 171 seats. and formed a government, the moderates formed the Tsankovist Party. Due to the hardline liberals' government's pro-Russian politics, even after Russia's opposition to the unification with Eastern Rumelia, a group led by Chairman of Parliament Stefan Stambolov formed the Stambolovist Liberals in 1886. Following the 1886 coup, Liberal Party minister Vasil Radoslavov also joined the Stambolovists. Karavelov resigned as Prime Minister shortly after the following counter-coup and became one of Bulgaria's regents, but he was sidelined and later imprisoned during Stambolov's government and the party was banned. After Stambolov's fall from power, the remaining hardline liberals won three seats in the 1894 elections, and most of the party was reorganised into the Democratic Party in 1896.

== Political positions ==
The party's base of support was mostly the urban and rural members of Bulgaria's lower and middle class. The party's founders supported and drafted the Tarnovo Constitution, one of the most democratic constitutions at the time. As a result, it had a tense relationship with Prince Alexander and during his authoritarian regime Karavelov and Slaveykov were persecuted and fled to Eastern Rumelia. The party's foreign policy was generally pro-Russian.
