= Petko Slaveykov =

Bulgarian poet and journalist (1827–1895)

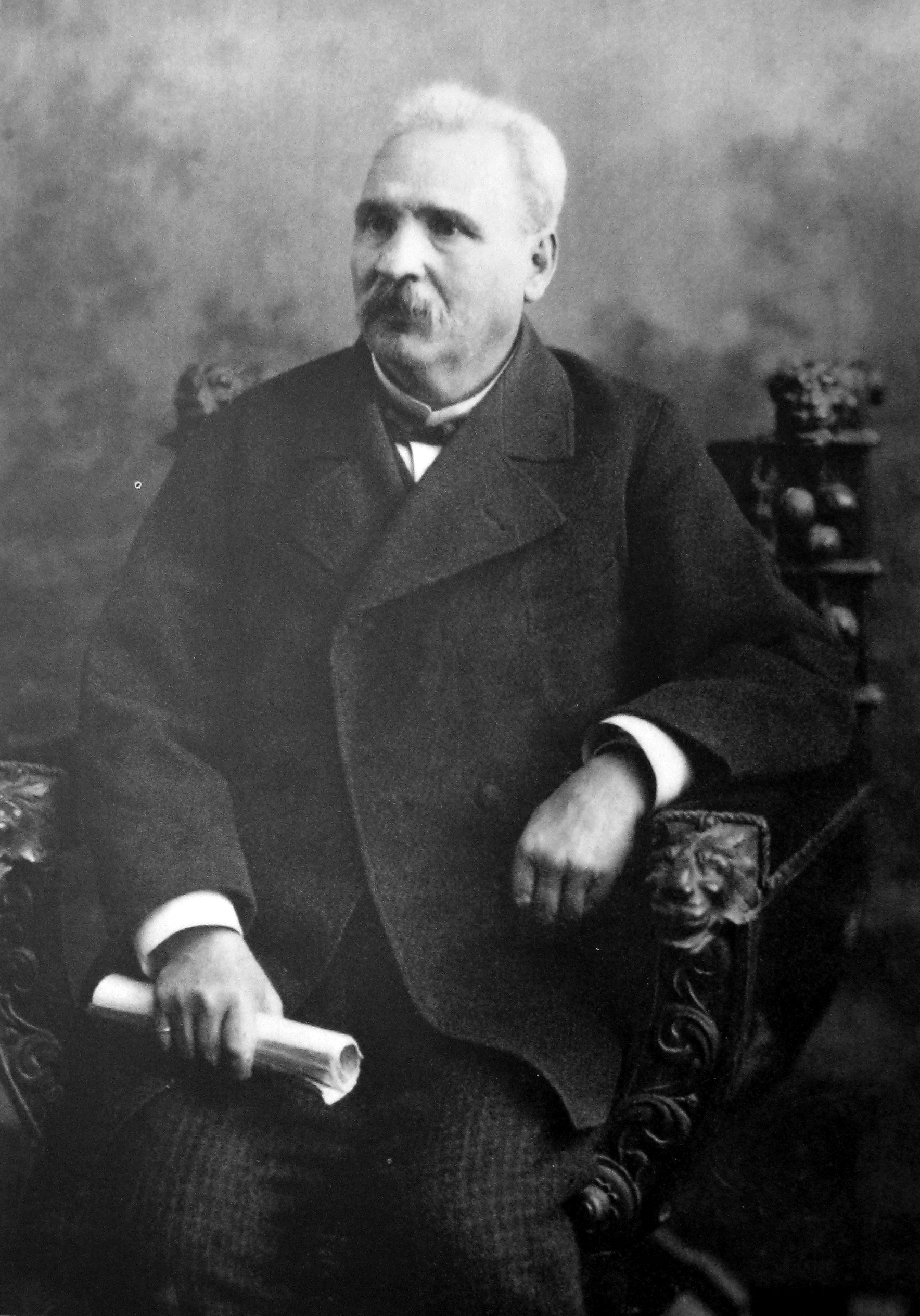
- Born: 17 November 1827; Tarnovo, Ottoman Empire
- Died: 1 July 1895 (aged 67); Sofia, Principality of Bulgaria
- Resting place: Central Sofia Cemetery; 42°42′47.5″N 023°20′02.4″E
- Occupations: Poet, Publicist, Politician
- Spouse: Irina Raykova
- Children: Pencho Slaveykov

Petko Rachov Slaveykov (Bulgarian: Петко Рачов Славейков) (17 November 1827 OS – 1 July 1895 OS ) was a Bulgarian poet, publicist, politician and folklorist.

== Biography ==
=== Early years and educational activity ===
Slaveykov was born in Tarnovo to the family of the coppersmith Racho. Slaveykov's great-grandfather's roots were in Yakoruda, Ottoman Macedonia, but later he moved to Tryavna. His grandfather settled afterwards in Tarnovo. His mother, Penka, died during the birth but miraculously, he survived. In the village of his mother, Vishovgrad, Petko saw nightingales (slavey in Bulgarian), which impressed him so much that he decided to change his family name to Slaveykov.

Slaveykov studied consecutively in Tarnovo, Dryanovo, Tryavna and the Transfiguration Monastery, and also self-educated himself by reading books in the monastery libraries near Tarnovo. He also read the noted Istoriya Slavyanobolgarskaya by Paisius of Hilendar, and later studied in Svishtov (under Emanuil Vaskidovich), extended his knowledge of Greek and got acquainted with the works of Western European and Serbian literature.

Slaveykov became a teacher in his home town in 1843, but was expelled for the famous satirical poem Tarnovo became famous for renowned Greek bishops, and consecutively taught in various towns, including Vidin, Vratsa, Pleven, Berkovitsa, Lyaskovets, Byala and Elena. He taught according to the Bell-Lancaster method and meanwhile continued to educate himself. Slaveykov worked as a teacher in the first class school in Elena and named it Daskalolivnitsata ("the Teacher Moulder").

=== Cultural activity and Istanbul period ===
Slaveykov engaged in important cultural and educational activity and had collected 2263 folk songs, sayings and proverbs by 1847. Nikola Mihaylovski introduced him to the Russian poets and writers of the time. From 1852, Slaveykov began to publish his first books: Smesena kitka, Pesnopoyka and Basnenik. He wrote the poem Boyka voyvoda in 1853 influenced by the revolutionary events surrounding the Crimean War (1853-1856), as well as many revolutionary songs. After the unsuccessful Uprising of Dyado Nikola in Tarnovo in 1856, Slaveykov concentrated his efforts in the awakening of national consciousness among Bulgarians. As a teacher in Targovishte he issued the satirical newspaper Gayda and after working in Varna for some time left for Istanbul, where he was invited in 1864 to edit a full Bulgarian translation of the Bible (in an east Bulgarian dialect) by the Bulgarian Bible Society. The entire translation was printed in Istanbul in 1871 and was of great importance for the establishment of the east Bulgarian vernacular as the common one.

In Istanbul Slaveykov issued the newspapers Gayda (1863-1867) and Makedoniya (1866-1872) and the magazines Ruzhitsa (1871), Pchelitsa (1871), Chitalishte (1872-1873), Zvanchatiy glumcho (1872), as well as the newspapers Shutosh (1873-1874) and Kosturka (1874). He established himself as arguably the most famous Bulgarian writer in Istanbul in the time, issued more than 60 books, newspapers and magazines, both original and translated. He took part in the struggle for an autonomous Bulgarian church and later became a teacher in the newly established Bulgarian Exarchate. He was arrested for the article Dvete kasti i vlasti in the Makedoniya newspaper and accused of relations with the Bulgarian Revolutionary Central Committee in Bucharest.

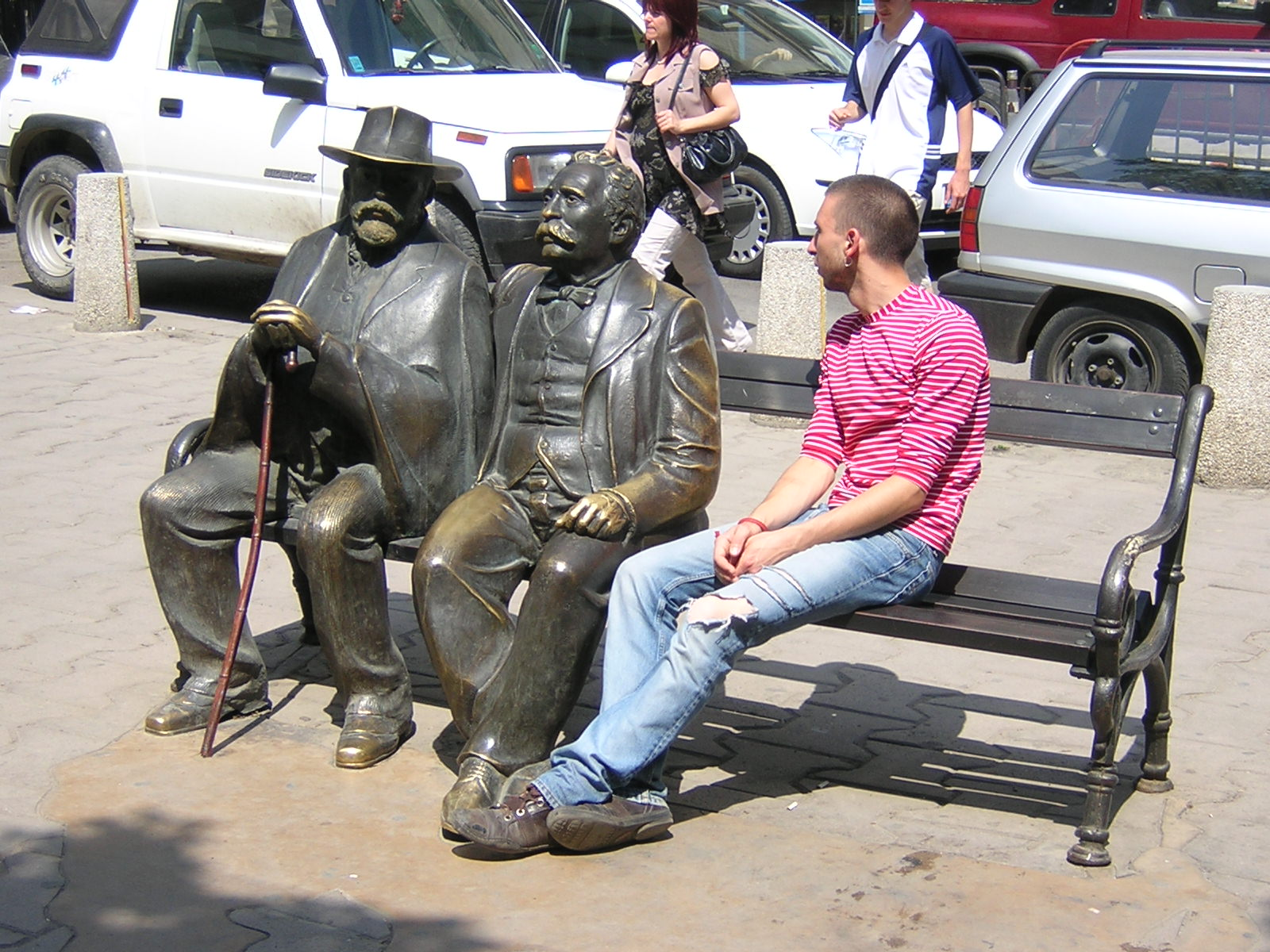
Petko Slaveykov (right sculpture) and his son Pencho (left sculpture) as immortalized on Slaveykov Square in Sofia

=== Revolutionary and political activity ===
In 1873 Slaveykov wrote the well-known poem Izvorat na Belonogata ("The Spring of the White-Legged") and founded the Bulgarian high school in Odrin in 1874, where he countered the Greek influence over the Bulgarians. Later a teacher in Stara Zagora, Slaveykov wrote revolutionary poems and was enchained and imprisoned after the April Uprising. In the Ottomans' massacre of Stara Zagora, his manuscripts and the 15,000 collected folk sayings were burnt and lost. After his liberation from Ottoman imprisonment by the Russians during the Russo-Turkish War of 1877-78, he drew closer together with the Russian forces, led the detachment of General Mikhail Skobelev through the Balkan Mountains, witnessed the Battle of Shipka and accompanied the army to San Stefano near Istanbul.

After the Liberation of Bulgaria from Ottoman rule in 1878, Slaveykov struggled for a democratic constitution together with Petko Karavelov as a deputy in the first Grand National Assembly, became the Chairman of the National Assembly of Bulgaria in 1880, Minister of the Enlightenment and the Internal Affairs (1880-1881), issued the newspapers Osten (1879), Tselokupna Balgariya (1879), Nezavisimost (1880-1883), Tarnovska konstitutsiya (1884), Istina (1886), Sofiyski dnevnik (1886) and Pravda (1888).

Because of his pronouncedly democratic ideas and his participation in the political struggles he was arrested, forbidden to teach and his pension was reduced. Deeply embittered, he died on 1 July 1895 in Sofia.

Slaveykov had a total of eight children, among them the politicians Ivan Slaveykov and Hristo Slaveykov, the publicist Racho Slaveykov and the fellow poet Pencho Slaveykov.

== Works ==
Both in his original and imitative works Slaveykov further developed the Bulgarian language. He wrote patriotic songs and poems, and love and landscape lyric poetry under the influence of Russian poets Aleksandr Pushkin, Afanasy Fet and Nikolay Karamzin. Parts of his historical patriotic poems likely influenced by Paisius' Istoriya Slavyanobolgarskaya have been preserved: Krumiada, Kralev Marko, Samuilka, Gergana. He issued two collections of folk songs, in 1860 and 1868, and restored the collected proverbs, numbering 17,000. Besides being a poet, writer and journalist, Slaveykov also left his mark on the Bulgarian literature as a translator, philologist, folklorist, the originator of Bulgarian children's literature and author of textbooks. He also worked in the spheres of geography, history and biography. He printed Balgarski pritchi, poslovitsi i harakterni dumi, researched the Bulgarian customs, ritual system, demonology and psychology, and wrote under many pseudonyms.

== Honour ==
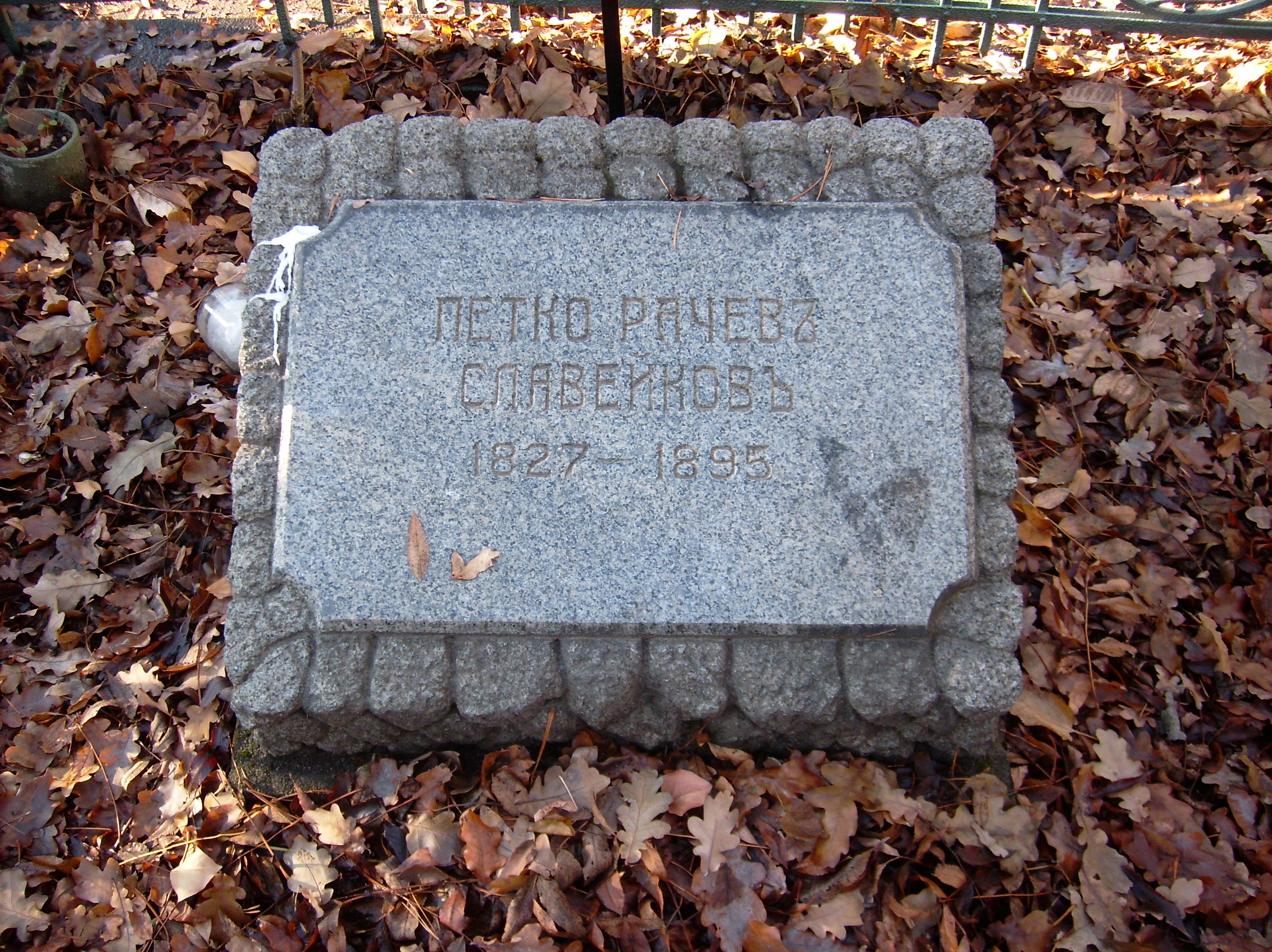
Petko R. Slaveykov's Grave in Sofia Central Cemetery (42°42′47.5″N 023°20′02.4″E)

Slaveykov Peak in Imeon Range on Smith Island in the South Shetland Islands, Antarctica is named for Petko Slaveykov.
