= Science and technology in Bulgaria =

Science and technology in Bulgaria is carried out in a variety of institutions, largely dominated by the Bulgarian Academy of Sciences (BAS) and several universities.

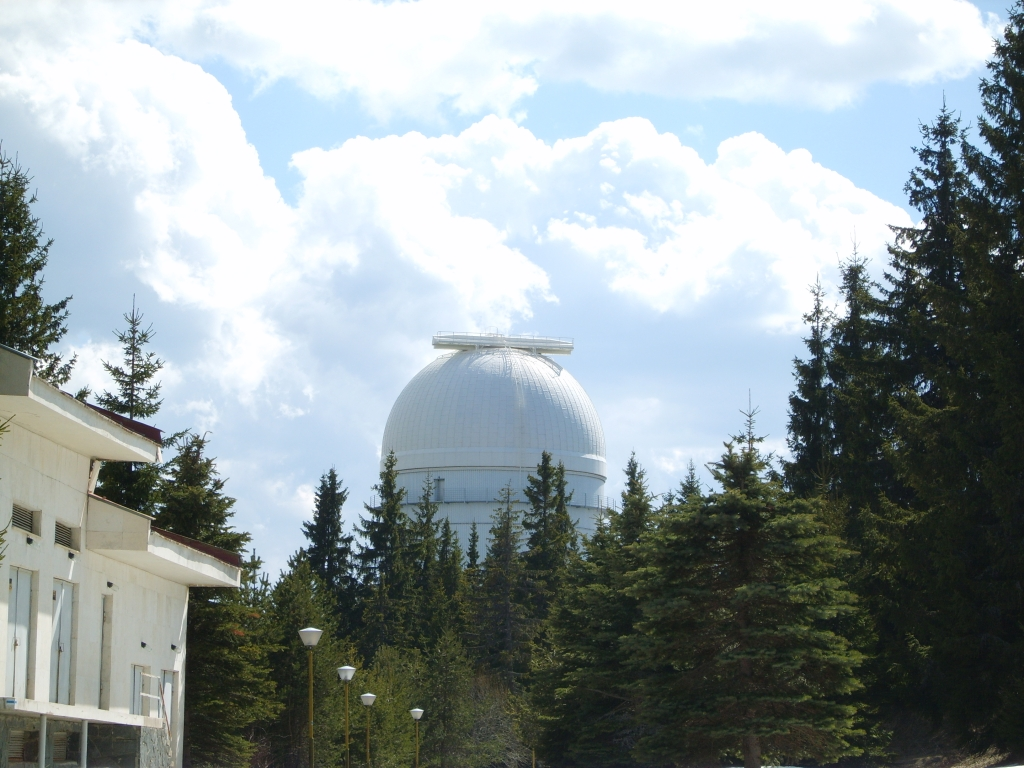
Dome of the 2-meter RCC telescope at Rozhen Observatory, the largest optical telescope on the Balkans

== Overview ==
Spending on research and development is low, amounting to 0.78% of GDP, and the bulk of public R&D funding goes to the Bulgarian Academy of Sciences (BAS). Private businesses accounted for more than 73% of R&D expenditures and employed 42% of Bulgaria's 22,000 researchers in 2015. The same year, Bulgaria ranked 39th out of 50 countries in the Bloomberg Innovation Index, the highest score being in education (24th) and the lowest in value-added manufacturing (48th). By 2020, Bulgaria ranked 42nd, but with an increase in value-added manufacturing to 33rd. Bulgaria was ranked 37th in the Global Innovation Index in 2025.

Chronic government underinvestment in research since 1990 has forced many professionals in science and engineering to leave Bulgaria. Despite the lack of funding, research in chemistry, materials science and physics remains strong.

High levels of female participation in science and engineering, a legacy of the Socialist era, are characteristic for all fields of research.

== Fields of research ==
=== ICT ===
Three per cent of economic output is generated by the information and communication technologies (ICT) sector where 40,000 to 51,000 software engineers are employed. More than a quarter of Bulgarian ICT specialists are women, the highest percentage of females in ICT in any EU country. Computer science builds upon foundations laid in the Socialist era, when the country was known as a "Communist Silicon Valley" due to its key role in COMECON computing technology production. Pravetz computers were the principal mass computer series designed and manufactured in Bulgaria at the time.

Bulgaria is also a regional leader in high performance computing. The Institute of Computer and Communication Systems at BAS operates Avitohol, the most powerful supercomputer in Southeast Europe. Four smaller supercomputing clusters that do not represent true supercomputers operate in Sofia: an unnamed machine at BAS, PHYSON at Sofia University's Faculty of Physics, Madara at the Institute of Organic Chemistry at BAS, and Nestum at Sofia Tech Park. An IBM Blue Gene/P at the National Centre for Supercomputing Applications ceased operations in 2015. A new supercomputer, the Discoverer, was installed in 2021 and ranked 91st in the TOP500 in 2021.

=== Physics ===
Ivan Stranski (1897–1979) developed the molecular-kinetic theory of crystal formation and crystal growth. The results of his work on crystal structure and behaviour have had wide application in the areas of physical chemistry, metallurgy and mining. Georgi Nadjakov was among Bulgaria's top physicists, and became known for his experiments on the photoelectric effect and most notably, the discovery of photoelectrets. Nadjakov's discoveries are now widely employed in photocopier machines.

Bulgaria is an active member of CERN and has contributed to its activities with nearly 200 scientists since its accession in 1999. Bulgarian scientists took part in the L3 experiment of the Large Electron–Positron Collider in the 1980s.

=== Medicine ===
A domestic pharmaceutical industry grew quickly after a Soviet-style planned economy was implemented in the late 1940s. Cytisine, a smoking cessation aid, and galantamine, a drug synthesised by Dimitar Paskov and used to treat cognitive impairment in Alzheimer's disease, are some of the drugs developed by Bulgarian researchers. Generic drugs form the backbone of the industry, although innovative drugs make up 75% of the market in terms of value. There is a well-developed drug research base in hospitals along with highly qualified researchers and drug manufacturing by EU standards, but poor funding and limited experience in early stage clinical trials are a weakness. Sopharma AD has been a leader in pharmaceutical research since the 1950s.

Dr. Georgi Stranski University Hospital in Pleven was the first hospital to implement the Da Vinci Surgical System in the country and operates two systems. Two other hospitals in Sofia, Acibadem City Clinic Tokuda Hospital and Doverie, each operate one Da Vinci system. The total number of the systems in Bulgaria was 8 in 2021.

=== Nuclear energy ===
Bulgaria began studying nuclear energy for power generation as early as 1956. An agreement with the Soviet Union to begin construction of industrial-scale nuclear reactors was reached ten years later, in 1966. Today, more than a third (34.8%) of electricity in the national grid is produced by nuclear reactors at the Kozloduy Nuclear Power Plant. Commercial power generation from its two VVER-1000 units is supported by a diverse research, education and engineering capacity spread among several institutions. Sofia University and the Technical University of Sofia train engineers at the Nuclear Engineering and Thermal and Nuclear Power departments, respectively.

The Institute for Nuclear Research and Nuclear Energy (INRNE) of the Bulgarian Academy of Sciences is mostly focused on research and development. It is currently building the largest particle accelerator in Southeast Europe, a cyclotron that is expected to produce up to 25,000 doses for radiotherapy once completed. Equipment was delivered in 2016, but a new building for the center is yet to be constructed. INRNE also owns an IRT-2000 research reactor that achieved first criticality in 1961, but has been shut down in 1999 and awaiting reconstruction since then.

Until 1992, when the government of Filip Dimitrov ordered an end to uranium mining, Bulgaria was extracting 645 tonnes of uranium annually, and produced yellowcake. The material was shipped to the USSR for processing, and then returned to Bulgaria as fuel for the Kozloduy power plant.

=== Space exploration ===
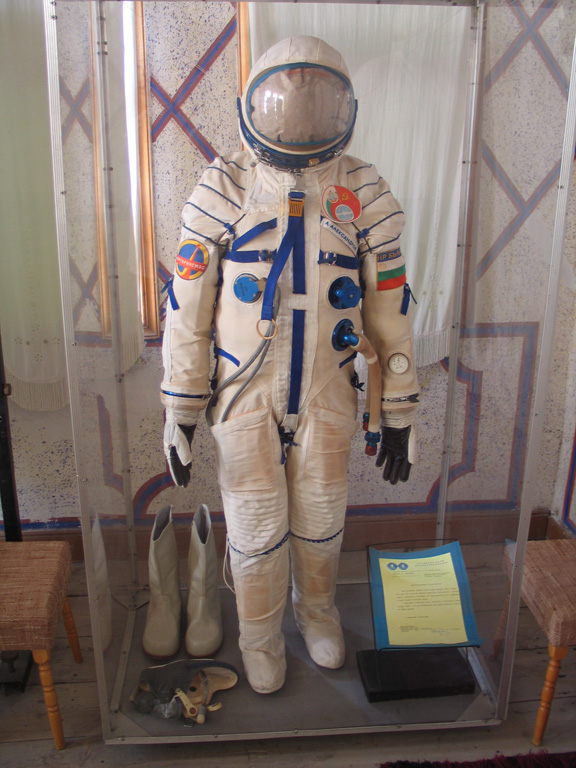
The Sokol space suit used by cosmonaut Aleksandar Aleksandrov

Bulgaria has made numerous contributions to space exploration. These include two scientific satellites, Bulgaria 1300 and Bulgaria 1300-II, more than 200 payloads and 300 experiments in Earth orbit, as well as two cosmonauts since 1971. Bulgaria was the first country to grow wheat and vegetables in space with its Svet greenhouses on the Mir space station. It was involved in the development of the Granat gamma-ray observatory and the Vega program, particularly in modelling trajectories and guidance algorithms for both Vega probes. The supercomputer developed by IZOT for the mission was later used by the Soviet Union for nuclear fusion simulations.

Bulgarian instruments have been used in the exploration of Mars, including the VSK spectrometer that took the first high quality spectroscopic images of Martian moon Phobos with the Phobos 2 probe. Cosmic radiation en route to and around the planet has been mapped by Liulin-ML dosimeters on the ExoMars TGO. RADOM-7, an instrument of the Liulin class, has been fitted to the Chandrayaan-1 lunar probe, while other versions of the Liulin operate on the International Space Station. Bulgaria's first geostationary communications satellite—BulgariaSat-1—was launched by SpaceX in June 2017. Endurosat One became the first Bulgarian CubeSat to be inserted into orbit in July 2018.

The Rozhen Observatory, the largest in Southeastern Europe, the Belogradchik Observatory and the Shumen University Observatory are Bulgaria's main astronomical observatories. Several smaller "public observatories" with planetaria, focused on educational and outreach activities, are located in various towns across the country. Astronomer Georgi Mandushev headed the team of scientists, which discovered TrES-4b.

=== Aviation ===
Sofia Airport hosts one of Lufthansa Technik's 12 aircraft maintenance and repair facilities in Europe. A significant expansion worth $42 million was completed in 2017, expanding staff to 1,300 engineers and mechanics, adding a new multi-purpose building, hangar and workshops, and increasing capacity to eight production and servicing lines. The facility services mostly Airbus A320, Boeing 737 and Embraer-series aircraft. A few companies like Niki Rotor Aviation and Aeroplanes DAR form a small manufacturing industry, producing ultralight aircraft in limited numbers.

Asen Yordanov (1896–1967), the founder of aeronautical engineering in Bulgaria, worked as an aviator, engineer and inventor; he also contributed to the development of aviation in the United States. He played a significant role in U.S. aircraft development (mostly bomber and carrier-based aircraft) and took part in many other projects. Yordanov created the first Bulgarian airplane, the "Diplan Yordanov-1", in 1915. Captain Simeon Petrov of the Bulgarian Air Force invented the world's first purpose-built air-to-surface bomb, which included innovations such as an aerodynamically stabilizing x-tail and an impact detonator. To this day the majority of aircraft bombs in the world follow Petrov's 1912 design. The Bulgarian Air Force deployed the original prototype, thus becoming the first military force in the world to conduct tactical airplane bombing sorties during a full-scale war (the First Balkan War in 1912).

=== Antarctic exploration ===
Since the 1980s, Bulgaria maintains an active exploration program of the Antarctic region. Following an unsuccessful landing attempt at Cape Vostok on the northwestern extremity of Alexander Island, two prefabricated huts were assembled on Livingston Island between 26 and 29 April 1988 by a four-member Bulgarian party supported logistically by the Soviet Research Ship Mikhail Somov. The facilities were later refurbished and inaugurated as a permanent base on 11 December 1993. An expansion programme at St. Kliment Ohridski including the construction of a new multi-purpose building was carried out between 1996 and 1998 and subsequently.

Some of the expeditions resulted in the publishing in 2009 of a comprehensive topographic map, including Greenwich, Snow, Robert and Smith islands.

== See also ==
- Az Buki
