= List of hospitals in Bulgaria =

This is a list of hospitals in Bulgaria.

== Sofia ==
- Acibadem City Clinic Tokuda Hospital
- Aleksandrovska University Hospital
- Lozenetz Hospital
- Pirogov Hospital
- Queen Giovanna Hospital
- St. Ekaterina Hospital
- National Oncology Centre - Sofia

== Plovdiv ==
- University Hospital St. George - Plovdiv
- City Hospital "Dr. Georgi Stranski"
- Plovdiv Medical University

== Varna ==
- University Hospital St. Marina – Varna
- Department of General and Operative Surgery - Varna
- Medical Center Varna
- Naval Hospital

== Pleven ==
- Dr. Georgi Stranski University Hospital
