= Vladimir Karolev =

Bulgarian economist and politician (1961–2021)

Member of the Municipal Council of Sofia
- In office 2003–2011

Personal details
- Born: 31 July 1961 Varna, People's Republic of Bulgaria
- Died: 21 October 2021 (aged 60) Sofia, Bulgaria
- Party: NDSV

Vladimir Karolev (Bulgarian: Владимир Каролев; 31 July 1961 – 21 October 2021) was a Bulgarian economist and politician. A member of the National Movement for Stability and Progress (NDSV), he served on the Municipal Council of Sofia from 2003 to 2011.

== Biography ==
=== Early life and education ===
Karolev was born in Varna on 31 July 1961. He completed his compulsory military service in Musachevo as a counterintelligence officer. He completed a master's degree in international economic relations at the Karl Marx Higher Institute of Economics in 1986, a master's in business administration at the University of Alberta in 1993, and a master's in real estate economics at the University of Reading in 2014.

=== Political career ===
Karolev became famous in the mid-1990s due to his authorship of numerous articles on economics. In 2001, he actively participated in the NDSV election for Simeon Saxe-Coburg-Gotha. In 2003, he was elected to the Municipal Council of Sofia and was re-elected in 2007 and 2011. In 2011, he unsuccessfully ran for mayor of Sofia. That year, he resigned from the municipal council to focus on his professional career.

=== Disappearance and death ===
On 9 May 2021, Karolev disappeared following a splitboard accident on Todorka. He was rescued after a 12-hour operation and was found in critical condition. He was hospitalized in Razlog and placed in a medically induced coma. He was then transported to Pirogov Hospital in Sofia and placed in the intensive care unit. In September 2021, he was transported to Acibadem City Clinic Tokuda Hospital. There, he died on 21 October 2021, at the age of 60.
