= Vera Mutafchieva =

Bulgarian writer and historian (1929–2009)

Vera Mutafchieva (Bulgarian: Вера Мутафчиева; March 28, 1929 – June 9, 2009) was a Bulgarian writer and historian.

== Biography ==
Vera Mutafchieva was born in Sofia, March 28, 1929. Her parents were the historian prof. Petar Mutafchiev and Nadia Triphonova.

Mutafchieva was educated at Sofia University. She obtained her PhD (1958) and DSci (1978) degrees at the Bulgarian Academy of Sciences (BAS) in Sofia.

She was a senior researcher at various institutes of the BAS (Institute of History; Institute of Balkan Studies; Institute of Demographic Studies; Institute of Literature), and was elected vice-president of BAS (1993-1996). In 2004 she was elected a member of the Bulgarian Academy of Sciences. Her research focused on the Ottoman period on which she published dozens of studies in Bulgarian and European journals. Some of her monographs were published in the USA, Turkey, and Greece.

Mutafchieva is the author of historical novels which have been translated into 11 languages. She was also the scriptwriter of the 1981 film Khan Asparuh (4th most viewed movie in Bulgaria of all time and official submission of Bulgaria for the 'Best Foreign Language Film' category of the 55th Academy Awards in 1983; international title 681 AD: The Glory of Khan ) and of two other films on contemporary subjects, as well as of "The Road", a drama on the second Bulgarian Kingdom.

From 1997 to 1998, Mutafchieva was head of the State Agency for Bulgarians Abroad. In 2008, it was revealed that she had collaborated with the secret police in communist Bulgaria. However, she is also known for her defence of women's rights in Bulgaria.

Mutafchieva died at the Lozenetz Hospital in Sofia at the age of 80. Her ashes were scattered in the Aegean Sea near the Cape Sounion.

== Awards ==
Mutafchieva was awarded with numerous national prizes and with the International Herder Prize (1980).
