= Georgi Stranski =

Bulgarian physician and politician (1847–1904)

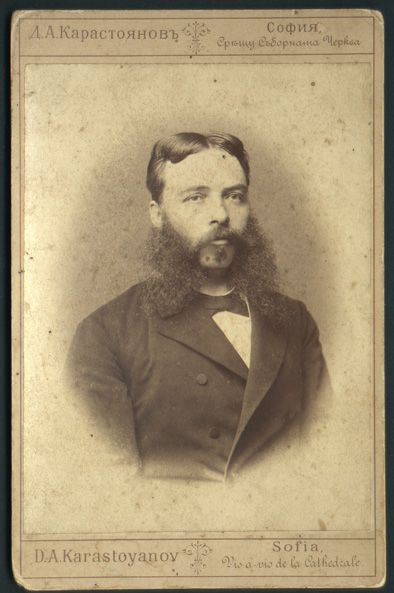
Georgi Stranski (1847–1904), Bulgarian physician and politician

Georgi Ivanov Stranski (Bulgarian: Георги Иванов Странски; 13 August 1847 – 17 January 1904) was a Bulgarian physician and politician. A close friend of Hristo Botev, Stranski was an active member of various organizations founded by Bulgarian emigrants in Romania (the United Principalities). After the Liberation of Bulgaria in 1878, Stranski was one of the leaders of the Liberal Party of Eastern Rumelia, and its successor after the Bulgarian unification in 1885, the all-Bulgarian People's Liberal Party of Stefan Stambolov. Between the accomplishment of the Bulgarian unification on 6 September 1885 and its international recognition in mid-1886, Stranski was the only ever Commissar of South Bulgaria.

== Biography ==
Georgi Stranski was born on 13 August [O.S. 1 August] 1847 in Kalofer, a Sub-Balkan town in Rumelia, or the European part of the Ottoman Empire (today in central Bulgaria). In 1864, he moved to Bucharest, at the time the capital of the autonomous United Principalities of Wallachia and Moldavia. In Bucharest, Stranski finished a medical school and graduated in medicine from the University of Bucharest in 1874. He remained in Romania as a professional physician, practicing in Buzău and Bucharest. In 1876, he published the book Medical Lectures. While residing in Romania, Stranski was a prominent member of the sizable Bulgarian diaspora there and among the founding members of two of its organizations, the Bulgarian Philanthropic Trusteeship and the Bulgarian Central Charity Society. He was particularly close to his townsman, revolutionary and national poet Hristo Botev (1848–1876), to whom he was best man.

During the Serbo–Turkish War of 1876, Stranski served in the Romanian medical mission in Serbia. For the duration of the Russo-Turkish War of 1877–1878, which brought about the liberation of Bulgaria from Ottoman rule, he was an army surgeon in the Romanian Army that fought alongside the Russians.

During the Provisional Russian Government of the Bulgarian lands that preceded the establishment of a Bulgarian government, Stranski was the regional doctor of Pleven. Stranski's political career began with his election to the Constituent Assembly of 1879 and the 1st Ordinary National Assembly of Bulgaria of the same year. In 1879 he settled in Plovdiv, the capital of autonomous Eastern Rumelia, where he continued his medical career and became one of the leaders of the Liberal Party of Eastern Rumelia. He held various high offices in the autonomous province, including Director of Finance (1880–1881), member of the Permanent Committee (1879–1880, 1882–1883) and its chairman (1883–1884), and chairman of the provincial legislative body, the Regional Assembly (1883). As a member of the Bulgarian Secret Central Revolutionary Committee, Stranski was among the most prominent participants in the organization of the Bulgarian unification of 1885, or the accession of Eastern Rumelia to the Principality of Bulgaria. Following the successful accomplishment of the unification, Stranski became the chairman of the province's provisional government, titled Commissar of South Bulgaria. He held the office until the international recognition of the unification on 5 April 1886 by the Treaty of Tophane and the first National Assembly elections in South Bulgaria in the summer of that year.

After the Bulgarian victory in the Serbo–Bulgarian War, Georgi Stranski was appointed Bulgarian diplomatic agent in Belgrade (1886–1887). In Konstantin Stoilov's short-lived government of 1887, Stranski was Minister of Internal Affairs, succeeding Vasil Radoslavov. Under Stefan Stambolov, Stranski held the office of Minister of Foreign Affairs and Religious Denominations (1887–1890), a post he took over from Grigor Nachovich. He was also elected to parliament in the 5th (1887–1890) and 6th (1890–1893) Ordinary National Assembly. Following Stambolov's resignation, Stranski continued his career as a doctor: in 1897–1899 he directed the Aleksandrovska Hospital in Sofia, and in 1899–1900 he was the regional doctor of Ruse. Between 1900 and 1904, Georgi Stranski presided over Bulgaria's Supreme Chamber of Control, the national audit institution. He died on 17 January [O.S. 4 January] 1904 in Sofia.

== Honors ==
- The Dr. Georgi Stranski University Hospital in Pleven was named after him.

Political offices
| Preceded by Grigor Nachovich | Minister of Foreign Affairs and Religion of Bulgaria; 1887–1890 | Succeeded by Stefan Stambolov |
