= NCSA =

NCSA may refer to:

- National Cadet Special Activities, aviation programs run by the American Civil Air Patrol
- National Center for Supercomputing Applications, a computer science research center in Urbana, IL
  - NCSA Common log format, a file format for log files produced by web server software
  - NCSA HTTPd, a web server that introduced the Common Gateway Interface
  - NCSA Mosaic, an early web browser instrumental to the popularization of the World Wide Web
  - NCSA Telnet, a software implementation of the Telnet protocol
  - University of Illinois/NCSA Open Source License, a free software license
- National Center for Supercomputing Applications (Bulgaria), a computer science research center in Sofia, Bulgaria
- National Child Search Assistance Act, a United States federal law enacted in 1990
- National Cyber Security Authority (Israel), a government organization merged into the Israeli National Cyber Directorate
- NATO Communications and Information Systems Services Agency, a deactivated agency, formerly within NATO
- Next College Student Athlete, a company facilitating collegiate athletic recruiting
- North Central Sociological Association, a regional American professional organization

== See also ==
- University of North Carolina School of the Arts (UNCSA)
- National Cybersecurity Alliance (NCA)
