= Roman Wall (Sofia) =

Coordinates: 42°41′2.03″N 23°19′48.46″E

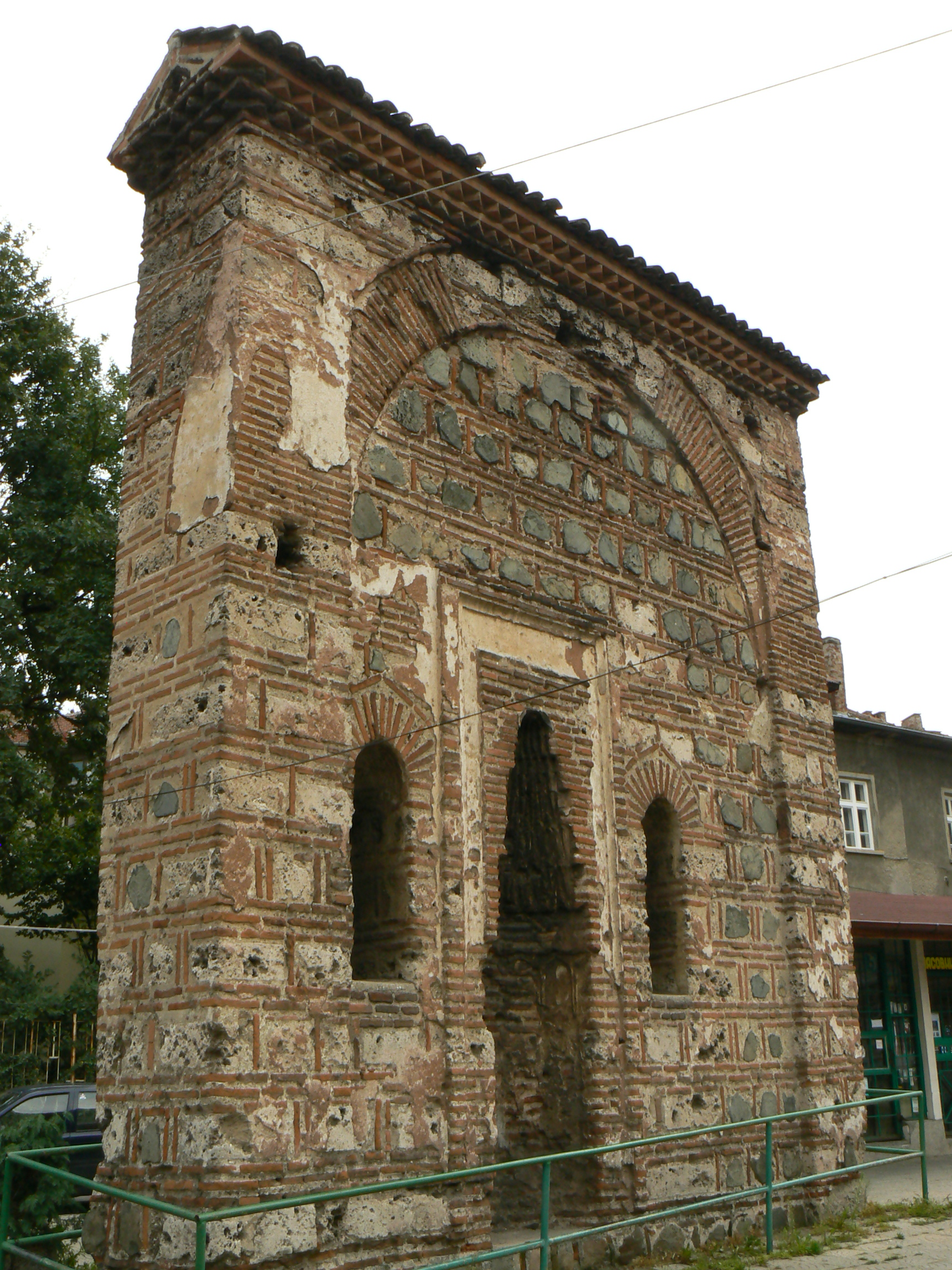
The Roman Wall in Lozenets, Sofia

The Roman Wall (Bulgarian: Римска стена, Rimska stena) is the popular but incorrect name for an early Ottoman-era architectural monument in Sofia, the capital of Bulgaria. Part of a 16th or 17th-century Islamic religious building, it now stands in the middle of a small marketplace in the Lozenets neighbourhood.

== History and architecture ==
The Roman Wall is a rectangular structure of straight rows of bricks and stones. It exhibits a characteristic Ottoman construction method of surrounding the large cut stones with sets of bricks. The wall is situated with an east–west orientation and features two windows, with a mihrab niche in between. A notched brick cornice decorates the top of the wall.

The Roman Wall was built in the 16th or 17th century, the time of the Ottoman rule of Bulgaria. The wall's exact purpose is unclear, though it is agreed that it performed an Islamic religious function. It may either be the preserved part of an eminent Ottoman Turk's tomb, or it may have formed part of a namazgâh, an open-air religious structure where the imam would perform a prayer for those embarking on the Hajj.

In the late 19th century, after the reestablishment of the Principality of Bulgaria in 1878, the Old Wall remained as a lone marker in the abandoned Turkish graveyard. In 1957, the wall underwent a reconstruction and was enlisted as a monument of culture.

Today, the wall is located in the neighbourhood of Lozenets, on the Stara Stena Street near Hristo Smirnenski Boulevard. A small marketplace exists around the wall and bears its name, and a weekly farmers' market also called "The Roman Wall" takes place every Saturday at the place.

== See also ==
- Banya Bashi Mosque
- National Archaeological Museum (Bulgaria)
