= Medical University Pleven =

Medical university in Bulgaria

Coordinates: 43°24′38″N 24°37′39″E

Medical University - Pleven
- Медицински университет - Плевен
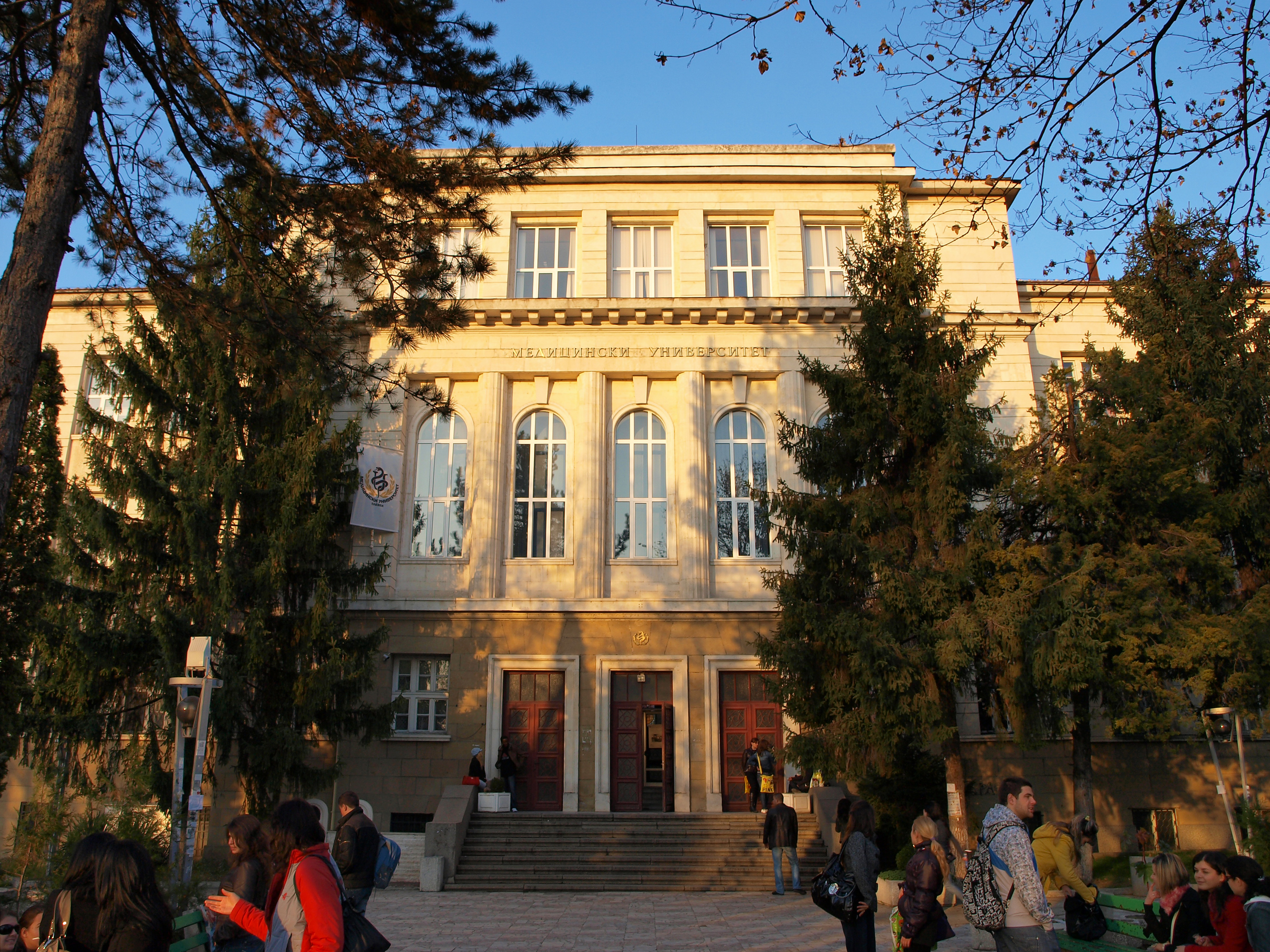
- Type: Public
- Established: 1974
- Rector: Dobromir Dimitrov
- Academic staff: 4
- Administrative staff: 341
- Students: ~3000
- Location: Pleven, Bulgaria
- Website: www.mu-pleven.bg
- Logo of Medical University Pleven

Medical University - Pleven (Bulgarian: Медицински университет — Плевен, Meditsinski universitet — Pleven) is one of the four medical universities in Bulgaria. It is the only university in Pleven and was founded in 1974 on the basis of the former regional hospital established in 1865.

The university unifies a large modern preclinical base, a hospital with specialised clinics, and research sections. It has three faculties, the Faculty of Medicine covering the subjects of medicine and rehabilitation and occupational therapy, the Faculty of Pharmacy covering the subjects of pharmacy and drug development and the Faculty of Public Health covering health care, as well as a college. There are also two hostels with a total of 315 beds in two- and three-bed rooms.

In 1997 the university added an English language Medicine programme designed for international students. This was the first English language medicine programme in Bulgaria. As of the 2000s, Medical University Pleven has had 4081 Bulgarian and 582 foreign students from 45 countries, and has about 750 new students every year, of which 2/3 are Bulgarians and the rest foreigners, 50-60% of whom are from India. Since Bulgaria's accession to the European Union in 2007, most international students originate from other EU member states.

The instruction courses in the university are carried out in two faculties and one college:

- Faculty of Medicine with the speciality of Medicine;
- Faculty of Pharmacy with the speciality of Pharmacy;
- Faculty of Public Health with the following specialities:
  - Management of Health Care;
  - Medicinal Rehabilitation and occupational Therapy;
  - Health Management;
  - Nursing
  - Midwifery.
- Medical College Pleven with the following specialities:
  - Medical Laboratory Assistant;
  - Radiology Laboratory Assistant;
  - Social Worker
  - Pharmacy Technician
  - Medical Cosmetics

== See also ==
- Dr. Georgi Stranski University Hospital
