= Lozenets, Sofia =

District of Sofia, Bulgaria

Lozenets Лозенец
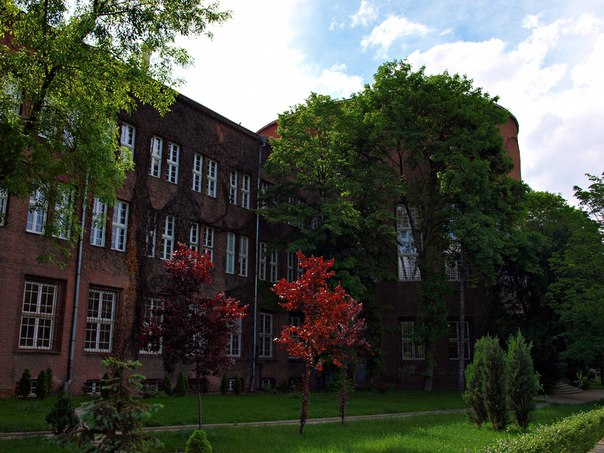
- Faculty of Biology, Sofia University

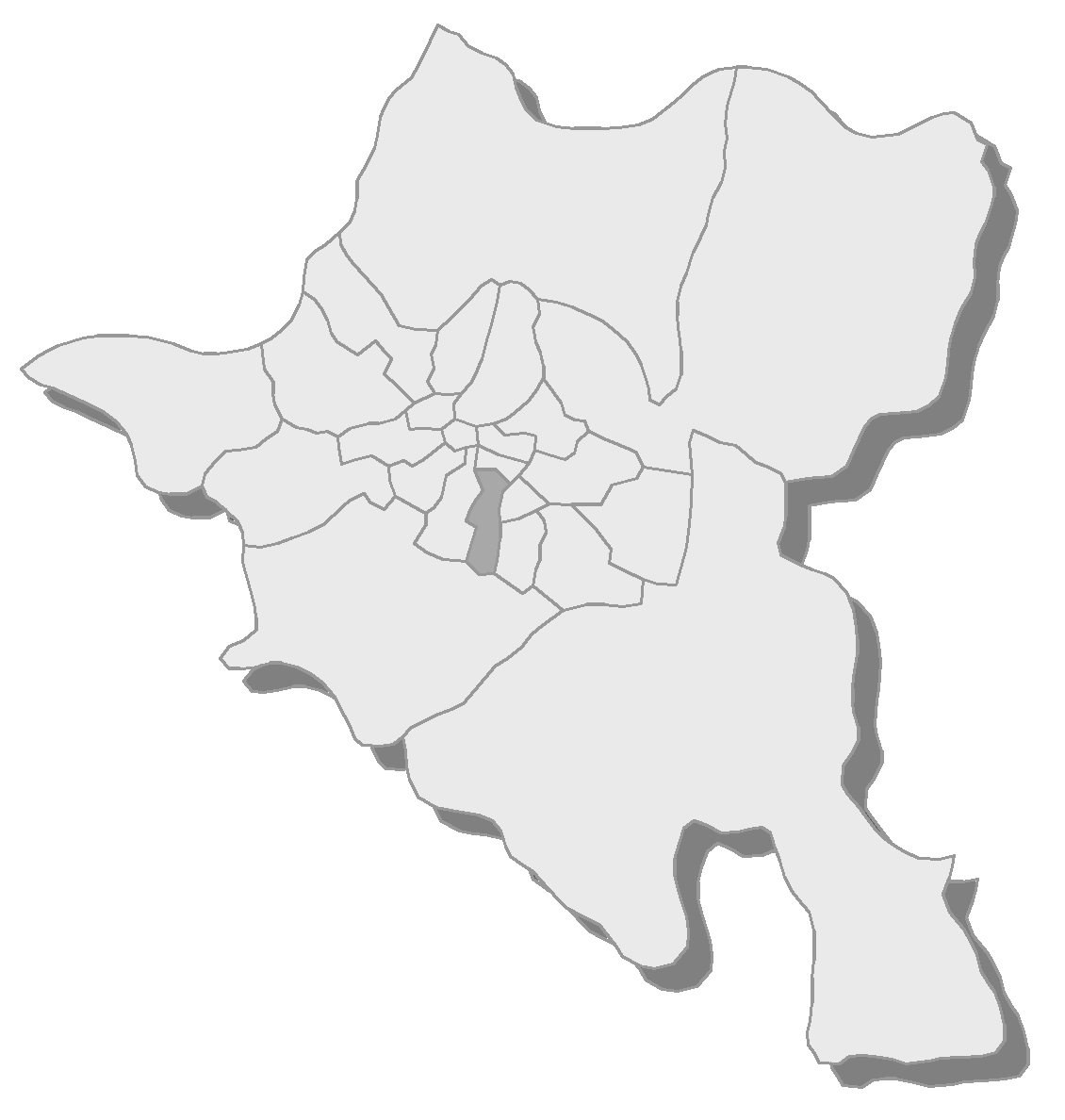
- Location of Lozenets in Sofia
- Coordinates: 42°40′30″N 23°19′35″E
- Country: Bulgaria
- City: Sofia

Government
  - Mayor: Konstantin Pavlov Democratic Bulgaria

Area
  - Total: 9.24 km^{2} (3.57 sq mi)
- Elevation: 588 m (1,929 ft)

Population (2011)
  - Total: 53,080
- Time zone: UTC+2 (EET)
  - Summer (DST): UTC+3 (EEST)
- Website: Official site of Lozenetz District

Lozenets (Bulgarian: Лозенец [ˈɫɔzɛnɛt͡s]), sometimes transliterated as Lozenetz or Lozenec, is a district and residential area located in the southern parts of Sofia, Bulgaria. As of 2011 it has 53,080 inhabitants, and an average elevation of 588 metres (1,929 ft). There are two rivers flowing through Lozenets, Dragalevska and Ajibaritsa.

== Features ==
Lozenets has many modern buildings as well as many communist-era apartment blocks and pre-1944 houses. The area is undergoing regeneration with areas experiencing intensive new construction. There are tree-lined streets, and many public parks in Sergey and the surrounding areas. The area has a direct view of Vitosha mountain. A large new church is under construction. There are many cultural and educational institutes including 13 schools and three reference libraries (Bulgarian: chitalishte). Lozenets is known as a high end residential district with a number of modern luxury residential developments. It is split over “Upper” and “Lower” sub districts with the “Lower Lozenets” directly bordering the center of Sofia. It mainly features smaller 3-4 story blocks, manor houses and detached houses. The “Upper Lozenets” was mainly developed during the 1990s and features lavish modern apartment buildings. This area has somewhat worse infrastructure with many locations deprived of central heating from the Municipal- owned central water heating operator. Yet the “Upper Lozenets” is known as a luxurious district, located on a hill raising high above the rest of the central areas of the city and bordering the South Park. In the “Upper Lozenets” are the American Embassy, Marinela Hotel and the Government Hospital, as well as the largest hospital in Central and Eastern Europe, "Tokuda". The City Center Sofia mall, European Union Metro Station and James Bourchier Metro Station are within walking distance of the district. One of the royal residences of former king Simeon - Lozenets Residence (Резиденция Лозенец, Rezidentsiya Lozenets) is located here, and the neighborhood is considered one of the most beautiful in Sofia.

== Landmarks ==
- Sofia Zoo
- Acibadem City Clinic Tokuda Hospital
- Hotel Marinela Sofia
- "Krâsta" (the Cross) locality
- The Water Tower
- Sofia Land amusement park
- The Old Wall
