= RADOM-7 =

RADOM is a Bulgarian Liulin-type instruments-type spectrometry-dosimetry instrument, designed to precisely measure cosmic radiation around the Moon. It is installed on the Indian satellite Chandrayaan-1. Another three instruments were deployed on the International Space Station. All Liulin-type instruments are designed and build by the Solar-Terrestrial Influences Laboratory at the Bulgarian Academy of Sciences.
