= University Hospital St. Marina – Varna =

Geography
- Location: Varna, Bulgaria
- Coordinates: 43.2271°N 27.9353°E

Organisation
- Affiliated university: Medical University of Varna

Services
- Beds: 1,200

Links
- Website: www.svetamarina.com
- Lists: Hospitals in Bulgaria

The University Hospital St. Marina – Varna (Bulgarian: Университетска многопрофилна болница за активно лечение "Св. Марина" - Варна) is a university hospital in Varna, Bulgaria.

The hospital has capacity of 1200 beds. It belongs to the Medical University of Varna.
