= St. Ekaterina Hospital =

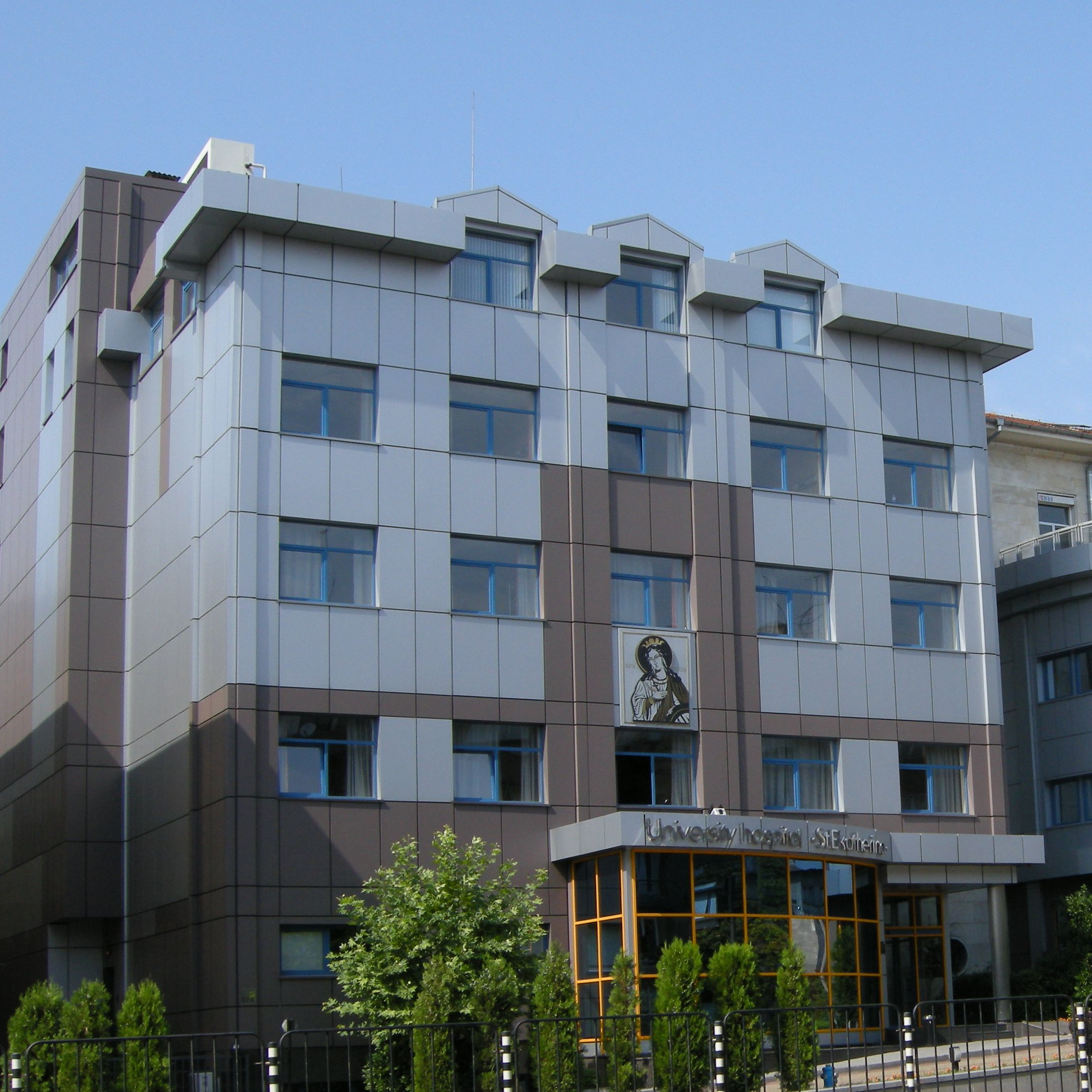
- St. Ekaterina Hospital

Geography
- Location: Sofia, Bulgaria
- Coordinates: 42°41′6″N 23°18′44″E

Organisation
- Type: Specialist
- Affiliated university: Saint Ekaterina University

Services
- Speciality: Cardiovascular

History
- Opened: 1985

Links
- Website: www.uhsek.com
- Lists: Hospitals in Bulgaria

The St. Ekaterina University Hospital (Bulgarian: университетска болница „Св. Екатерина“) is a university hospital in Sofia, the capital of Bulgaria. It was formed in 1985 as a national centre for cardiovascular diseases led by professor Aleksandar Chirkov. A second centre was established in 1989 also under Chirkov, with the uniting on 3 February 2002 to form the present hospital. The hospital is located on Pencho Slaveikov Boulevard.

== History ==
The St. Ekaterina Hospital is known for the first heart transplant in Eastern Europe (the then-Soviet bloc) in 1986, on 32 year old Rostislav Popov. The transplant was completed by Dr Aleksandar Chirkov. It is currently the only hospital in Bulgaria where heart transplants are regularly performed, with a total of 45 performed since 2003, and is the main centre for cardiac care in Bulgaria.

== Facilities ==
The hospital consists of three dynamic complexes — a diagnosis department, a hospital and an administrative and economic department. It contains over 150 beds, and has 88 doctors and 200 medical professionals. There is a cardiac surgery clinic with 4 operating rooms. They treat on average 5000 patients per year. Doctors also perform Kidney transplants in partnership with specialists from other hospitals. The hospital is involved in numerous clinical trials and research programs. It serves as a teaching hospital for cardiac care doctors and nurses. The hospital also has two seminar rooms, one with a 25 person capacity, and the other with a 170 person capacity.
