= Dr. Georgi Stranski University Hospital =

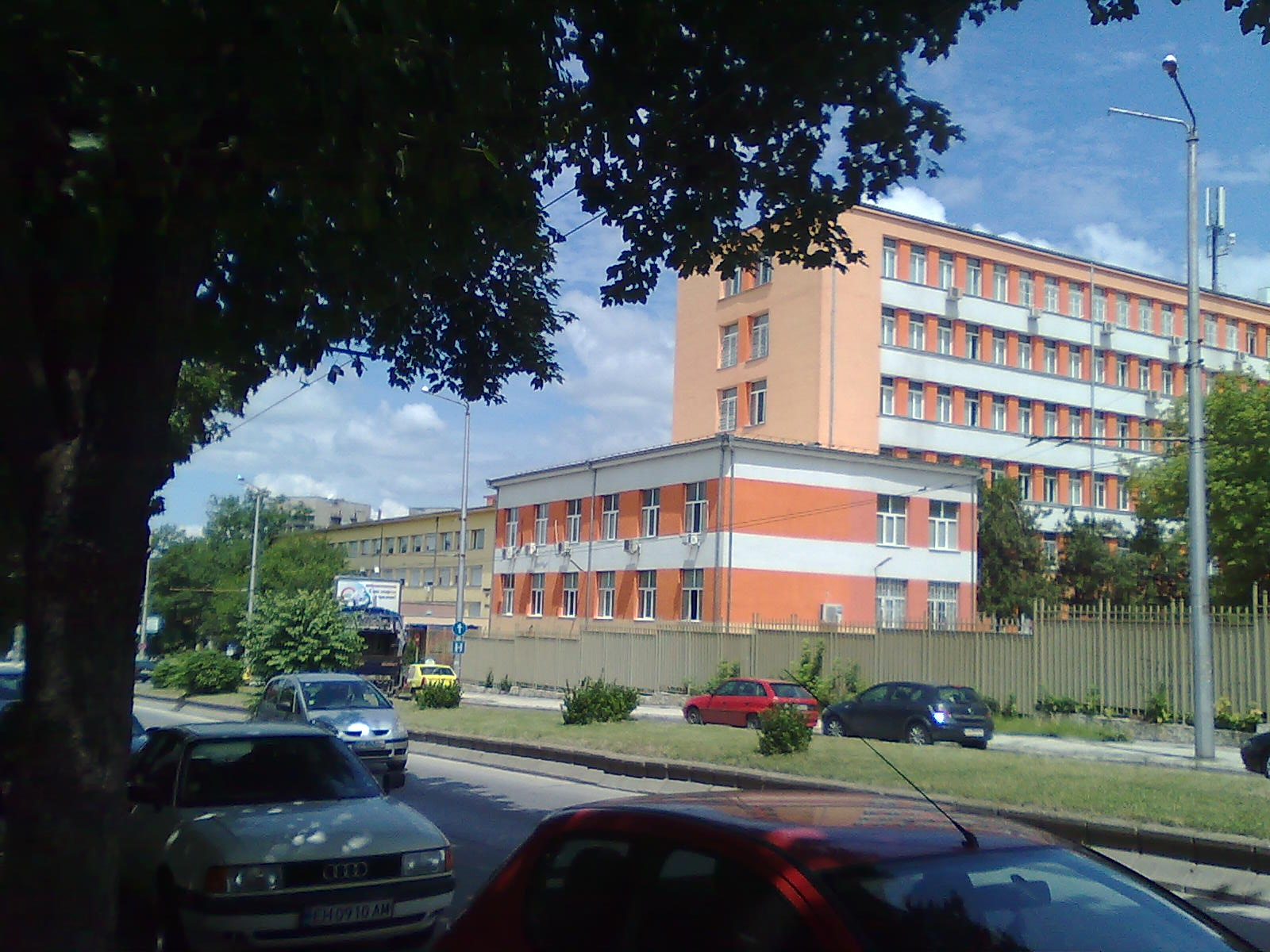
- View from Georgi Kochev Blvd.

Geography
- Location: Pleven, Pleven Province, Bulgaria
- Coordinates: 43°24′58″N 24°37′40″E

Organisation
- Care system: National Health Insurance Fund
- Type: General, teaching hospital

History
- Founded: 1865

Links
- Website: umbalpleven.com
- Lists: Hospitals in Bulgaria

Dr. Georgi Stranski University Hospital is a major hospital located in Pleven, Bulgaria. It is one of the oldest in the country, as well as the largest in northern Bulgaria.

== History ==
The hospital was established in 1865, before the Liberation of Bulgaria from Ottoman rule, as a waqf treatment center under the personal orders of Midhat Pasa. Its first location was on the grounds of the local imaret, and its staff at the time consisted only of a foreign military doctor and two servants. He died in 1869, and was replaced by Dr. Robert Geiser, a Swiss national who was in charge of the hospital until 1877.

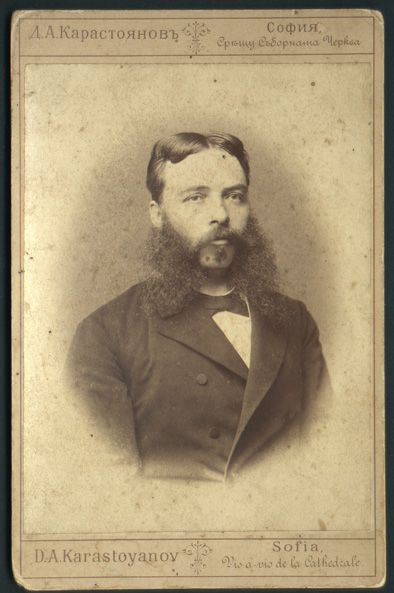
Georgi Stranski, the hospital's first manager

During the Russo-Turkish War of 1877–1878, numerous Russian surgeons were active in the area during the Siege of Plevna. Nikolay Pirogov was among them, and Bulgarian physician Georgi Stranski, a close friend of revolutionary Hristo Botev, was also present. Shortly after the war—in 1879—Stranski became the hospital's first manager, albeit only for a year. The hospital was enlarged and moved to its current location in 1896.

== Activities ==
Its departments provide care in gynecology, a full range of internal medicine treatment, surgery, orthopedics, urology, otorhinolaryngology, ophthalmology, neurology, pediatrics, dermatology, infectious diseases and psychiatry. The hospital also provides all major diagnostic procedures, emergency care and rehabilitation. Its staff consists of 430 MDs, including students and seasoned specialists, and 860 assorted specialist staff.

=== Robotics ===
The hospital is known for its robot-assisted surgery using the Da Vinci Surgical System. It is one of only three hospitals in Bulgaria operating the system, the first one to implement it in the country, and the only one with two Da Vinci systems. The robots are used for gynecological, urological and gastrointestinal surgery. Four surgical teams perform up to two robotic surgeries daily.

There is also a social robot that helps patients communicate with doctors when the latter are not physically present using online conference calls.

== See also ==
- Medical University Pleven
