= Pirogov Hospital =

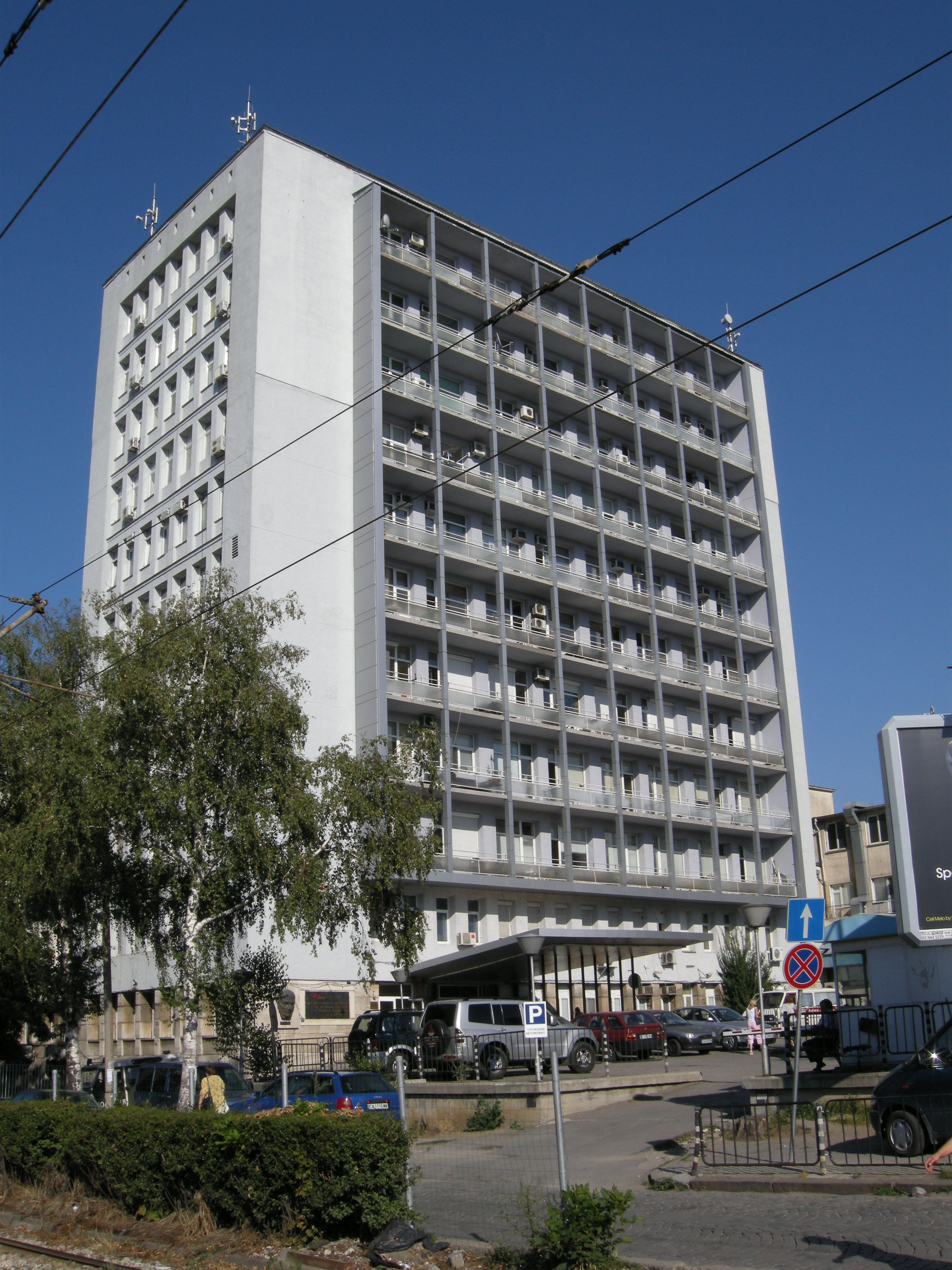

Geography
- Location: Sofia, Bulgaria
- Coordinates: 42°41′24″N 23°18′29″E

Organisation
- Care system: Private
- Type: General Hospital

Services
- Beds: 795

History
- Opened: 1951

Links
- Website: www.pirogov.bg
- Lists: Hospitals in Bulgaria

Pirogov Hospital (Bulgarian: Болница Пирогов) is a hospital for active treatment and emergency medicine in Sofia, the capital of Bulgaria. It was founded in 1951 and as of 2006 has a capacity of 795 hospital beds, 33 clinics and departments and employed 2,418 medical and other staff. It was named after Russian surgeon Nikolay Pirogov.

== Gallery ==
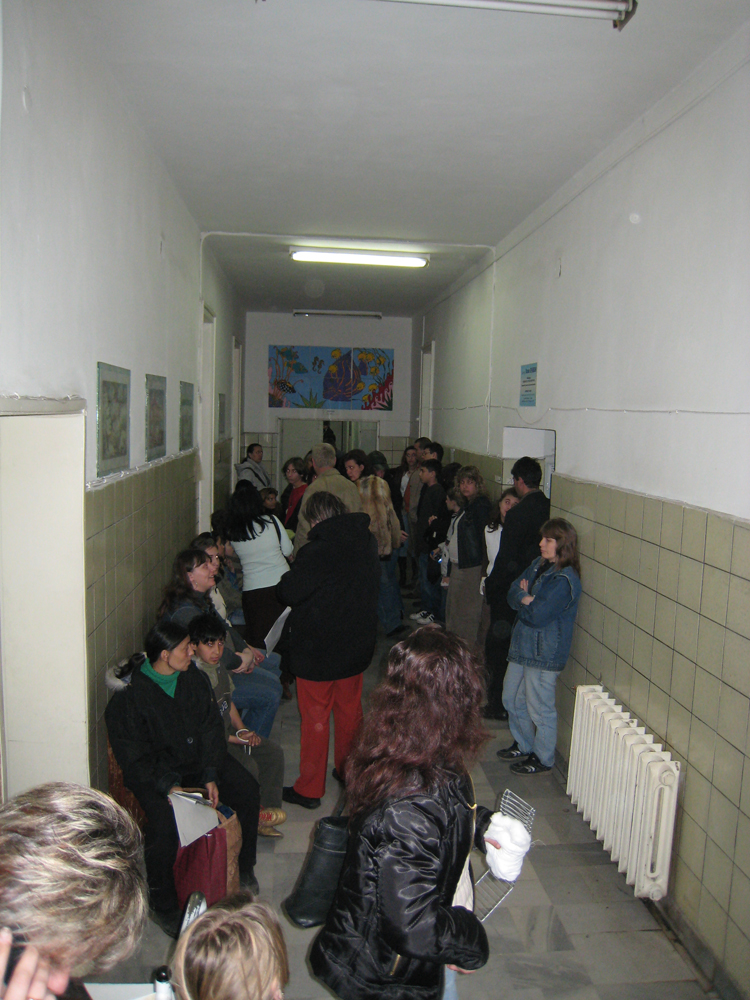
Waiting Hall to Orthopaedic trauma in Pirogov Hospital

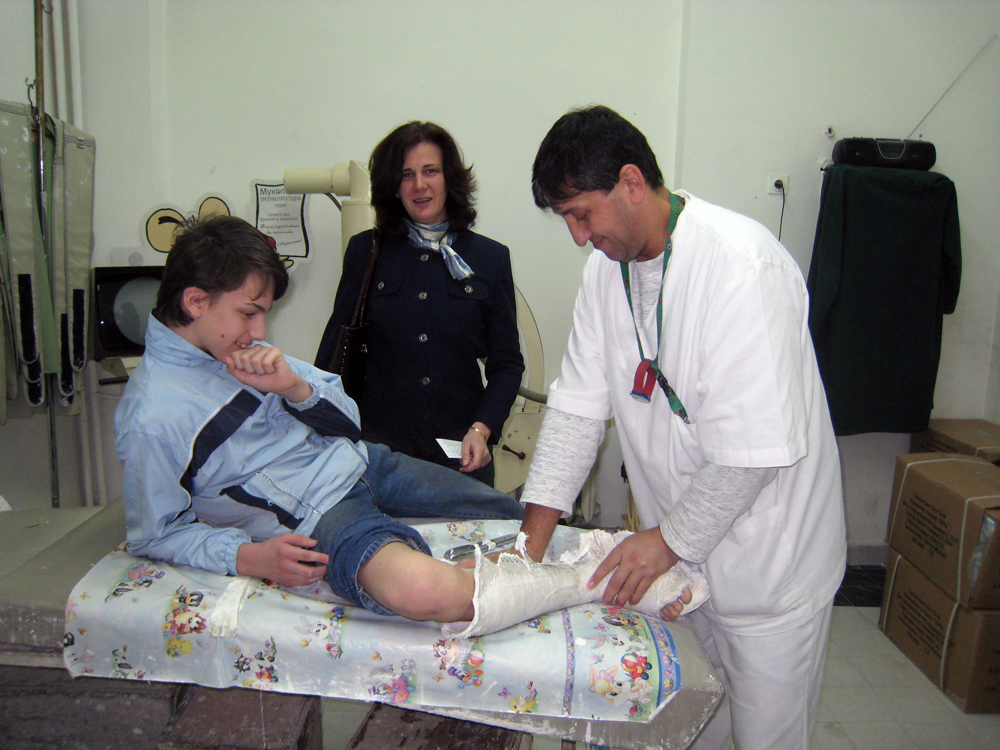
Happy end - removal of a leg cast in Pirogov Hospital
