= Queen Giovanna Hospital =

== Overview ==
Queen Giovanna Hospital

Geography
- Location: Sofia, Bulgaria
- Coordinates: 42°42′3″N 23°20′23″E

Organisation
- Type: Teaching

History
- Opened: 1936

Links
- Website: Official website

The Queen Giovanna Hospital (or Tsaritsa Yoanna Hospital; Bulgarian: болница „Царица Йоанна“) is a university hospital in Sofia, the capital of Bulgaria.

Named after Giovanna of Savoy, Tsaritsa of Bulgaria and wife of Boris III, the hospital was opened in 1936 and employs a total of 212 academic and non-academic specialists. The hospital has 24 clinics and departments.

In 2008 the physiotherapy and gastroenterology wards were renovated.
