= Medical University, Sofia =

Public university in Sofia, Bulgaria

Coordinates: 42°41′0″N 23°18′26″E

- Медицински университет
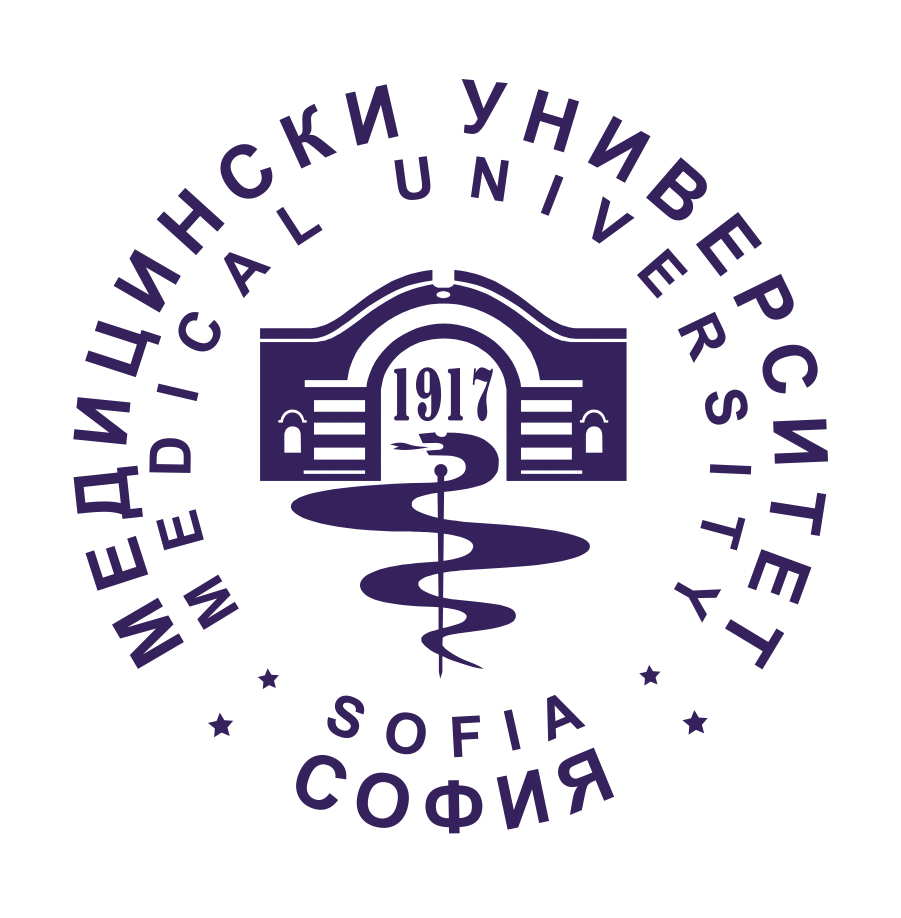
- Motto: Erudiendo, Sciendo, Curando
- Motto in English: To teach, to research, to cure
- Type: Public
- Established: 22 November 1917
- Rector: Boycho Landzhov
- Academic staff: 1969
- Students: 8311
- Location: Sofia, Bulgaria
- Website: www.mu-sofia.bg/en

University rankings

Regional – Overall
- QS Emerging Europe and Central Asia: 165 (2022)

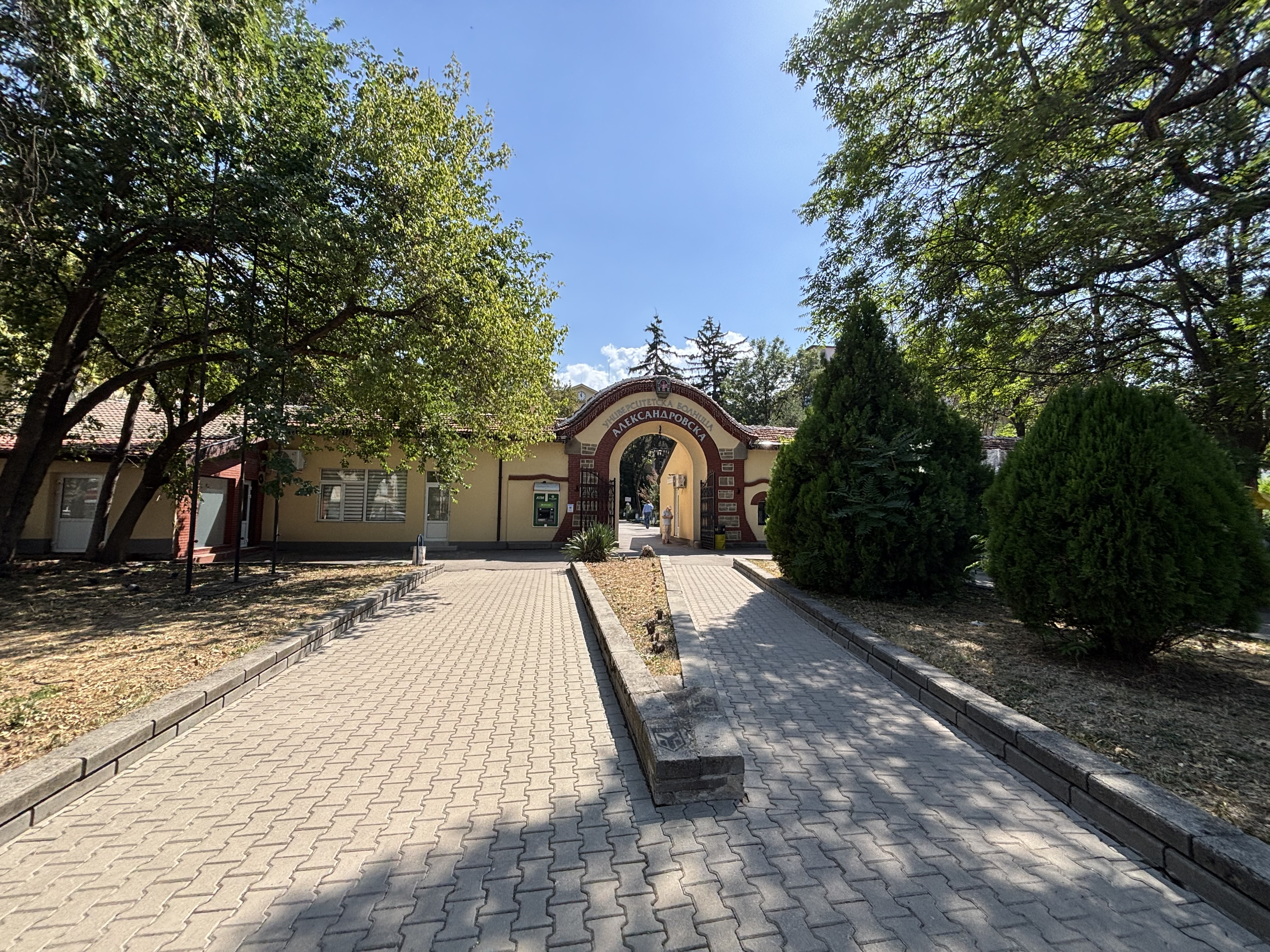
Medical University, Sofia (2026)

The Medical University, Sofia (Bulgarian: Медицински университет - София) is a public university in Sofia, Bulgaria which was founded in 1917. It is the oldest institution for higher medical education in Bulgaria.

== History ==
Initially, there was a medical faculty at Sofia University. In 1950, it was separated from Sofia University and transformed into the Medical Academy of Sofia (Медицинска Академия София). Marko Markow became its director. In 1950, the Institute for Continuing Medical Education was also founded, which is now the Queen Johanna Hospital (Царица Йоанна).

In 1954, the Medical Academy Sofia was transformed into a medical university. In 1972, after a major restructuring, it became the Medical Academy Sofia again. In 1990, the Medical Academy Sofia was dissolved and its individual medical institutes became independent medical higher education institutions. The organizational structure of faculties was reintroduced.

== Faculties ==
The university has four faculties:

- Faculty of Medicine
- Faculty of Stomatology (Dentistry)
- Faculty of Pharmacy
- Health Sciences (Обществено здраве – public health – health management) (degrees: Bachelor, Master)

By resolution of the Bulgarian Parliament on May 21, 1995, the Medical College of Sofia was renamed the Medical University of Sofia. Three medical colleges (колеж) are affiliated with the university. The university has 14 university hospitals, including the Aleksandrowska Hospital.

As is common in medical education, the program is divided into pre-clinical and clinical parts.

There are 1,969 employees (university teachers, research assistants, assistants) and approximately 4,000 students, including 800 foreign students and 120 doctoral students. At the Medical University of Sofia, 2,200 doctors complete their specialist training. Research scholarships are awarded.

== Faculty of Medicine ==
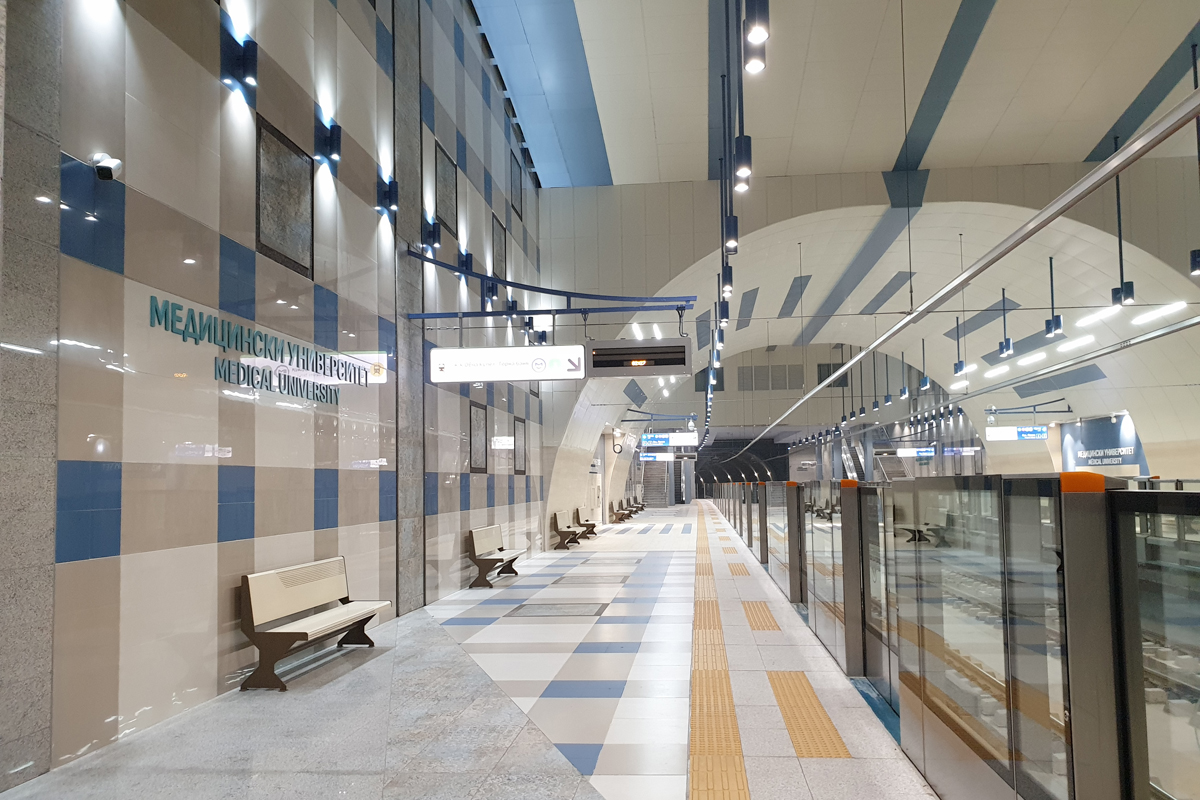
Metrostation Medical University

The Faculty of Medicine is the oldest and largest faculty of the Medical University of Sofia. It was founded in 1917 as part of Sofia University. In 1950, it was separated as an independent Medical Academy and later renamed the Higher Medical Institute Sofia. Since 1995, the institution has carried its current name, Medical University of Sofia, whose leading faculty is the Faculty of Medicine.

=== History ===
The Faculty of Medicine was established by a law of the XVII National Assembly on November 10, 1917, and promulgated by Decree No. 21 of Tsar Ferdinand. The faculty was originally part of Sofia University, was separated in 1950, and underwent several name changes in the following decades. Since 1995, it has been part of the present Medical University of Sofia.

=== Training and study programs ===
The faculty offers education in human medicine, dentistry, and pharmacy. Instruction is provided in English for international students. Tuition fees in 2026 are €9,950 per year. The faculty comprises numerous departments, including obstetrics, internal medicine, surgery, neurology, biology, medical genetics, orthopedics and traumatology, as well as many other specialized fields.

=== Infrastructure ===
The Faculty of Medicine is well connected to public transportation. Since the end of 2020, Metro Line M3 has been operating with a station located directly at the faculty (Medical University Metro Station), facilitating access for students and staff.

The faculty building underwent internal renovation in 2018, and the exterior grounds were renovated in 2025. The campus includes the Preclinical Building (Chemistry, Biology, and Physics). The Anatomy Building is located directly adjacent, and the Language Department (Latin and Bulgarian) is approximately a three-minute walk away. Nearby facilities include a pizzeria, a bookstore, and a copy shop, which are commonly used by students.

=== International Students ===
The international Part of the Faculty of Medicine has a significant international student population. Approximately 15% of students are from Germany, 20% from Greece, 15% from the United Kingdom, and the remaining students come from Italy, Scandinavia, Switzerland, the Middle East, and India. Many German students choose to study in Sofia due to the limited number of medical study places in Germany. Medical degrees obtained in Bulgaria are recognized within the European Union, including Germany.

=== Dean ===
Prof. Dimitar Ivanov Bulanov, MD, PhD

=== Departments ===
==== Preclinic ====
- Anatomy, Histology and Embryology
- Biology
- Medical Genetics
- Medical Microbiology
- Medical Physics and Biophysics
- Medical Chemistry and Biochemistry
- General and Clinical Pathology
- Physiology and Pathophysiology
- Pharmacology and Toxicology
- Epidemiology and Hygiene

==== Clinical departments ====
- Obstetrics and Gynecology
- Anesthesiology and Intensive Care
- Internal Medicine
- Dermatology and Venereology
- Infectious Diseases, Parasitology and Tropical Medicine
- Clinical Laboratory
- Clinical Immunology
- Neurology
- Neurosurgery
- Diagnostic Imaging
- Orthopedics and Traumatology
- Ophthalmology
- General and Clinical Pathology
- General Medicine
- General and Operative Surgery
- Pediatrics
- Propaedeutics of Internal Diseases
- Psychiatry and Medical Psychology
- Emergency Medicine
- Forensic Medicine and Deontology
- Cardiovascular Surgery and Invasive Cardiology
- Urology
- Otorhinolaryngology
- Pharmacology and Toxicology
- Physical Medicine and Rehabilitation
- Surgery
- Gastroenterology
- Allergology
- Pulmonary Diseases
- Endocrinology
- Nephrology
- Nuclear Medicine, Radiotherapy and Medical Oncology
- Occupational Diseases

== See also ==
- Aleksandrovska University Hospital
- List of colleges and universities
