= Lozenetz Hospital =

Lozenetz University Hospital

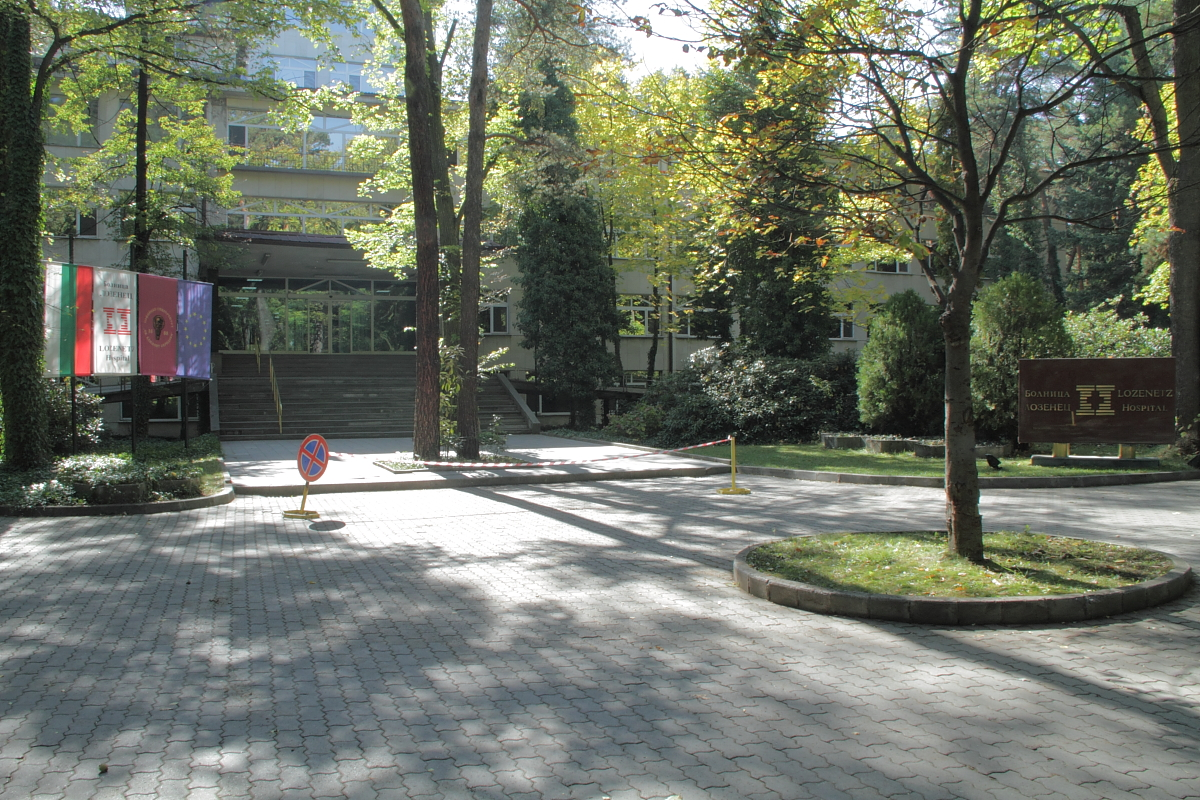

Geography
- Location: Sofia, Bulgaria
- Coordinates: 42°39′50″N 23°18′41″E

Organisation
- Care system: Private
- Funding: National Health Insurance Fund
- Type: General Hospital
- Affiliated university: Sofia University
- Network: over 20 clinics and departments

Services
- Emergency department: well equipped emergency department

History
- Opened: 1948

Links
- Website: www.lozenetz-hospital.bg

The Lozenetz University Hospital, also known as "the former Governmental Hospital" is one of the biggest hospitals in Bulgaria.

The hospital was founded in 1948 – similar to the practice in former socialist countries – as a governmental clinic with the purpose of providing health care to employees of high state and government institutions. In 1999 the hospital became a national multispecialty hospital under the management of Council of Ministers of Bulgaria.

Today the Lozenetz Hospital is a multispecialty hospital, which budget is funded by the state. All clinics in the hospital have a third level of competence, with the exception of the emergency department (first level), virology and neonatology (2nd level).

The Lozenets Hospital performs: Diagnosis, treatment and rehabilitation of patients, monitoring of pregnant women and maternity care, monitoring of chronic diseases and patients at risk of such disease, prevention and early detection of diseases and to healthcare measures, transplantation of organs, tissues and cells.

As a multispecialty hospital, all pointed out prophylactic, diagnostic and treatment activities are being performed both as well to representatives of government and public institutions, members of the Diplomatic Corps in Bulgaria and the official foreign delegations, as to all Bulgarian and foreign citizens on the basis of contracts with the National Health Insurance Fund or private health insurance funds.

University Hospital for Active Treatment "Lozenets" specializes in modern and leading diagnostic and therapeutic activities such as medical imaging, cardiac surgery, invasive cardiology, endoscopic surgery and more.

The hospital is multifarious and has 32 clinics and departments, three operating units in 22 surgical rooms, cardiac surgery, Invasive cardiology, broad and modern diagnostic center, high-tech equipment, a center for preventive and occupational medicine.

Director of the hospital is Lubomir Spasov cardiac surgeon and specialist in liver transplantation. Under his leadership and with direct participation in the University Hospital "Lozenets" for the first time in our country have done unique operations such as coronary artery bypass without ESC, etc. "Beating heart" (April 5, 2000), mitral-valve prosthesis via a unique endoscopic method (May 22, 2003), a liver transplantation from a living donor (November 26, 2004) and others.

University Hospital "Lozenets" has a modern diagnostic equipment and laboratories of the last generation.

== See also ==
- List of hospitals in Bulgaria
