= National Center for Supercomputing Applications (Bulgaria) =

- Established: 2008
- Research type: Research
- Field of research: Physical science Life science Earth science
- Address: Ul. Gourko 6, Sofia 1000
- Location: Sofia
- Affiliations: Sofia University; Technical University of Sofia; Bulgarian Academy of Sciences
- Operating agency: State Agency for Information Technology and Communications
- Website: www.scc.acad.bg

The National Center for Supercomputing Applications (Bulgarian: Национален център за суперкомпютърни приложения) is a research institution located in Sofia, Bulgaria.

It was established in 2008 with the aim of promoting and regulating high-performance processing operations of scientific information.

The NCSA works in affiliation with scientists and researchers from the Sofia University, the Bulgarian Academy of Sciences, the Technical and Medical universities in Sofia, as well as other organizations. The center is under the jurisdiction of the State Agency for Information Technology and Communications (SAITC).

When established, the center operated the only supercomputer in the Balkan region, an IBM Blue Gene/P, which was among the most powerful supercomputers in the world according to TOP500 until November 2009. It has two racks with 2,048 850 MHz processors with 8,192 cores. The system is to be upgraded with additional I/O nodes and disk space in the near future.

The supercomputer was switched off in 2015.
