= Aleksandrovska University Hospital =

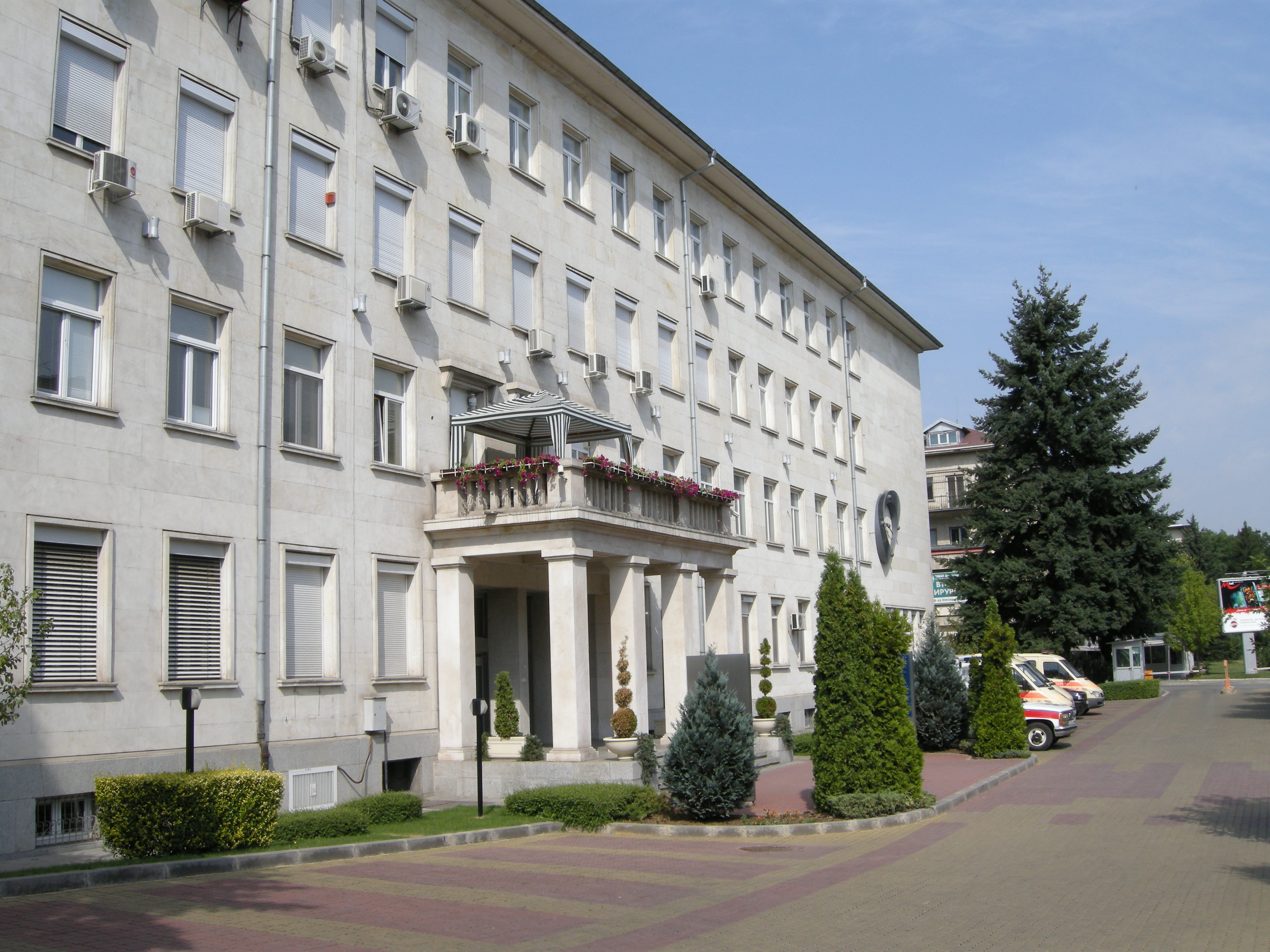

Geography
- Location: Sofia, Bulgaria
- Coordinates: 42°41′9″N 23°18′39″E

Organisation
- Affiliated university: Sofia Medical University

Services
- Beds: 1,100

History
- Founded: 1879

The Aleksandrovska University Hospital (Bulgarian: университетска болница „Александровска“) is a university hospital in Sofia, the capital of Bulgaria. It was founded in 1879 and was named after the Bulgarian Prince Alexander I Battenberg in October 1884. A military hospital between 1912 and 1919, it was the site where the Sofia Medical University was founded in 1917.

The hospital is situated on 258,000 m^{2} (2,780,000 sq ft), having a capacity of 1,100 beds and a staff of 540.
