= Liulin type instruments =

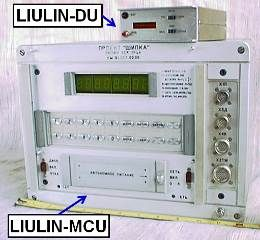

Liulin-type is a class of spectrometry-dosimetry instruments. The instruments are specific types of semiconductor-based ionizing radiation sensors that are capable of measuring the deposited energy of the particle in silicon PIN diode and also the flux of particles. The measured data output is then a time series of spectral intensity. The data about mixed field radiation (usually the secondary cosmic rays) is then used to calculate radiation dose relevant to the specific mission e.g. for a crew or aerospace equipment. The main advantages of this type of ionizing radiation detector compared to classical setups with scintillators are a significant reduction in weight, and size together with extremely low power consumption.

== History ==
The first Liulin device was developed in 1986–1988 time period for the scientific program of the second Bulgarian cosmonaut for the flight on MIR space station. After the MIR station deorbit similar experiments with revised versions of detectors continue on ISS.

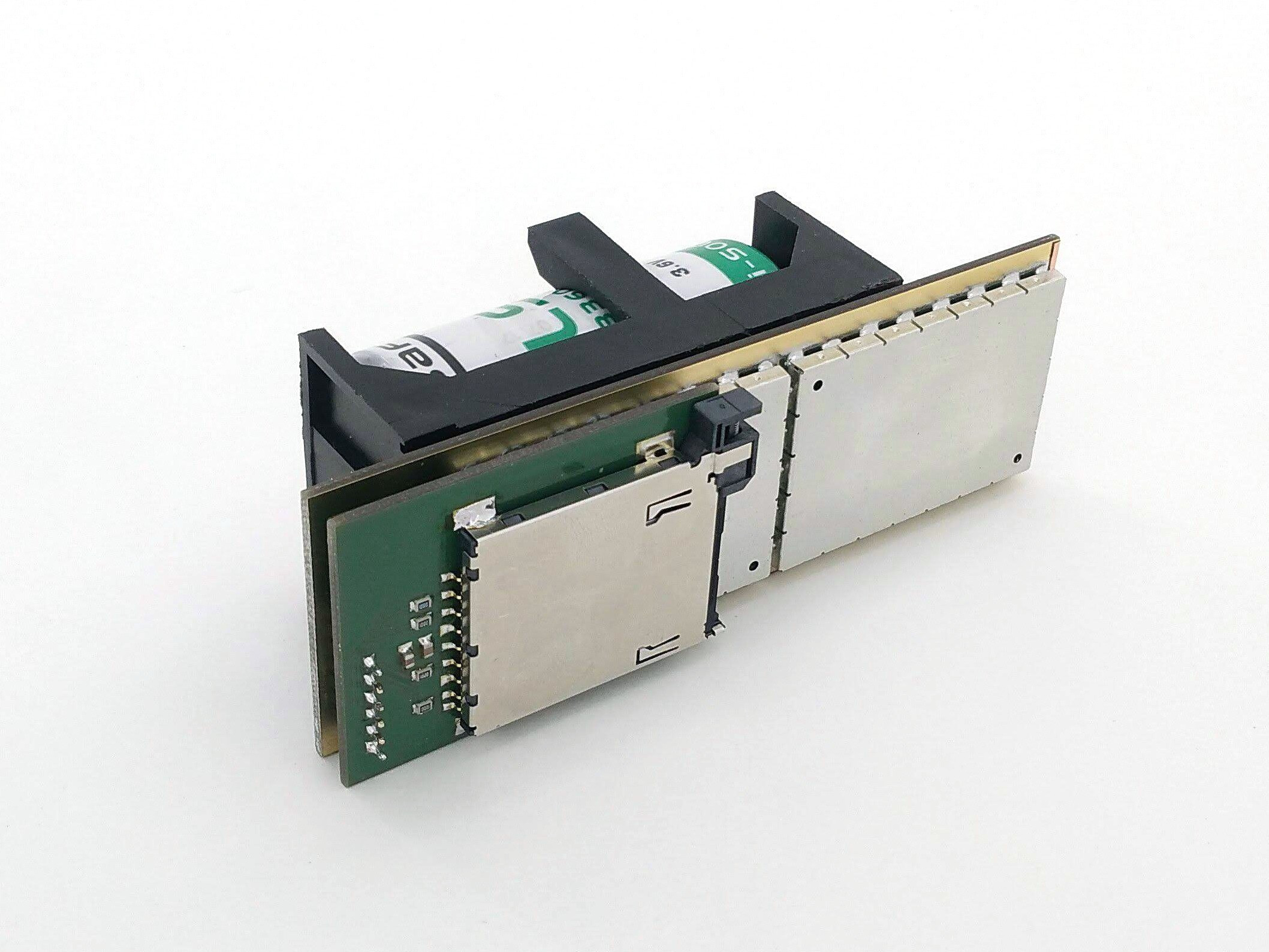
SPACEDOS02 instrument main electronics viewed from the bottom

Since the beginning of 2015, open-source hardware detectors based on the same technology called SPACEDOS have been developed. Then the SPACEDOS instruments in different variants are used on board ISS parallel to Liulin dosimeters.

== Principle of function ==
All Liulin type dosimetric instruments use one or more silicon detectors and measure the deposited energy and number of particles in the period into the detector(s) when especially the charged particles hit the device, the semiconductor material is ionized and the charge is measured allowing to calculate the dose rate and particle flux.

In detail, the signal processing in the original LIULIN instrument was based on a single silicon PIN diode followed by a charge-sensitive shaping amplifier (CSA). The number of pulses at the output of CSA above a given threshold was proportional to the particle flux hitting the detector; the amplitude of the pulses at the output of CSA was proportional to the energy deposited by particles. Further the integral of the energy depositions of the particles accumulated in the detector during the measurement interval allowed calculation of the dose rate.

The original concept has a significant drawback in poor repeatability of original LIULIN instruments because the peak detection threshold was set by a mechanical trimmer, which was sensitive to initial setup and vibrations during usage.

That situation resulted in the design of multiple open-source Liulin-equivalent instruments developed in the Czech Republic called AIRDOS and SPACEDOS, where the given energy threshold is replaced by the invention of a new type of peak detector with analog memory. The improved signal processing circuit improves multiple parameters not only the issue with different energy threshold of different Liulin detector pieces, but at the same time allows to detection of deposited energies down to noise of detector itself.

== Use cases ==
The main usage of the described semiconductor detector type is in cosmic ray dosimetry. There exist multiple variants of Liulin-type detectors which extend its use cases to airliner dosimetry. For example, there exists a variant of open-source hardware AIRDOS instruments specially designed for multiple types of UAVs.

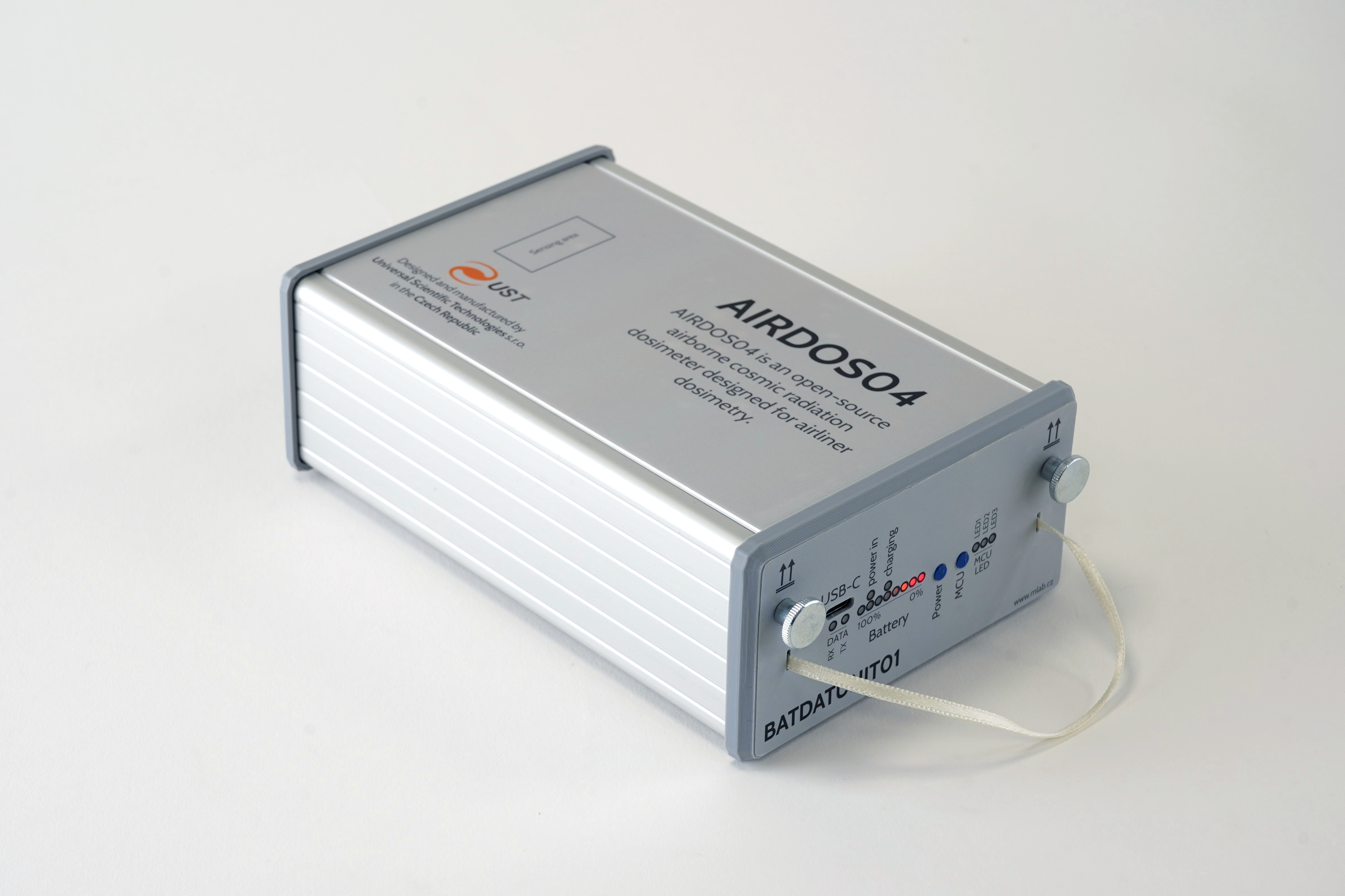
AIRDOS04 instrument. View on front user interface panel with indication LEDs.
