= Acibadem City Clinic Tokuda Hospital =

Coordinates: 42°39′54″N 23°19′29″E

- Acibadem Healthcare Holding
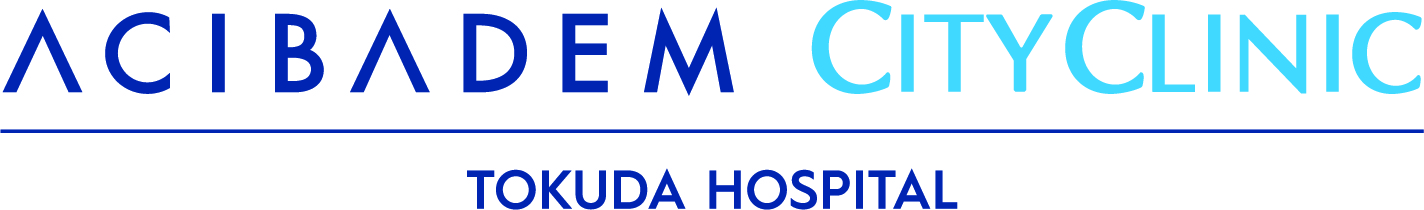

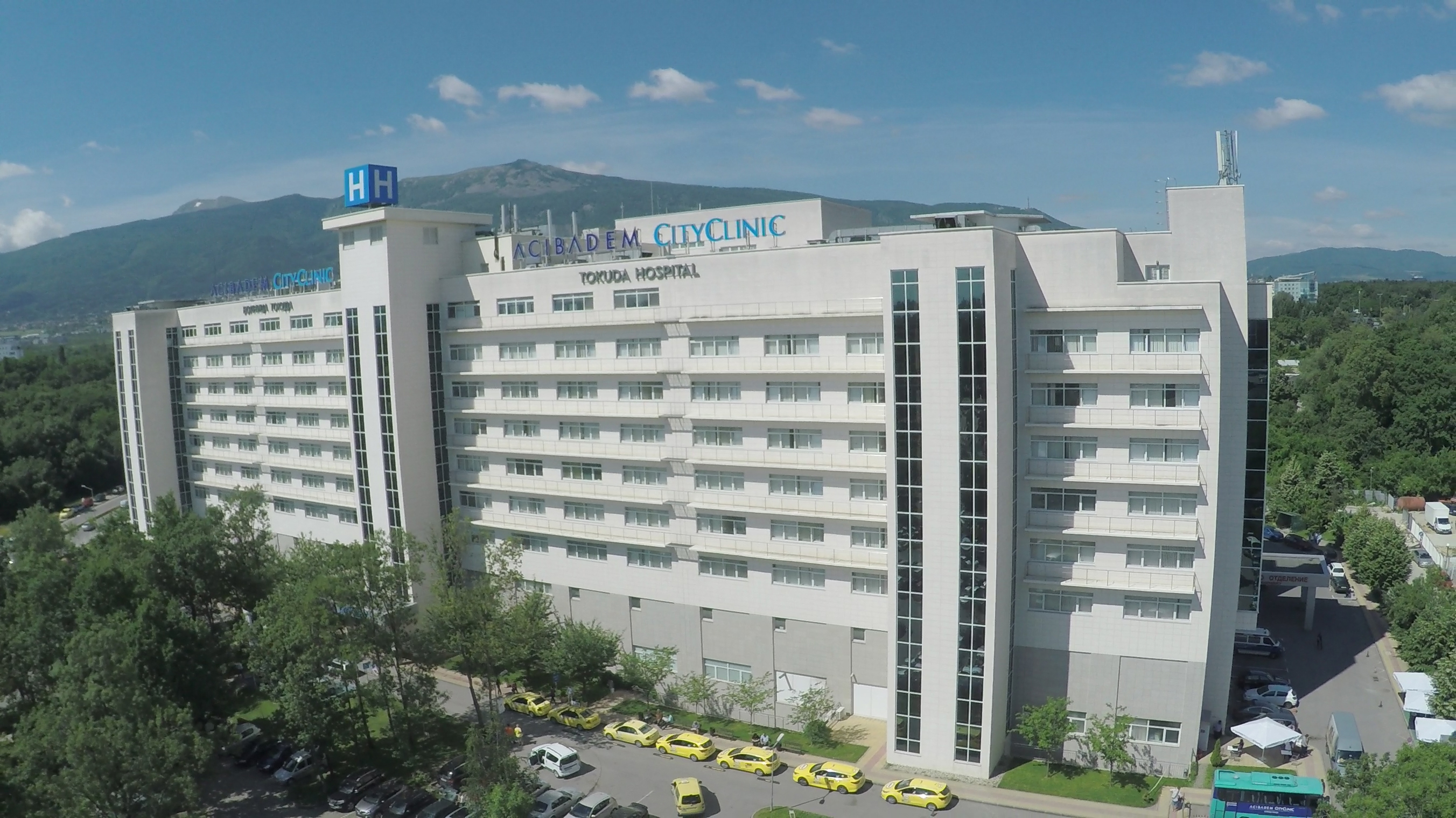
- Acibadem City Clinic Tokuda Hospital

Geography
- Location: Sofia, Bulgaria

Acibadem City Clinic Tokuda Hospital is the largest medical facility in Bulgaria, built and developed with private investments. It was opened in 2006 as part of a Japanese medical group, owned by the physician and entrepreneur Dr. Torao Tokuda. Since 2016 Tokuda Hospital is part of the largest hospital group in Bulgaria – Acibadem City Clinic.

The hospital is located in Sofia, in the southern part of Lozenets District, at 27,000 square meters (52,000 square meters floor area). It has 575 beds in 37 departments and clinics, 3 medical-diagnostic laboratories, 22 operating rooms, hospice, emergency department, clinical research center. The structure of the hospital is multi-profile and offers comprehensive health care in almost all medical specialties. The largest outpatient (diagnostic and consulting) center in Bulgaria – Acibadem City Clinic Tokuda Medical Center is also part of the hospital space.

Acibadem City Clinic Tokuda Hospital employs 1300 people, more than 350 of which are physicians and more than 600 other medical professionals. An average of 280,000 patients are served each year, over 900 children are born and nearly 13,000 operations are performed.

The hospital is accredited under the international standard for quality and safety in healthcare – JCI (Joint Commission International). Since July 2013, Tokuda Hospital has been recognized as a Scientific Organization of the Ministry of Education and Science having permission for conducting doctoral programs (PhD) and procedures for taking up academic positions. Acibadem City Clinic Tokuda Hospital has been honored with many national and international awards.

The hospital is part of the largest medical care group in Bulgaria – Acibadem City Clinic, including 4 hospitals, 5 outpatient centers, more than 2500 medical specialists, 700 of which are physicians and 750 beds. Acibadem City Clinic is part of Acibadem Healthcare Holding – one of the largest medical structures in Turkey. Globally, it is part of the Malaysia-based public company IHH Healthcare Berhad – a provider of healthcare services. IHH operates in 10 countries (including Malaysia, Singapore, Turkey, India, China, UAE, etc.), it has 52 hospitals and more than 30,000 employees.
