= Bulgaria during World War II =

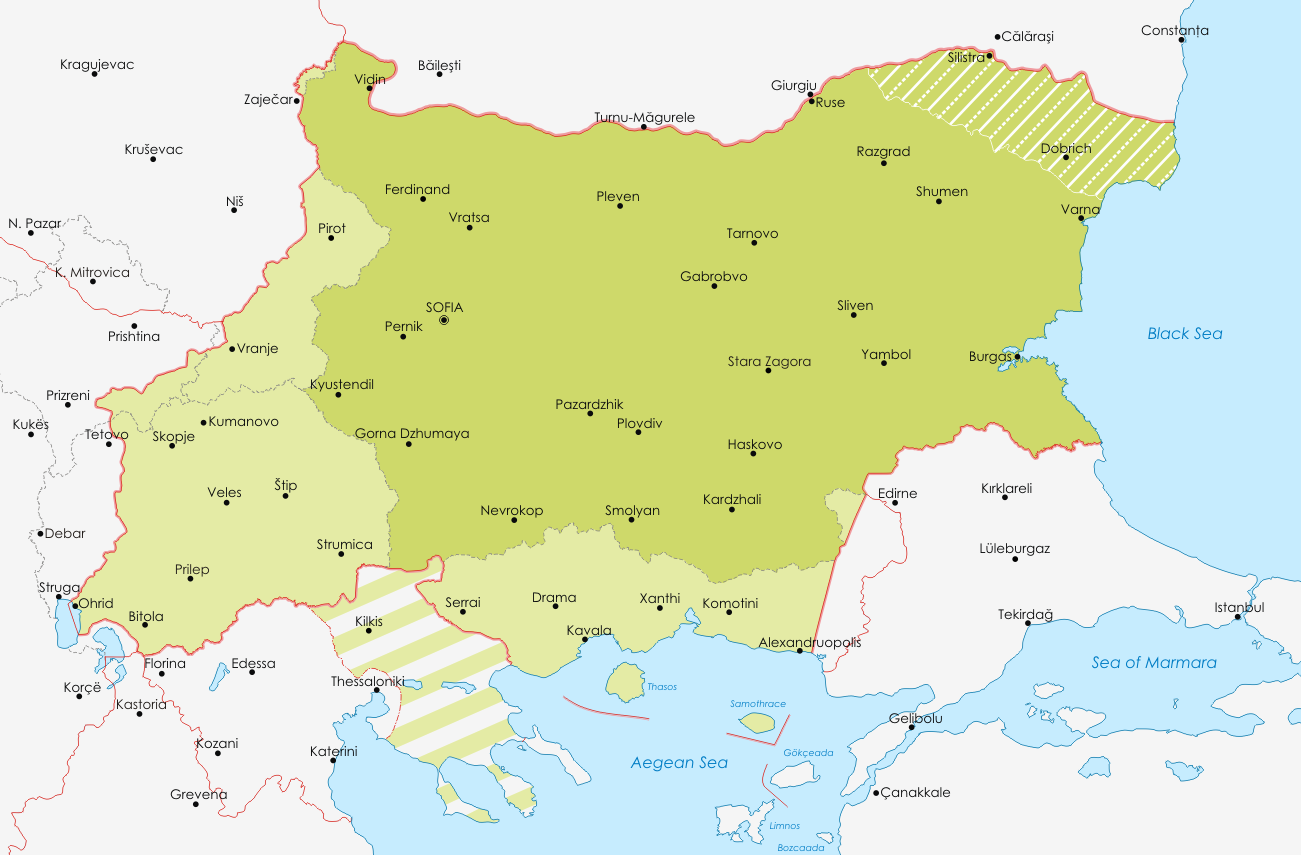
Bulgaria during World War II Post-WWII territory of Bulgaria // // Southern Dobruja, restored from Romania following the Treaty of Craiova, 1940 Vardar Macedonia, Southern Pomoravlje, Eastern Macedonia and Western Thrace annexed in 1941 // // Bulgarian military administration in Central Macedonia from 1943 Borders in 1941 Borders today

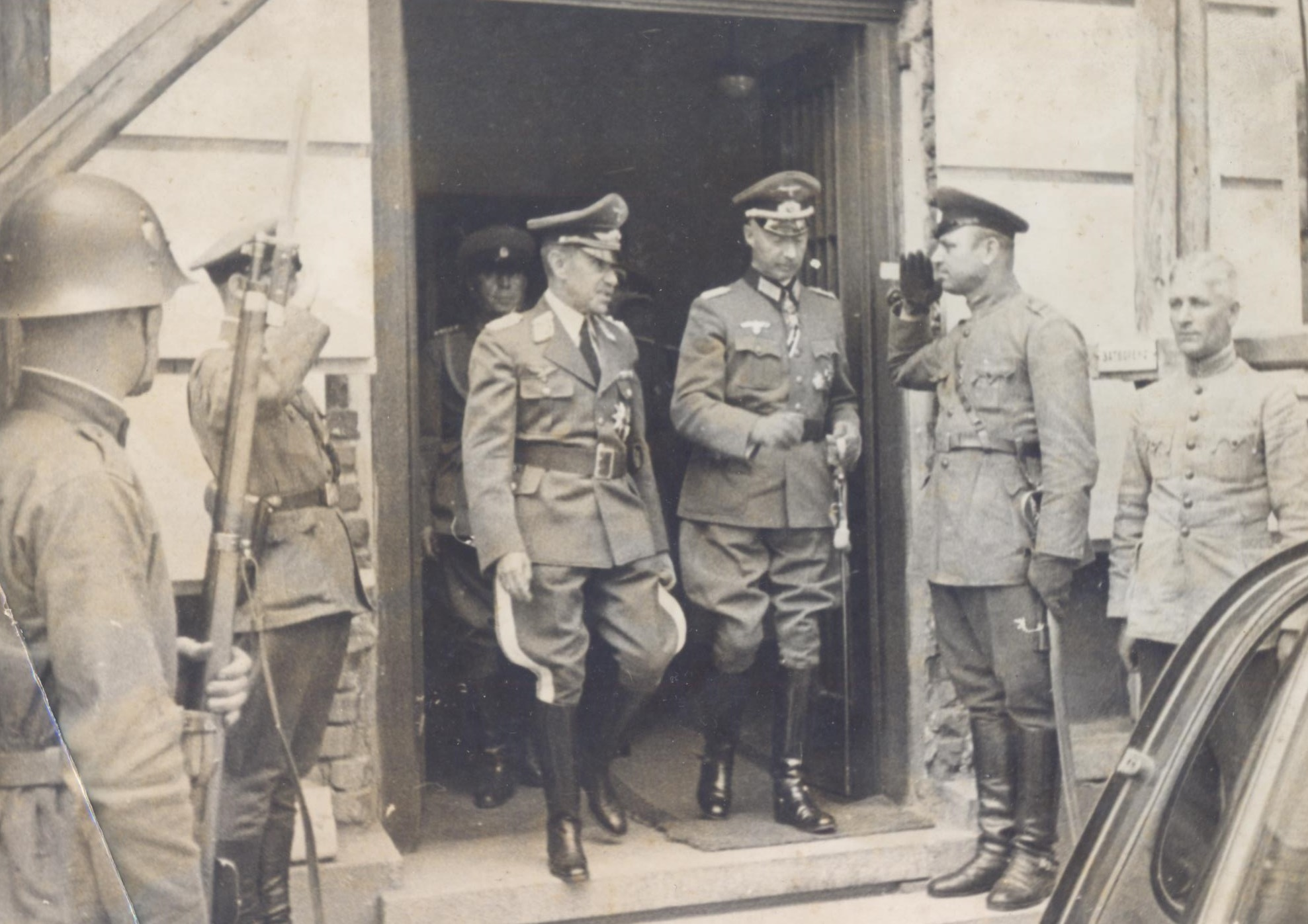
German Wehrmacht officers in Bulgaria in 1939

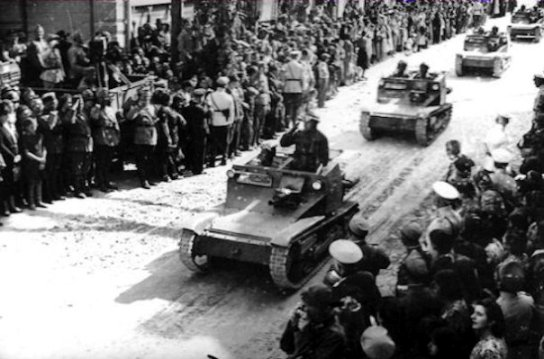
Bulgarians entering Southern Dobruja in Romania per the Treaty of Craiova (1940)

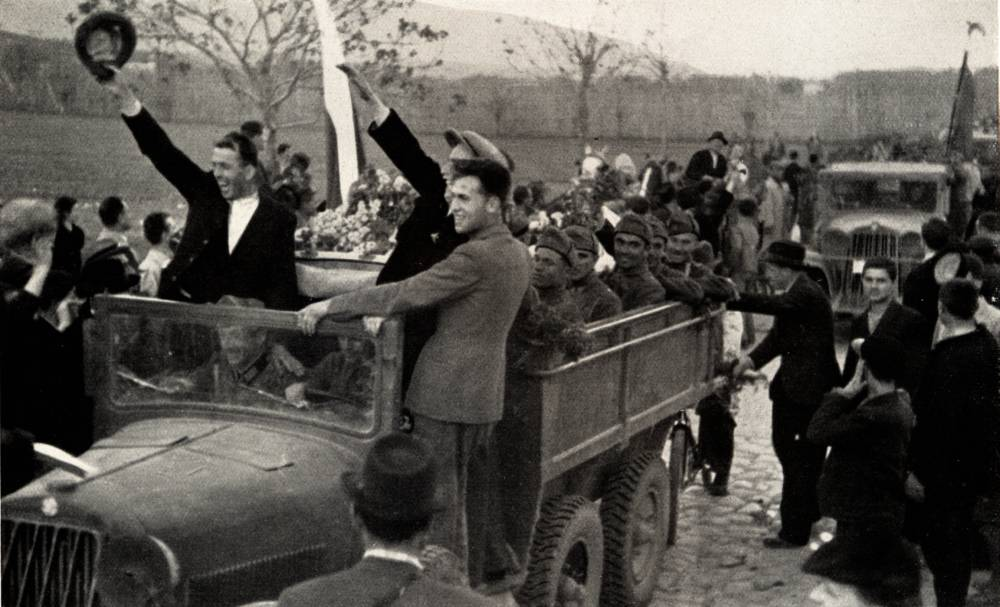
Bulgarian invasion of southern Yugoslavia (Vardar Macedonia, April 1941)

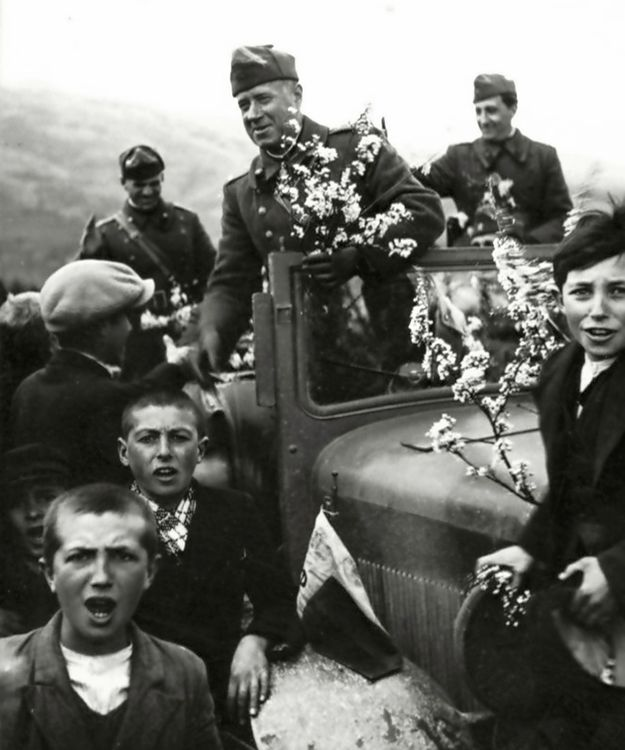
Bulgarian invasion of eastern Serbia (Western Outlands, April 1941)

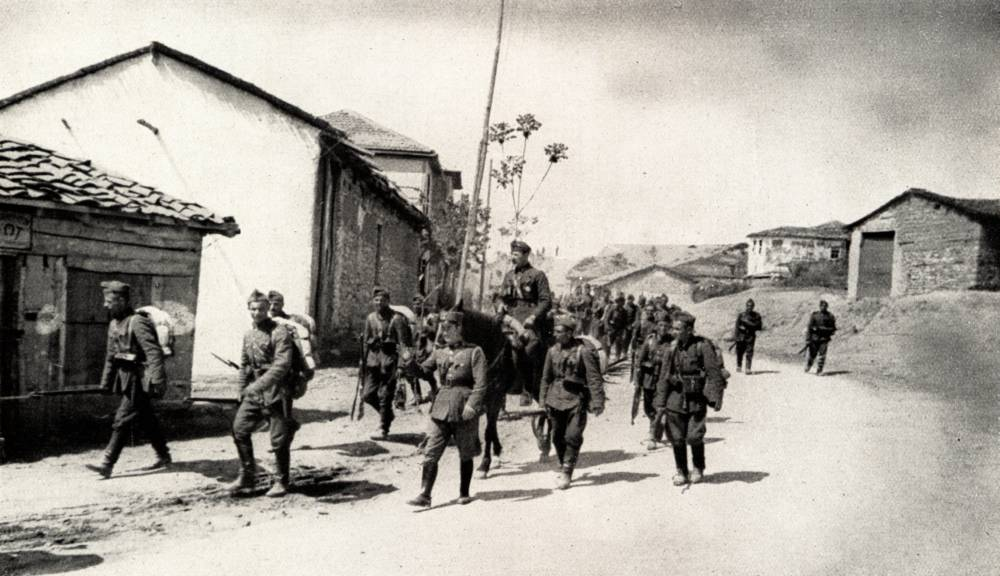
Bulgarian troops entering a village in northern Greece in April 1941

The history of Bulgaria during World War II encompasses an initial period of neutrality until 1 March 1941, a period of alliance with the Axis powers until 8 September 1944, and a period of alignment with the Allies in the final year of the war. With German consent, Bulgarian military forces occupied parts of the Kingdoms of Greece and Yugoslavia which Bulgarian irredentism claimed on the basis of the 1878 Treaty of San Stefano. Bulgaria resisted Axis pressure to join the war against the Soviet Union, which began on 22 June 1941, but did declare war on Britain and the United States on 13 December 1941. The Red Army entered Bulgaria on 8 September 1944; Bulgaria declared war on Germany the next day.

As an ally of Nazi Germany, Bulgaria participated in the Holocaust, contributing to the deaths of 11,343 Jews from the occupied territories in Greece and Yugoslavia. Though its native 48,000 Jews survived the war, they were subjected to discrimination. However, during the war, German-allied Bulgaria did not deport Jews from the core provinces of Bulgaria. Bulgaria's wartime government was pro-German under Bogdan Filov and Dobri Bozhilov, but tried to distance itself from Germany under Ivan Bagryanov. It joined the Allies under Konstantin Muraviev in early September 1944, then underwent a coup d'état a week later, and under Kimon Georgiev was pro-Soviet thereafter.

== Initial neutrality (September 1939 – 1 March 1941) ==
The government of the Kingdom of Bulgaria under Prime Minister Georgi Kyoseivanov declared a position of neutrality upon the outbreak of World War II. Bulgaria was determined to observe it until the end of the war; but it hoped for bloodless territorial gains in order to recover the territories lost in the Second Balkan War and World War I, as well as gain other lands with a significant Bulgarian population in the neighbouring countries. Bulgaria had been the only defeated power of 1918 not to have received some territorial award by 1939. However, it was clear that the central geopolitical position of Bulgaria in the Balkans would inevitably lead to strong external pressure by both World War II factions. Turkey had a non-aggression pact with Bulgaria. This recovery of territory reinforced Bulgarian hopes for resolving other territorial problems without direct involvement in the War.

Bulgaria, as a potential beneficiary from the Molotov–Ribbentrop Pact in August 1939, had competed with other such nations to curry favour with Nazi Germany by gestures of antisemitic legislation. Bulgaria was economically dependent on Germany, with 65% of Bulgaria's trade in 1939 accounted for by Germany, and militarily bound by an arms deal. Bulgarian extreme nationalists lobbied for a return to the enlarged borders of the 1878 Treaty of San Stefano. The Bulgarian officer class were mainly pro-German while the population at large was predominantly Russophile. On 7 September 1940, after the Second Vienna Award in August, Southern Dobruja, lost to Romania under the 1913 Treaty of Bucharest, was returned to Bulgarian control by the Treaty of Craiova, formulated under German pressure. A citizenship law followed on 21 November 1940, which transferred Bulgarian citizenship to the inhabitants of the annexed territory, including to around 500 Jews, alongside the territory's Roma, Greeks, Turks, and Romanians. Bulgaria had earlier briefly re-acquired Southern Dobruja between 1916 and 1918.

In October 1940 the Law for the Protection of the Nation was introduced to parliament. The bill made legislative progress through the winter of late 1940, with parliament reviewing it on the 15, 19, and 20 November. The week before the debates over the bill continued to second reading on 20 December 1940, a ship carrying 326 Bulgarian Jewish and other Jewish refugees heading to British-administered Palestine, the Salvador, was wrecked in the Sea of Marmara on 14 December with 230 lives lost. Of the 160 seats in the National Assembly, a majority of between 115 and 121 members voted with the government. The parliament ratified the bill on Christmas Eve, 1940. It received royal assent from Tsar Boris III on 15 January the following year, being published in the State Gazette on 23 January 1941. The law forbade the granting of Bulgarian citizenship to Jews as defined by the Law. The Law's second chapter ordered measures for the definition, identification, segregation, and economic and social marginalization of Jews. The law had been proposed to parliament by Petar Gabrovski, Interior Minister and former Ratnik leader in October 1940. His protégé, government lawyer and fellow Ratnik, Alexander Belev, had been sent to study the 1935 Nuremberg Laws in Germany and was closely involved in its drafting. Modelled on this precedent, the law targeted Jews, together with Freemasonry and other international organizations deemed "threatening" to Bulgarian national security.

The Law introduced restrictions on foreign Jews as well. In late 1938 and early 1939 Bulgarian police officials and the Interior Ministry were already increasingly opposed to the admittance of Jewish refugees from persecution in Central Europe. In response to a query by British diplomats in Sofia, the Foreign Ministry confirmed the policy that from April 1939, Jews from Germany, Romania, Poland, Italy, and what remained of Czechoslovakia (and later Hungary) would be required to obtain consent from the ministry to secure entry, transit, or passage visas. Nevertheless, at least 430 visas (and probably around 1,000) were issued by Bulgarian diplomats to foreign Jews, of which there were as many as 4,000 in Bulgaria in 1941. On 1 April 1941 the Police Directorate allowed the departure of 302 Jewish refugees, mostly underage, from Central Europe for the express purpose of Bulgaria "freeing itself from the foreign element". After April 1941, the Law's jurisdiction was extended beyond Bulgaria's pre-war borders to territories in Greece and Yugoslavia occupied by the Bulgarian army and claimed and administered by Bulgaria.

Bulgaria had been mooted as a possible member of the Soviet sphere in the Molotov-Ribbentrop discussions in November 1939; the significance of Bulgaria's position increased after the British Empire intervened in the Balkans campaign and Hitler's plans to invade the Soviet Union progressed. Pressure built on Boris to join the Axis, but he vacillated, and the government committed to joining – but at an unspecified date. In the planning of Operation Marita, the Germans sought to cross Bulgaria to invade Greece. Bogdan Filov travelled to Vienna to sign the Tripartite Pact at the beginning of March.

== Axis Powers (1 March 1941 – 8 September 1944) ==
After the failure of the Italian invasion of Greece, Nazi Germany demanded that Bulgaria join the Tripartite Pact and permit German forces to pass through Bulgaria to attack Greece in order to help Italy. The threat of a possible German invasion, as well as the promise of Greek and Yugoslavian territories, led the Tsar and his government to sign the Tripartite Pact on 1 March 1941. Tsar Boris III and prime minister Bogdan Filov were also both known to be fervent admirers of Adolf Hitler. German forces crossed the Danube into Bulgaria the same day. With the Soviet Union in a non-aggression pact with Germany, there was little popular opposition to the decision, and it was recognized with applause in the Parliament a couple of days later.

=== Annexation of Western Thrace, most of Macedonia and part of Pomoravlje ===
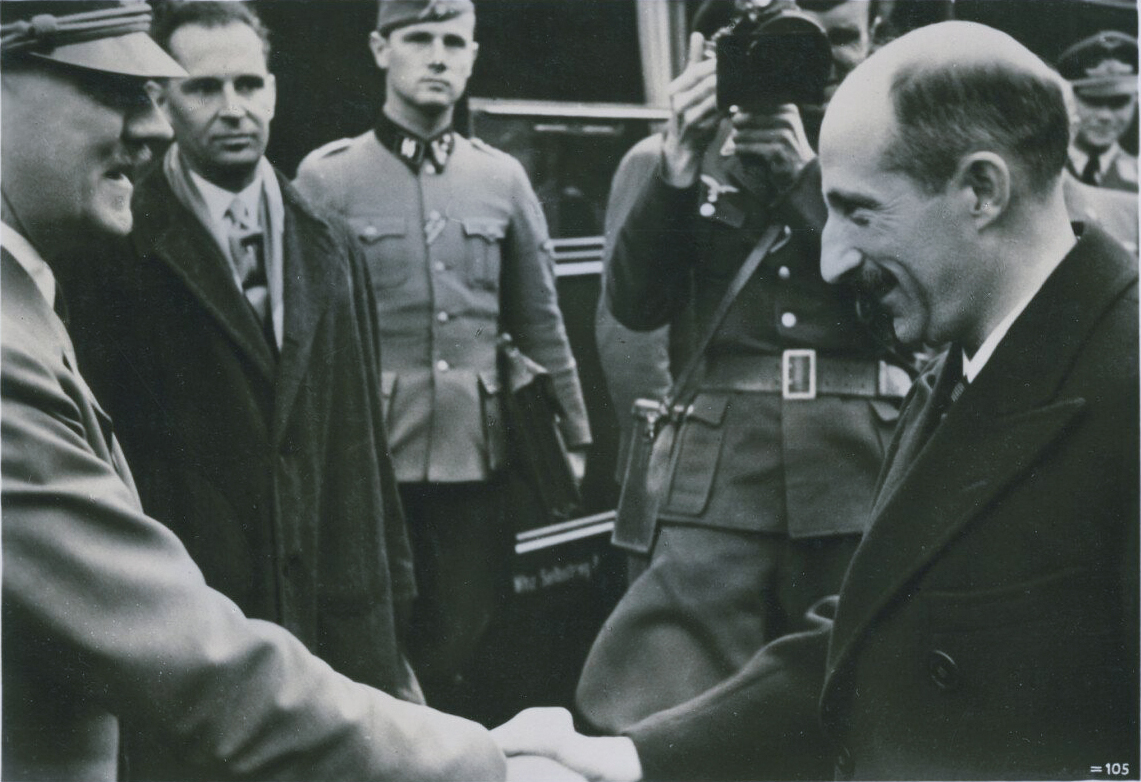
Adolf Hitler receives King Boris III of Bulgaria at his headquarters following the collapse of Yugoslavia, 25 April 1941.

On 6 April 1941, despite having joined the Axis Powers, the Bulgarian military did not participate in the invasion of Yugoslavia or the invasion of Greece, but were ready to occupy their pre-arranged territorial gains immediately after the capitulation of each country. The Yugoslav government surrendered on 17 April; on 19 April, the Bulgarian Land Forces entered Yugoslavia. The Greek government surrendered on 30 April; the Bulgarian occupation began the same day. Bulgaria's contribution to Operation Marita and the Axis conquest of Greece was relatively minor; the Bulgarians and a Wehrmacht division guarded the left flank of the invasion. After Greece and Yugoslavia's capitulation, three Bulgarian divisions from the Second and Fifth Armies deployed to Thrace and Macedonia to relieve pressure on the Germans. In words chosen by Tsar Boris, Bulgaria announced the occupation of Macedonia and Thrace "to preserve order and stability in the territories taken over by Germany". Bulgarians, elated by the de facto unification of lost national irredenta, named Boris "King Unifier".

Bulgaria occupied most of Yugoslav Macedonia, Pomoravlje, Eastern Macedonia and Western Thrace, which had already been captured by the forces of the Germans and their allies and which had been lost to Bulgaria in 1918. The Bulgarians occupied territory between the Struma River and a line of demarcation running through Alexandroupoli and Svilengrad west of the Maritsa river. Included in the area occupied were the cities of Alexandroupoli (Bulgarian: Дедеагач, romanized: Dedeagach), Komotini (Гюмюрджина, Gyumyurdzhina), Serres (Сяр, Syar), Xanthi (Ксанти), Drama (Драма) and Kavala (Кавала) and the islands of Thasos and Samothrace in Greece, as well as almost all of what is today the Republic of North Macedonia and much of souterneastern Serbia, then in Yugoslavia.

In the region of Macedonia, the majority initially welcomed union with Bulgaria as relief from Yugoslavian Serbianization, where pro-Bulgarian sentiments there still prevailed. After 1918, more than 1,700 Bulgarian churches and monasteries had been converted to Serbian or Greek Orthodoxy, and some 1,450 Bulgarian schools closed. Bulgarian had been forbidden in public life. Bulgarization was seen as necessary to strengthen Bulgaria's claim on the territory after a projected Axis victory, since Germany had not definitively indicated Bulgaria would keep it and no international treaty recognized Bulgaria's claims; "the Bulgarian nature of the territories had to be incontrovertible by the end of the war". Consequently, a university - Macedonia's first - bearing Boris III's name was instituted in Skopje, more than 800 new schools were built between 1941 and 1944, Macedonian schools were integrated into Bulgaria's education system, and Macedonian teachers were retrained in Bulgarian.

The Bulgarian Orthodox Church sought the integration of Bulgarian-ruled Macedonia with the Exarchate of Bulgaria. It was hoped the "national reunification" might lead to a restored Bulgarian Patriarchate representative of all Bulgarian communities, but Tsar Boris, wary of any new power-base in his kingdom, opposed the plan. At Easter, in Skopje Cathedral the service was officiated by a Bulgarian cleric. Priests were encouraged out of retirement to preach in Macedonian parishes. The government in Sofia preferred to appoint Bulgarian bishops loyal to the Exarchate to sees in Macedonia than local candidates, a policy which disappointed Macedonians and local Bulgarians alike. By 1944, Sofia's government was as unpopular in Macedonia as Belgrade's had been before the occupation, each government alienating Macedonians with over-centralization.

In Thrace, more opposition was encountered. Before June 1941 and the German–Turkish Treaty of Friendship, the Germans did not allow Bulgarian civilian administration for fear of antagonizing Turkey with Bulgarian expansion; separate Greek, German, and Bulgarian occupation zones prevailed until August 1941. Thereafter, pressure was applied to Turkish inhabitants of the region to emigrate. The demographics of western Thrace had been changed by the 1921 population exchange between Greece and Turkey, with the arrival of many Greeks from East Thrace in the Turkish Republic and the departure of many Turks. Most villages were assigned to the Nevrokop diocese of the Bulgarian Church as part of a wider Bulgarization policy in education and religion. The Bulgarian school system was introduced in September 1941 and by 1942's end there were 200 new primary schools and 34 gymnasia established for ethnic Bulgarians alone; Turks and Greeks had separate schools, and despite protests of Muslim teachers, children of Pomaks were sent to Bulgarian schools organized on Orthodox Christian lines. Also in September 1941, the suppression of the Drama uprising against Bulgarian rule on the night of the 28-29 September resulted in the deaths of around 1,600 people.

The Bulgarian government hoped in Thrace to remove ethnic Greeks who had arrived in territory ceded to Greece after 1918 (Treaty of Neuilly-sur-Seine), at which time Bulgarians had been the demographic plurality. Bulgarization was encouraged by a new law on internal migration and consolidation in June 1941, by a new land directorate to facilitate Bulgarian settlers set up in February 1942 with plots of land distributed to officials, and by incentives for ethnic Bulgarians from southern Macedonia to move to replace departing Greeks in Thrace. There was also a bias towards Bulgarians in the cooperative bank established to assist farmers there. By March 1942, resettlement permits issued to Bulgarians in Thrace numbered 18,925. After 1942, Allied victories and Greek and Turkish threats of reprisals caused a decrease in the rates of Bulgarians emigrating to Thrace. Because food was brought in from metropolitan Bulgaria, Bulgarian-occupied western Thrace was spared the great famine that affected German and Italian occupation zones in Greece, even though Thrace was less developed than either Bulgaria or the rest of Greece.

Although Bulgarian citizenship had been granted jus soli to residents of newly annexed South Dobruja, the Law for the Protection of the Nation forbade granting of citizenship to Jews in the subsequently occupied territories, and no action was taken to determine the status of any of the inhabitants at all until 1942. Jews were merely issued with identity cards in a different colour to non-Jews'. A decree-law issued on 10 June 1942 (Nerada za podantstvo v osvobodenite prez 1941 godina zemi) confirmed that the "liberated" territories' Jewish residents were ineligible for Bulgarian citizenship. This effectively made them stateless.

=== Occupation of most of Serbia ===
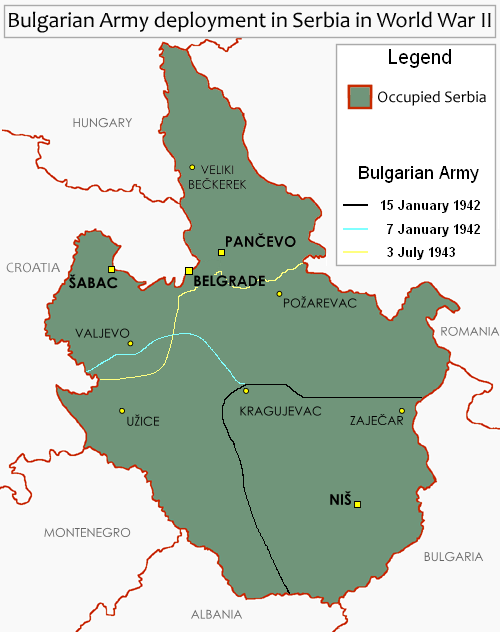
Bulgarian Army deployments in occupied Serbia during World War II

In Nedic's Serbia to secure the railroads, highways and other infrastructure, the Germans began to make use of Bulgarian occupation troops in large areas of the occupied territory, although these troops were under German command and control. This occurred in three phases, with the Bulgarian 1st Occupation Corps consisting of three divisions moving into the occupied territory on 31 December 1941. This corps was initially responsible for about 40% of the territory (excluding the Banat), bounded by the Ibar river in the west between Kosovska Mitrovica and Kraljevo, the West Morava river between Kraljevo and Čačak, and then a line running roughly east from Čačak through Kragujevac to the border with Bulgaria. They were therefore responsible for large sections of the Belgrade–Niš–Sofia and Niš–Skopje railway lines, as well as the main Belgrade–Niš–Skopje highway.

In January 1943, the Bulgarian area was expanded westwards to include all areas west of the Ibar river and south of a line running roughly west from Čačak to the border with occupied Montenegro and the NDH. This released the 7th SS Volunteer Mountain Division Prinz Eugen, which had been garrisoning this area over the winter, to deploy into the NDH and take part in Case White against the Partisans. Many members of the Volksdeutsche from Serbia and the Banat were serving in the 7th SS Volunteer Mountain Division Prinz Eugen. This division was responsible for war crimes committed against the peoples of Bosnia and Herzegovina.

In July 1943, the Bulgarian occupation zone expanded northwards, with a fourth division, the 25th Division taking over from the 297th Infantry Division in the rest of the territory (excluding the Banat) that did not share a border with the NDH. From this point, German forces only directly occupied the immediate area of Belgrade, the northwest region of the territory that shared a border with the NDH, and the Banat.

=== International situation ===
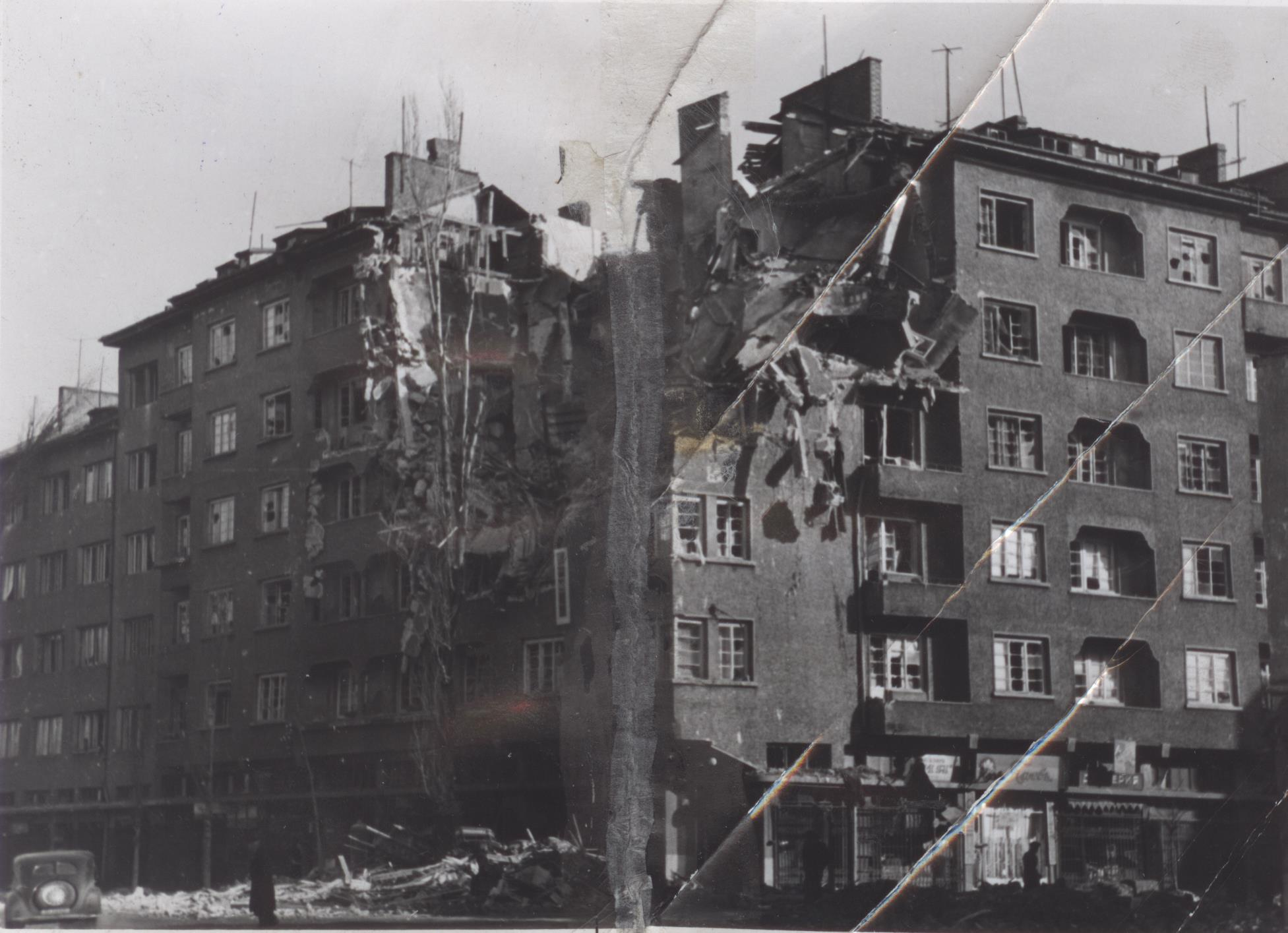
Damage in Sofia from an Allied air raid in 1944

Bulgaria did not join the German invasion of the Soviet Union that began on 22 June 1941 nor did it declare war on the Soviet Union. Bulgarian propaganda refrained from criticism of Stalin. The personal secretary to Tsar Boris noted that the country's strategy was to "conciliate Germany by making many comparatively unimportant concessions". Tsar Boris's position was that the Bulgarian army was not equipped properly or modernised sufficiently to face the Red Army, with conscript soldiers who would not fight effectively far from home against Bulgaria's former Russian allies. Moreover, Bulgaria's military was positioned to thwart any potential threat to the Axis from Turkey or an Allied landing in Greece. Boris resisted German pressure to allow Bulgarian soldiers or volunteers to join the fight against the Soviets. Involvement by the navy was limited to escorting Axis convoys in the Black Sea. However, despite the lack of official declarations of war by both sides, the Bulgarian Navy was involved in a number of skirmishes with the Soviet Black Sea Fleet, which attacked Bulgarian shipping. Besides this, Bulgarian armed forces garrisoned in the Balkans battled various anti-Axis resistance groups and partisan movements. Additionally, in 1941 and 1942 the Bulgarian government sent multiple delegations of high-ranking officers that traveled to the occupied USSR; an instrumental role in this action was played by the Chief of the General Staff of the Bulgarian Army, Lieutenant-General Konstantin Ludvig Lukash, who had kept a diary during the most important trip of November-December 1941. Although essentially symbolic gestures, these trips by senior officers provided a channel for intelligence but most importantly demonstrated Bulgaria's "investment" in Hitler and the Axis.

On 5 March 1941, after the start of Operation Marita, Britain severed diplomatic relations with Bulgaria and in April the RAF carried out bombing raids on Bulgarian soil, however neither side declared war at this time. Under pressure to show support for the Axis, the Bulgarian government passed a resolution declaring war on the United Kingdom and the United States on 13 December 1941 (two days after Germany and Italy had declared war against the United States); though described as a purely symbolic or "token" act (as Bulgaria did not simultaneously deploy its forces against any allied targets), the decision resulted in the bombing of Sofia and other Bulgarian cities by Allied aircraft from late 1943. The Bulgarian military was able to destroy some Allied aircraft passing through Bulgarian airspace to attack Romania's oilfields. The first were on the return flight of Operation Tidal Wave air raid on Ploiești on 1 August 1943, part of the oil campaign; bombers flying back to airbases in North Africa over Bulgaria were intercepted by fighters of the Bulgarian Air Force and aircrew that reached the ground alive were interned as prisoners of war under the 1929 Geneva Convention. Most POWs were from the United States Army Air Forces and the Royal Air Force, with smaller numbers of Canadian, Australian, Dutch, Greek, and Yugoslav airmen also interned at a prisoner-of-war camp opened on 25 November 1943 under the control of the Bulgarian Army's garrison at Shumen and commended by an officer of lieutenant rank. Downed aircrew were usually captured and imprisoned locally, interrogated in the prison in Sofia, and then moved to the POW camp at Shumen; one American airman was liberated from a local jail by Communist partisans, with whom he thereafter evaded capture. Allied POWs were ultimately interned at Shumen for ten months. The few Soviet POWs were interned at a camp at Sveti Kiri, together with over a hundred Soviet citizens resident in Bulgaria, under the authority of the State Security section of the Police Directorate (DPODS).

When Germany invaded the USSR in June 1941 (Operation Barbarossa), the underground Bulgarian Communist Party launched a guerrilla movement, which was repressed severely by the government. After Barbarossa failed to defeat the USSR, and the US joined the Allies, it seemed that the Axis might lose the war. In August 1942, the Communist Party, the Zveno movement, and some other groups formed the Fatherland Front to resist the pro-German government. Partisan detachments were particularly active in the mountain areas of western and southern Bulgaria.

Two weeks after a visit to Germany in August 1943, Bulgarian Tsar Boris III died suddenly on 28 August aged 49. There was speculation that he was poisoned – a recent meeting with Hitler had not been cordial – but no culprit was found. A motive for an assassination is difficult to establish: it would have been a great risk for Germans, Soviets, and British; it was uncertain who might replace Boris at the centre of the Bulgarian state. A post-mortem in the 1990s established that an infarction in the left side of the heart was the direct cause of death. According to the diary of the German attache in Sofia at the time, Colonel Carl-August von Schoenebeck, the two German physicians who attended to the tsar – Sajitz and Hans Eppinger – both believed that Boris died from the same poison Dr. Eppinger had allegedly found two years earlier in the postmortem examination of the Greek prime minister Ioannis Metaxas. His six-year-old son Simeon II succeeded to the throne. Because of Simeon's age, a regency council was set up, headed by Prime Minister Bogdan Filov, who gave up that office on 9 September. The new Prime Minister from 14 September 1943, Dobri Bozhilov, was in most respects as pro-German. Boris had begun to seek Bulgaria's escape from war, and the regency, which lacked his authority abroad and at home, made similar designs. Bozhilov intensified negotiations with the western Allies, fearing the fate of Benito Mussolini's government.

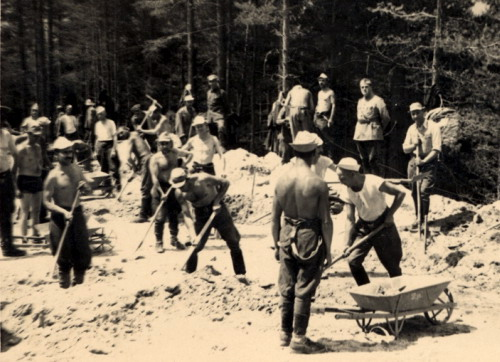
Members of a Jewish forced labour battalion working in Bulgaria in 1941

On 19 November 1943 the first heavy bombing of Bulgarian cities by the Allies took place. After further raids and an even heavier attack on Sofia on 30 March 1944, many inhabitants fled the city. Major Frank Thompson of the Special Operations Executive was parachuted in to rendezvous with the Bulgarian Resistance, but was captured and executed for espionage in June 1944.

After April 1944, the Soviets increased pressure on Bulgaria to abandon the Axis alliance. Bulgaria had maintained diplomatic relations with the Soviet Union while being a member of the Axis Powers.

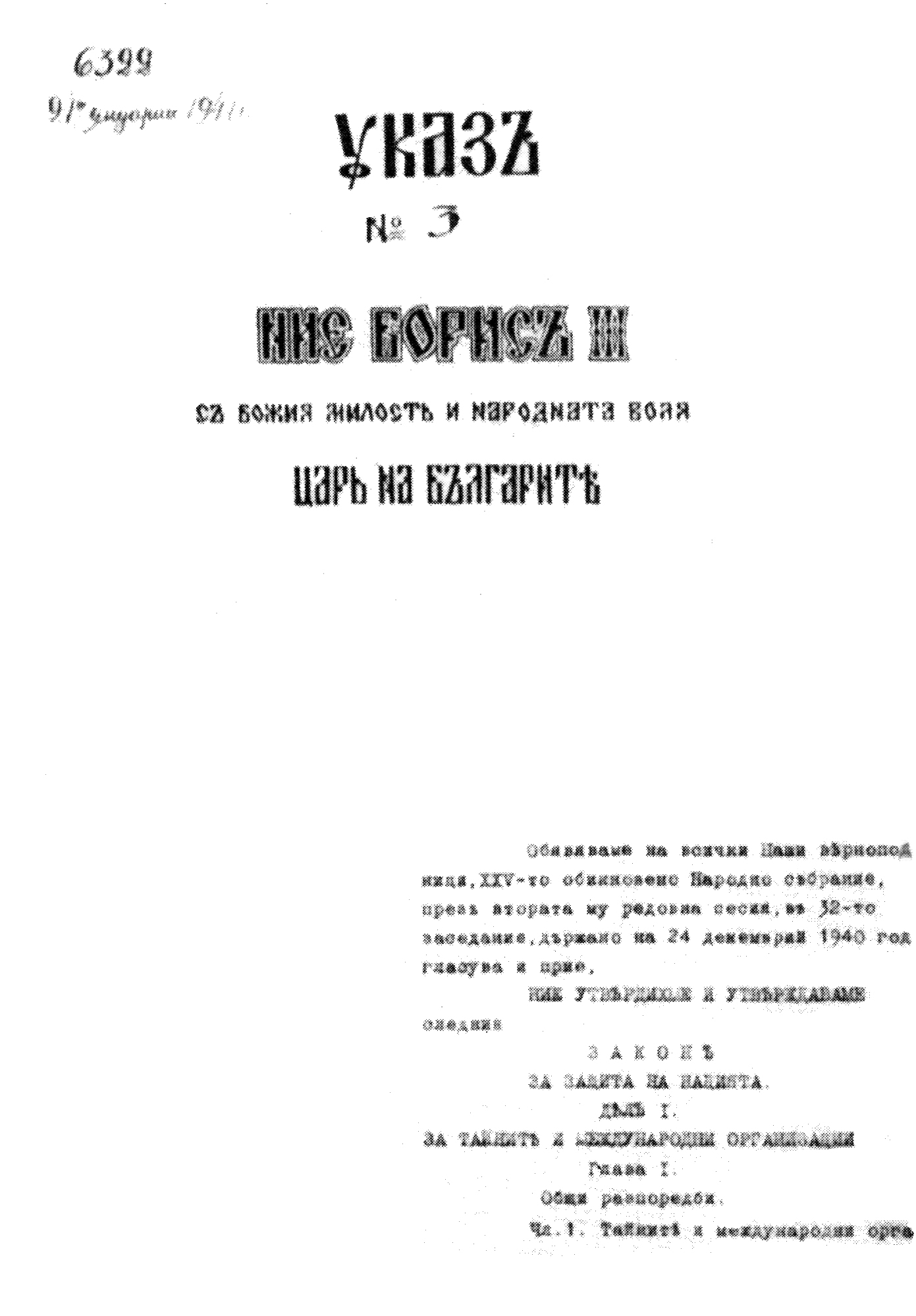
Bulgaria's antisemitic "Law for the Protection of the Nation", based on the German race laws

On 1 June 1944 Filov sacked Bozhilov, in the hope of placating internal opposition and the Allies. Filov had reluctantly decided the alliance with Germany should end. Ivan Bagryanov took over as prime minister. Filov tried to play for time, hoping that an Allied landing in the Balkans would allow Bulgaria to join the Allies without the loss of the new territories in Thrace and Macedonia, and avoid the German occupation of Bulgaria that would follow an immediate change in sides. But the invasion of Normandy on 6 June ended any possibility of a major western Allied offensive in the Balkans. Meanwhile, Soviet westward offensives continued apace. Also at this time, German forces were being withdrawn from Greece, and Bulgaria had lost its strategic significance to the western Allies.

Bagryanov had sympathies for the West, and hoped to disengage Bulgaria from the war before Soviet forces reached the Danube, thus avoiding Soviet occupation. By the middle of August, American diplomatic pressure and a report of the International Committee of the Red Cross which had detailed hardships of the inmates had caused conditions at the POW camp at Shumen to be improved; before this, the Allied POWs were allowed only limited water and suffered from malnutrition. Bagryanov repealed the antisemitic legislation of his predecessors on 17 August. He had success in negotiating the withdrawal of the German forces from Varna on the grounds that their presence invited an Allied attack, and blocked the arrival of any more German troops in Bulgaria.

But his plans went awry. On 20 August 1944, Soviet forces broke through Axis defenses in Romania, and approached the Balkans and Bulgaria. On 23 August, Romania left the Axis Powers and declared war on Germany, and allowed Soviet forces to cross its territory to reach Bulgaria. On 27 August, the Bulgarian government announced neutrality; Bagryanov handed over to the Germans 8,000 railway wagons to accelerate their withdrawal. The Fatherland Front, which had demanded full neutrality, decried this assistance. On the same date the Fatherland Front made the decision to incite an armed rebellion against the government.

On 30 August, Joseph Stalin declared the USSR would no longer recognize Bulgarian neutrality. Soviet pressure for Bulgaria to declare war on Germany was intense. Bagryanov assured the Soviets that foreign troops in Bulgaria would be disarmed, ordered German troops to leave the country, and began to disarm German soldiers arriving in Dobruja, but refused to violate Bulgaria's own newly-declared neutrality by declaring war on Germany. But this was not enough. On 2 September, Bagryanov and his government were replaced by a government of Konstantin Muraviev and those opposition parties which were not in the Fatherland Front. Muraviev initially opposed war with Germany, arguing this would be used as pretext for a Soviet occupation of Bulgaria. Support for the government was withheld by the Fatherland Front, which described it as pro-Nazis attempting to hold on to power. On 4 September, the Fatherland Front organized popular strikes. On 5 September, Muraviev decided to break off diplomatic relations with Germany, but delayed announcing the move for two days at the urging of War Minister Lieut. Gen. Ivan Marinov to enable Bulgarian troops to withdraw from occupied Macedonia. When all German troops had left the country on the afternoon of 7 September, Bulgaria declared war on Germany, but earlier on the same day the Soviet Union declared war on Bulgaria, without consultation with either the USA or Britain, "to liberate Bulgaria". On 8 September Bulgaria was simultaneously at war with four major belligerents of the war: Germany, Britain, the USA, and the USSR. Soviet forces crossed the border on 8 September. They occupied the north-eastern part of Bulgaria along with the key port cities of Varna and Burgas by the next day. By order of the government, the Bulgarian Army offered no resistance .

== Holocaust ==
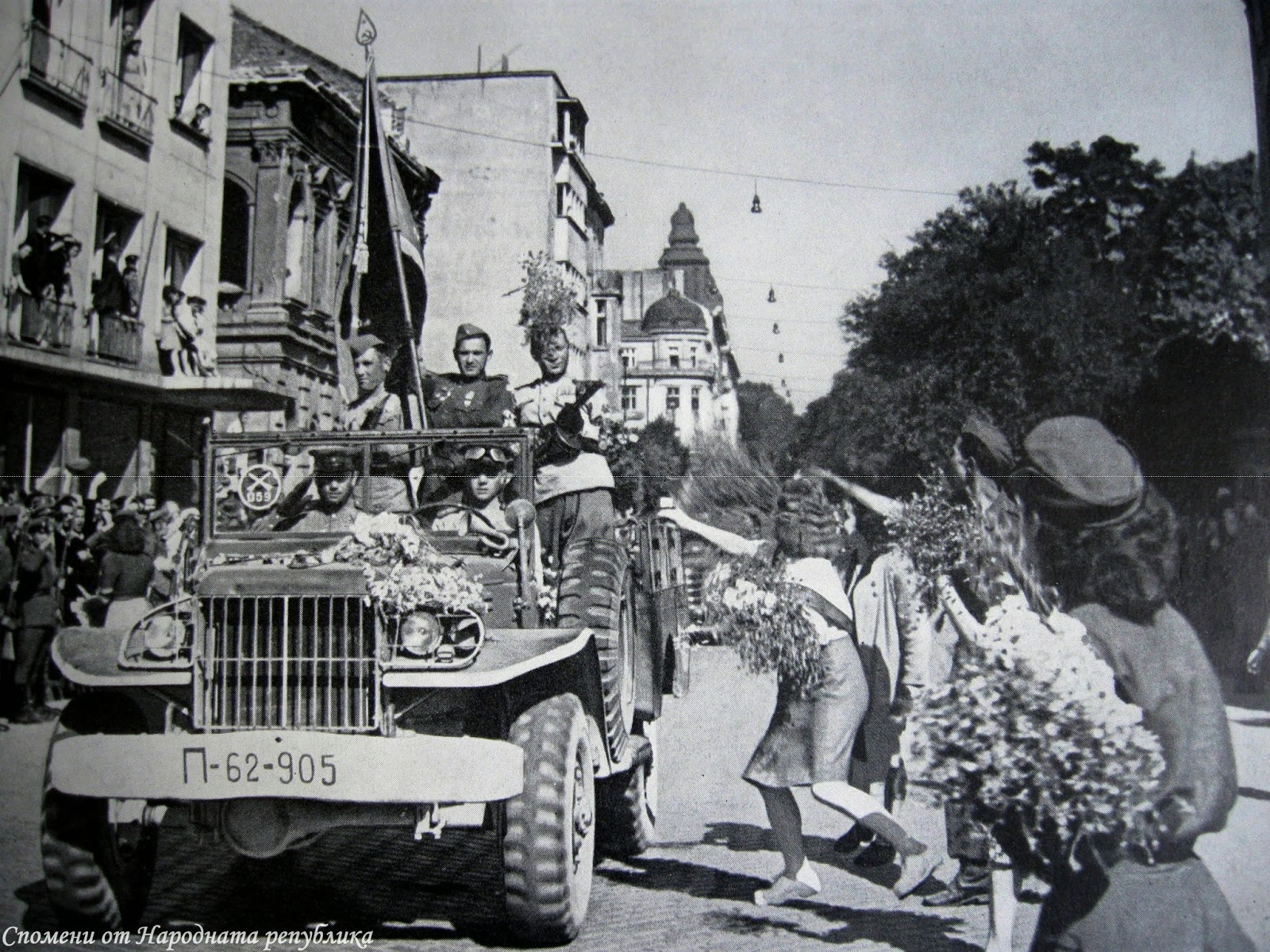
Soviet troops in Sofia, Bulgaria, in September 1944

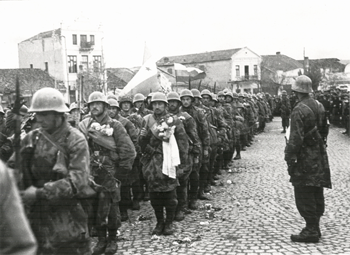
Bulgarian paratroopers entering Kumanovo in Macedonia in November 1944

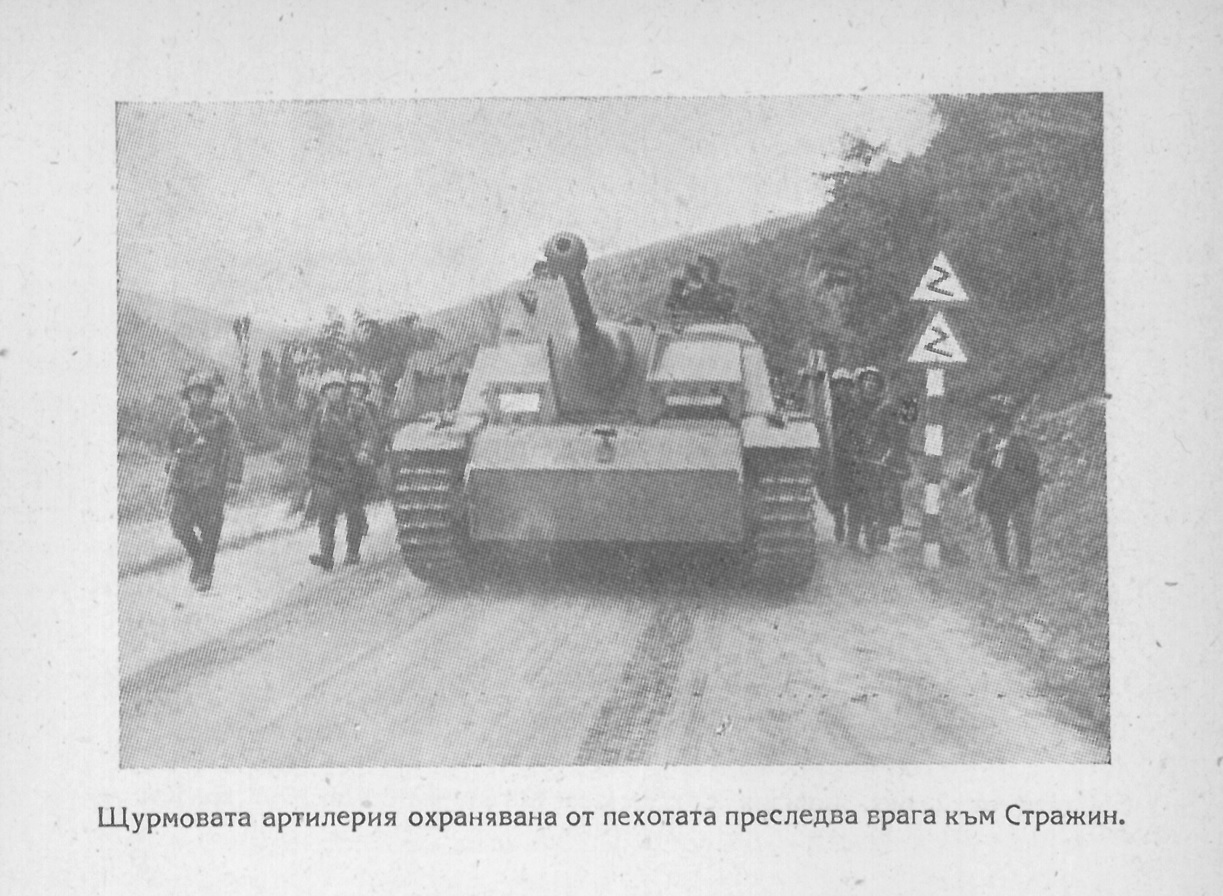
Bulgarian StuG III and supporting infantry advancing toward the ridge of Strazhin in Macedonia in October 1944

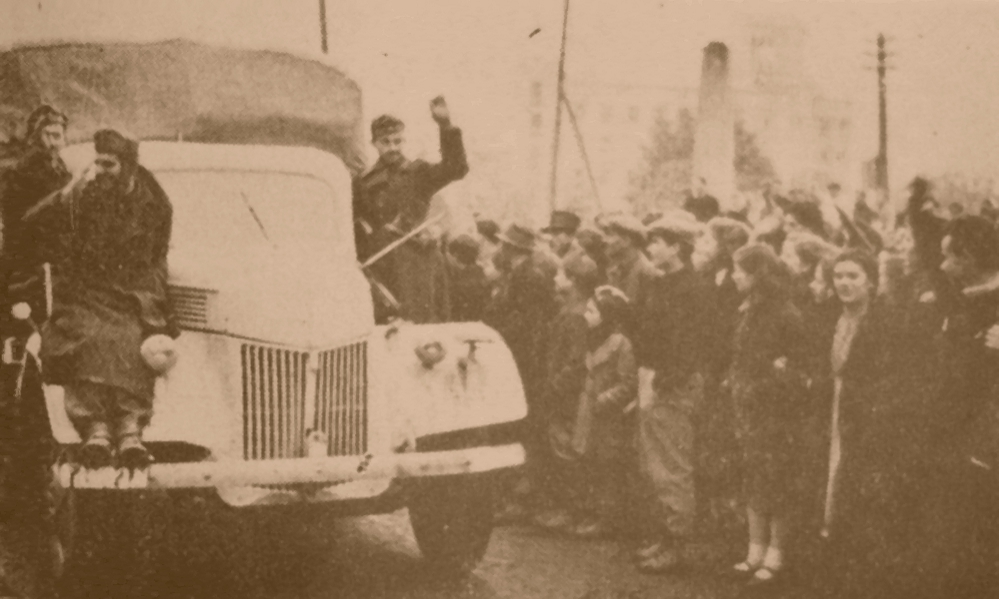
Bulgarian soldiers greeted in Skopje on November 14, 1944

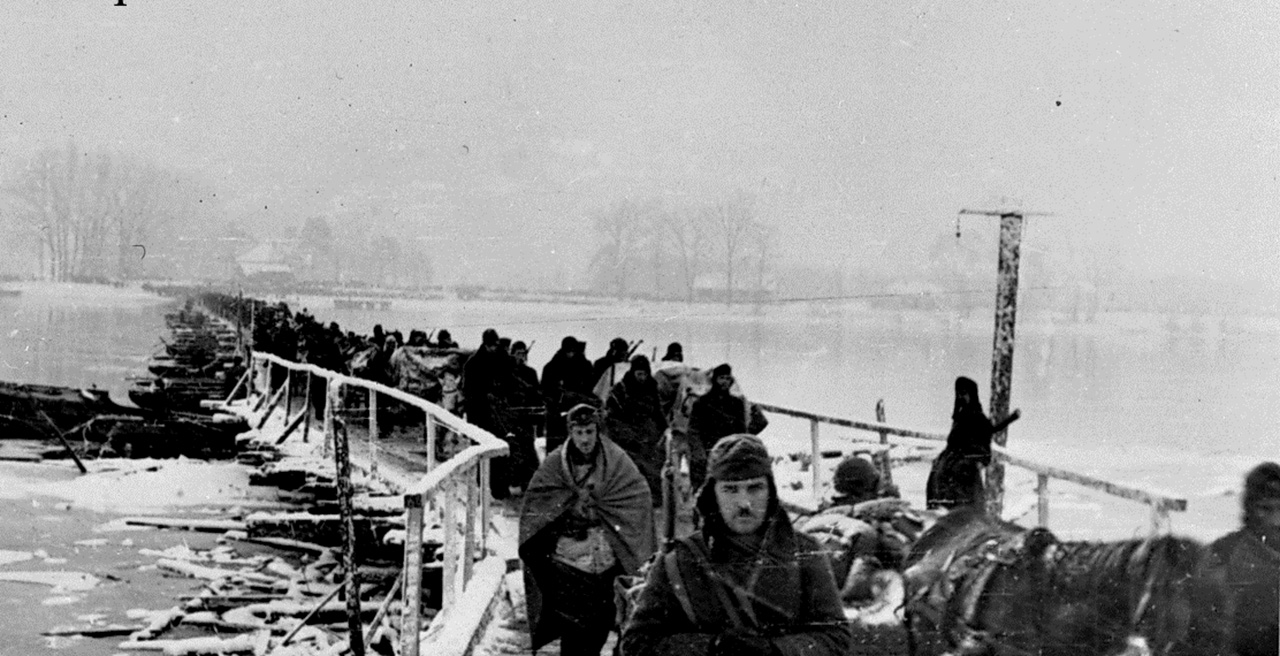
Bulgarian troops passing the Danube near Bezdán in Vojvodina in January 1945

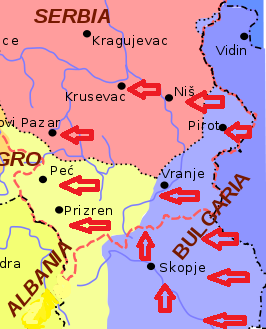
Map of the offensive of the Bulgarian troops in Yugoslavia in the autumn of 1944 (October–November)

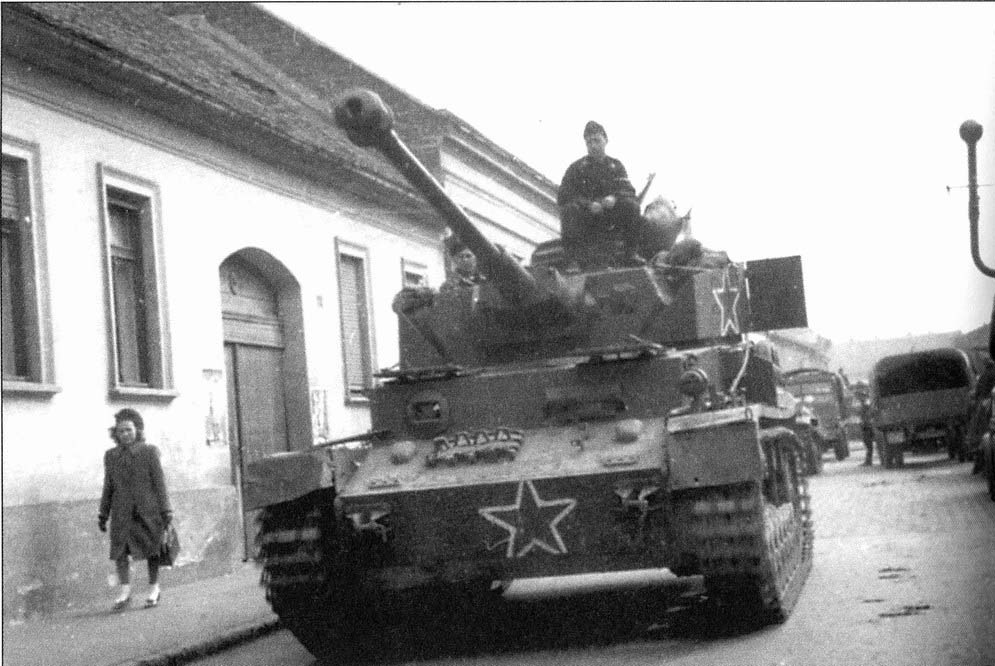
A German-made Panzer IV tank of the Bulgarian Army in Hungary in March 1945. The Soviet style star markings are meant to prevent confusion with an actual German Panzer IV.

During Bulgaria's alliance with Nazi Germany, the Bulgarian government introduced measures and legislation targeting Jews and other minorities; in September 1939 all Jews regarded as foreign nationals – some 4,000 – were expelled. Most fled eventually to Palestine, arriving there after considerable difficulty. Interior Minister Petar Gabrovski, and Alexander Belev, having studied the Nuremberg Laws, introduced in 1940 the Law for Protection of the Nation, in force from January 1941. By this means, Jews under Bulgaria's control were excluded from most professions, universities, and trades unions, from all government service, and from certain public areas. Moreover, Jews were required to carry special identity cards, were forbidden to bear "non-Jewish" names or marry Bulgarians.

The Bulgarian irredentist seizure in 1941 of coveted territory from Greece and Yugoslavia and the formation of the new oblasts of Skopje, Bitola, and Belomora increased Bulgaria's Jewish population to around 60,000. These were forbidden to have Bulgarian citizenship under the Law for the Protection of the Nation. From early in the war, Bulgarian occupation authorities in Greece and Yugoslavia handed over Jewish refugees fleeing from Axis Europe to the Gestapo. In October 1941 Bulgarian authorities demanded the registration of 213 Serbian Jews detected by the Gestapo in Bulgarian-administered Skopje; they were arrested on 24 November and 47 of these were taken to Banjica concentration camp in Belgrade, Serbia and killed on 3 December 1941.

The Law for the Protection of the Nation was followed by a decree-law (naredbi) on 26 August 1942, which tightened restrictions on Jews, widened the definition of Jewishness, and increased the burdens of proof required to prove non-Jewish status and exemptions (privilegii). Jews were thereafter required to wear yellow stars, excepting only those baptized who practised the Christian eucharist. Bulgarian Jews married to non-Jews by Christian rite before 1 September 1940 and baptized before the 23 January 1941 enforcement of the Law for the Protection of the Nation, rescinding the exemptions allowed to such cases allowed by the Law. Exemptions for war orphans, war widows, and the disabled veterans were henceforth applicable only "in the event of competition with other Jews", and all such privilegii could be revoked or denied if the individual were convicted of a crime or deemed "anti-government" or "communist". In February 1943 SS-Hauptsturmführer Theodor Dannecker and Belev - appointed by Gabrovski in 1942 to head the new "Office of the Commissar of Jewish Affairs" within the interior ministry - signed the Dannecker-Belev Agreement, in which Bulgaria agreed to supply Germany with 20,000 Jewish captives. Bulgaria is the only nation to have signed an agreement with Germany to supply Jews in this way; Bulgaria agreed to meet the cost of their expulsion and the document explicitly noted that Bulgaria, knowing their fate in German hands, would never request the Jews' repatriation.

The Law for the Protection of the Nation stipulated that Jews fulfil their compulsory military service in the labour battalions and not the regular army. Forced labour battalions were instituted in Bulgaria in 1920 as a way of circumventing the Treaty of Neuilly-sur-Seine, which limited the size of the Bulgarian military and ended conscription into the regular military. The forced labour service (trudova povinnost) set up by the government of Aleksandar Stamboliyski supplied cheap labour for government projects and employment for demobilised soldiers from the First World War. In the first decade of its existence, more than 150,000 Bulgarian subjects, "primarily minorities (particularly Muslims) and other poor segments of society" had been drafted to serve. In the 1930s, in the lead-up to the Second World War, the trudova povinnost were militarised: attached to the War Ministry in 1934, they were given military ranks in 1936. After the start of war, in 1940 "labour soldiers" (trudovi vojski) were established as a separate corps "used to enforce anti-Jewish policies during World War Two" as part of an overall "deprivation" plan.

In August 1941, at the request of Adolf-Heinz Beckerle - German Minister Plenipotentiary at Sofia - the War Ministry relinquished control of all Jewish forced labour to the Ministry of Buildings, Roads, and Public Works. Mandatory conscription applied from August 1941: initially men 20-44 were drafted, with the age limit rising to 45 in July 1942 and 50 a year later. Bulgarians replaced Jews in the commands of the Jewish labour units, which were no longer entitled to uniforms. On 29 January 1942, new all-Jewish forced labour battalions were announced; their number was doubled to twenty-four by the end of 1942. Jewish units were separated from the other ethnicities - three quarters of the forced labour battalions were from minorities: Turks, Russians, and residents of the territories occupied by Bulgaria - the rest were drawn from the Bulgarian unemployed. The Jews in forced labour were faced with discriminatory policies which became stricter as time went on; with increasing length of service and decreasing the allowance of food, rest, and days off. On 14 July 1942 a disciplinary unit was established to impose new punitive strictures: deprivation of mattresses or hot food, a "bread-and-water diet", and the barring of visitors for months at time. As the war progressed, and round-ups of Jews began in 1943, Jews made more numerous efforts to escape and punishments became increasingly harsh.

In March 1943 Bulgarian troops and military police rounded up the Jews in Bulgarian-occupied Greek Macedonia and Vardar Macedonia in Yugoslavia - 7,122 from Macedonia and 4,221 from Thrace, and sent them via transit concentration camps to the Bulgarian Danube port of Lom, where they were embarked and taken upriver to Vienna and thence to Treblinka; nearly all were killed. This was arranged by request of the German foreign ministry in spring 1942 to surrender all Jews under Bulgarian control to German custody, to which the Bulgarian government acceded, creating the "Jewish Affairs" commissariat under Belev to organize the genocide called for at the Wannsee Conference. By March 1943 Jewish Bulgarians were being concentrated at schools and train stations by the Bulgarian authorities within the country's pre-war borders. Subsequently, in spring 1943, protests led by parliamentarian Dimitar Peshev M.P. and the Bulgarian Orthodox Church, concerned over the welfare of Jewish converts to Christianity as well as of a "national minority" generally, succeeded in first delaying, and then in May in finally preventing Belev's plan to meet the 20,000 figure by deporting some 8,000 Bulgarian Jews from Sofia, Kyustendil, and elsewhere to Nazi extermination camps in Poland, including all southwest Bulgaria's Jews; they were instead dispossessed of all their property, deported to the provinces, and the men aged 20–40 conscripted into forced labour, as were Jews from Stara Zagora and Kazanlak. On 21 May 1943 the Council of Ministers voted that Jews were to be expelled from Sofia to the countryside in three days' time. Belev ordered the expulsion on 24 May of Jews from the capital: 19,000 Sofia Jews were deported to specific rural areas and towns. Special trains were arranged and the Jews were assigned specific departures, separating family members. A maximum of 30 kg of property per person was allowed; the rest they were forced leave behind, to sell at "abusively low" prices, or which was otherwise pilfered or stolen. Bulgarian officials and neighbours benefited from the proceeds.

In April 1943 Joachim von Ribbentrop enquired of King Boris why more Jews had not been sent for extermination by Bulgaria; the response came that Boris would deport "only a small number of Bolshevik-communist elements from Old Bulgaria [Bulgaria's pre-1941 borders] because he needed the rest of the Jews for road construction." In May 1943, Bulgaria imprisoned prominent Jewish leaders in the Somivit concentration camp, later that month and the following month more than 20,000 Jews were deported from Sofia and their property seized. In 1934, Sofia had had around 25,000 Jewish inhabitants, close to a tenth of the city's total population. The German foreign ministry understood that Bulgaria feared the Allies and hoped to avoid antagonizing them. Nonetheless, the ghettoization and curfew of Bulgaria's Jewish population was completed in 1943 and antisemitic racial laws were not repealed until 30 August 1944.

== Soviet occupation of Bulgaria ==
On 8 September, Soviet forces crossed the Bulgarian-Romanian border and on the eve of 8 September garrison detachments, led by Zveno officers, overthrew the government after taking strategic points in Sofia and arresting government ministers. A new government of the Fatherland Front was appointed on 9 September with Kimon Georgiev as prime minister. War was declared on Germany and its allies at once and the divisions sent by the Axis Powers to invade Bulgaria were easily driven back.

A pro-Axis Bulgarian government-in-exile was formed in Vienna, under Aleksandar Tsankov and while it was able to muster a 600-strong Bulgarian SS regiment of Bulgarian anti-communist volunteers already in Germany under a German commander, they had little success. Soviet POWs and interned Soviet citizens were released from Sveti Kirik DPODS detention camp when the Fatherland Front took power. POWs of the western Allies were repatriated by way of Turkey, and the POW camp at Shumen closed on 25 September 1944. The concentration camp for Bulgarian communists and Soviet-sympathisers at Stavroupoli (Bulgarian: Кръстополе, romanized: Krŭstopole) in Greece was closed as the Bulgarians withdrew from occupied territory.

An armistice with the Allies was signed on the 28 October 1944 in Moscow. Signatories were George F. Kennan, Andrey Vyshinsky, and Sir Archibald Clark-Kerr represented by Marshal Fyodor Tolbukhin and Lieut. Gen James Gammell for the Allies and the United Nations Organization, and for the Bulgarians the Foreign Minister Petko Stainov, Finance Minister Petko Stoyanov, and Nikola Petkov and Dobri Terpeshev as ministers without portfolio.

In Macedonia, the Bulgarian troops, surrounded by German forces, and betrayed by high-ranking military commanders, fought their way back to the old borders of Bulgaria. Unlike the Communist resistance, the right wing followers of the Internal Macedonian Revolutionary Organization (IMRO) saw the solution of the Macedonian Question in creating a pro-Bulgarian Independent Macedonian State. At this time the IMRO leader Ivan Mihailov arrived in German reoccupied Skopje, where the Germans hoped that he could form a Macedonian state on the base of former IMRO structures and Ohrana. Seeing that Germany had lost the war and to avoid further bloodshed, after two days he refused and set off. Under the leadership of a new Bulgarian pro-Communist government, three Bulgarian armies (some 455,000 strong in total) entered Yugoslavia in September 1944 and alongside Soviet and Yugoslav forces, moved to Niš and Skopje with the strategic task of blocking the German forces withdrawing from Greece. Southern and eastern Serbia and Macedonia were liberated within a month and the 130,000-strong Bulgarian First Army continued to Hungary, driving off the Germans and entering Austria in April 1945. Contact was established with the British Eighth Army in the town of Klagenfurt on 8 May 1945, the day the Nazi government in Germany capitulated. Then Gen. Vladimir Stoychev signed a demarcation agreement with British V Corps commander Charles Keightley.

== Consequences and results ==
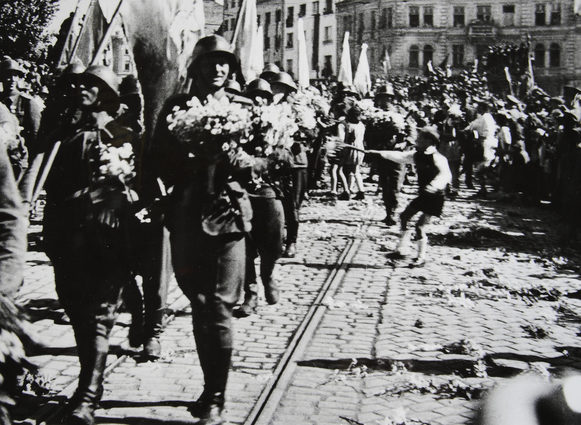
People of Sofia welcoming the First Bulgarian Army on the 17th of June in 1945 after its return from Austria at the end of hostilities in Europe

As a consequence of World War II, the Soviet Union invaded Bulgaria and a communist government was installed in 1946 with Georgi Dimitrov as Prime Minister after the monarchy was abolished and the tsar sent into exile. The People's Republic of Bulgaria was established, lasting until 1990. The Red Army remained in occupation of Bulgaria until 1947. Bulgaria later joined the Warsaw Pact in 1954 and 1968 Warsaw Pact invasion of Czechoslovakia.

Though the Bulgarian armistice with the Soviet Union had surrendered all territory occupied and claimed by Bulgaria in Greek and Yugoslavian Macedonia and Thrace, the Paris Peace Treaties of 1947 confirmed the incorporation of Southern Dobruja into Bulgaria during the War, thus making Bulgaria, apart from Croatia, the only Axis country that increased its pre-war territory. The occupied parts of the Aegean region and Vardar Macedonia remaining within the borders of Bulgaria were returned, with 150,000 Bulgarians being expelled from Western Thrace.

Subsequent to their ordeal during the war, most of Bulgaria's remaining Jews, some 50,000 in September 1944 emigrated. About 35,000 left for Palestine during the British Mandate and the great majority of the remainder departed to the post-1948 State of Israel; by the first years of the 1950s some 45,000 Bulgarian Jews had left the post-war communist state.

== Armed forces ==
By the end of the war, Bulgaria managed to mobilize about 450,000 men. Military equipment was mostly of German origin. By 1945, Bulgaria had also received stocks of Soviet weaponry, mostly small arms.

== See also ==
- 1940s in Bulgaria
- Bulgarian irredentism
- Bulgarian resistance movement during World War II
- Bulgarian government-in-exile
- Bulgaria–Russia relations
- National Liberation War of Macedonia
- Ohrana
- Military of Bulgaria
- Interwar Bulgaria
