= Second Horse Division (Bulgaria) =

Military division in Bulgaria

The Second Horse Division was a Bulgarian Army cavalry division operating during the First and Second World Wars.

== History ==
The Second Cavalry Division was formed on May 5, 1916 and consisted of the 2nd and 3rd Horse Brigades. It took part in First World War and was disbanded on July 30, 1919.

In March 1936, the division was re-formed and renamed the "Second Rapid Horse Division". In 1941 and between 1943 and 1944 it was mobilized and became part of the Covering Front (bg:Прикриващ фронт) screening Bulgaria from Turkey. It participated in the first phase of the war against Germany.

== Names ==
Over the years, the division had two names:

- Second Horse Division (1916—1919)
- Second Rapid Horse Division (1936—1944)
