= Interwar Bulgaria =

Bulgarian history between the two World Wars

Bulgaria during the interwar period, showing territories lost under the Treaty of Neuilly-sur-Seine, which ended Bulgaria's involvement in World War I.

The interwar period in Bulgaria covers the history of the Kingdom of Bulgaria from the armistice of September 1918, which ended the country's participation in World War I, to its entry into World War II in the spring of 1941.

Despite being the most egalitarian society in Eastern Europe in terms of property ownership, offering significant social mobility, and having no major cultural minorities, Bulgaria experienced chronic violence and the rise of extremist left and right-wing movements during this period. Most of the violence stemmed from the large community of irredentist Bulgaro-Macedonians settled in the country, though anarchists and communists occasionally contributed as well. National politics were turbulent, with numerous parties formed not on ideological differences, but as platforms for their leaders' political careers.

Bulgarian interwar politics can be divided into several phases: an initial period of sweeping reforms under the Bulgarian Agrarian National Union from the end of the war until the coup of 1923, followed by successive governments led by the coup leaders until the onset of the Great Depression. This economic crisis brought a new coalition of reformist parties to power in 1931. They remained in control until another coup was conducted by Zveno, which held power for just one year before the monarch of the period, Boris III, assumed effective control. He retained power until the end of the interwar period and the start of World War II.

== Background ==
The military defeat, partly due to army desertions, war fatigue, and severe hardships on the home front, was formalized in the armistice of September 29, 1918. A few days later, on October 4, King Ferdinand I of Bulgaria, discredited by successive military defeats in the 1913 and 1918, abdicated in favor of his son Boris III and went into exile.

Despite these political changes, unrest persisted. A military rebellion in Radomir alarmed the government, which quickly released the popular agrarian politician Aleksandar Stamboliyski, who had opposed the war. The Malinov government, which succeeded Vasil Radoslavov in June, was unable to govern or alleviate the dire food situation, surviving only due to fears of a potential Serbian or Greek invasion. Following Romania's occupation of Southern Dobruja, which violated the September armistice, Malinov resigned on November 28, 1918, paving the way for a coalition led by Teodor Teodorov.

== Postwar Period ==
=== Peace negotiations ===
Bulgarian territory between 1919 (Treaty of Neuilly-sur-Seine) and 1940 (Craiova Agreement).

Following territorial losses from the defeat in the Second Balkan War, the new failure in the world war required Bulgaria to cede Southern Dobruja, the country's "breadbasket", to Romania, certain strategic enclaves to Yugoslavia, and Western Thrace, rich in tobacco and Bulgaria's access to the Aegean Sea, to Greece. The country's territory shrank from 111,836 km^{2} to 103,836 km^{2}. Despite nationalist outrage over the loss of Macedonia, which they considered Bulgarian, the losses of Dobruja and Thrace had a greater economic impact. These territorial losses made Bulgaria a revisionist state, opposed to the political system established by the Paris Peace Conference. The peace treaty also mandated war reparations, payable in currency and livestock, and restricted the size of Bulgaria's army and police forces.

The first reparation payment was deferred from 1921 to 1923, but the Sofia government refused to pay, claiming inability. The Allied commission overseeing payments then authorized neighboring countries to occupy Bulgarian customs posts and the Pernik mines, but Yugoslavia's reluctance to act, to avoid straining recently improved relations, led to inaction. Negotiations followed, resulting in a March 1923 agreement that eased Bulgaria's burden: payments were spread over sixty years until 1983, in two phases. The initial payment was reduced from 105 million to just five million, and by the time war reparations were abandoned in 1932, Bulgaria had paid only 70 million francs instead of the agreed-upon 2,250 million. Even with the new agreement, payments accounted for nearly a quarter of the state's annual budget.

=== The country's situation ===
The country was exhausted by the war: cereal production was only 47% of pre-war levels, a third of the national livestock had been lost, nearly 40% of the male population had been conscripted, suffering heavy casualties, and territorial losses brought hundreds of thousands of refugees that the state had to support. Bulgaria had been almost continuously at war since 1912, losing 155,000 combatants (over a fifth of men aged 20–50) and over 400,000 wounded (200,000 disabled), plus 150,000 civilian deaths from epidemics. Bulgaria had mobilized the highest proportion of its male population among belligerent nations.

Discontent grew despite the end of fighting. Famine was averted only by massive wheat imports, mostly from the United States. However, severe inflation persisted: by 1919, food prices were twelve times higher than in 1914; by January 1920, it was twenty-five times higher. Delivering livestock as war reparations to neighboring countries worsened the food crisis and fueled price increases. This hit urban classes hardest, as they relied on wages diminished by inflation. Throughout 1919, public anger grew, culminating in a massive July demonstration in the capital, violently suppressed by the socialist interior minister, boosting communists in the August elections. Late that year, socialists and communists, often at odds, united for a general strike, which failed in early 1920 due to the harsh response from Aleksandar Stamboliyski's agrarian government, which deployed the army, police, and the party's "Orange Guard" against strikers, who were harassed by the cabinet.

== The Agrarian Union government ==
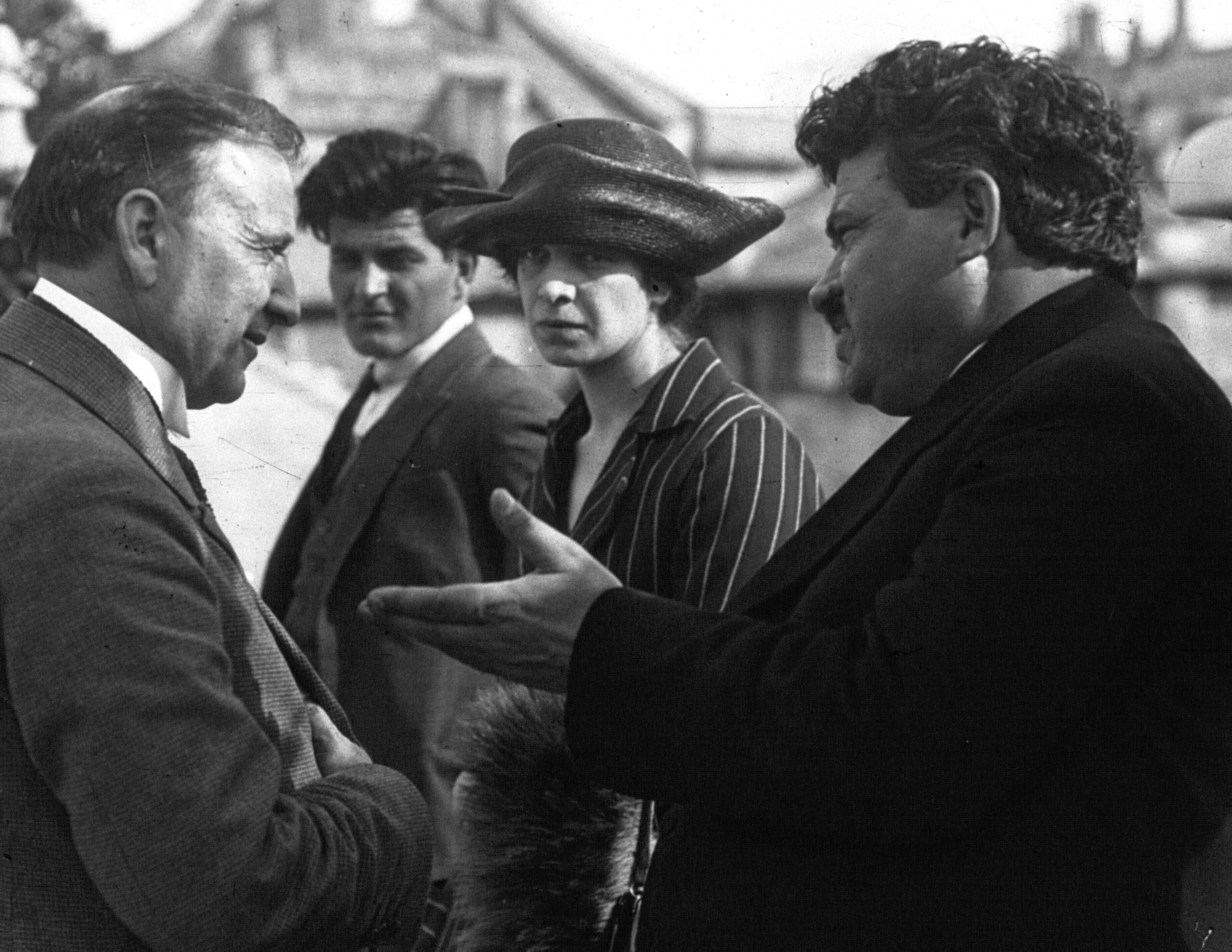
Communist leader Christian Rakovski (left) with agrarian Prime Minister Aleksandar Stamboliyski in 1922. Relations between their parties were poor despite Stamboliyski's initial attempts to gain communist support. Subsequent persecutions led communists to not oppose the coup against him in 1923.

In the August 1919 elections, leftist parties secured victory: the agrarians won 31% of the vote, communists 18%, and socialists 13%. Stamboliyski became prime minister while participating in peace talks with the war's victors. After failing to persuade communists to form a joint cabinet, he formed a coalition with two small bourgeois parties (those of Ivan Evstratiev Geshov and Stoyan Danev) in October.

After crushing the late 1919 general strike, Stamboliyski called elections for March 1920 to secure an absolute majority. Despite a strong result (110 of 229 seats) and intimidating the opposition, communists also performed well (51 seats). He invalidated certain deputies' mandates to achieve the majority he lacked. In May, he formed a new government without coalition partners, relying on a four-seat majority he had engineered in parliament. Stamboliyski then began implementing his reform program, focusing primarily on improving peasant life, often sidelining urban issues. Significant changes occurred during his tenure: a progressive income tax was introduced, an agrarian reform and land consolidation were carried out, cooperatives were promoted, and education, especially in rural areas, was improved. A mandatory labor service was established for public works. Legal services were made more affordable. The Agrarian Union's pacifist stance and desire for good relations with neighbors led Stamboliyski to reduce the army below the size permitted by the peace treaty and place it under civilian control.

However, Stamboliyski's government had significant weaknesses: he was authoritarian, his party lacked trained and expert cadres, and many members exploited their control of the government for personal gain, proving themselves to be as corrupt as their predecessors. His disdain for cities and certain urban classes and professions led to discriminatory or intimidating measures. In September 1922, under the pretext of protecting prominent bourgeois politicians from their own followers, they were imprisoned and later accused of involvement in recent wars; they were released only in the summer of 1923 after the coup against Stamboliyski. In the April 1923 elections, the agrarians intimidated the opposition and made arrests to secure victory, achieving 53% of votes against 18.9% for communists. Measures against Macedonian terrorists failed due to the army's lack of interest in dismantling their organizations.

In international politics, the agrarians sought to comply with the peace treaty while pursuing concessions from the victors. Stamboliyski accepted the cession of Macedonia, believing regional political evolution would lead to a Bulgaro-Yugoslav federation within a larger agrarian confederation, rendering territorial disputes obsolete. This vision, reflected in his support for the Peasant International, led him to reject traditional revisionism and irredentism. His followers promoted the creation of the Agrarian International, which saw little activity, and worked to improve relations with Yugoslavia. Relations with Greece did not improve, as agreement on Thrace proved impossible: Greece offered tax-free zones in ports, while Bulgaria sought territorial concessions. Despite tensions with Bulgarian communists, Stamboliyski maintained cordial relations with the Soviet Union. He secured Bulgaria's entry into the League of Nations, the first defeated nation to join.

The final electoral victory in April 1923 emboldened Stamboliyski, who intensified actions against the opposition: in May, he alarmed the monarchy with comments about establishing a republic, antagonized the military by reshuffling commands and turning the Orange Guard into a semi-official force, provoked Macedonians by banning some of their organizations, and targeted communists by arresting some provincial officials.

=== The coup d'état ===
The Stamboliyski government had alienated key sectors of Bulgarian society. The communists, who viewed his party as bourgeois, faced persecution. Part of urban populations also resented agrarian policies: lawyers were targeted with measures that undermined their welfare, and the military suffered setbacks. Traditional parties grew increasingly hostile, fearing Stamboliyski would soon proclaim a peasant republic. The November 1922 trial of 34 former government officials for their roles in past wars further fueled their discontent with the agrarian government. Macedonian extremists condemned the agreement with the Yugoslavia to address border incidents (the March 1923 Treaty of Niš) and Stamboliyski's lack of interest in reclaiming the region. In 1923, convinced that ousting Stamboliyski constitutionally was impossible and after failing to emulate Mussolini with a "march on Sofia" in September 1922, discontented groups allied to topple Stamboliyski and his government through a coup. In 1922, center and right-wing parties had formed the National Alliance. On June 9, 1923, a coup ended the agrarian government. Days later, Stamboliyski, in his hometown, was found by IMRO members, brutally tortured, and killed by the coup plotters. The king, who despised Stamboliyski, accepted the military coup, though his involvement is debated. The Comintern criticized the passive stance of Bulgarian communist leaders, who had ordered no cooperation with agrarians to oppose the coup, and mandated an uprising, which occurred in September and failed completely. The Communist Party was outlawed in April 1924, but continued operating through affiliated organizations, remaining the most significant communist movement in the Balkans at the time.

== Democratic Alliance Governments ==
=== Moderation and terror ===
After seizing power, the conspirators formed a new organization, the "Democratic Alliance", formally uniting members of the National Alliance and the Military League. The loosely cohesive Alliance soon split between moderates, led by Andrey Lyapchev, and extremists favoring a more authoritarian government, primarily led by economics professor Aleksandar Tsankov, who headed the new government. It included all parties except the agrarians and communists. The decade following the 1923 coup was marked by disorder and violence that tarnished the country's reputation, largely due to government tolerance of IMRO's actions, which fully controlled the Petrich district, Bulgaria's Macedonia. Tsankov's cabinet viewed IMRO as useful for fueling territorial revisionism and eliminating troublesome political opponents, despite its difficulty to control.

Democratic Alliance Prime Ministers

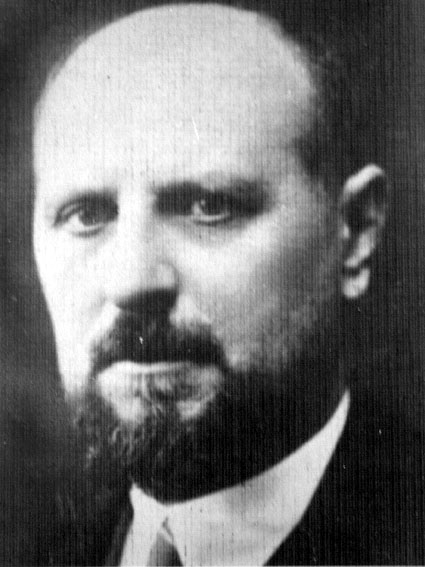
Aleksandar Tsankov, an economics professor and the first head of government after the coup against the agrarians, unleashed brutal repression following the communist attack in April 1925; he was forced to relinquish the presidency in early 1926 due to his association with terror, which was poorly viewed abroad.

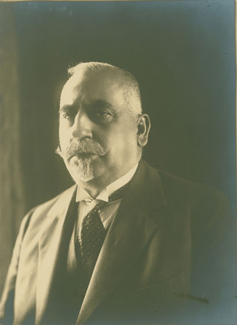
Andrey Lyapchev, the leader of the moderates, succeeded Tsankov in 1926 and led the longest-serving cabinet of the period until his electoral defeat in 1931, amidst the Great Depression.

Aleksandar Tsankov (left), an economics professor and first prime minister after the coup against the agrarians, unleashed brutal repression following the April 1925 communist attack; he was forced to step down in early 1926 due to his association with terror, viewed negatively abroad. Andrey Lyapchev (right), leader of the moderates, succeeded Tsankov in 1926 and led the longest-serving cabinet of the period until his electoral defeat in 1931, amid the Great Depression.

Immediately after the coup, a harsh persecution of agrarians began, leaving them severely weakened and divided. Some agrarians went into exile, while others were imprisoned by the new government. The government continued to permit, and sometimes organized, the assassination of agrarian leaders by IMRO. In September, authorities easily crushed the communist uprising, followed by severe repression with thousands killed. In subsequent years, communists formed various organizations periodically banned by authorities. New elections in November gave the conspirators the expected majority.

On August 1, 1924, a law dismantled much of Stamboliyski's agrarian reform, returning two-thirds of expropriated lands, including those of monasteries and the state, to their former owners. The mandatory labor service introduced by Stamboliyski was retained but applied only to men.

After a period of moderate dominance in which many agrarian policies were retained, a communist bombing in the capital's cathedral on April 16, 1925, which killed 128 people but failed to assassinate the king or Alliance leaders, drastically changed the situation. Tsankov led an extreme repression, with thousands arrested, some disappearing in the hands of security forces, and others executed by authorities. The Allies, wary of communists, allowed a temporary increase in the army's size to combat them. The need for international credit to improve the refugee situation forced Tsankov's resignation: although the League of Nations supported Bulgaria's loan request (in exchange for refugees accepting Bulgarian nationality), lenders demanded the removal of Tsankov and his followers, who were blamed for the terror, before granting Sofia the requested funds.

=== The long Lyapchev government ===
On 4 January, Tsankov relinquished the presidency of the Council of Ministers to Andrey Lyapchev, a Macedonian and member of the Democratic Party, who led the longest-serving government of the period, lasting until June 1931. During his tenure, repression of the opposition was moderated compared to the previous period. In contrast, the IMRO increased its activities with the prime minister's approval. Tsankov, appointed president of the Bulgarian Lower House, became Lyapchev's internal opposition, criticizing his "tolerance" of communists, his favorable stance toward foreign investment, and his permissiveness toward the IMRO, which strained relations with neighboring countries.

==== The Macedonian issue ====
During his presidency, Lyapchev faced ongoing issues related to Macedonia and the extremists of the Internal Macedonian Revolutionary Organization, who continued their violent actions and internal factional clashes. His Macedonian background did not appease the extremists. Between 1923 and 1934, they are estimated to have killed around 800 people in Bulgaria. Their intimidation or elimination of figures deemed insufficiently irredentist was relentless. By the decade's end, factional conflicts added to the violence. Those favoring Macedonian autonomy clashed with those advocating annexation to Bulgaria, supported by the Sofia government. Macedonians not only complicated Bulgaria's internal situation, but also affected its international relations. They continued raids into Yugoslavia from Petrich and, in October 1925, caused a serious incident with Greece: they occupied a Greek border post and killed a border guard, prompting a strong Greek response. A Greek division occupied border areas for five days, killing twelve Bulgarians, seven of them civilians. Although the League of Nations commission ordered Greece's withdrawal and payment of compensation, its envoy recommended a prompt population exchange. Meanwhile, Yugoslavia's administration of its part of the former Macedonia was inadequate and sometimes abusive, while Greece used its portion to settle nearly half a million refugees from Turkish territory after the Greco-Turkish War.

Macedonians occupied numerous administrative posts, partly to moderate them, to the discontent of some Bulgarians, and wielded significant influence in the army. Their presence in liberal professions, commerce, and higher education was also notable. By the decade's end, both Yugoslavia and Bulgaria sought to end ongoing border tensions, and Lyapchev arrested some Macedonian leaders to facilitate an agreement with Belgrade. The 1929 and 1930 Pirot agreements, addressing various border issues, marked the first step in improving Belgrade-Sofia relations.

==== International policy ====
In international politics, Bulgarian governments, eager to gain support from a major power for their revisionist ambitions, particularly regarding Thrace, grew closer to Fascist Italy under Mussolini. Macedonian nationalist activities hindered improved relations with Yugoslavia during the 1920s, though their suppression in 1934, under a different government, allowed normalization.

==== Political situation ====
Following the persecution of the agrarians and the banning of the communists in 1924, Bulgarian politics fell to traditional parties, which lacked ideology or social programs and functioned as cliques focused on distributing public offices. To facilitate cabinet formation despite deep divisions and rivalries among these parties, Lyapchev passed a law, similar to one introduced by Mussolini in Italy, granting the majority of parliamentary seats to the party with the most votes. This law encouraged rapid coalition-building to secure government control, further discrediting political parties but ensuring Lyapchev's stability in parliament. In the chaotic 1927 elections, still under government coalition intimidation, Lyapchev's coalition emerged victorious against various opposition coalitions, though the opposition collectively gained more votes.

== The People's Bloc and the Great Depression ==
The unusually free elections of 1931 led to the formation of a new government under the opposition "People's Bloc", a coalition including a splinter group of agrarians, alongside Democrats, Radicals, and part of the National Liberals. The decision to hold free elections was partly driven by growing social tensions due to the arrival of the Great Depression in Bulgaria. Veteran politician Aleksandar Malinov formed a new government in June, which transitioned to another People's Bloc government in October. The Bloc remained in power for the next three years, grappling with the Great Depression and IMRO. Meanwhile, the Democratic Alliance disintegrated, unable to maintain its fragile cohesion once out of power.

=== The Great Depression in Bulgaria ===
Lyapchev's decision to adopt the gold standard in 1928 harmed national finances: the overvalued currency hindered exports and forced the government to cut spending.

The Great Depression affected Bulgaria less severely than other countries, partly because its predominantly rural population was accustomed to a low standard of living. Nonetheless, per capita peasant income halved between 1929 and 1933, while urban incomes fell by 27%. The economic crisis hit Bulgaria earlier than other nations, triggered by a collapse in global tobacco prices, which accounted for 41% of the country's exports. Prices for other agricultural products plummeted after the Creditanstalt collapse in 1931. Initially, peasants, believing the price drop was temporary, reduced sales, causing urban shortages and necessitating costly grain imports from Yugoslavia. Falling peasant incomes made it difficult to repay loans or secure new ones, reduced consumption, and lowered demand for urban goods, affecting cities as well. Lack of demand and credit access led businesses to cut wages and lay off workers.

Successive governments, first under Lyapchev and later the People's Bloc, attempted to alleviate public hardships with limited success. Lyapchev established a grain export agency that, while unable to raise international prices, guaranteed a buyer for production. In 1931, the People's Bloc passed a law to regulate commercial and industrial groups and created a commission to control prices of essential goods. Peasant debt repayment was reformed, with debts reduced and payment periods extended. Though palliative and counterproductive in the long term, these measures calmed the peasantry and prevented radicalization.

=== Political radicalization ===
During the economic crisis, the Communist Party emerged as the leading opposition force, surpassing the stagnant socialists and the weakened agrarians, who were divided internally. Its membership grew from 6,000 in 1930 to 35,000 two years later; in the November 1930 municipal elections, it secured a higher vote share (11%) than any other opposition party. Public discontent fueled the communists, who operated as the Bulgarian Workers' Party after the Communist Party's 1923 ban. In the November 1931 local elections, they performed strongly, and in February 1932, they won an absolute majority in the capital's city council, which the government promptly dissolved. The government also stripped 15 of the 29 communist deputies of their mandates. Communist-led disturbances, strikes, and conspiracies increased but were harshly suppressed by the government, sometimes with the killing of activists, which managed to curb their activities.

The far right also gained ground during this period, with Tsankov's National Social Movement as the leading party of this trend. On May 19, Colonel Damian Velchev of the Military League, who had participated in Stamboliyski's overthrow, staged a coup, supported by the elitist political association "Zveno", founded in 1927 and led by another colonel, Kimon Georgiev. The People's Bloc, which had not significantly altered the policies of previous governments, had lost credibility among parts of the population due to its inability to resolve the economic crisis, over which it had little control, internal power struggles among coalition parties, and its tolerance of Macedonian extremists' extortion and assassinations. A routine cabinet crisis over portfolio distribution was the immediate trigger for the coup, but the broader economic crisis, government discredit, chronic violence, and public frustration ensured its success and explain the lack of opposition. Tsankov and his Nazi-aligned followers had been preparing to act, but the coup's officers and technocrats preempted them to prevent Tsankov's maneuver, which could have led to civil war.

== Zveno ==
Georgiev became head of the new cabinet. Velchev, the coup's key figure, former head of the cadet academy and influential among young officers, took an advisory role without joining the cabinet. The new government immediately launched its program of "centralization, rationalization, and modernization". Zveno, with about 300 members and 2,000 subscribers to its publication under the same name, was authoritarian and modernizing, but not fascist. It centralized power by banning political parties and closing parliament, transferring its powers to the cabinet. It abolished the 1879 constitution. Bulgaria's sixteen regions were reorganized into seven new provinces with centrally appointed governments. Mayors, elected since 1878, were now selected by the central government. Required to have at least secondary education and legal knowledge, these new mayors were often career bureaucrats with no ties to their constituents and primarily focused on advancing their positions. Many had participated in the terror during Tsankov's tenure, making them even more unpopular. The number of ministries and civil servants was reduced by a third.

Zveno established a new corporatist parliament inspired by fascist models. It imposed a single trade union and created an agency to control culture and media, which were censored and served as a propaganda tool, though with little success among the population.

=== International policy ===
In July 1934, the Soviet Union and Bulgaria established diplomatic relations, an action widely supported by the population. Relations with Yugoslavia also continued to improve. Alexander I of Yugoslavia visited Sofia in October 1933, and in 1934, partly in response to the creation of the Balkan Entente and the 1933 London Convention defining aggressor states, the government sent the army to Petrich and dispersed IMRO members. The unexpected and popular crackdown on Macedonian extremists was completely successful, facilitating rapprochement between Yugoslavia and Bulgaria. The subsequent assassination of the Yugoslav monarch in Marseille by an IMRO gunman allied with Croatian Ustaše did not derail the Bulgaro-Yugoslav rapprochement. In January 1937, the two countries signed a friendship treaty.

== Royal government ==
In January 1935, the king, backed by the generals, withdrew his tacit support for Zveno, doing so easily due to Zveno's limited support among both the population and the army. Zveno had not sought to build a mass popular organization to sustain its power. The monarch, who had tense relations with Velchev and distrusted Zveno's cabinet over which he had no control, facilitated its ouster. The latter half of the 1930s was marked by efforts to draft a new constitution and shifts in international policy driven by changes in European politics.

The king secured Velchev's return from exile, tried, and convicted him, using the trial to dissolve the Military League and purge several republican officers from the armed forces. The monarch wished to retain power, and the new elected Courts, which enjoyed only the ability to advise the royal Government, in the March 1938 elections, with a restricted census and no political parties, only individual candidates, were soon partially dissolved when it proved insufficiently compliant. The March 1939 elections were even more tightly controlled by the government, as were those in January 1940. From the coup against Zveno on 22 January, Boris dominated Bulgarian politics through a series of military and civilian cabinets until his sudden death in August 1943. Though officially banned, political parties survived underground.

Boris also abolished Zveno's potentially radical social and political measures but retained others, such as the new parliamentary structure, the single trade union, administrative reforms, actions against Macedonian extremists, and improved relations with Yugoslavia and the USSR.

== Eve of World War II ==
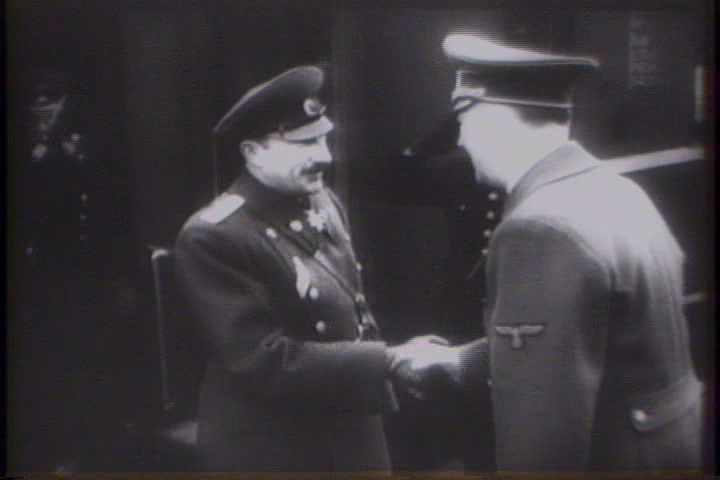
Boris III and Hitler in 1943, shortly before the former's death. Boris sought to maintain Bulgaria's neutrality in the world war but ultimately joined the Axis in March 1941; Bulgaria received long-desired territorial concessions for its participation in the conflict.

Amid growing political tensions in Europe, Boris and his government sought to maintain neutrality and strengthen their position through agreements with other Balkan countries, signing a friendship agreement with Yugoslavia in January 1937. However, national revisionism favored closer ties with fascist powers. The growing importance of Germany in Bulgarian trade further increased its influence and inclination to align with it. Most Bulgarian armaments came from Germany, which also supported specialized crop expansion that boosted peasant purchasing power, improving conditions in the late 1930s. Rising European tensions led Bulgaria to rearm, despite the 1919 peace treaty's restrictions: in 1934, it lacked a military air force, but by 1939, it had 258 aircraft. Germany's unusual willingness to train Bulgarian army officers further enhanced its influence.

In February 1940, the king appointed the pro-German Bogdan Filov as prime minister, and some antisemitic legislation was passed. On September 7, 1940, Germany forced Romania to cede Southern Dobruja to Bulgaria in the Treaty of Craiova, yet the king hesitated to abandon neutrality. He rejected Italy's proposal to join an attack on Greece in exchange for recovering Western Thrace, and a Soviet offer to join a new Moscow-controlled "security zone". When Germany decided to attack Greece to aid Italian units repelled by the Greeks in the winter of 1940, requiring passage through Bulgarian territory, Boris finally agreed to sign the Tripartite Pact on March 1, 1941, one day before German troops entered Bulgaria.

Following the coup in Yugoslavia later that month, which convinced Hitler to invade Yugoslavia and Greece simultaneously, Bulgaria joined the military operation, entering the war in exchange for territorial concessions: control over most of Macedonia, part of the Morava valley, and Western Thrace. By then, Germany effectively controlled Bulgaria's economy. Calculating and cunning, Boris participated only in actions he deemed beneficial to Bulgaria's interests: he allowed German troops to pass but did not directly join the attack; he declared war on the Western Allies only after Pearl Harbor, but not on the USSR; he deported Jews from occupied territories, but not those that came from Bulgaria.

== Economy and society ==
Bulgarian society during the interwar period was predominantly agrarian, with around 80% of the population engaged in farming. The proportion of rural to urban population remained largely unchanged, with four out of five people living in rural areas. Although urban population growth slightly outpaced rural growth (17% versus 12%), cities remained few: by the late 1920s, only 26 settlements had over 20,000 inhabitants. The capital had about 230,000 residents, up from 20,000 in 1880, followed by Plovdiv (82,000) and Varna (60,000). The country also had around 5,000 villages and hamlets, with 269 having 2,000 to 10,000 residents and 882 having 1,000 to 2,000, according to the 1920 census.

It was the most egalitarian society in the Balkans in terms of income, primarily composed of smallholder peasants. The population grew rapidly, from 4,846,971 in the 1920 census to 6,077,939 in 1934, the last census before World War II. This natural increase was augmented by the arrival of numerous refugees after World War I and the Russian Civil War.

Ethnic minorities were small and relatively stable, with only the Greek minority significantly reduced due to population exchanges. Treatment of minorities was generally fair and generous.

Although land distribution was highly egalitarian, more so than in any other regional country by the period's end, per capita land holdings shrank due to population growth and the inability to expand arable land proportionately. With limited opportunities in other sectors, new population remained in agriculture. The number of peasant households rose by 17.9%, while the average size of their plots decreased by 14%. Rural overpopulation increased, and farming technology was outdated. Production was low, as were consumption and capital accumulation for most of the population. A 1934 study found that at least 45.9% of peasants earned insufficient income to cover expenses, forcing them into debt. However, the cooperative system was widespread. Unlike most neighboring countries, successive Bulgarian governments invested in improving agriculture with technology and capital. Territorial losses had adverse effects: Dobruja, despite comprising only 8% of the territory, produced 20% of the nation's cereals, and the loss of Thrace complicated exports by lengthening maritime routes.

Industrialization was limited, but accelerated on the eve of World War II, driven by Germany, which steered Bulgaria toward light industry for processing raw materials, mostly exported to the Reich, which dominated Bulgaria's foreign trade. In 1934, Germany accounted for 42.7% of exports and 40.1% of imports; by 1939, this rose to 67.8% and 65.5%, respectively. Trade with the Allies was minimal, despite France holding three-fifths of Bulgaria's national debt, and trade with neighbors was limited to importing Romanian oil. In 1935, industry contributed only 6.3% to GDP, while agriculture accounted for 53% and crafts 7.6%. As in neighboring countries, foreign capital was significant in trade and industry: in 1936, 31% of banking capital, 49% of industrial capital, and 55% of transport capital was foreign.

Social security and insurance systems were the most advanced in the region, as was the healthcare system, though far inferior to Western Europe's. Education, mandatory until the age of 14, was accessible even to the poorest, enjoyed high prestige, and enabled social mobility, but suffered from inadequate facilities and poorly paid teachers. Literacy was the highest in the Balkans, at 79.6% for men and 57.2% for women in 1934. Despite an oversupply of university graduates entering politics and public administration due to limited private-sector jobs, as in neighboring countries, Bulgaria's administration was of higher quality, and the proportion of graduates in applied fields was greater. Women's suffrage, restricted to married women with children, was granted in 1934.

== Assessment ==
While Bulgarian society was generally egalitarian, progressive, and conducive to social mobility, its politics were turbulent, dominated by personalist parties lacking ideological distinctions, serving mainly as platforms for their leaders' ambitions. The absence of strong monarchical authority between Ferdinand's abdication in 1918 and Boris's consolidation of power in the mid-1930s highlighted the flawed party system. During the interwar period, 40 political formations gained parliamentary representation. Even socialist parties split into the more popular communists and less influential socialists, while the agrarians fragmented into numerous factions after Stamboliyski's death. Stamboliyski's government, a mix of admirable idealism and discrediting practices, undermined agrarianism in the region. Power was contested among radical parties (agrarians and Marxists), traditional parties, the military, and, by the late 1930s, the Crown.

Despite the postwar agrarian government's measures, rural material conditions did not improve significantly. Social legislation was not fully implemented, partly due to weak unions to advocate for it. However, the mandatory labor service, introduced under the agrarian government and retained after its overthrow, facilitated numerous essential public works. As in other regional countries, an excess of university-educated intellectuals aspired to state employment due to scarce private-sector opportunities.

== Bibliography ==
- Bell, John D. (1977). Peasants in power : Alexander Stamboliski and the Bulgarian Agrarian National Union, 1899-1923. Princeton University Press. ISBN 9780691075846.
- Crampton, R. J. (2007). "Bulgaria". Oxford University Press. Archived from the original on 2016-03-11 – via Questia.
- Crampton, R. J. (2009). Aleksandŭr Stamboliĭski, Bulgaria. Haus Publishing. ISBN 9781905791774.
- Evans, Stanley G. (December 1960). A short history of Bulgaria. London: Lawrence & Wishart Ltd.
- Jelavich, Barbara (1999). History of the Balkans. Twentieth century. Cambridge University Press. ISBN 0521274591.
- Magocsi, Paul Roberts (2002). Historical Atlas of Central Europe. University of Washington Press. ISBN 9780295981468.
- Rothschild, Joseph (1990). East Central Europe Between the Two World Wars. University of Washington Press. ISBN 9780295953571.
- Stavrianos, L. S. (2000) [1958]. The Balkans since 1453. NYU Press. ISBN 978-0814797662.
- Tchitchovsky, T. (1929). "Political and Social Aspects of Modern Bulgaria II". The Slavonic and East European Review. 7 (21): 595–603. JSTOR 4202335.
- Tchitchovsky, T. (1929). "Political and Social Aspects of Modern Bulgaria III". The Slavonic and East European Review. 8 (22): 176–187. JSTOR 4202371.
