= Dobri Bozhilov =

Bulgarian politician

- Добри Божилов
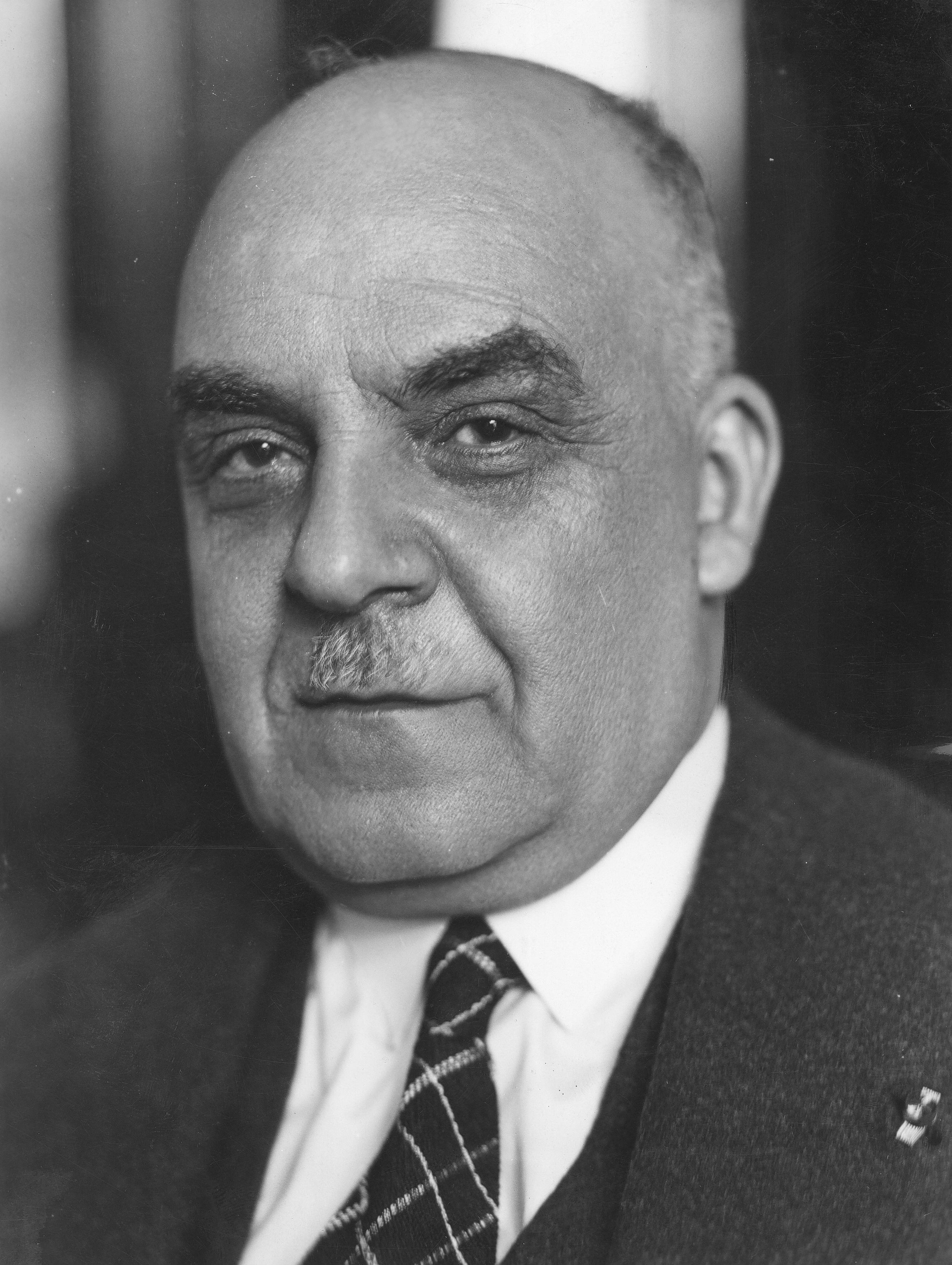
- Bozhilov in 1942

29th Prime Minister of Bulgaria
- In office 14 September 1943 – 1 June 1944
- Monarch: Simeon II
- Preceded by: Petur Gabrovski (Acting)
- Succeeded by: Ivan Ivanov Bagryanov

Personal details
- Born: 13 June 1884 Kotel, Eastern Rumelia
- Died: 1 February 1945 (aged 60) Sofia, Bulgaria
- Political party: Non-Party

Dobri Bozhilov Khadzhiyanakev (Bulgarian: Добри Божилов Хаджиянакиев) (June 13, 1884 – February 1, 1945) was Prime Minister of Bulgaria during World War II.

== Biography ==
Born in Kotel, Bulgaria, Bozhilov attended the Higher Commercial School in Svishtov before starting work as a bookkeeper at the Bulgarian National Bank for the Kyustendil Banking Agency in 1902. Bozhilov worked for the Bulgarian National Bank for a total of 36 years and served at various times as its governor (1922-1923, 1923-1924, 1931-1932, 1934-1935, 1935-1938, 1944).

In November 1938, Bozhilov became Minister of Finance in the government of Prime Minister Georgi Kyoseivanov, a position which Bozhilov kept when Bogdan Filov became prime minister in 1940. In 1943, after Tsar Boris III died, Filov became one of Bulgaria’s three regents. Filov, a fervent ally of Nazi Germany and the most powerful of the regents, used his power to appoint Bozhilov (another pro-German) prime minister.

As prime minister, Bozhilov worked closely with the Germans, virtually becoming their puppet as World War II raged. Essentially the only major issue on which he clashed with the Nazis was their demand for Bulgaria’s government to deport the country’s Jews to extermination camps, which Bozhilov refused to do. In June 1944, at which time the Axis war effort was rapidly deteriorating, Bozhilov resigned as prime minister and returned to the Bulgarian National Bank, once again becoming its governor. In September 1944, the Soviet Union declared war on Bulgaria and invaded it, giving Communist partisans the opportunity to overthrow Prime Minister Konstantin Muraviev and replace him with Kimon Georgiev. Bozhilov was subsequently arrested and tried by a People’s Court instituted by the Fatherland Front government. He was found guilty of war crimes and a variety of misdeeds he had committed while finance minister, sentenced to death, and executed in February 1945. The verdict was revoked in 1996 by Supreme Court.

Political offices
Preceded by Petur Gabrovski	Prime Minister of Bulgaria; 1943–1944	Succeeded by Ivan Bagryanov
