= Waffen Grenadier Regiment of the SS (1st Bulgarian) =

- German: Waffen-Grenadier Regiment der SS (Bulgarisches Nr. 1)
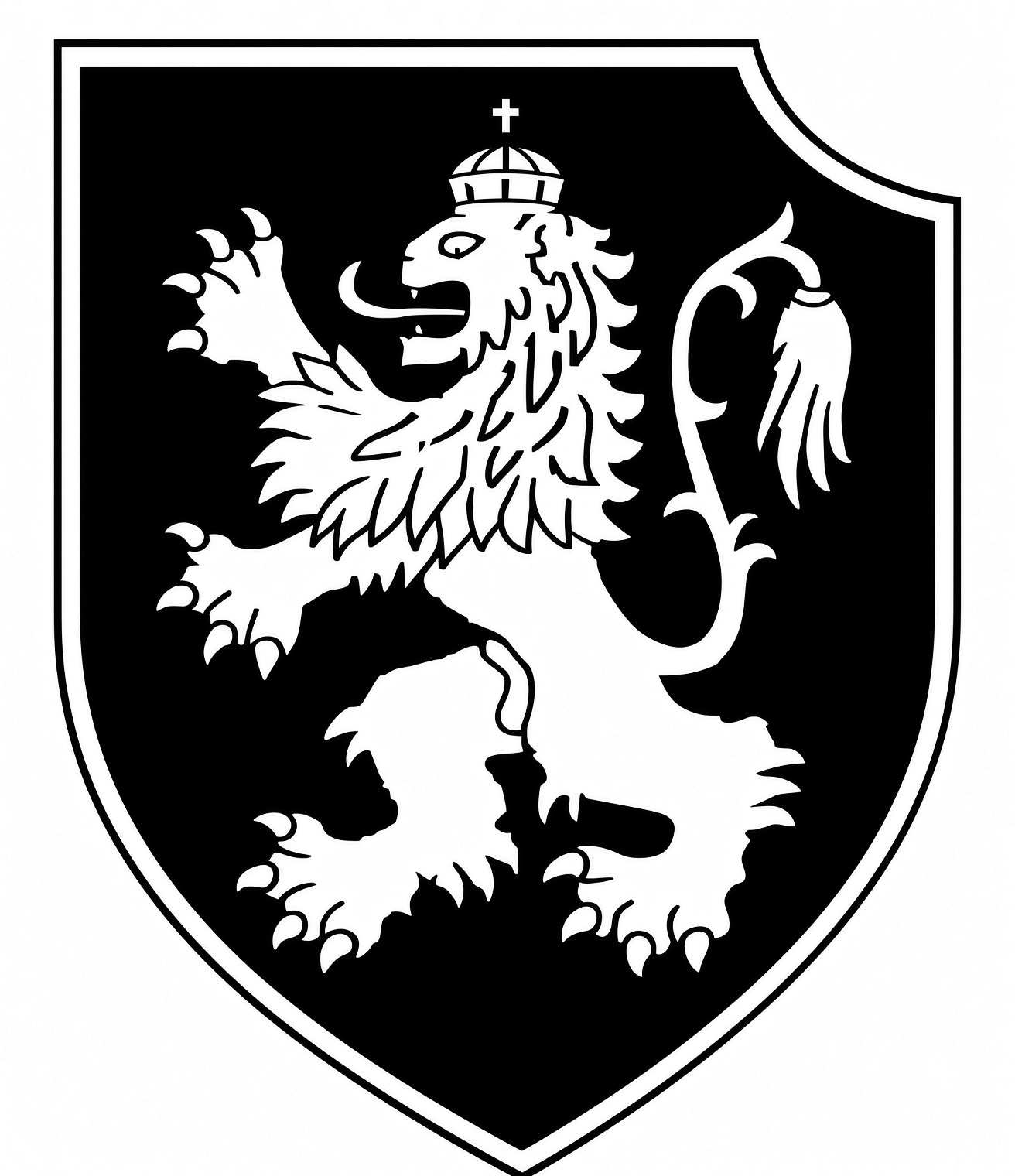
- Active: September 1944–May 1945
- Country: Nazi Germany
- Branch: Waffen-SS
- Type: Infantry
- Role: Construction
- Size: Division
- Engagements: World War II: Yugoslav Front; Battle of the Oder–Neisse

Insignia
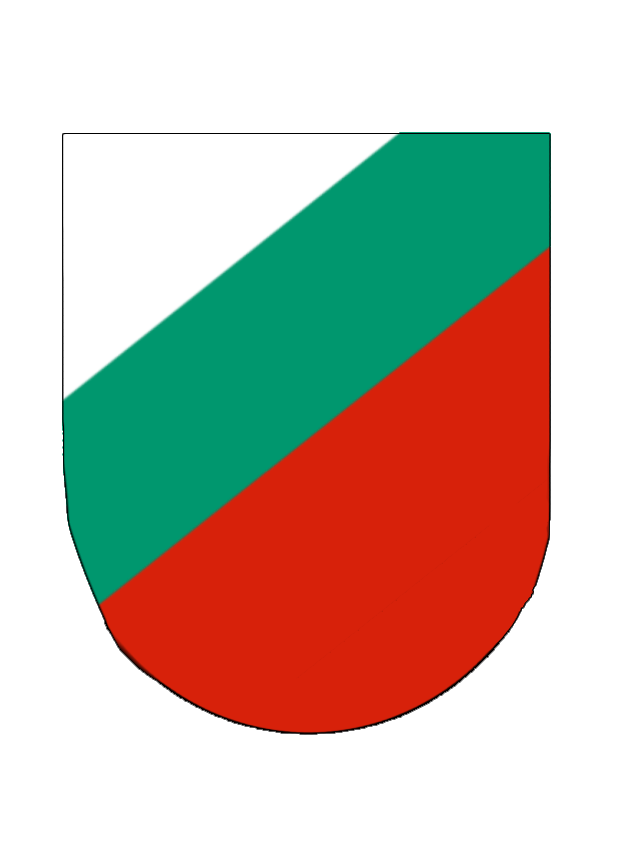
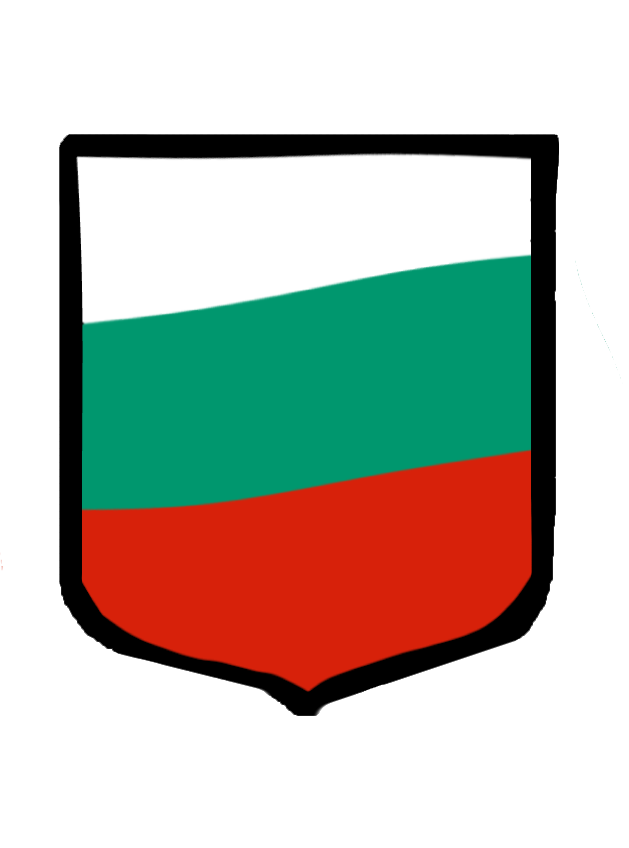
- Sleeve shields used by the Bulgarian volunteers

The Waffen Grenadier Regiment of the SS (1st Bulgarian) (German: Waffen-Grenadier Regiment der SS (Bulgarisches Nr. 1)) was a German Waffen-SS unit formed in World War II. It was created when Bulgaria left the Axis powers and joined the Allies in September 1944. Hitler hoped to raise two divisions of SS volunteers from among Bulgarians to fight on the side of Nazi Germany, but the Soviet advance into Bulgaria meant this never materialized.

== Formation and activity ==
It was made up of volunteering Bulgarian workers and soldiers who did not agree with their government's decision to change their allegiance to the Allies. Only small numbers of pro-German Bulgarians were able to join outside Bulgaria, including some from the Bulgarian Fifth Army engaged in the occupation of Yugoslavia. The formation fought initially in occupied territories in Yugoslavia and Greece, in a corps under the command of General Friedrich-Wilhelm Müller. They fought to protected the retreat of the German Army Group E in the Vardar valley. Most of the volunteers were attached to German military units in the late 1944.

The unit pledged allegiance to Aleksandar Tsankov's Bulgarian government-in-exile. Morale was not very high. Soldiers were forced to plant potatoes in a nearby field due to ration shortages. The regiment was transferred to the Eastern Front in January 1945, participating in the Battle of the Oder–Neisse against Soviet troops. The unit was re-equipped with anti-tank weaponry in April 1945 and renamed the SS Tank Destroyer Regiment. At that time a group of soldiers made an attempt to desert. They were hunted down and caught and a firefight ensued, in which three deserters were killed. At the onset of the Allies in early May, the regiment disbanded itself.

== Commanders ==
- SS-Standartenführer Günther Anhalt
- SS-Oberführer Heinz Bertling
- SS-Oberführer Bogosanow
- SS-Oberführer Rogozarow
