= Ivan Bagrianov =

Prime Minister of Bulgaria

Ivan Bagryanov
- Иван Багрянов
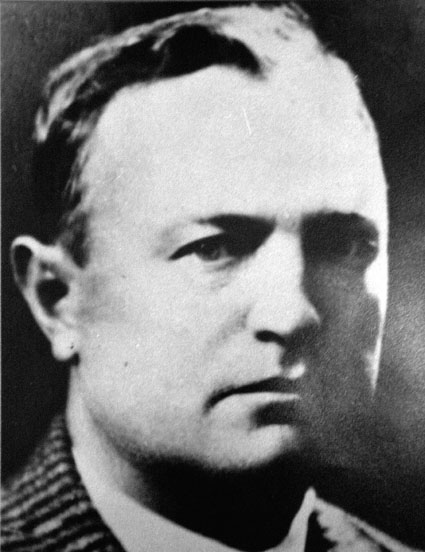

30th Prime Minister of Bulgaria
- In office 1 June 1944 – 2 September 1944
- Monarch: Simeon II
- Preceded by: Dobri Bozhilov
- Succeeded by: Konstantin Muraviev

Personal details
- Born: 29 October 1891 Razgrad, Principality of Bulgaria
- Died: 1 February 1945 (aged 53) Sofia, Kingdom of Bulgaria
- Party: Independent

Ivan Ivanov Bagryanov (Bulgarian: Иван Иванов Багрянов; 17 October 1891 – 1 February 1945) was a leading Bulgarian politician who briefly served as Prime Minister during the Second World War.

== Biography ==
After a career as a diplomat, he was chosen by the Council of Regents, who at the time had power in Bulgaria, to form a government capable of negotiating peace. In contrast to his predecessor, Dobri Bozhilov, Bagryanov was known for his largely pro-Western views. He saw his mission as removing Bulgaria from the war before the arrival of the Red Army and so attempted to open negotiations with the Western Allies. He also opened dialogue with Jewish leaders in an attempt to end anti-Jewish legislation. However, the coup by Michael I of Romania on August 23, 1944 severely damaged this plan as it ended effective Romanian resistance and allowed the Red Army a free hand to advance into Bulgaria. Bagryanov continued his drive to find separate peace, repudiating any alliance with Nazi Germany on August 26 and declaring neutrality, ending all anti-Jewish laws on August 29 (although it was officially ratified by the new government of Konstantin Muraviev on September 5) and ordering the withdrawal of Bulgarian troops from Yugoslavian Macedonia. However, Bagryanov's insistence on neutrality, rather than declaring war on the Axis powers, hamstrung negotiations with the Allies and he was removed from government. After the Communist-led Fatherland front came to power he was amongst those tried for war crimes by the People's Court and executed on 1 February 1945 along with the regents of Bulgaria and other ministers and deputies. The verdict was revoked only in 1996 by Supreme Court.

== Legacy ==
There are two streets in Sofia named after him – in Studentski grad and Boyana.

Political offices
Preceded by Dobri Bozhilov	Prime Minister of Bulgaria; 1944	Succeeded by Konstantin Muraviev
Preceded by Dimitar Shishmanov	Minister of Foreign Affairs of Bulgaria; 1944	Succeeded by Parvan Draganov
