= Bulgarian government-in-exile =

1944–45 WWII Nazi-aligned government

Bulgarian national government-in-exile Българско национално правителство в изгнание
- 1944–1945
- Flag
- Status: puppet government of Nazi Germany
- Capital: None
- Capital-in-exile: Vienna
- Common languages: Bulgarian
- Prime Minister
  - 1944—1945: Aleksandar Tsankov
- History
  - Established: 16 September 1944
  - Disestablished: 10 May 1945
Preceded by	Succeeded by
Kingdom of Bulgaria	Kingdom of Bulgaria

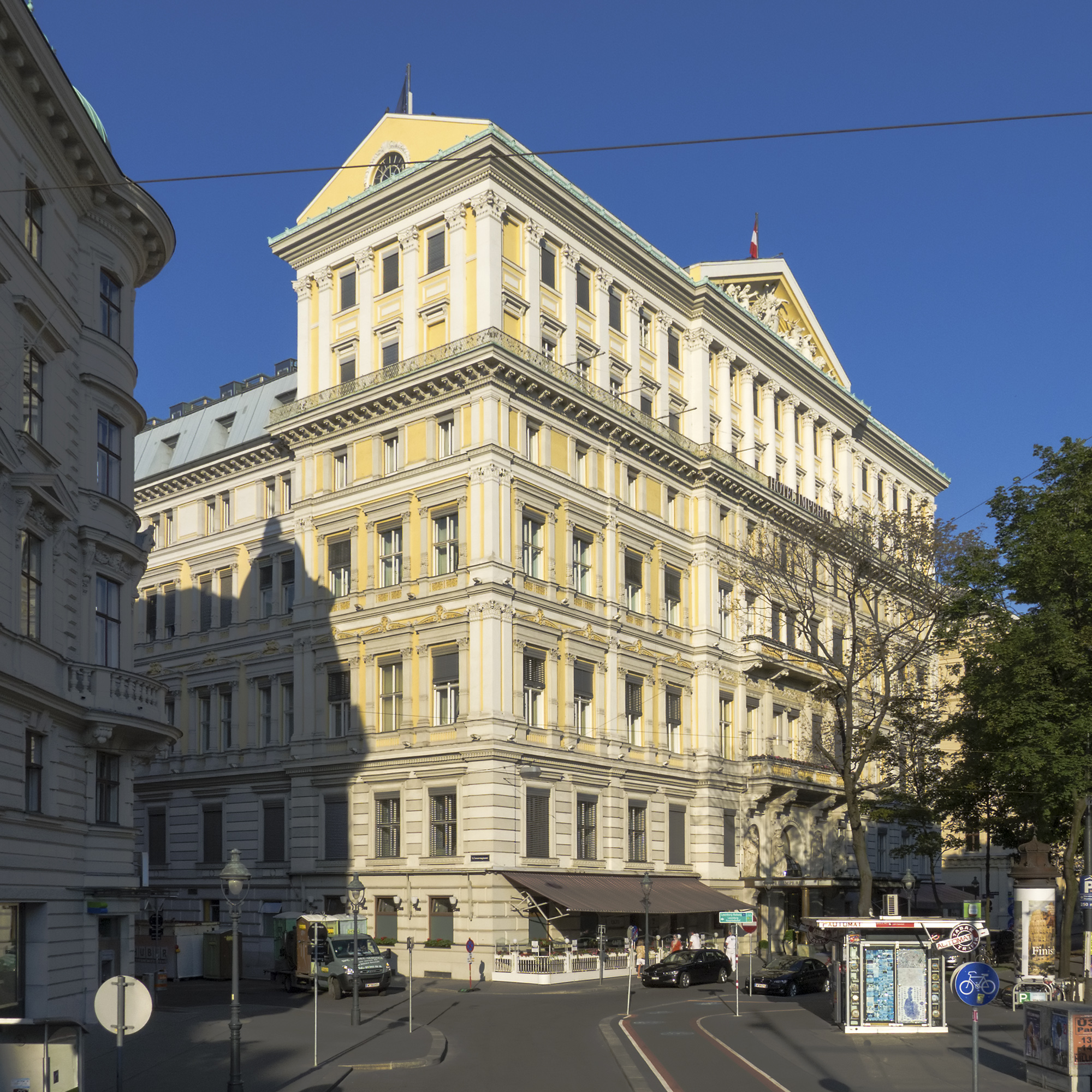
Hotel Imperial in Vienna where the government was seated.

The Bulgarian National Government-in-exile (Bulgarian: Българско национално правителство в изгнание, Balgarsko natsionalno pravitelstvo v izgnanie) was a right-wing Bulgarian government-in-exile after the monarchist government of Bulgaria was deposed in a communist backed coup d'état on September 9, 1944, and was replaced by the communist Fatherland Front, which later formed the People's Republic of Bulgaria. The Bulgarian government in exile had very little support among Bulgarians and formally oversaw Bulgarian troops loyal to the Germans. It was dissolved in May 1945, and its prime minister, the Bulgarian nationalist Aleksandar Tsankov, fled to Argentina.

== History ==
On September 16, 1944, the right-wing leader Aleksandar Tsankov made a radio announcement stating that: "The fight for the liberation of Bulgaria from the Jewish-Bolshevik yoke is in secure hands. The Bulgarian National government calls on fight against the oppressors of our motherland". However, the Bulgarian government-in-exile under Tsankov had no international recognition. On 13 November 1944, the government worked with the Waffen-SS to create a Bulgarian volunteer unit. This formation was known as the Bulgarian Grenadier Regiment and was planned to be expanded to a division. In February 1945 the Bulgarian Government moved from Vienna to Altaussee and soon after dissolved, in May. After the Second World War Tsankov fled to Argentina and died in Belgrano, Buenos Aires, in 1959.

== Government and politics ==
=== Ministers ===
Members of the government:

- Aleksandar Tsankov, Prime Minister
- Assen Kantardzhiev, Minister of the Interior
- Assen Tsankov, Minister of Foreign Affairs
- Hristo Statev, Minister of Education and Propaganda
- Ivan Rogozarov, Minister of Finance and Labor
- Nikola Kostov, minister without portfolio

== See also ==
- Kingdom of Bulgaria
- Bulgarian coup d'état of 1944
