= Church of the Nativity of the Theotokos, Skopje =

Eastern Orthodox church in North Macedonia

Coordinates: 41°59′46″N 21°26′22″E

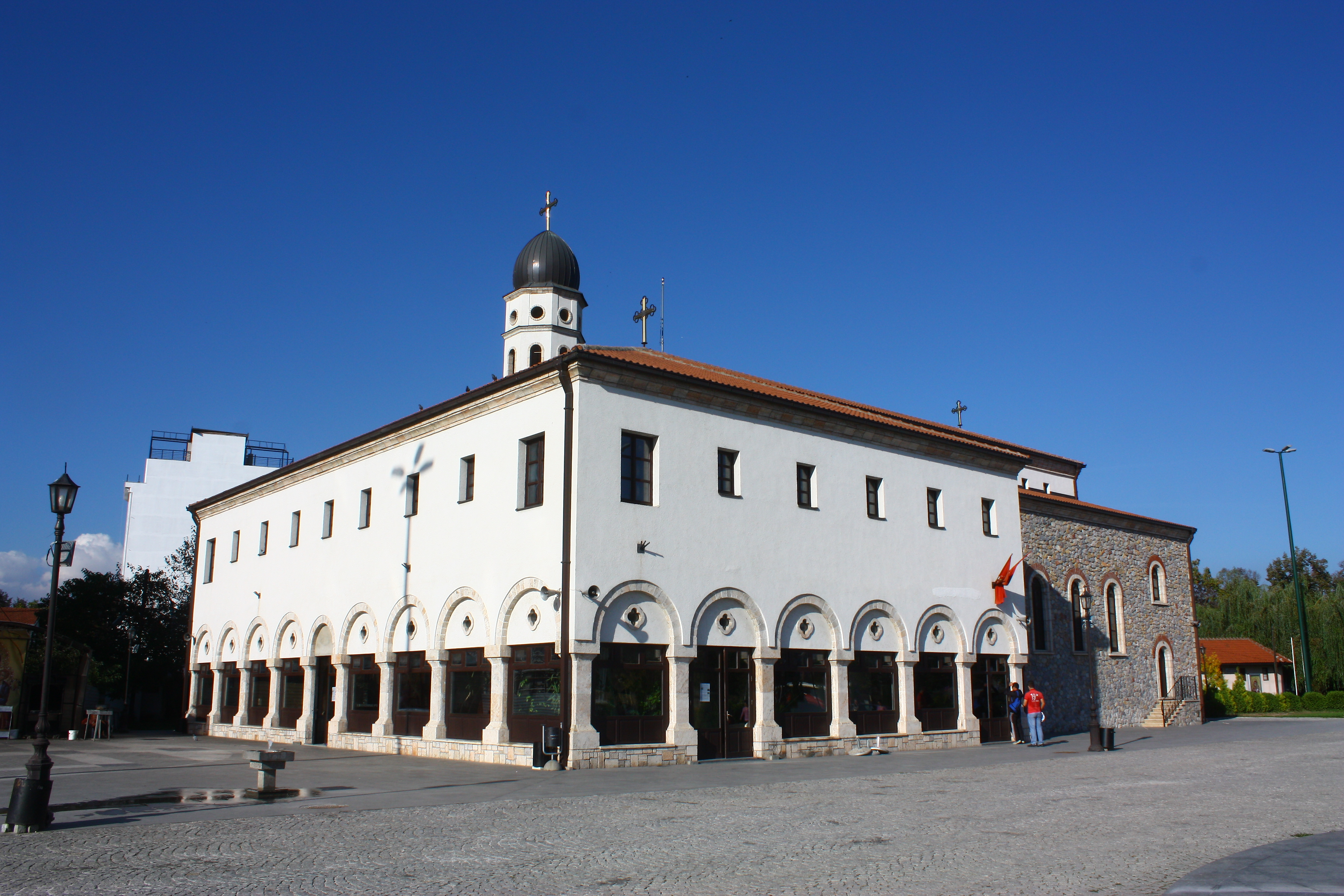
Church of the Nativity of the Theotokos, Skopje

The Church of the Nativity of the Theotokos or Church of the Nativity of the Blessed Virgin Mary (Macedonian: Црква „Рождество на Пресвета Богородица“, romanized: Crkva "Roždestvo na Presveta Bogorodica") is an Eastern Orthodox church in Skopje, North Macedonia.

== History ==
According to the legends, there was a medieval church. During the early 19th century, the locals in Skopje decided to build a new church. The project had become possible because the Ottoman building law, which had once limited the construction or renovation of Christian churches, had been changed. The construction works began in 1809 under the direction of the builder and painter Damjan Jankulov. He died during the construction period and the church was completed by his sons, led by Andrey Damyanov. On May 1, 1835, it was consecrated to the birth of the Blessed Virgin. The church is a three-aisled stone basilica with a western extension. The iconostasis is decorated with marble and wood carvings.

One year after the completion of the church, a convent school teaching in Bulgarian was built in its courtyard. Around 1850, the school was converted according to the Lancasterian system and 1895 it was transformed into Bulgarian Pedagogical School of Skopje. According to a Firman issued by the Sultan Abdülaziz on February 28, 1870, after a plebiscite of the Slavic population of Skopje, the first bishop of the Bulgarian Orthodox Diocese of Skopje was appointed in 1874. The Diocese eventually became part of the Bulgarian Orthodox Church. The Church of Our Lady became its local seat. After the incorporation of Skopje in 1912 in Serbia, the church was subordinated to the Serbian Orthodox Church. During Bulgarian occupation of the area in the First and in the Second World War the church was subordinated again to the BOC.

The church was affected by a fire during an Allied bombing raid on April 6, 1944. According to other report, the incident was triggered by accident by the cook of a German military unit stationed in the service premises of the church. Part of the church plate was brought out of the burning building and was subsequently taken over by the Bulgarian church authorities. During the bombing, a number of properties of the BOC's Skopje diocese were seriously damaged. According to the Macedonian historiographical data the church was burned up allegedly by the Bulgarian "fascistic occupiers".

In 2018, a report and a photograph of preserved slab appeared in Macedonian media. On the slab was an inscription: "The Main Door of the Bulgarian People's Church of the Nativity of the Holy Virgin, July 20, 1879." The report has revealed that the slab was mounted on the church itself, but later was removed and kept for years in a secret place, as not to be destroyed by the Yugoslav authorities.

== Sources ==
- Јов. Хаџи Василевић, Црква Света Богородица у Скопљу (1835–1935), “Споменица православног храма Свете Богородице у Скопљу 1835-1935 год.”, Скопље 1935.
- Васил Кънчов, Град Скопие. Бележки за неговото настояще и минало (Избрани произведения, т. II, Издателство Наука и изкуство, София 1970)

== See also ==
- Bulgarian Exarchate
