= Konstantin Muraviev =

Bulgarian politician

- Константин Муравиев
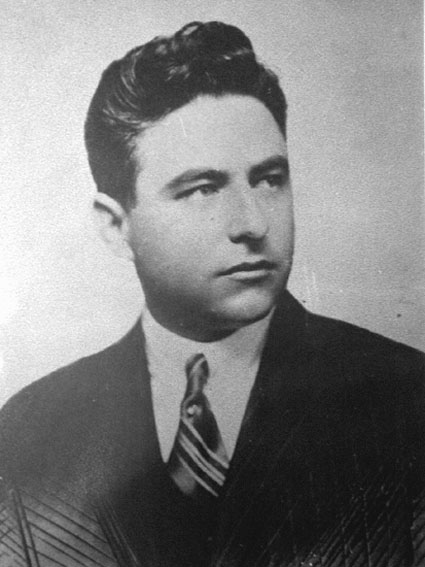

31st Prime Minister of Bulgaria
- In office 2 September 1944 – 9 September 1944
- Monarch: Simeon II
- Preceded by: Ivan Bagryanov
- Succeeded by: Kimon Georgiev

Personal details
- Born: 5 March 1893 Pazardzhik, Bulgarian Kingdom
- Died: 31 January 1965 (aged 71) Sofia, People's Republic of Bulgaria
- Resting place: Central Sofia Cemetery; 42°42′51.7″N 023°19′56.6″E
- Party: BANU Vrabcha 1

Konstantin Vladov Muraviev (Bulgarian: Константин Владов Муравиев; 5 March 1893 – 31 January 1965) was a leading member of the Agrarian People's Union who briefly served as Prime Minister of Bulgaria near the end of Bulgaria's involvement in the Second World War on the side of Germany.

== Early career ==
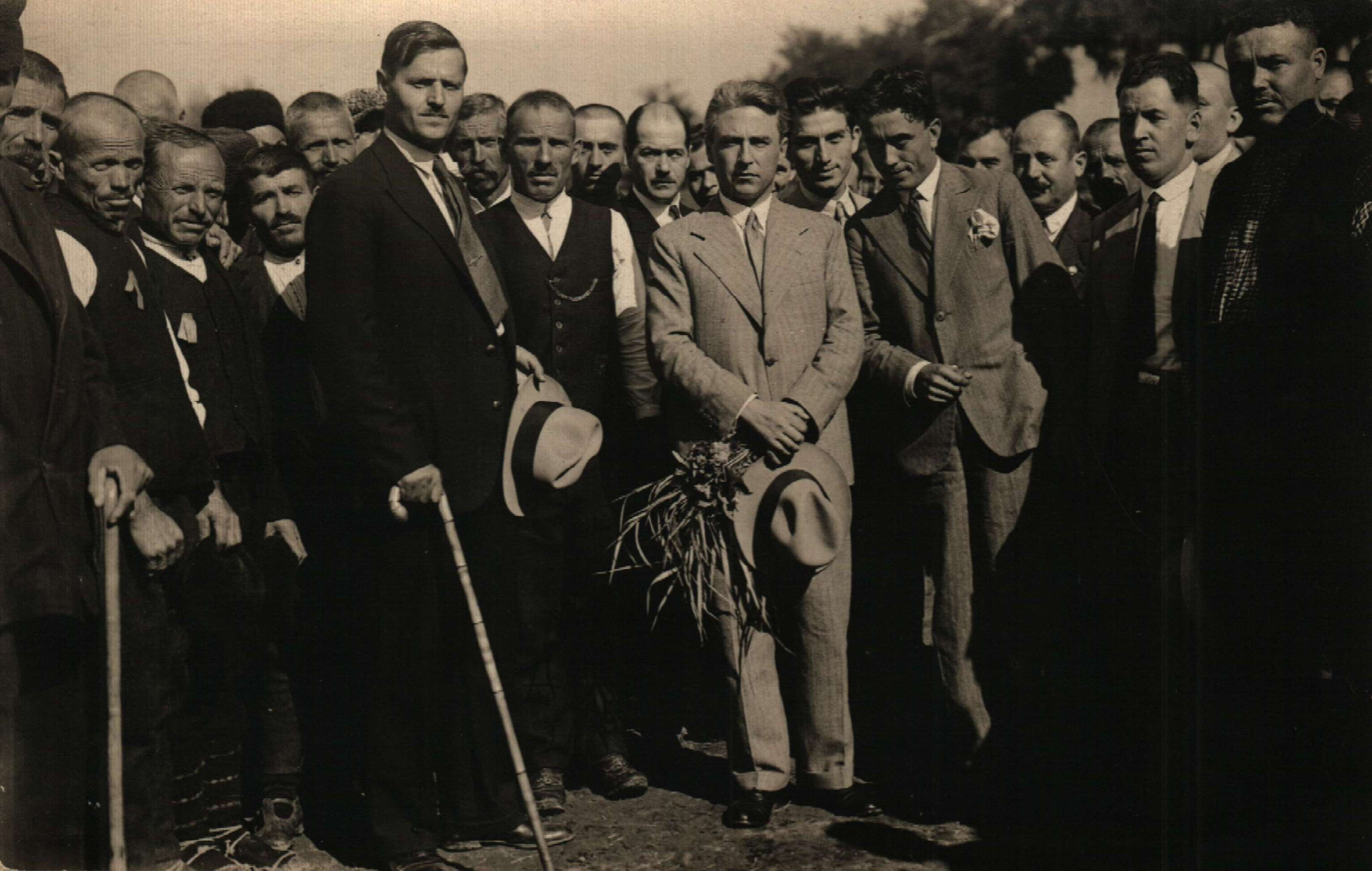
Muraviev with sympathizers, the 1930s

The nephew of Aleksandar Stamboliyski, he was appointed Minister of War under his uncle when aged only 29, although he proved unsuccessful in the post, with his refusal to acknowledge threats of a coup a major factor in the collapse of Stamboliyski's government in 1923. He would hold several other cabinet posts in coalition governments between 1931 and 1934 and his assured performances in these role rehabilitated his political reputation.

== Prime minister ==
During the Second World War he became one of the most prominent leaders of the legal opposition within parliament. However, on 2 September 1944 Muraviev was chosen by the Regency as Prime Minister in order to appeal to the Western Allies after they had rejected the advances of his predecessor Ivan Bagryanov. Muraviev ratified the abolition of all laws against Jews on 5 September.

The cabinet included no members of either the Fatherland Front or the left wing of the Agrarian Party, making it wholly unacceptable to Moscow. Muraviev had made overtures to the Fatherland Front although he was rebuffed as by this point they felt ready to establish their own government, rather than act as junior partners. His refusal to declare war on Germany further alienated him from the Soviets, although for his part Muraviev feared that a declaration of war would offer the USSR the pretext for an occupation of Bulgaria, ostensibly as the defence of an ally.

Faced with a series of strikes he broke relations with Germany on 5 September but, on the advice of his War Minister General Ivan Marinov, did not declare war in order to allow Bulgarian troops to evacuate Yugoslavia first. The scheme failed however as the Soviet Union promptly declared war on Bulgaria and, by the time Muraviev did likewise against Germany on 8 September it was too late. After just over a week in the job, his government was overthrown by the coup of 9 September 1944 initiated by the Fatherland Front as the Red Army advanced into the country. Although he had made overtures to the Allies throughout his brief Premiership the Soviet Union had refused to negotiate with him and his efforts had failed. Muraviev's efforts had also been damaged by the fact that General Marinov had secretly been in contact with the Fatherland Front throughout and had been largely acting on their behalf.

== Post-war ==
Unlike many of his contemporaries, Muraviev was not executed after the war, albeit he received a life sentence and was imprisoned until 1955. In 1956, he was re-arrested and imprisoned until 1961. Upon his release, Muraviev largely resigned himself to the new situation and in 1961 even held a series of discussions with Georgi Traykov, something for which he was condemned by his former colleagues on the right of the Agrarian Union.

He published a book on Bulgarian politics, Sаbitiya i hora (Събития и хора (Events and people)), in 1963.

== See also ==
- Bulgarian coup d'état of 1944

Political offices
Preceded by Ivan Bagryanov	Prime Minister of Bulgaria; 1944	Succeeded by Kimon Georgiev
Preceded by Aleksandar Stamboliyski	Minister of War of Bulgaria; 1923	Succeeded by Aleksandar Tsankov
Preceded by Parvan Draganov	Minister of Foreign Affairs of Bulgaria; 1944	Succeeded by Petko Staynov
