= List of heads of state of Bulgaria =

This is a list of the heads of the modern Bulgarian state, from the establishment of the Principality of Bulgaria to the present day.

It also lists the general secretaries of the Bulgarian Communist Party in 1948–1990. From 1948 onwards, the general secretary was the country's de facto chief executive.

== Principality of Bulgaria (1878–1908) ==
Prince		Reign			House	Claim
Portrait	Name (Birth–Death)	Reign start	Reign end	Duration	House	Claim
	Alexander I Александър I 1857–1893 (Lived: 36 years)	29 April 1879	7 September 1886 (Abdicated)	7 years, 131 days	Battenberg	Elected by the First Grand National Assembly
	Ferdinand I Фердинанд I 1861–1948 (Lived: 87 years)	7 July 1887	5 October 1908	21 years, 90 days	Saxe-Coburg and Gotha-Koháry	Elected by the Third Grand National Assembly

== Kingdom of Bulgaria (1908–1946) ==
Denotes Regent

Tsar		Reign			House	Claim
Portrait	Name (Birth–Death)	Reign start	Reign end	Duration	House	Claim
	Ferdinand I Фердинанд I 1861–1948 (Lived: 87 years)	5 October 1908	3 October 1918 (Abdicated)	9 years, 363 days	Saxe-Coburg and Gotha-Koháry	Proclaimed himself as Tsar
	Boris III; Борис III; 1894–1943 (Lived: 49 years)	3 October 1918	28 August 1943 (Died)	24 years, 329 days	Saxe-Coburg and Gotha-Koháry	Son of Ferdinand I
	Simeon II; Симеон II; Born 1937 (89 years old)	28 August 1943	15 September 1946 (Monarchy abolished)	3 years, 18 days	Saxe-Coburg and Gotha-Koháry	Son of Boris III
	Kiril, Prince of Preslav; Кирил, принц Преславски; 1895–1945 (Lived: 49 years)	28 August 1943	9 September 1944 (Deposed)	1 year, 12 days	Saxe-Coburg and Gotha-Koháry	First Regency Council; For Simeon II
	Bogdan Filov; Богдан Филов; 1883–1945 (Lived: 61 years)	28 August 1943	9 September 1944 (Deposed)	1 year, 12 days	—	First Regency Council; For Simeon II
	Lt. General; Nikola Mihov; Никола Михов; 1891–1945 (Lived: 53 years)	28 August 1943	9 September 1944 (Deposed)	1 year, 12 days	—	First Regency Council; For Simeon II
	Todor Pavlov; Тодор Павлов; 1890–1977 (Lived: 87 years)	9 September 1944	15 September 1946 (Monarchy abolished)	2 years, 6 days	—	Second Regency Council; For Simeon II
	Venelin Ganev; Венелин Ганев; 1880–1966 (Lived: 86 years)	9 September 1944	15 September 1946 (Monarchy abolished)	2 years, 6 days	—	Second Regency Council; For Simeon II
	Tsvetko Boboshevski; Цвятко Бобошевски; 1884–1952 (Lived: 68 years)	9 September 1944	15 September 1946 (Monarchy abolished)	2 years, 6 days	—	Second Regency Council; For Simeon II

== People's Republic of Bulgaria (1946–1990) ==
Status

Denotes Acting Head of State

Head of State		Term of office			Duration	Political party
Portrait	Name (Birth–Death)	Election	Took office	Left office	Duration	Political party
Chairman of the Provisional Presidency
	Vasil Kolarov; Васил Коларов; 1877–1950 (Lived: 72 years)	—	15 September 1946	9 December 1947	1 year, 85 days	BKP
Chairman of the Presidium of the National Assembly
	Mincho Neychev; Минчо Нейчев; 1887–1956 (Lived: 69 years)	—	9 December 1947	27 May 1950	2 years, 169 days	BKP
	Georgi Damyanov; Георги Дамянов; 1892–1958 (Lived: 66 years)	—	27 May 1950	27 November 1958†	8 years, 184 days	BKP
	Georgi Kulishev; Георги Кулишев; 1885–1974 (Lived: 89 years)	—	27 November 1958	30 November 1958	3 days	BKP
	Nikolay Georgiev; Николай Георгиев; 1906–1987 (Lived: 81 years)	—	27 November 1958	30 November 1958	3 days	BZNS
	Dimitar Ganev; Димитър Ганев; 1898–1964 (Lived: 65 years)	—	30 November 1958	20 April 1964†	5 years, 142 days	BKP
	Georgi Kulishev; Георги Кулишев; 1885–1974 (Lived: 89 years)	—	20 April 1964	23 April 1964	3 days	BKP
	Nikolay Georgiev; Николай Георгиев; 1906–1987 (Lived: 81 years)	—	20 April 1964	23 April 1964	3 days	BZNS
	Georgi Traykov; Георги Трайков; 1898–1975 (Lived: 76 years)	—	23 April 1964	7 July 1971	7 years, 75 days	BZNS
Chairman of the State Council
	Todor Zhivkov; Тодор Живков; 1911–1998 (Lived: 86 years)	—	7 July 1971	17 November 1989	18 years, 133 days	BKP
	Petar Mladenov; Петър Младенов; 1936–2000 (Lived: 63 years)	—	17 November 1989	3 April 1990	137 days	BKP
Chairman (President) of the Republic
	Petar Mladenov; Петър Младенов; 1936–2000 (Lived: 63 years)	(Apr) 1990	3 April 1990	6 July 1990	94 days	BSP
	Stanko Todorov; Станко Тодоров; 1920–1996 (Lived: 76 years)	—	6 July 1990	17 July 1990	11 days	BSP
	Nikolai Todorov; Николай Тодоров; 1921–2003 (Lived: 82 years)	—	17 July 1990	1 August 1990	15 days	Independent
	Zhelyu Zhelev; Желю Желев; 1935–2015 (Lived: 79 years)	(Jul–Aug) 1990	1 August 1990	15 November 1990	106 days	SDS

=== General Secretaries of the Bulgarian Communist Party (1948–1990) ===
General Secretary		Term of office			Notes
Portrait	Name (Birth–Death)	Took office	Left office	Duration	Notes
	Georgi Dimitrov; Георги Димитров; 1882–1949 (Lived: 67 years)	27 December 1948	2 July 1949	187 days	Also Prime Minister (1946–1949)
	Valko Chervenkov; Вълко Червенков; 1900–1980 (Lived: 80 years)	2 July 1949	4 March 1954	4 years, 245 days	Also Prime Minister (1950–1956)
	Todor Zhivkov; Тодор Живков; 1911–1998 (Lived: 86 years)	4 March 1954	10 November 1989	35 years, 251 days	Also Prime Minister (1962–1971), and Chairman of the Council of State (1971–1989)
	Petar Mladenov; Петър Младенов; 1936–2000 (Lived: 63 years)	10 November 1989	2 February 1990	84 days	Also Chairman of the Council of State (1989–1990)

== Republic of Bulgaria (1990–present) ==
President		Term of office			Duration	Political party
Portrait	Name (Birth–Death)	Election	Took office	Left office	Duration	Political party
Chairman (President) of the Republic
	Zhelyu Zhelev; Желю Желев; 1935–2015 (Lived: 79 years)	(Jul-Aug) 1990	15 November 1990	22 January 1992	1 year, 68 days	SDS
President of the Republic
	Zhelyu Zhelev; Желю Желев; 1935–2015 (Lived: 79 years)	1992	22 January 1992	22 January 1997	5 years	SDS
	Petar Stoyanov; Петър Стоянов; Born 1952 (74 years old)	1996	22 January 1997	22 January 2002	5 years	SDS
	Georgi Parvanov; Георги Първанов; Born 1957 (69 years old)	2001; 2006	22 January 2002	22 January 2012	10 years	BSP
	Rosen Plevneliev; Росен Плевнелиев; Born 1964 (62 years old)	2011	22 January 2012	22 January 2017	5 years	GERB
	Rumen Radev; Румен Радев; Born 1963 (63 years old)	2016; 2021	22 January 2017	23 January 2026	9 years, 1 day	Independent (BSP–nominated)
	Iliana Iotova; Илияна Йотова; Born 1964 (62 years old)	— 2026	23 January 2026	Incumbent	283 days	Independent (PB, BSP–nominated)

== Head of state titles ==
State	Years	Title
Principality of Bulgaria	1879–1908	Prince of Bulgaria
Tsardom of Bulgaria	1908–1946	Tsar of Bulgaria
People's Republic of Bulgaria	1946–1947	Chairman of the Provisional; Presidency
People's Republic of Bulgaria	1947–1971	Chairman of the Presidium of the National Assembly
People's Republic of Bulgaria	1971–1990	Chairman of the State; Council
People's Republic of Bulgaria	1990	Chairman (President) of the Republic
Republic of Bulgaria	1990–1992	Chairman (President) of the Republic
Republic of Bulgaria	1992–present	President of the Republic

== See also ==
- Politics of Bulgaria
- List of Bulgarian monarchs
- List of Bulgarian regents
- List of heads of government of Bulgaria
- List of first deputy chairmen of the State Council of Bulgaria
- Vice President of Bulgaria
