= Prince regent =

Prince who rules in place of a monarch due to incapacity or absence

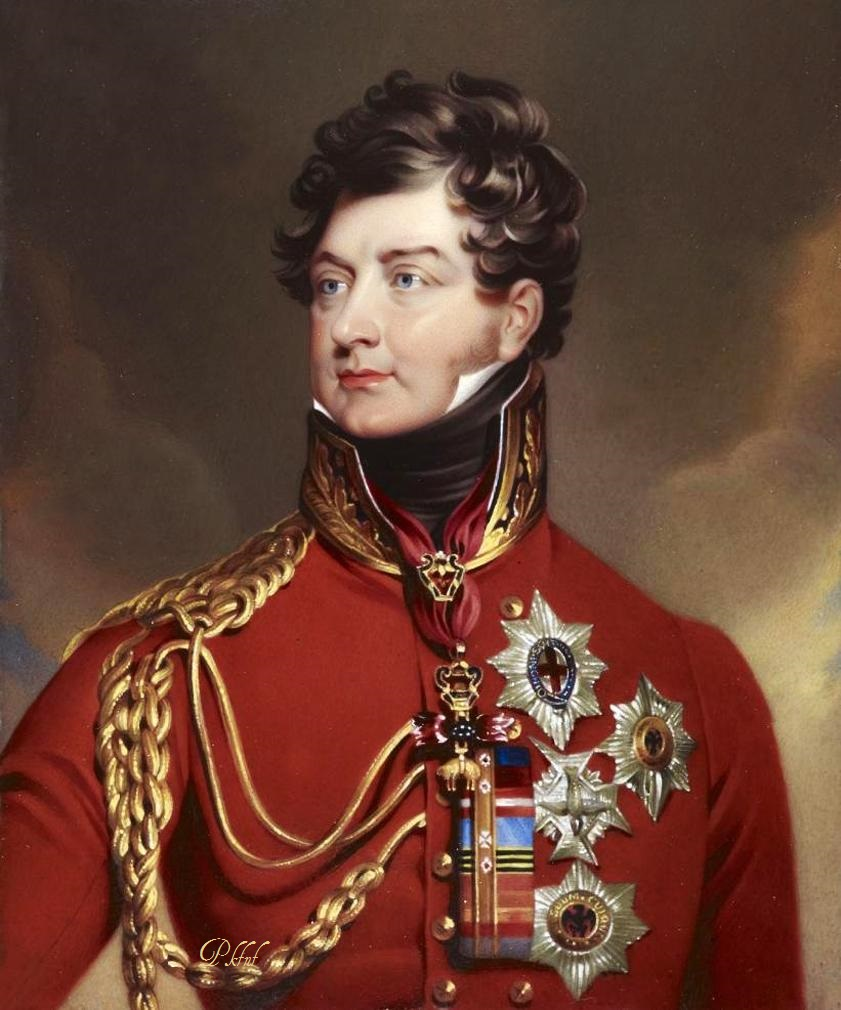
George IV of the United Kingdom, as prince regent, while his father was mentally incapable between 1811 and 1820. By Henry Bone.

A prince regent or princess regent is a prince or princess who serves as regent in the stead of a monarch who is a minor, incapacitated, or otherwise absent, whether by remoteness, such as exile or a long voyage, or the absence of an incumbent. The term may be used generically for any prince or princess acting in such a capacity, but historically it has been applied most prominently to certain regents in European monarchies.

== Prince Regent of the United Kingdom ==
In the English language, the title Prince Regent is most commonly associated with George IV of the United Kingdom and Hanover, who held the style His Royal Highness The Prince Regent during the Regency period (1811–1820), owing to the incapacity (by dint of mental illness) of his father, George III, in the final years of his life. Regent's Park, Regent Street and Regent's Canal in London were commissioned by the Prince Regent and named in his honour. Under his patronage, the architect John Nash developed a palatial summer residence for the prince, 50 detached villas in a parkland setting and elegant terraces around the exterior of the park. This was all part of an ambitious plan to develop The Regent's Park and lay out an elegant new street, Regent's Street, to link it to St James's Park and the prince's London residence, Carlton House. Regent Terrace in Edinburgh is also named after the Prince Regent, who visited the area in 1822.

The title was formally conferred by the Regency Act on 5 February 1811. Subject to certain limitations for a period, the prince regent was able to exercise the full powers of the King. The precedent of the Regency Crisis of 1788—during which George III recovered before it was necessary to appoint a regent—was followed. The Prince of Wales continued as regent until his father's death in 1820, when he succeeded as George IV.

== Prince regent in Germany ==
In Germany, the title Prinzregent (literally prince regent) is most commonly associated with Luitpold, Prince Regent of Bavaria, who served as regent from 1886 to 1912. Luitpold assumed the regency after his nephew Ludwig II of Bavaria was declared mentally unfit to rule in 1886. Following Ludwig II’s death shortly thereafter, Luitpold continued as regent for another nephew, Otto, who had been declared mentally ill in 1875. The period of Luitpold’s regency is often referred to in Bavaria as the Prinzregentenjahre or the Prinzregentenzeit. This era was associated with significant artistic and cultural development, particularly in Munich. Numerous streets, including Prinzregentenstraße in Munich, and institutions such as the Prinzregententheater in Munich were named in his honour. The Bavarian Prinzregententorte, a multi-layered cake with chocolate butter cream, is also named in Luitpold's honour.

Upon Luitpold's death in 1912, his son Prince Ludwig succeeded him as regent. In November 1913, the Bavarian constitution was amended by the Legislature to permit the regent to assume the crown after Otto's prolonged incapacity, whereupon Ludwig was proclaimed Ludwig III.

== Prince regent in Belgium ==
- Belgium’s first head of state following its independence from the United Kingdom of the Netherlands in 1830 was the regent Baron Érasme-Louis Surlet de Chokier, who served from February to July 1831 pending the accession of Leopold I after Belgium chose to become a constitutional monarchy.
- Prince Charles, Count of Flanders served as prince regent from 1944 to 1950 during the German captivity and exile to Switzerland of his elder brother, King Leopold III, following the German occupation of Belgium in the Second World War. His regency took place amid intense political controversy—known as the Royal Question—regarding Leopold III’s conduct during the war and his suitability to resume his duties as King.
- The Royal Question culminated in the 1950 Belgian monarchy referendum, wherein the Belgian public narrowly voted for King Leopold III to return from Switzerland. Despite Leopold's return on 22 July, parliamentary dissent and public protests forced Leopold to end his reign. Leopold first delegated his authority as King to Prince Baudouin, Duke of Brabant on 11 August 1950, making him prince regent. Secondly, Leopold abdicated in favour of Baudouin on 16 July 1951, who took the oath of office as King of the Belgians on 17 July.

== Prince regent in Bulgaria ==
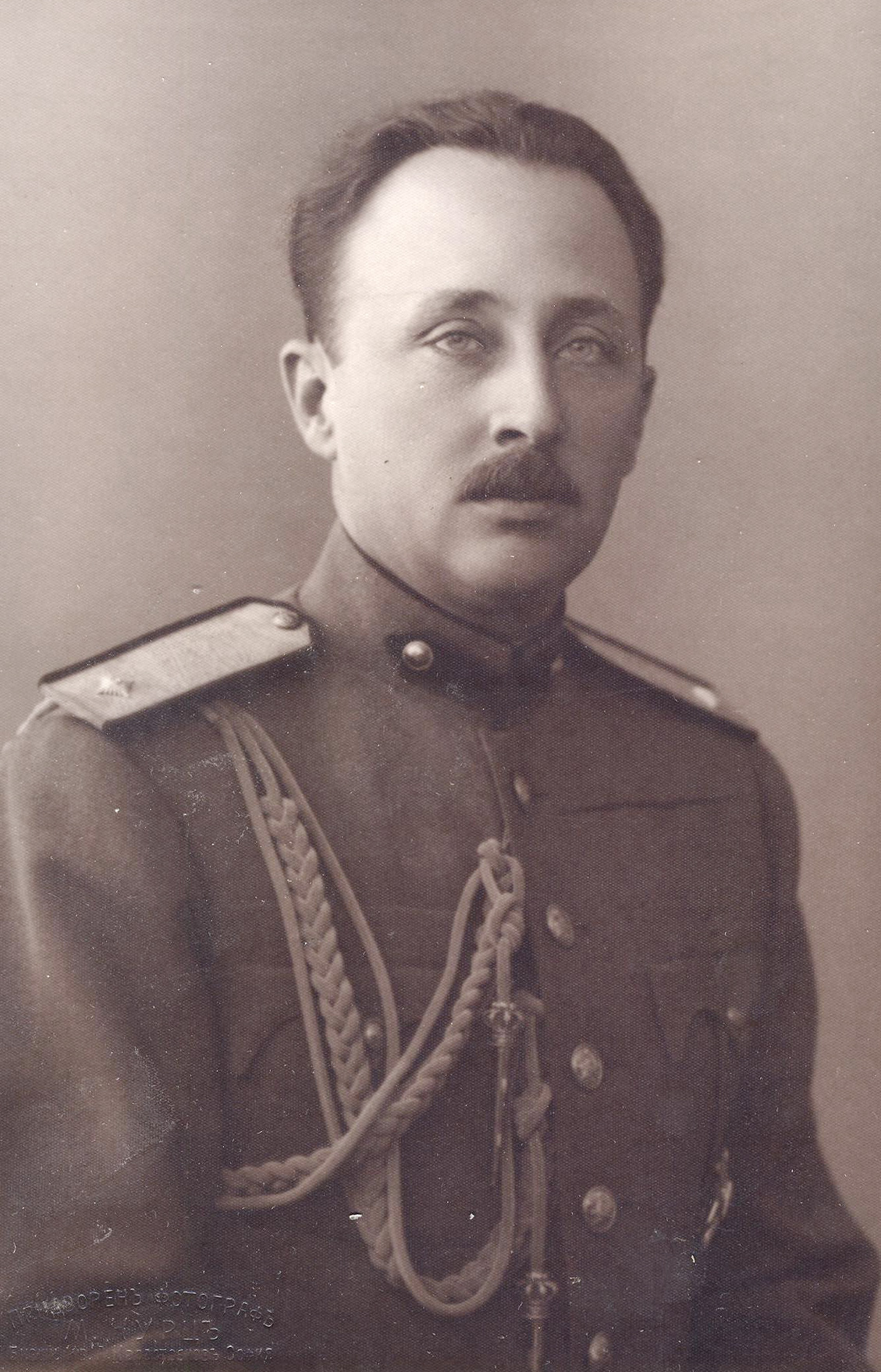
The Prince Regent Kyril, Prince of Preslav

Following the sudden death of Tsar Boris III on 28 August 1943, his six-year-old son Simeon II succeeded to the throne. A regency triumvirate, headed by Kiril, Prince of Preslav, brother of Tsar Boris, was appointed by the Bulgarian parliament to exercise the powers of the crown until the tsar reached his majority.

On 5 September 1944 the Soviet Union declared war on Bulgaria, and on 8 September Red Army forces entered the country. Shortly thereafter, a new government backed by the pro-Soviet Fatherland Front movement assumed power, through a coup d'état.

On 1 February 1945, Prince Kiril and the other regents, Bogdan Filov and General Nikola Mikhov, were tried by the so-called People's Court and executed, along with numerous former ministers, members of parliament, and royal advisers.

== Lieutenant-representative in Luxembourg ==
In Luxembourg, the heir apparent or heir presumptive to the grand duke may be appointed lieutenant-representative (French: lieutenant-représentant) during a period in which the reigning grand duke formally retains the throne but delegates to their heir the exercise of most constitutional powers. This has been customary since the reign of Grand Duchess Charlotte:

- Hereditary Grand Duke Jean was appointed prince-lieutenant on 4 May 1961 and exercised the functions of head of state during the final years of the reign of his mother, Grand Duchess Charlotte, until her abdication on 12 November 1964, when he succeeded as Grand Duke.
- Hereditary Grand Duke Henri was appointed prince-lieutenant on 4 March 1998 and carried out the duties of the crown until the abdication of his father, Grand Duke Jean, on 7 October 2000, upon which he succeeded as Grand Duke.
- Hereditary Grand Duke Guillaume was appointed prince-lieutenant on 8 October 2024 and exercised the authority of the crown until his father, Grand Duke Henri, abdicated on 3 October 2025, whereupon Guillaume acceded as Guillaume V.

== Prince regent in Liechtenstein ==
Under the Constitution of Liechtenstein, the reigning prince may appoint the heir apparent as regent to exercise the powers of the crown. The regent exercises the constitutional functions of the prince, including assent to legislation and representation of the state.

This provision has been used on multiple occasions in the twentieth and twenty-first centuries:

- In 1938, Sovereign Prince Franz appointed his grandnephew and heir Franz Joseph regent due to the Anschluss of Austria. Franz Joseph succeeded as Franz Joseph II later that year.
- In 1984, Franz Joseph II appointed his son and heir apparent Hereditary Prince Hans-Adam as regent, transferring to him the exercise of his sovereign authority. Hans-Adam succeeded as Hans-Adam II upon his father's death in 1989.
- On 15 August 2004, Hans-Adam II in turn formally transferred the exercise of his sovereign powers to his son and heir apparent, Alois, Hereditary Prince of Liechtenstein, who has since served as regent while Hans-Adam II remains head of state.

== Other notable princes and princesses regent ==
More prince-regents (often without such specific title) are to be found in List of regents.

- Duke of Zhou Dan served as prince regent for his nephew King Cheng of Zhou until the latter came of age.
- Tiberius Constantine served as regent for his mentally incapacitated adoptive father Justin II whilst holding the rank of Caesar (574–578).
- Philippe II, Duke of Orléans was Regent of France from the death of Louis XIV in 1715 until Louis XV came of age in 1723; this is also used as a period label for many aspects of French history, as "Régence" in French.
- Te Wherowhero Tawhiao, younger brother of Māori King Mahuta Tāwhiao, served as Whirinaki-a-te-Kiingi (Prince Regent) for his brother from 1903 to 1910. This was because Mahuta Tāwhiao spent this period of his reign as a member of the Legislative Council.
- Crown Prince Frederick of Denmark served as regent from 1784 to 1808 for his father, King Christian VII of Denmark, who was insane and mentally unfit to rule.
- Prince William of Prussia served as regent from 1858 to 1861 for his older brother King Frederick William IV of Prussia, who had become mentally unfit to rule.
- Prince Dorgon of the early Qing dynasty served as regent for his nephew, the Shunzhi Emperor, from 1643 to 1650, because the latter was only six at the time of his ascension. Dorgon was instrumental in moving Manchu forces into Beijing in 1644, proclaiming the Qing dynasty to be the legitimate successor to the Ming dynasty. In Qing dynasty historical records, Dorgon was the first to be referred to as Shezhengwang (摄政王; "Prince regent").
- Rameses the Great
- Prince Chun of the late Qing dynasty served as regent from 1908 to 1911 for his son Puyi, the Xuantong Emperor. Apart from Dorgon, Zaifeng was the only person in Chinese history who was specifically referred to as prince regent.
- Crown Prince Hirohito served as regent from 1921 to 1926 for his ailing father, Emperor Taishō.
- Prince Paul of Yugoslavia from 1934 to 1941, known in Serbian as Његово Краљевско Височанство, Кнез Намесник (English: His Royal Highness The Prince Regent) served as regent for his first cousin once removed, King Peter II who was a minor. His regency was overthrown in 1941, after he allied the Kingdom with the Axis powers in World War II.
- Alexander I Karađorđević, Crown Prince of Serbia and Yugoslavia, who served as Regent of the Kingdom of Serbia from 1914 to 1918, and of the Kingdom of the Serbs, Croats and Slovennes from 1918 to 1921 for his father, King Peter I, who transferred his rule as his health declined due to old age. His regency was associated with the participation of Serbia in World War I.
- John, Prince of Brazil (1767–1826) served as regent of Portugal for his mother Queen Maria I, who had become mentally unfit to rule, from 1799 to 1816. His regency was associated with the political chaos of Portugal during the Napoleonic Wars, which led to the transfer of the Portuguese court to Brazil.
- Princess Erelu Kuti of Lagos, a Yoruba chieftess of the eighteenth century who served as queen mother of a line of tribal kings. The successors to the noble title that now shares her name have all subsequently served as regent of Lagos following the death of a reigning oba. Princesses are traditionally called upon to serve as regents in this fashion in most of the other kingdoms of Yorubaland as well. In Akure, for example, the eldest daughter of a recently deceased king ruled in his stead until a substantive successor to the royal title was chosen by the college of noble kingmakers, a period that lasted for an unusually long six years due to a succession crisis in the state.
- Chief Tshekedi Khama of the Bamangwato, a Tswana prince who served as regent during the reign of his famous nephew, Sir Seretse Khama. He opposed Sir Seretse's marriage to Lady Khama on the grounds that it would have an adverse effect on the chieftaincy, and attempted to claim the tribal throne in his stead thereafter because of it. He was ultimately unsuccessful.
- Anne of France served as a regent of France for her younger brother, King Charles VIII, between 1483-1491.
- Sophia Alekseyevna from 1682-1689 as regent of Russia on behalf of her younger brothers.
- Aurora Pinedo served as Princess Regent of the Afro-Bolivian monarchy from 1954-1992.
- Prince Nicholas of Romania served as a prince regent between 1927 and 1930 for his minor nephew, King Michael I of Romania. Nicholas' brother, King Carol II of Romania, had refused the throne of Romania since 1925, but in 1930, he came back, dethroning his own son.
