= List of Bulgarian regents =

This is a list of Bulgarian regents. A regent, from the Latin regens ("one who reigns"), is a person selected to act as head of state (ruling or not) because the ruler is a minor, not present, or debilitated.

== Middle Ages ==
Kavhan Isbul was regent after the death of Khan Omurtag, when his successor Khan Malamir was still a minor. He was also regent of Presiyan I, the minor nephew of Malamir.

On behalf of the infant king Кoloman I Asen (1241–1246), the country was ruled by a regency. When he died, a regency council led by Irina Komnina ruled on behalf of King Michael II Asen from 1246 to 1253.

A regency council on behalf of Ivan IV Smilets headed by his mother Smiltsena and despot Eltimir ruled from 1298 to 1299.

== Regents after Prince Alexander I ==
Stefan Stambolov, Sava Mutkurov and Petko Karavelov (replaced by Georgi Zhivkov) were regents after the abdication of Prince Alexander Battenberg in August 1886 until the election and inauguration of the new Prince Ferdinand I Saxe-Coburg-Gotha in August 1887.

== Regents for Tsar Simeon II ==
Regent		Term			Claim
Portrait	Name (Born–Died)	Term start	Term end	Duration	Claim
	Kiril, Prince of Preslav; 1895–1945 (Lived: 49 years)	28 August 1943	9 September 1944 (Deposed following a coup d'état)	1 year, 12 days	First Regency Council; For Simeon II
	Bogdan Filov; 1883–1945 (Lived: 61 years)	28 August 1943	9 September 1944 (Deposed following a coup d'état)	1 year, 12 days	First Regency Council; For Simeon II
	Lt. General Nikola Mihov; 1891–1945 (Lived: 53 years)	28 August 1943	9 September 1944 (Deposed following a coup d'état)	1 year, 12 days	First Regency Council; For Simeon II
	Todor Pavlov; 1890–1977 (Lived: 87 years)	9 September 1944	15 September 1946 (Monarchy abolished)	2 years, 6 days	Second Regency Council; For Simeon II
	Venelin Ganev; 1880–1966 (Lived: 86 years)	9 September 1944	15 September 1946 (Monarchy abolished)	2 years, 6 days	Second Regency Council; For Simeon II
	Tsvyatko Boboshevski; 1884–1952 (Lived: 68 years)	9 September 1944	15 September 1946 (Monarchy abolished)	2 years, 6 days	Second Regency Council; For Simeon II

== See also ==
- Regency
- List of regents
- List of heads of state of Bulgaria
- President of Bulgaria
- Prime Minister of Bulgaria
- Monarchy of Bulgaria
