= Ivan Marinov (general) =

Bulgarian military officer

- Иван Маринов
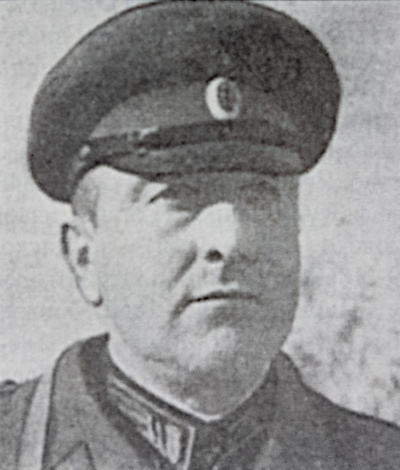

Minister of War of Bulgaria
- In office 2 September 1944 – 9 September 1944

Personal details
- Born: January 6, 1896 Gabrovo, Kingdom of Bulgaria
- Died: August 18, 1979 (aged 83) Sofia, Bulgarian People's Republic
- Resting place: Central Sofia Cemetery
- Education: National Military University

Military service
- Allegiance: Kingdom of Bulgaria
- Branch/service: Bulgarian Land Forces
- Rank: General
- Battles/wars: Balkan Wars, World War II

Ivan Krstev Marinov (Bulgarian: Иван Кръстев Маринов; 6 January 1896 – 18 August 1979) was a Bulgarian army general and politician who served as Minister of War of Bulgaria from 2 to 9 of September 1944.

== Biography ==
Ivan Marinov was born on January 6, 1896, in Sofia, the son of Major-General Krastyu Marinov and married to Zina Markova, niece of the Bulgarian communist Georgi Kirkov. He later divorced her. He took part in the Balkan Wars and Inter-Allied wars as a volunteer. During the First World War he was a pilot in aviation. During the hostilities, he met and became friends with the Bulgarian officer at the time, Lieutenant Ferdinand Kozovski, later a general and activist of the BKP. He served in the 15th Lom infantry regiment and the 21st border division. From the 1920s he began to sympathize with the communist movement, as a result of which he was one of the few Bulgarian officers who did not take part in the June 9, 1923 military coup to overthrow the Bulgarian Agrarian National Union government of Aleksandar Stamboliyski, supported by the Bulgarian Communist Party, as in the following years he secretly cooperated both with representatives of the Soviet Union in Bulgaria and with members of the Bulgarian Communist Party.

In 1921 he was brought to the Gendarmerie. In 1930, he graduated from the Military Academy and the same year was appointed to lead the material part of the mixed eagle. In the following year, he was appointed commander of the mixed eagle, after which he was the chief of staff of a division. In 1934 he was appointed Chief of the Air Technical Service and later that year was appointed Head of Classes at the Military School, and later that year was appointed Chief of the Intelligence Service at Army Headquarters. (8 July 1935 – 24 September 1936)

In 1934–1939, he was one of the influential members of the left of the Military Union and an accomplice of Kimon Georgiev in the anti-monarchist conspiracy of the union, and during the revelation of the Military Union conspiracy in 1935, Ivan Marinov remained undetected. In the period 1936–1939 he was the Bulgarian military attaché in Paris and London, after which, from August 15 to October 1, 1939, he was the chief of staff of the 3rd Army and is a member of the military union. In 1938, he was conscripted into Civil Mobilization. Head of its supply department until October 26, 1940. In 1940–1944, he was successively the commander of the Sixth Infantry Bdin Division (October 27, 1940 – June 17, 1942) and the Fifteenth Ohrid Infantry Division (June 17, 1942 – September 4, 1944), stationed in Vardar Macedonia during the Bulgarian rule (1941–1944).

Since 1943, General Ivan Marinov has not allowed trials against those suspected of anti-fascist and communist activities in the military units commanded by him, in 1943 he hid, both in Bitola and Ohrid, Jews who escaped from the military raids and (from September 1943) officers and soldiers of the Italian Armed Forces, after the signing of the Armistice of Cassibile between Italy and the anti-Hitler coalition and the declaration of war by Italy against Germany on 13 March 1943, which fact did not become known to the high command of the Wehrmacht in Serbia, nor did the Bulgarian government learn about it until September 9, 1944.

On September 2, 1944, he was appointed Minister of War of Bulgaria in Konstantin Muraviev's cabinet and arrived in Sofia two days later. Muraviev faced with a series of strikes he broke relations with Germany on 5 September but, on the advice of Marinov did not declare war in order to allow Bulgarian troops to evacuate Yugoslavia first.

After had secretly been in contact with the Fatherland Front in the preceding period and had been largely acting on their behalf., he participated in carrying out the September 9th coup, after which he was appointed commander-in-chief of the Bulgarian Armed Forces (1944) (as assistant commander-in-chief of the Bulgarian army was Ivan Marinov's old friend – General Ferdinand Kozovski) and remained in office until July 12, 1945. On November 18, 1944, he was promoted to the rank of lieutenant general. From 1945 he was chief inspector of the army, later that year he was chief of combat training and in 1946 he was dismissed from service.

Later, the senior communist functionary of that period, Georgi Chankov, noted that for his activities in Macedonia, including his role in the deportation of the Jews from Bitola, Marinov should have been tried by the so-called People's Court, but avoided this with the patronage of the Bulgarian Communist Party and personally of its leader Georgi Dimitrov, who is in Moscow.

Ivan Marinov was part of the Bulgarian delegation at the 1945 Soviet parade of Victory of the over Nazi Germany in Red Square, Moscow, held on June 24, 1945, where the Soviet leader Joseph Stalin personally awarded him the Order of Suvorov, 1st degree.

He served as the Bulgaria's minister plenipotentiary in Paris from 1946 to 1950. He served as a lecturer at the Georgi Rakovski Military Academy from 1950. In 1949 and 1954 he was taken under surveillance under the pseudonym "Diplomat" by Committee for State Security on suspicion of links with foreign intelligence, which was closed in 1960. In 1956–1979, he was a district councilor in the Levski District People's Council (Kirkovski RNS) – Sofia.

Political offices
Preceded by Rusi Rusev	Minister of War of Bulgaria; 2 September 1944 – 9 September 1944	Succeeded by Damyan Velchev
