= Evdokia Peteva-Filova =

Bulgarian ethnographer (1901 – 1972)

- Born: 21 March 1901; Shumen, Principality of Bulgaria
- Died: 5 March 1973 (aged 71); Sofia, People's Republic of Bulgaria
- Education: University of Würzburg
- Occupations: Ethnographer, Art historian
- Spouse: Bogdan Filov

Evdokia Vasilievna Petova-Filova (Bulgarian: Евдокия Василева Петева-Филова; 21 March 1901 – 5 March 1973) was a Bulgarian anthropologist and art historian.

== Career ==
After the 1944 Bulgarian coup d'état and the arrest of Bogdan Filov, their property was confiscated by the new authorities. She was expelled from the Ethnographic Museum, and in May 1945, she was imprisoned, first in Dulovo and later in Ruse and Lovech. In 1957, she was transferred to Samokov, where she lived for most of the remainder of her life.

For about a decade, she searched for original documents and archives about the Bulgarian Renaissance artist and icon painter Nikola Obrazopisov in Samokov and the region. Her book about Obrazopisov and his personality was published posthumously by the Bulgarian Academy of Sciences in 1994.
