= People's Court (Bulgaria) =

Special court of Communist Bulgaria

The People's Court (Bulgarian: Народен съд) was a special court of Communist Bulgaria, set up outside the operations of the constitutional frame of law. The court was established after the Bulgarian coup d'état of 1944.

The court verdicts started on 1 February 1945, sentencing to death, with no right of appeal, 3 regents, 8 royal advisors, 22 cabinet ministers, 67 MPs from the 24th Ordinary National Assembly of Bulgaria, and 47 generals and senior army officers. Overall, the Court tried 135 cases with 11,122 accused. A total of 9,155 people were sentenced. Of these 2,730 to death, and 1,305 to life sentences. It remains unknown how many executions were carried out.

In 1996, the Supreme Court of the Republic of Bulgaria repealed some of the People's Court sentences due to "lack of evidence". With decision 4/1998 the Constitutional Court of Bulgaria declared the People's Court to be unconstitutional. As a consequence its decisions can be repelled without a review being necessary.

== Notable people sentenced by the People's Court ==
=== Sentenced to death ===
- The three regents of the yet immature king of Bulgaria Simeon II: king's uncle Prince Kiril, prime minister Bogdan Filov, lt. general Nikola Mihov.
- The most recent prime ministers prior to the coup: Bogdan Filov, Petar Gabrovski, Dobri Bozhilov and Ivan Bagryanov.
- The Chief of Staff of the Bulgarian Army Konstantin Lukash.
- Army Generals Nikola Stoychev, Nikola Nakov, Teodosi Daskalov, Rusi Rusev, Asen Nikolov, Georgi Nikolov.
- Aleksandar Staliyski - a right-wing politician.

=== Other sentences ===
- Atanas Burov - a banker and ex-minister sentenced to one year of imprisonment.
- Konstantin Muraviev - an interim prime-minister, received a life-time sentence, but was released in 1961.
- Nikola Mushanov - prime minister in the period 12 October 1931 – 19 May 1934. Sentenced for one year. Dies on 21 May 1951 in the cabinet of a doctor at Darzhavna sigurnost.
- Army Generals Vasil Boydev, Asen Sirakov.

== Remembrance ==
As of 2011 by suggestion of two ex-presidents of Bulgaria Zhelyu Zhelev and Petar Stoyanov, February 1 has been marked as the Day of remembrance and a tribute to the memory of the victims of the communist regime.

== See also ==
- Fatherland Front (Bulgaria)
- Forced labour camps in Communist Bulgaria
