= Teodosi Daskalov =

Bulgarian officer

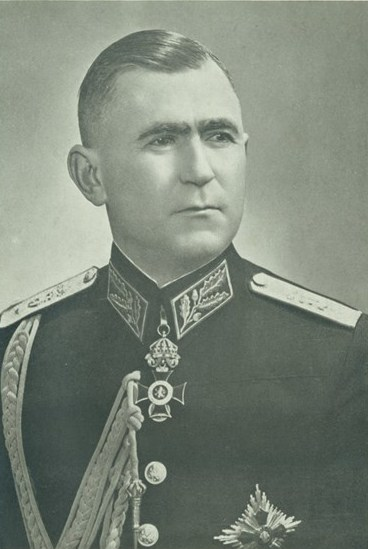

Minister of War of Bulgaria
- In office 24 January 1938 – 11 April 1942
- Preceded by: Hristo Lukov
- Succeeded by: Nikola Mihov

Personal details
- Born: September 2, 1888 Gorsko Slivovo, Kingdom of Bulgaria
- Died: February 1, 1945 (aged 56) Sofia, Bulgarian People's Republic

Military service
- Rank: General
- Battles/wars: World War II

Teodosi Petrov Daskalov (Bulgarian: Теодоси Даскалов) was a Bulgarian infantry general who served as Minister of War from January 24, 1938, to April 11, 1942. He was executed by the communist regime on February 1, 1945, after a death sentence issued by the so-called People's Court.

== Biography ==
Teodosi Daskalov was born on September 2, 1888, in the village of Gorsko Slivovo, Sevlievsko. He is the grandson of the activist Bacho Kiro - son of his daughter Dimitra Bacho-Kirova. In 1907, he graduated from the Military School in Sofia. An artillery officer, he served in the Balkan Wars and World War I as a battery and then a section commander in the Fifth Artillery Regiment.

In December 1920 Teodosi Daskalov was released from the army, but in November 1924 he was returned to service. In the following years, he briefly held various positions - editor-in-chief of military publications, head of a department in the General Staff, chief of staff of the Fifth Danube Infantry Regiment, commander of the Fifth Artillery Regiment, teacher and inspector of classes at the Military School. In 1932-1934 he was a military attaché in Italy, and after his return to Bulgaria he became chief of staff of the Third Military Inspection District (1934–1935), commander of the Fifth Danube Infantry Regiment (1935–1936) and chief of the garrison in Pleven (1936 – 1938).

On January 24, 1938, Daskalov was elected Minister of War in the second government of Georgi Kyoseivanov and remained in this position in his subsequent cabinets, as well as in the first government of Bogdan Filov. He was against the entry of Bulgaria into the Tripartite Pact, but on March 1, 1941, with the signing of the treaty for this accession, Daskalov issued order number 82, according to which Germany has the right to import arms into Bulgaria duty-free. Ultimately, on April 11, 1942, Daskalov was removed from the Council of Ministers and dismissed from the army with the rank of infantry general.

After the September 9 coup in 1944, Teodosi Daskalov was sentenced to death by the so-called People's Court and was shot on February 1, 1945, in Sofia, together with other prominent state and public figures.

Political offices
Preceded by Hristo Lukov	Minister of War of Bulgaria; 24 January 1938 – 11 April 1942	Succeeded by Nikola Mihov
