= Nikola Mihov =

Regent of Bulgaria

Regent Nikola Mihov
- Никола Михов
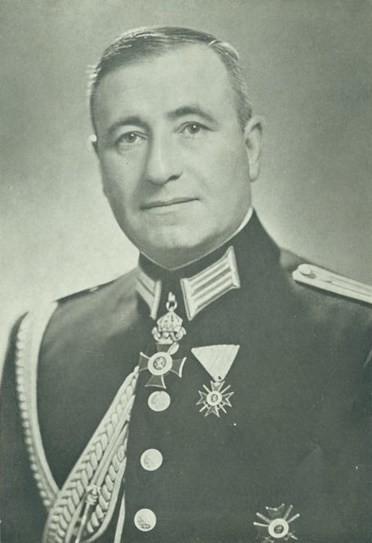
- Mihov in 1939

Regent of Bulgaria
- In office 11 September 1943 – 9 September 1944 Serving with Prince Kiril and Bogdan Filov
- Monarch: Simeon II
- Prime Minister: Petar Gabrovski (acting) Dobri Bozhilov Ivan Bagrianov Konstantin Muraviev
- Preceded by: Regency established
- Succeeded by: Todor Pavlov; Venelin Ganev; Tsvetko Boboshevski

Minister of War
- In office 11 April 1942 – 14 September 1943
- Monarchs: Boris III; Simeon II
- Prime Minister: Bogdan Filov
- Preceded by: Teodosi Daskalov
- Succeeded by: Rusi Rusev

Personal details
- Born: 11 December 1891 Veliko Tarnovo, Bulgaria
- Died: 1 February 1945 (aged 53) Sofia, Bulgaria

Military service
- Allegiance: Kingdom of Bulgaria
- Branch/service: Bulgarian Land Forces
- Years of service: 1912–1945
- Rank: Lieutenant general
- Commands: 3rd Division; 5th Army; 1st Army
- Battles/wars: Balkan Wars; World War I; World War II

Nikola Mihaylov Mihov (Bulgarian: Никола Михайлов Михов, 11 December 1891 – 1 February 1945) was a Bulgarian lieutenant general of artillery who served as one of the three Regents of Bulgaria for the underage Simeon II (1943–44).

== Biography ==
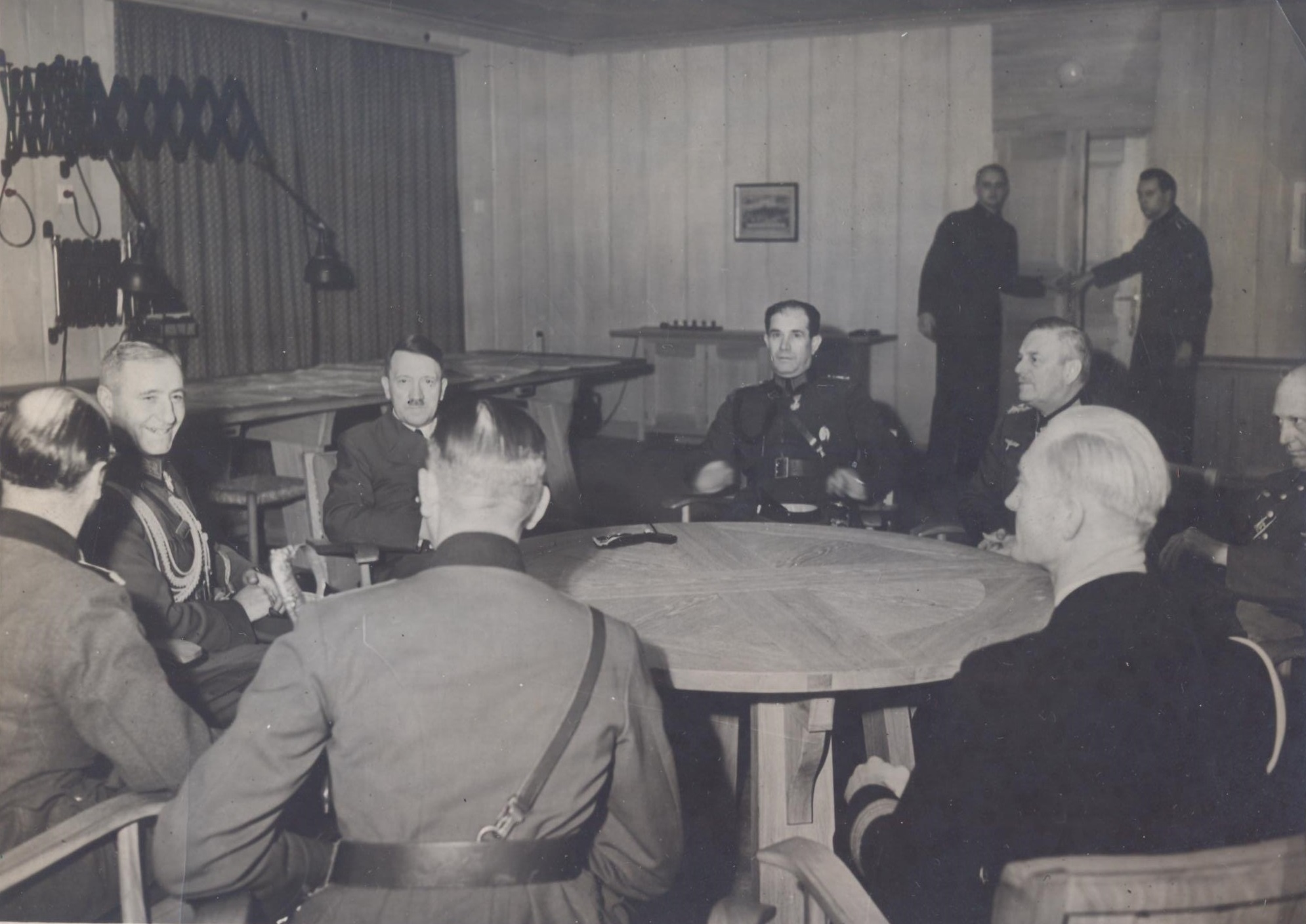
Meeting between Nikola Mihov, Adolf Hitler, Wilhelm Keitel (centre right) and Alfred Jodl (far right) in 1943

Nikola Mihov was born on 11 December 1891, in Veliko Tarnovo, in the then-Principality of Bulgaria. He graduated from the Sofia Military School in 1911. Mihov commanded an artillery battery during the Balkan Wars, taking part in the siege of Odrin. From April 1915 he was an assistant of the artillery inspector at the Military School. During World War I, Mihov commanded a battery in the 15th Artillery Regiment and took part in the capture of the Tutrakan fortress, defended by Romanian troops. In 1917, he led the 1st horsed artillery unit.

In 1922–29, Mihov was an artillery instructor at the Military School, an officer of the 4th Artillery Regiment, an adjutant in the artillery department of the War Ministry, and commander of a unit in the Sofia defense area. In 1929–32, he was the chief of a section of the Artillery Inspectorate. In 1932–33, he was the chief of the Engineering Inspectorate. Mihov commanded that the 7th Artillery Division in 1933–35. Since 1935 he was the head of the training department of the Artillery Inspectorate. Also around that time, Mihov was the editor of the publication Artillery Review. In 1936, Mihov became the assistant of the commander of the 3rd Division. Later that year he became its commander. He served as the head of the military school from 17 February 1937 until 19 April 1941.

In April–August 1941 he commanded the 5th Army, which took part in the invasion and occupation of Macedonia. In 1941–42, Mihov commanded the 1st Army, with its headquarters being in Sofia. From 11 April 1942 until 14 September 1943 he was the Minister of War in the second government of Bogdan Filov, a supporter of his politics.

On 9 September 1943, he became one of the three members of the Regent Council, which led Bulgaria after the death of Tsar Boris III and the coronation of the young Simeon II. One year later, after pro-Soviet forces rose to power in Bulgaria, Mihov was arrested by Bulgarian communists. On 1 February 1945, Mihov was sentenced to death by the so-called People's court and shot on the same day.

Mihov was pardoned by the Supreme Court of Bulgaria on 26 August 1996. His diary, which he wrote while being the regent of Bulgaria, was published in 2004. It covers the period from 19 September 1943 to 7 September 1944 – just a day before the coup.

== Ranks ==
- Junior ensign (22 September 1911)
- Ensign (1 November 1913)
- Captain (30 May 1917)
- Major (15 March 1923)
- Lieutenant colonel (1 April 1927)
- Colonel (6 May 1933)
- Major general (3 October 1938)
- Lieutenant general (1 January 1942)

== Awards ==
Kingdom of Bulgaria

- Order of Bravery (1st and 2nd class)
- Order of Saint Alexander (3rd and 4th class)
- Order of Military Merit (2nd class)

Nazi Germany

- Iron Cross 2nd class

== Sources ==
- Tasho Tashev, Ministers of Bulgaria 1879–1999. Sofia, AI "Prof. Marin Drinov" / Publishing house of the Ministry of Defense, 1999, ISBN 978-954-430-603-8 / ISBN 978-954-509-191-9 (in Bulgarian)
- Biography on Sklaviny.ru
- Biography on Generals.dk
- Biography on Boinslava.net

Political offices
Preceded by Teodosi Daskalov	Minister of War of Bulgaria; 11 April 1942 – 14 September 1943	Succeeded by Rusi Rusev
