= Giovanna of Savoy =

Tsaritsa of Bulgaria from 1930 to 1943

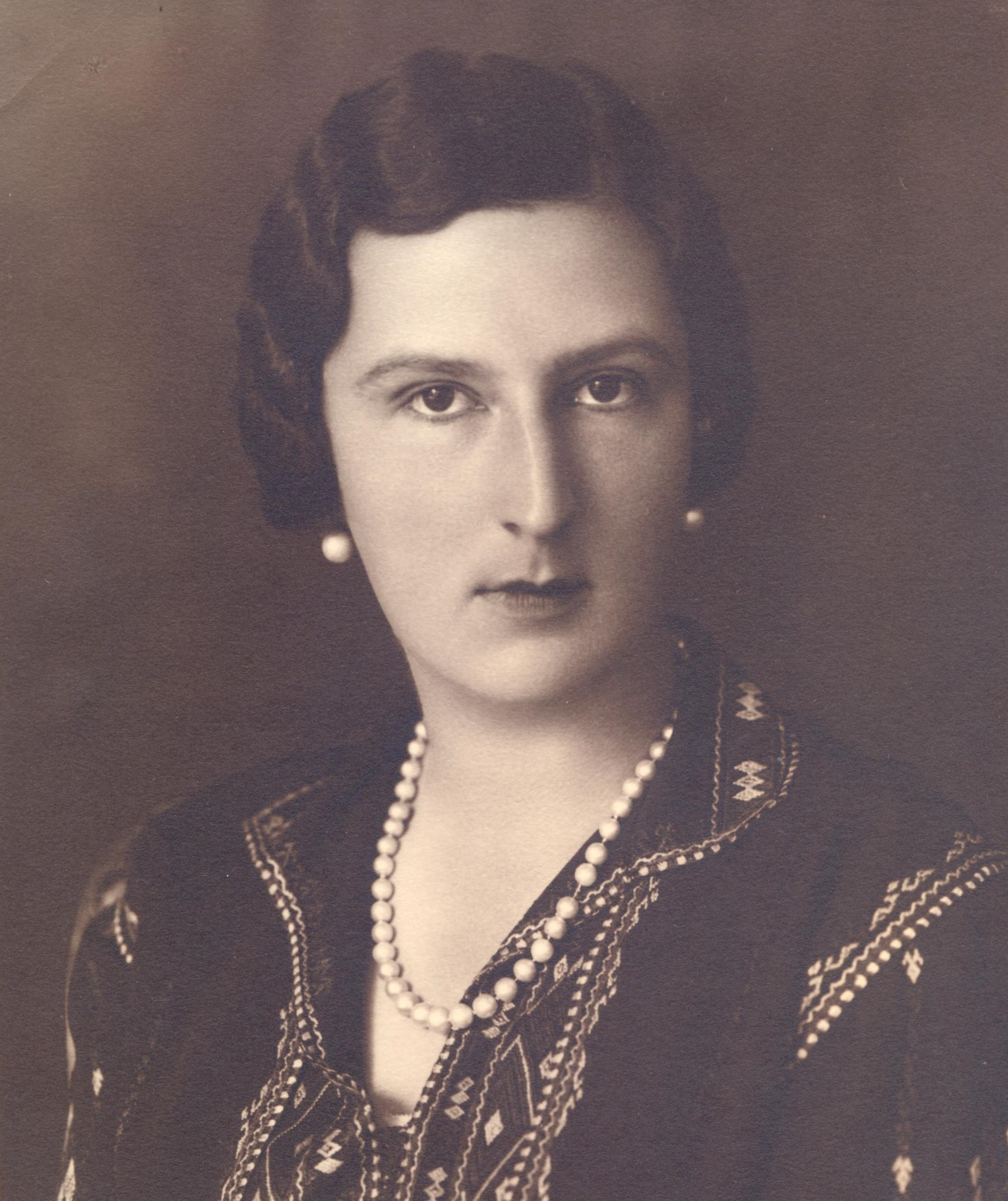
- Giovanna in 1937

Tsaritsa consort of Bulgaria
- Tenure: 25 October 1930 – 28 August 1943
- Born: 13 November 1907; Rome, Kingdom of Italy
- Died: 26 February 2000 (aged 92); Estoril, Portugal
- Burial: Communal Cemetery of Assisi
- Spouse: Boris III of Bulgaria (m. 1930; died 1943)
- Issue: Marie Louise, Princess of Koháry; Simeon II of Bulgaria
Names
- Italian: Giovanna Elisabetta Antonia Romana Maria
- House: Savoy
- Father: Victor Emmanuel III of Italy
- Mother: Elena of Montenegro

Giovanna of Savoy (Bulgarian: Йоанна Савойска, Yoanna Savoyska, Italian: Giovanna Elisabetta Antonia Romana Maria; 13 November 1907 – 26 February 2000) was an Italian princess of the House of Savoy who later became the Tsaritsa of Bulgaria by marriage to Boris III of Bulgaria.

== Early life ==
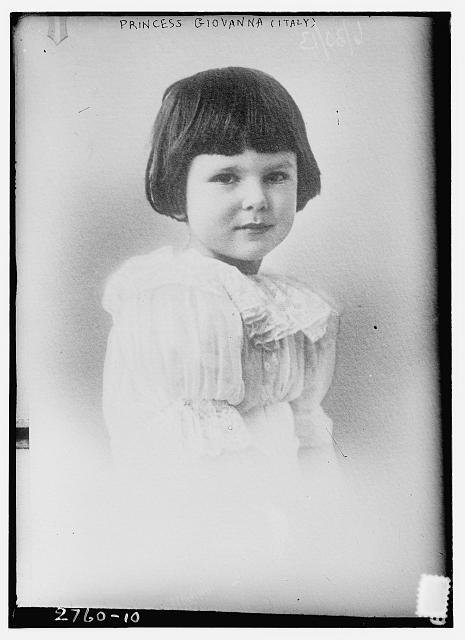
Giovanna as a child

Giovanna was born in Rome, the third daughter and the fourth of five children of King Victor Emmanuel III of Italy and Queen Elena, former Princess of Montenegro. Upon her Roman Catholic christening, she was given the names Giovanna Elisabetta Antonia Romana Maria. Her older brother was the future (and last) Italian king Umberto II of Italy.

== Tsaritsa of Bulgaria ==
Royal Monogram of Queen Giovanna of Bulgaria

Giovanna married Tsar Boris III of Bulgaria in the Basilica of St Francis of Assisi, Assisi on 25 October 1930, in a Catholic ceremony, attended by Italian dictator Benito Mussolini. Bulgarians deemed her a good match, partly because her mother, Elena of Montenegro, was of Slavic ethnicity. At a second ceremony in Sofia, Giovanna (who herself was the daughter of a Catholic father and a formerly Orthodox mother) was married in an Eastern Orthodox Church ceremony, bringing her into conflict with the Catholic Church. Giovanna adopted the Bulgarian version of her name, Ioanna. Giovanna knew the Pope's Apostolic Visitor to Bulgaria, Archbishop Angelo Roncalli, the future Pope John XXIII, who was able to help her. She and Boris had two children: Marie Louise of Bulgaria, born on 13 January 1933, and Simeon II of Bulgaria, born on 16 June 1937.

In the years prior to World War II, Tsaritsa Ioanna became heavily involved in charities, including the financing of a children's hospital. During the war she counterbalanced her husband's consigning of Bulgaria to the Axis by obtaining transit visas to enable a number of Jews to escape to Argentina. Tsar Boris also proved less malleable than Hitler had hoped, and following a meeting in Berlin in August 1943, the Tsar became seriously ill and died, aged 49. Stress and a heart condition were the official reasons for his death.

Ioanna's son, Simeon, became the new tsar and a regency was established, led by his uncle Prince Kiril, who was considered more pliable by the Germans.

In the dying days of the Second World War, Bulgaria was occupied by the Soviet Union. Prince Kiril was tried by a People's Court and subsequently executed. Ioanna and her son Simeon remained under house arrest at Vrana Palace, near Sofia, until 15 September 1946, when the new Communist government gave them 48 hours to leave the country because the state was declared a republic after a referendum, although the queen wanted to leave Bulgaria after the execution of Prince Kiril on 1 February 1945.

== Late years ==
After initially fleeing to Alexandria in the Kingdom of Egypt, to join her father, King Victor Emmanuel III, Giovanna and her son Simeon II moved on to Madrid. In 1962 Simeon II married and Queen Giovanna moved to Estoril, on the Portuguese Riviera, where she lived for the rest of her life, apart from a brief return to Bulgaria in 1993, when she visited the site of Boris's grave and was present at the reburial of his heart.

She is buried in the Communal Cemetery of Assisi, Italy, where she had married King Boris III in 1930.

== Honours, styles and arms ==
=== Honours ===
==== National ====
- (Kingdom of Italy) House of Savoy: Dame of the Order of Saints Maurice and Lazarus
  - Sovereign Military Order of Malta: Dame Grand Cross Honour and Devotion of the Sovereign Military Order of Malta, 3rd First Class
  - (Kingdom of the Two Sicilies) Royal Family of Two Sicilies: Dame Grand Cross of the Royal Order of Francis I
- (Bulgaria) House of Saxe-Coburg-Gotha-Koháry: Dame Grand Cross of the Royal Order of Saint Alexander, in Diamonds, 1933

==== Foreign ====
- (Austria-Hungary) Austrian Imperial and Royal Family: Dame of the Imperial and Royal Order of the Starry Cross
- (Kingdom of Bavaria) Bavarian Royal Family: Dame Grand Cross of the Royal Order of Theresa
- (Russian Empire) Russian Imperial Family: Dame Grand Cordon of the Imperial Order of Saint Catherine
- (Kingdom of Yugoslavia) Yugoslavian Royal Family: Dame Grand Cross of the Royal Order of Saint Sava

=== Styles ===
Styles of Tsaritsa (Queen) Giovanna of Bulgaria
- Reference style: Her Majesty
- Spoken style: Your Majesty

=== Arms ===
Coat of Arms of Queen Giovanna of Bulgaria

== Patronage ==
- Bulgaria: Patron of the 10th Cavalry regiment of Queen Ioanna

== Ancestry ==
Ancestors of Giovanna of Savoy

8. Victor Emmanuel II of Italy
4. Umberto I of Italy
9. Archduchess Adelaide of Austria
2. Victor Emmanuel III of Italy
10. Prince Ferdinand, Duke of Genoa
5. Princess Margherita of Savoy
11. Princess Elizabeth of Saxony
1. Giovanna of Savoy
12. Mirko Petrović-Njegoš, Grand Voivode of Grahovo
6. Nicholas I of Montenegro
13. Anastasija Martinović
3. Princess Elena of Montenegro
14. Voivode Petar Vukotić
7. Milena Vukotić
15. Jelena Voivodić

== Sources ==
- Boris III of Bulgaria 1894–1943, by Pashanko Dimitroff, London, 1986, ISBN 0-86332-140-2
- Crown of Thorns by Stephane Groueff, Lanham MD., and London, 1987, ISBN 0-8191-5778-3
- The Daily Telegraph, Obituary for "HM Queen Ioanna of the Bulgarians", London, 28 February 2000.

Giovanna of Savoy House of Savoy Born: 13 November 1907 Died: 26 February 2000
Royal titles
Vacant Title last held by Eleonore Reuss of Köstritz	Tsaritsa of Bulgaria; 25 October 1930 – 28 August 1943	Vacant Monarchy abolished
