= Nikola Stoychev =

Nikola Georgiev Stoychev was a Bulgarian Lieutenant-General who fought in World War II.

== Biography ==
He was born on October 13, 1891, in Kostenets.
He began serving in the Seventh Artillery Regiment. In 1928 he was an artillery instructor at the Reserve Officers' School. The following year he became commander of the Second Divisional Artillery Regiment, and from 1931 he was commander of the Third Divisional Artillery Regiment and worked in the artillery division at the State Military Factory. In 1934 he became head of the artillery department of the Fourth Military Inspection District. In the period 1936 - 1941 he was an inspector of artillery.

Between August 1941 and January 1943, he was commander of the Third Bulgarian Army. In November 1943, he became commander of the Second Bulgarian Army until September 1944, when Bulgaria switched sides after Soviet forces had crossed the Bulgarian-Romanian border. He went into reserve, until he was tried and sentenced to death by the People's Court and shot on February 1, 1945.

== Sources ==
- Generals.dk
- Boinaslava
