= List of predilect and adoptive sons and daughters of Madrid =

This list compiles people awarded with the hijo/a predilecto/a (predilect son or daughter) and hijo/a adoptivo/a (adoptive son or daughter) honorary titles by the Madrid municipality. The former referring to Madrid-born people while the latter to people born outside of Madrid, both awarded according "to their standout personal qualities or merits and, singularly, on the basis of their services of benefit, improvement or honour to Madrid".

These recognisements are for life and no more than 6 living people from each category may hold the title at the same time. As of 2019, the set of awarded people features an overwhelming male bias.

== Living ==
Adoptive son or daughter

- Juan Carlos I (1989)
- Simeon of Bulgaria (2004)
- Mario Vargas Llosa (2010)
- Rafael Nadal (2014)
- Raphael (2018)
- Pedro Almodóvar (2018)

Predilect son or daughter

- Plácido Domingo (2013)
- Julio Iglesias (2015)

== Died ==
Adoptive son or daughter

- Carmen Franco (awarded in 1962; d. 2017)
- Santiago Bernabéu (awarded in 1978; d. 1978)
- Luis Carandell (awarded in 1980; d. 2002)
- Camilo José Cela (awarded in 1982; d. 2002)
- Ángel Nieto (awarded in 1986; d. 2017)
- Josep Tarradellas (awarded in 1986; d. 1988)
- Luis Rosales
- José Montero Alonso (awarded in 1993; d. 2000)
- Fernando Rey (1994; posthumous)
- Julián Marías (awarded in 1994; d. 2005)
- Adolfo Suárez (awarded in 2014, posthumous)
- Francisco Tomás y Valiente
- Benito Pérez Galdós (awarded in 2019; posthumous)

Predilect son or daughter

- Rafael de Penagos (awarded in 1994; posthumous)
- Beltrán Osorio, Duke of Alburquerque (awarded in 1994; posthumous)
- Arturo Soria (awarded in 2021, posthumous)

== See also ==
- Honorary citizenship
