= Rusi Rusev =

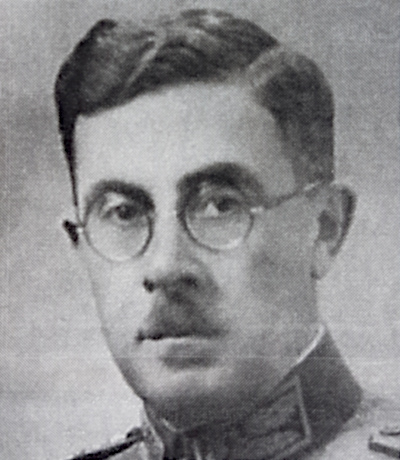

Minister of War of Bulgaria
- Preceded by: Nikola Mihov
- Succeeded by: Ivan Marinov

Personal details
- Born: November 27, 1887 Gabrovo, Kingdom of Bulgaria
- Died: February 1, 1945 (aged 57) Sofia, Bulgarian People's Republic

Military service
- Allegiance: Kingdom of Bulgaria
- Branch/service: Bulgarian Land Forces
- Rank: General
- Battles/wars: World War II

Rusi Rusev (Bulgarian: Руси Русев; 27 November 1887 - 1 February 1945) was a Bulgarian army general and politician who served as Minister of War of Bulgaria from 14 September 1943 to 2 September 1944.

== Biography ==
Rusi Rusev was born on November 27, 1887, in Gabrovo, graduated from the Military School in Sofia, graduating in 1909. During the Balkan Wars and World War I, he was a battery commander in the 4th Artillery Regiment. In the 1920s, he was on permanent military service in various garrisons, after 1930 he held inspection positions in the artillery.

From 1936, already as a major general, he held the position of Chief Inspector of Armaments in the Ministry of War, a position he held with small interruptions until 1942. During this period, Rusev carried out the rearmament of the Bulgarian Armed Forces with modern military equipment and techniques. Regraded as mildly pro-German in his views, he led the secret negotiations with Nazi Germany that led to the granting of multi-million war loans from Berlin in 1938 and 1939. He concluded the contracts with the individual German arms manufacturers and personally carried out the quality control of the supplies, which is why, until the beginning of the Second World War, often is in Germany. As a highly respected officer with an impeccable name, in the autumn of 1943, Lieutenant General Rusev assumed the post of Minister of War of Bulgaria in the cabinet of Dobri Bozhilov and subsequently in that of Ivan Bagrianov.

After the entry of the Red Army into Bulgaria, he was arrested, tried by the so-called People's Court. He was sentenced to death, fined 5 million Bulgarian lev and confiscation of property. Rusev was shot on February 1, 1945, in Sofia.

The sentence was overturned by Supreme Court of Cassation of Bulgaria Decision No. 172 of 1996.

Political offices
Preceded by Nikola Mihov	Minister of War of Bulgaria; 14 September 1943 – 2 September 1944	Succeeded by Ivan Marinov
