= Venelin Ganev =

Bulgarian lawyer, diplomat, and politician

- Венелин Ганев
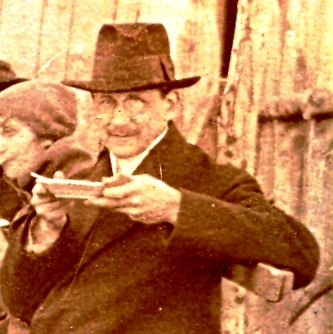
- Ganev before 1927
- Born: 16 February 1880; Rousse, Principality of Bulgaria
- Died: 25 March 1966 (aged 86); Sofia, People's Republic of Bulgaria
- Resting place: Central Sofia Cemetery; 42°42′50.1″N 23°19′59.6″E
- Occupations: Lawyer and Bulgarian politician

Venelin Yordanov Ganev (Bulgarian: Венелин Йорданов Ганев; 16 February 1880 – 25 March 1966) was a Bulgarian lawyer, diplomat, and politician. He was a leading authority on commercial law, and after the Communist coup d'état on 9 September 1944 was one of the regents of underage tsar Simeon II.

== Biography ==
Venelin Ganev was born on 16 February 1880 (or old-style 4 February) in Rousse, Bulgaria. He studied in Leipzig and Geneva, where Simeon Radev was a fellow-student of his. After returning to Bulgaria, Ganev taught philosophy of law (1908–1947) at Sofia University.

In 1908 Venelin Ganev joined the Radical-Democratic Party. In 1919 he was the Minister of Justice in Teodor Teodorov's second cabinet, and took part in the Bulgarian delegation for peace negotiations in Paris (before the Treaty of Neuilly). Afterwards, he served as a Bulgarian ambassador to France (1920–1922).

Venelin Ganev joined the newly formed Democratic Accord in 1923, along with most of the Radical-democratic Party. In 1925, he quit it and declared himself against the government's policy. Later, he established a League for Protection of Human Rights. During World War II he participated as an independent member in the Fatherland Front and entered its leadership. After the coup of 9 September 1944, he became a regent of tsar Simeon II, together with Todor Pavlov and Tsvetko Boboshevski, and he remained such until the fall of monarchy on 18 September 1946.

From 1945, Venelin Ganev opposed the increasing influence of the Bulgarian Communist Party and joined the opposition. In 1947 he was dismissed from his position at the University of Sofia and interned in Dryanovo (until 1956), and in 1948 he was expelled from the Bulgarian Academy of Sciences. In 1991 he was posthumously restored to the Bulgarian Academy of Sciences.

== Publications ==
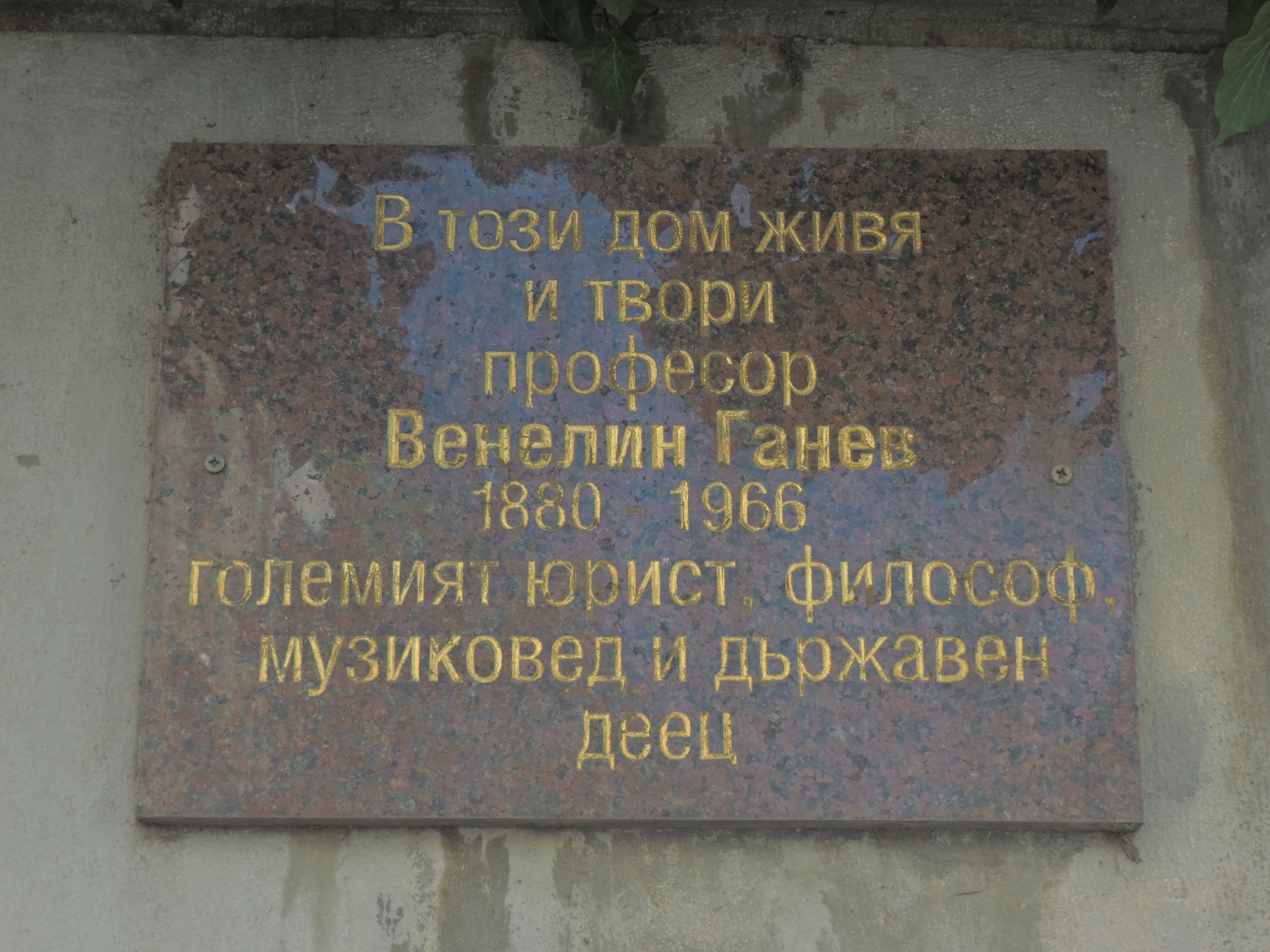
The memorial plaque at 53 "6-th September" Str., Sofia, where Ganev lived.

- Chopin (1919)
- Historical development of commercial law (1921)
- A course in common law theory. Introduction. Methodology of law (1921–1932, 1946)
- A course in commercial law (1923)
- A course in common law theory. Legal phenomenon (1925)
- A systematic course in [the study of] bankruptcy, volume I (1926)
- A textbook in common law theory (in two volumes; 1932–1938)
- Economic reality. An essay of a sociological synthesis (1945)
- Democracy (1946)
- Zakon soudnyi lyudym. Legal-historical and legal-analythic research (1959)

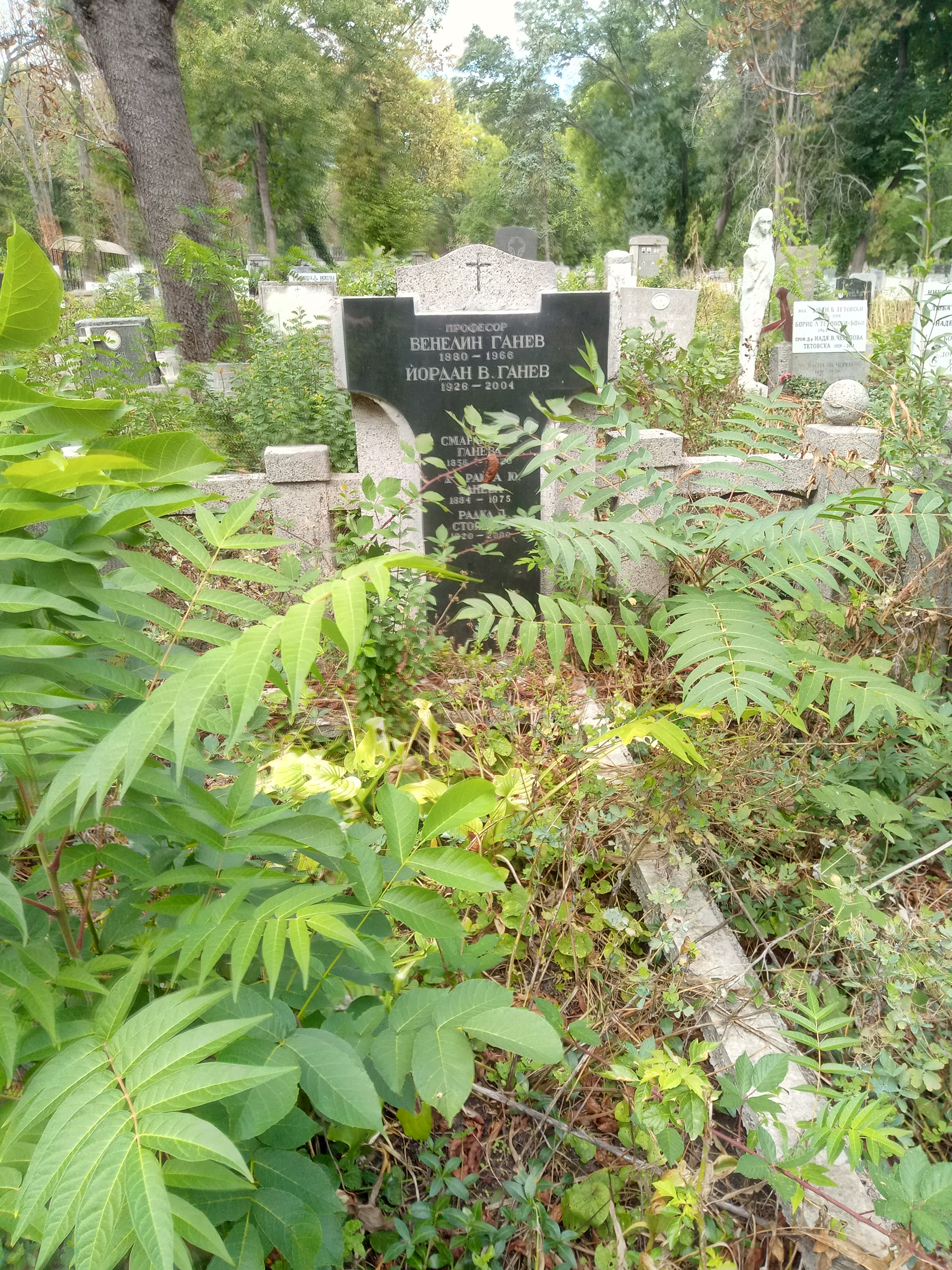
The Grave of Venelin Ganev at Sofia Central Cemetery (42°42′50.1″N 23°19′59.6″E)

== Sources ==
- Black, C. E. (February 1948). "Reviewed Work: Demokracija: Sustnost i osnovni nacala. (Democracy: Its Nature and Fundamental Principles) by Venelin Ganev". The American Slavic and East European Review. 7 (1): 98–100. doi:10.2307/2492124. JSTOR 2492124.
- Crampton, R. J. (1987). A Short History of Modern Bulgaria. Cambridge University Press. pp. 145, 164. ISBN 0-521-25340-3 – via Internet Archive.
- Tashev, T. (1999). The ministers of Bulgaria 1879–1999. ISBN 954-430-603-X.
