= 1946 Bulgarian republic referendum =

- 8 September 1946

Results
Choice	Votes	%
Yes	3,833,183	95.63%
No	175,231	4.37%
Valid votes	4,008,414	96.99%
Invalid or blank votes	124,507	3.01%
Total votes	4,132,921	100.00%
Registered voters/turnout	4,509,354	91.65%

A referendum on becoming a republic was held in Bulgaria on 8 September 1946. Official results showed 96% in favour of the change against only 4% in favour of retaining the monarchy, with voter turnout reported to be 92%. The monarchy had effectively ended soon after the coup of 9 September 1944, which saw the Fatherland Front seize power. At that time, the regency council for the head of state, Tsar Simeon II, was replaced by a new council made up entirely of members of the Bulgarian Communist Party, the dominant force of the Fatherland Front.

On paper, the referendum was unconstitutional according to the Tarnovo Constitution still in force at the time. Under the Tarnovo Constitution, the state system could not be changed by a referendum. The only constitutional way to do so was by convening a Grand National Assembly, which could only take place at the tsar's initiative.

== Aftermath ==
The country was declared a people's republic on 15 September 1946, formally putting an end to 68 years of monarchy. On the following day, Simeon and his mother, Queen Giovanna, were forced to leave the country, although the queen had wanted to leave Bulgaria after the execution of Prince Kiril on 1 February 1945.

After the referendum, elections were held a month later to elect a Grand National Assembly. This body adopted a new republican constitution, known as the Dimitrov Constitution, which took effect the following year.

== Results ==
Choice	Votes	%
For	3,833,183	95.63
Against	175,231	4.37
Total	4,008,414	100.00
Valid votes	4,008,414	96.99
Invalid/blank votes	124,507	3.01
Total votes	4,132,921	100.00
Registered voters/turnout	4,509,354	91.65
Source: Nohlen & Stöver
