= Kiril, Prince of Preslav =

Prince of Preslav (1895–1945)

Kiril
- Prince of Preslav
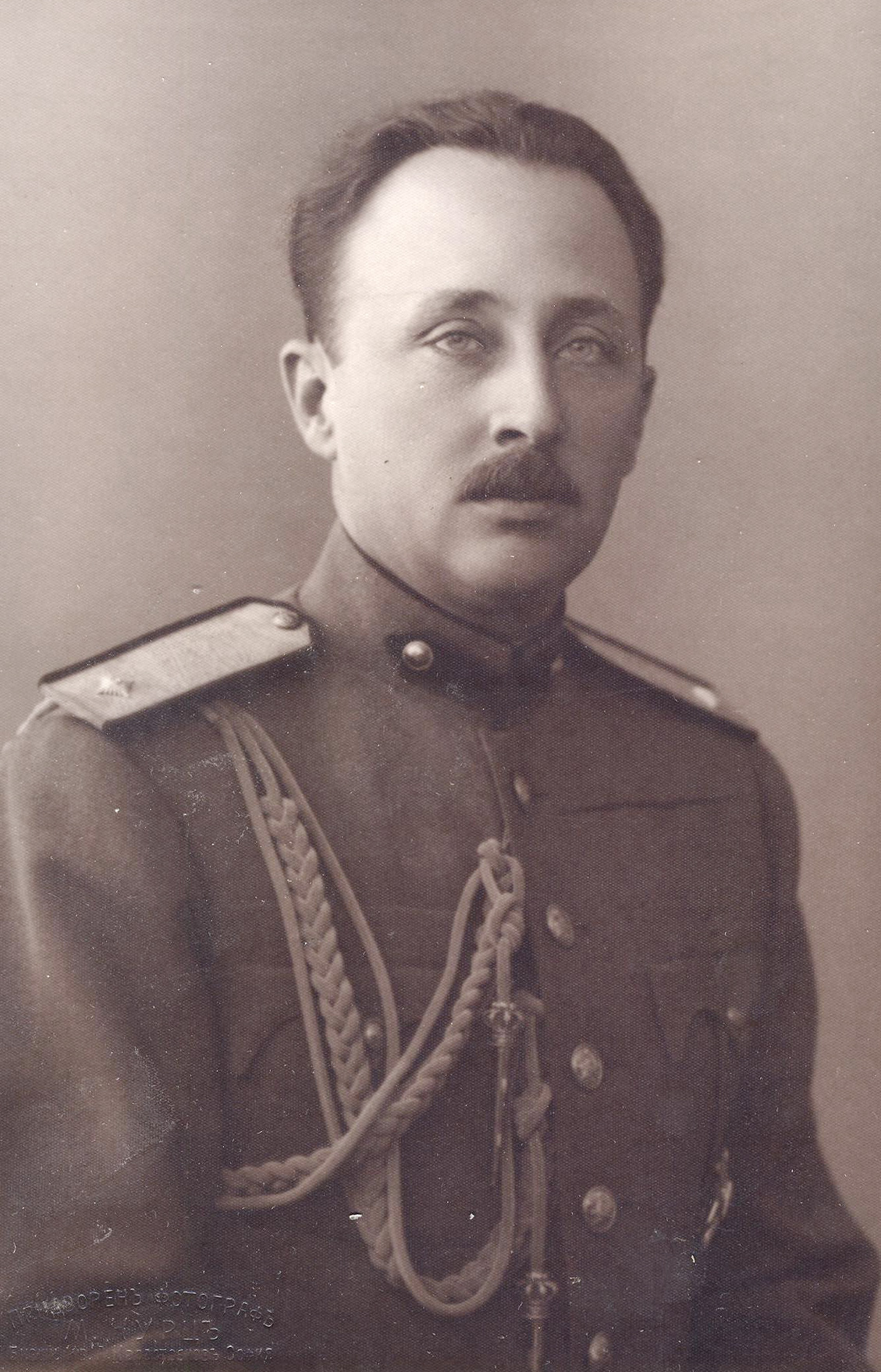

Prince Regent of Bulgaria
- Tenure: 28 August 1943 – 9 September 1944
- Monarch: Simeon II
- Born: 17 November 1895; Sofia, Principality of Bulgaria
- Died: 1 February 1945 (aged 49); Sofia, Kingdom of Bulgaria
- Burial: Central Sofia Cemetery, Sofia, Kingdom of Bulgaria
Names
- German: Kyril Heinrich Franz Ludwig Anton Karl Philipp; Bulgarian: Кирил Хайнрих Франц Лудвиг Антон Карл Филип
- House: Saxe-Coburg and Gotha-Koháry
- Father: Ferdinand I of Bulgaria
- Mother: Marie Louise of Bourbon-Parma
- Religion: Roman Catholic

Prince Kiril of Bulgaria, Prince of Preslav (Bulgarian: Кирил, принц Преславски, German: Kyrill Heinrich Franz Ludwig Anton Karl Philipp Prinz von Bulgarien; 17 November 1895 – 1 February 1945) was the second son of Ferdinand I of Bulgaria and his first wife Marie Louise of Bourbon-Parma. He was a younger brother of Boris III of Bulgaria and a prince regent of the Kingdom of Bulgaria from 1943 to 1944. He was sentenced to death by the People's Court and executed on the night of 1 February 1945.

== Biography ==
Royal Monogram of Prince Kiril of Bulgaria

He was born on 17 January 1895 in Sofia as the second son of Ferdinand I of Bulgaria and his first wife, Marie Louise of Bourbon-Parma.

During the First World War, Kiril was considered as a candidate for the restored Polish crown in 1917, as well as the throne of Albania.

In September 1936, Prince Kiril accompanied King Edward VIII on a whistle-stop tour of Bulgaria. Present at the death of his brother, Tsar Boris, on 28 August 1943, Prince Kiril was appointed head of a regency council by the Bulgarian parliament, to act as Head of State until the late Tsar's son, Simeon II of Bulgaria, became 18.

Prince Kiril, with the widowed Tsaritsa, Giovanna of Savoy, daughter of the Italian king, led the state funeral for his brother Tsar Boris III on 5 September 1943 at the Alexander Nevsky Cathedral, Sofia, thereafter proceeding across the city to the main railway station where the funeral train waited to take the body to the 12th-century Rila Monastery in the mountains. Thereafter, three consecutive governments made efforts to extricate themselves from Bulgaria's agreements with Germany, notably one that permitted their use of the railway to Greece and the deployment of German troops to safeguard it against sabotage. A Bulgarian delegation travelled to Cairo in an attempt to negotiate with the United States and the United Kingdom but failed, as the latter refused to meet the delegation without the participation of the Soviet Union.

Despite Sofia's continuous diplomatic ties with the Soviet Union, on 5 September 1944, that country declared war on Bulgaria, and on 8 September Soviet armies crossed the Romanian border and the Danube. The Fatherland Front, a coalition of the Communist Party, the left wing of the Agrarian Union, the Zveno group, and a few pro-Soviet politicians who had returned from exile in the Soviet Union, executed a Soviet-backed military coup on 9 September and seized power.

In late January 1945 Prince Kiril was sentenced to death by the People's Court. On the night of February 1, 1945 he was executed at Sofia Central Cemetery along with former Prime Minister and Regent Professor Bogdan Filov, Regent General Nikola Mihov, and a range of former cabinet ministers, royal advisors and 67 MPs. The bodies of the executed were then reportedly thrown into a bomb crater, left over from the Allied bombings of Sofia, covered with ash and dirt, with the crater leveled and new graves being buried on top of it later.

A monument to the 104 executed people was unveiled at Sophia Central Cemetery in 1995. On August 26, 1996, the Supreme Court overturned the sentences of February 1, 1945, which had sentenced the three regents, ministers, and councilors to death.

== Honours and arms ==
Decorations

- Kingdom of Bulgaria: Knight of the Royal Order of Saints Cyril and Methodius
- Kingdom of Prussia: Knight of the Order of the Black Eagle
- Kingdom of Bavaria: Knight of the Order of Saint Hubert
- Kingdom of Italy: Knight of the Supreme Order of the Most Holy Annunciation, 1930
- Kingdom of Yugoslavia: Grand Cross of the Royal Order of the Star of Karađorđe

Arms

Coat of Arms of Prince Kiril of Bulgaria

== Ancestors ==
Ancestors of Kiril, Prince of Preslav

8. Prince Ferdinand of Saxe-Coburg and Gotha
4. Prince August of Saxe-Coburg and Gotha
9. Princess Maria Antonia Koháry of Csábrág and Szitnya
2. Ferdinand I of Bulgaria
10. Louis Philippe I of France
5. Princess Clémentine of Orléans
11. Princess Maria Amalia of Naples and Sicily
1. Kiril, Prince of Preslav
12. Charles III, Duke of Parma
6. Robert I, Duke of Parma
13. Princess Louise of Artois
3. Princess Marie Louise of Bourbon-Parma
14. Ferdinand II of the Two Sicilies
7. Princess Maria Pia of Bourbon-Two Sicilies
15. Archduchess Maria Theresa of Austria

== Literature ==
- Bulgaria in the Second World War by Marshall Lee Miller, Stanford University Press, 1975.
- Boris III of Bulgaria 1894–1943, by Pashanko Dimitroff, London, 1986, ISBN 0-86332-140-2
- Crown of Thorns by Stephane Groueff, Lanham MD., and London, 1987, ISBN 0-8191-5778-3
- The Betrayal of Bulgaria by Gregory Lauder-Frost, Monarchist League Policy Paper, London, 1989.
- The Daily Telegraph, Obituary for "HM Queen Ioanna of the Bulgarians", London, 28 February 2000.
