= Bogdan Filov =

28th prime minister of Bulgaria

- Богдан Филов
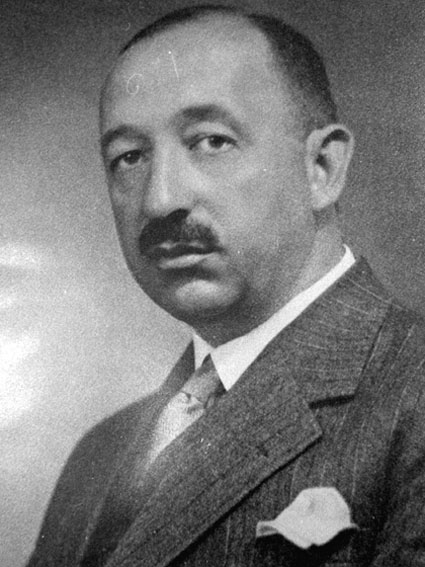

28th Prime Minister of Bulgaria
- In office 16 February 1940 – 9 September 1943
- Monarchs: Boris III; Simeon II
- Preceded by: Georgi Kyoseivanov
- Succeeded by: Petur Gabrovski (acting)

Regent of Bulgaria
- In office 28 August 1943 – 9 September 1944 Serving with Prince Kiril and Nikola Mikhov
- Monarch: Simeon II
- Prime Minister: Himself Petur Gabrovski (acting) Dobri Bozhilov Ivan Ivanov Bagryanov Konstantin Muraviev
- Preceded by: Regency established
- Succeeded by: Todor Pavlov Venelin Ganev Tsvyatko Boboshevski

Personal details
- Born: 10 April 1883 Stara Zagora, Eastern Rumelia (modern-day Bulgaria)
- Died: 1 February 1945 (aged 61) Sofia, Bulgaria
- Cause of death: Execution by firing squad
- Party: Independent
- Spouse: Evdokia Peteva-Filova

Bogdan Dimitrov Filov (Bulgarian: Богдан Димитров Филов; 10 April 1883 – 1 February 1945) was a Bulgarian archaeologist, art historian and politician. He was prime minister of Bulgaria during World War II. During his tenure, Bulgaria became the seventh nation to join the Axis powers.

== Early life ==
Born in Stara Zagora, Filov was partly educated in Imperial Germany at Leipzig, Freiburg, and Würzburg. His Ph.D. dissertation from Freiburg was published as a book – a supplement to the prestigious German magazine Klio in Leipzig. Beginning May 1, 1906, he worked in the National Archaeological Museum in Sofia. Filov studied archeology and numismatics in Bonn, Paris and Rome from 1907 to 1909. He was the indisputable leader of "antique" (pre-classical) archaeology in Bulgaria. In 1927 he published the finds from Trebenishta, a necropolis of Peresadyes, rich with gold and iron artifacts. Between 1910 and 1920 Filov was director of the National Archaeological Museum. He conducted the first studies of the ancient city of Kabile, near Yambol, in 1912. In 1920 Filov became a professor of archeology, and of art history, at Sofia University. In 1920 a chair of archaeology was established at the university, and Filov was appointed to it. The Archaeological Society in Sofia developed into an Archaeological Institute with a Department of Antique Archaeology. In 1937, Filov was elected chairman of the Bulgarian Academy of Sciences.

== Prime minister ==
On 15 February 1940, following the resignation of Georgi Kyoseivanov, Filov was appointed prime minister of the Kingdom of Bulgaria. Filov was an ally of Tsar Boris III of Bulgaria. On 7 September, Bulgaria was awarded the southern part of Dobruja by the Treaty of Craiova. On 14 February of the following year, Bulgaria signed a non-aggression pact with the Axis powers and on 1 March joined the Tripartite Pact. On Bulgaria's Independence Day, March 3, German troops crossed into Bulgaria on the way to invade the Kingdom of Yugoslavia and the Kingdom of Greece. Though a titular member of the Axis, Bulgaria stayed out of the war as much as possible during the regime of King Boris and Premier Filov. After the death of Boris in August 1943, Filov became a member of the Regency Council established because the new tsar, Simeon II, was underage.

== Antisemitic law and pro-German policy ==
In November, 1940, the government of Bogdan Filov proposed the Law for Protection of the Nation; Parliament voted its approval on December 24, 1940. According to the Holocaust Encyclopaedia this law was equivalent to the Nuremberg Laws of the Third Reich and deprived the Jews of civil rights.

Filov established the Commissariat for Jewish Affairs as executive body concerned with Jews in Bulgaria. In accordance with a governmental decision made in March 1943, Jews from the "newly annexed territories", who were not Bulgarian subjects, were deported by Bulgarian authorities to German extermination camps: in total, 11,343 Jews from then occupied northern Greece and Vardar Banovina were deported to German custody and later to the Treblinka killing centers; almost none survived. However, yielding to pressure from the Bulgarian Orthodox Church and from the deputy speaker of Parliament, Dimitar Peshev, the Nazi-allied government did not deport the 50,000 Jews who were Bulgarian subjects from the "old lands" (antebellum Bulgaria), thus saving them.

== Death ==
Following the armistice with the Soviet Union whose forces had entered Bulgaria in 1944, a new Communist-dominated government was established and the Regency Council members were arrested. Filov and ninety-two other public officials were sentenced to death by a "People's Tribunal" on the afternoon of 1 February 1945 and executed by firing squad that night in Sofia cemetery. They were then buried in a mass grave that had been a bomb crater. The former professor was described in one obituary as a man who had mistakenly "preferred making history to teaching it". Filov's property was confiscated and his wife exiled.

The sentence was revoked by the Bulgarian Supreme Court on June 26, 1996. His diary was first published in 1986.

== See also ==
- Treaty of Craiova
- Military history of Bulgaria during World War II

== Notes ==
Political offices
Preceded by Georgi Kyoseivanov	Prime Minister of Bulgaria; 1940–1943	Succeeded by Petur Gabrovski
Preceded by Ivan Popov	Minister of Foreign Affairs of Bulgaria; 1942–1943	Succeeded by Sava Kirov
