= 1944 Bulgarian coup d'état =

Socialist overthrow of the monarchy

1944 Bulgarian coup d'état Деветосептемврийски преврат
- Part of World War II and Bulgarian resistance
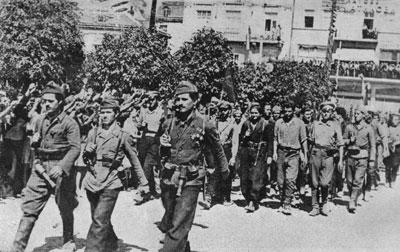
- NOVA partisans entering Plovdiv, 9 September 1944
Date	9 September 1944
Location	Kingdom of Bulgaria
Result	Fatherland Front victory: Beginning of Goryani movement

Belligerents
Bulgaria: Royal Army; Supported by: Germany	Fatherland Front: NOVA; BCP; BZNS; Zveno; Supported by: Soviet Union

Commanders and leaders
(Tsardom of Bulgaria (1908–1946)) Prince Kiril (executed) (Tsardom of Bulgaria (1908–1946)) Bogdan Filov (executed) (Tsardom of Bulgaria (1908–1946)) Nikola Mihov (executed) (Tsardom of Bulgaria (1908–1946)) Konstantin Muraviev	Georgi Dimitrov Vasil Kolarov Kimon Georgiev Ivan Marinov Damyan Velchev

The 1944 Bulgarian coup d'état, also known as the 9 September coup d'état (Bulgarian: Деветосептемврийски преврат, romanized: Devetoseptemvriyski prevrat), was a coup that overthrew the government of Kingdom of Bulgaria on the eve of 9 September 1944. During the Communist era, official propaganda called the coup the People's Uprising of 9 September on the grounds of the broad unrest and the Socialist Revolution as it was a turning point politically and the beginning of radical reforms towards Soviet-style socialism.

== Summary ==
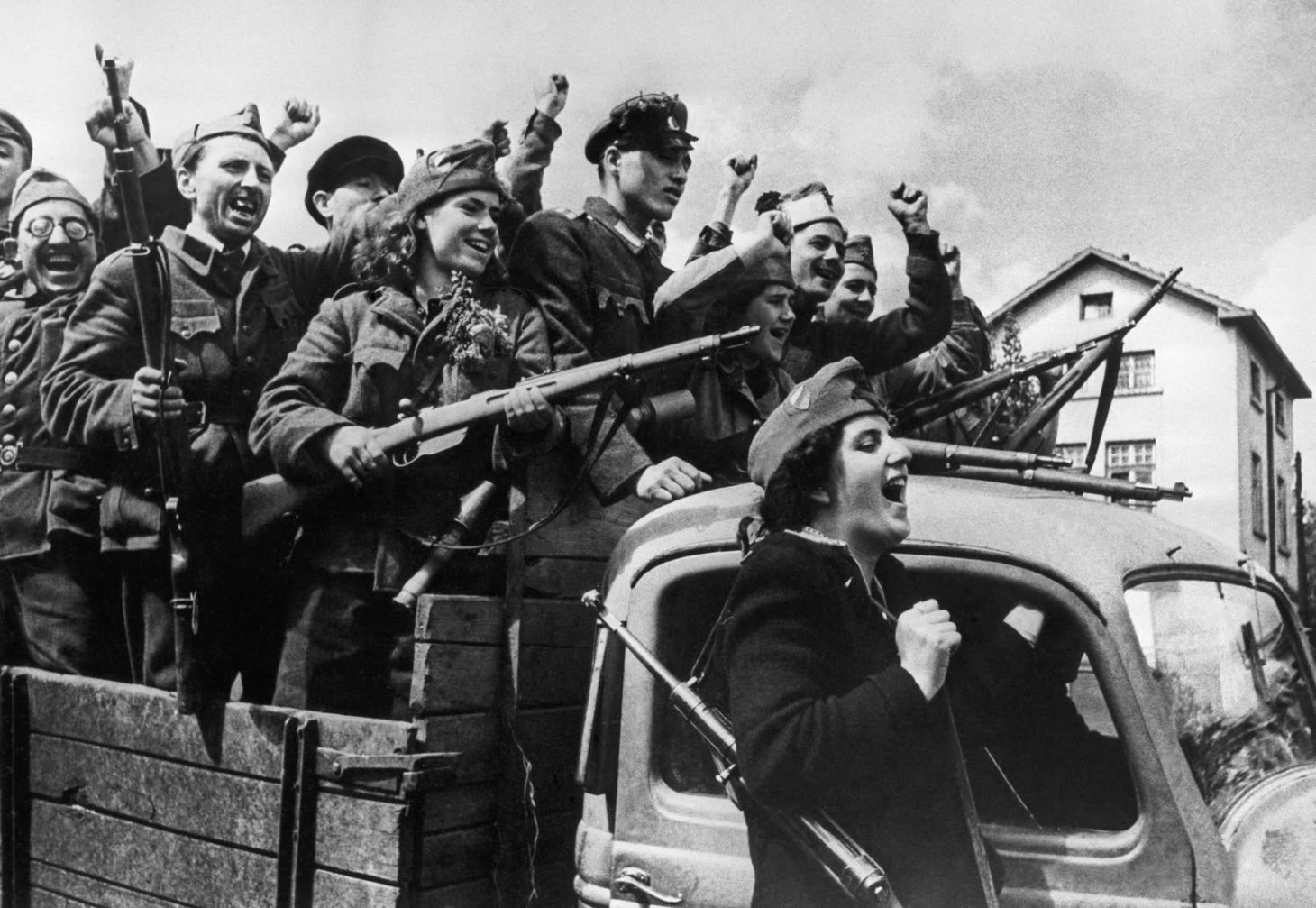
Bulgarian partisans enter Sofia on 9 September

Bulgaria was in a precarious situation, still in the sphere of Nazi Germany's influence (as a former member of the Axis powers, with German troops in the country despite the declared Bulgarian neutrality 15 days earlier), but under threat of war with the leading military power of that time, the Soviet Union. The USSR had declared war on the Kingdom of Bulgaria 4 days earlier and units of its Third Russian Front of the Red Army had entered Bulgaria 3 days after. Demonstrations, strikes, revolts broke out in many cities and villages (6 - 7 September) and local government power had been taken by Bulgarian Fatherland Front (FF) forces (without Red Army help) in Varna, Burgas, and other locations.

The coup d'état was organized by the Fatherland Front political coalition (led by the Bulgarian Communists) and performed by pro-FF units of the Bulgarian Army and the Bulgarian partisan forces of the People's Liberation Insurgent Army (Народоосвободителна въстаническа армия, НОВА; Narodoosvoboditelna vastanicheska armiya, NOVA).

As a direct result, the government of Prime Minister Konstantin Muraviev was overthrown and replaced with a government of the FF led by Kimon Georgiev. Bulgaria immediately joined the Allies and fought against Nazi Germany. The Kingdom of Bulgaria became a republic after the Bulgarian republic referendum in 1946. Large-scale political, economic and social changes were introduced to the country. The coup resulted in Bulgaria entering into the Soviet sphere of influence and the beginning of the Bulgarian People's Republic.

== Background ==
On 26 August 1944, the government of Ivan Bagryanov had verbally declared Bulgaria's neutrality in the war under the threat of the Red Army's offensive in neighbouring Romania. At the same time, in Egypt the government had entered separate peace talks with the United Kingdom and the United States, hoping to secure the dispatch of British and American troops in Bulgaria. On the same day, the Central Committee of the Bulgarian Workers' Party (BWP) proclaimed the assumption of power by means of a popular uprising to be its official task.

A government of the Bulgarian Agrarian National Union (BANU) "Vrabcha 1", until then in opposition, was formed on 2 September 1944, headed by Konstantin Muraviev. It continued the peace talks, declared its support for democratic reforms and ordered the withdrawal of German Army troops from Bulgaria. At the same time, the guerrilla actions of the partisans did not cease, the alliance with Nazi Germany was not disbanded and no attempts were made to normalize the relations with Moscow, causing the Soviet Union to treat the new government with suspicion. On 5 September 1944, the Soviet Union declared war on Bulgaria.

The Central Committee of the BWP and the general staff of the People's Liberation Revolt Army commenced, on 5 September, planning of a coup d'état. The plan was further detailed on 8 September. According to the plan, the coordinated actions of the partisans, the BWP combat groups and the pro-Fatherland Front army detachments would assume power and effective control of government during the night of 9 September. The stated goal of the coup d'état was the "overthrowing of the fascist authorities and the establishment of popular-democratic power of the Fatherland Front".

Unrest began all around Bulgaria on 6 September and 7 September, with the strikes of the Pernik miners and the Sofia tram employees, as well as the general strikes in Plovdiv and Gabrovo. The prisons in Pleven, Varna and Sliven had their political prisoners released; 170 localities were entered by partisan detachments between 6 September and 8 September. In many cities and villages, the strikes and meetings grew into armed clashes with the police, with victims on both sides. On 8 September, the Red Army entered Bulgaria meeting with no opposition on the order of the new Bulgarian government.

== Timeline of the 1944 Bulgarian Coup d'état and Communist Takeover ==
26 August 1944 - Under threat of the advancing Soviet front, Premier Ivan Bagryanov's government proclaims Bulgarian neutrality and orders German troops to withdraw. The Communist Party's Central Committee immediately calls for an armed uprising to seize power. (On 30 Aug, Stalin announced the USSR would no longer recognize Bulgaria's neutrality, raising the stakes.)

2 September 1944 - A new government of the Agrarian "Vrabcha 1" coalition is formed under Prime Minister Konstantin Muraviev. It resumes peace talks with the Allies and orders German forces to leave Bulgaria, but the Fatherland Front (dominated by Communists) withholds support and continues partisan operations. Soviet distrust grows as guerrilla actions persist.

5 September 1944 - The Soviet Union officially declares war on Bulgaria (catching the Western Allies by surprise) and on that day Communist leaders begin planning a coup. The Bulgarian Workers' Party (Communists) and partisan command finalize a plan to overthrow Muraviev's government during the night of 8–9 September.

6-7 September 1944 - Mass unrest erupts nationwide in anticipation of change. Key examples include a general strike by Pernik miners, a tramworkers' strike in Sofia, and general strikes in Plovdiv and Gabrovo. Partisan detachments flood over 170 localities by 8 September, freeing political prisoners in Pleven, Varna and Sliven. Many demonstrations turn violent as FF-organized militias clash with police.

8 September 1944 - By this date Bulgaria has formally broken with the Axis (declaring war on Germany) but is simultaneously at war with Britain, the USA and the USSR. Soviet 3rd Ukrainian Front forces cross into northeastern Bulgaria (Varna, Burgas, etc.) unopposed - on government orders the Bulgarian Army offers no resistance. Fatherland Front militias and partisans by now control many regional governments.

Night of 8–9 September 1944 - In Sofia the coup is launched. In the early hours (about 2:00 AM) Zveno-affiliated officers and War Minister General Ivan Marinov seize the War Ministry and other key installations. First Infantry Division and reserve schools obey Marinov's orders to join the coup. Within four hours the FF-aligned troops and partisan guerrillas control Sofia's government, police HQ and communication hubs.

9 September 1944 (morning) - At 6:25 AM Kimon Georgiev (leader of the Zveno coup group, now Fatherland Front premier) broadcasts a proclamation over Radio Sofia announcing that the Fatherland Front has assumed power "in order to save the country". Under orders of NOVA partisan commander Dobri Terpeshev all guerrilla units stream down from the mountains to occupy towns and villages. In Sofia, Plovdiv, Pernik and other regions, remaining loyalist army and police forces either stand down or are defeated in skirmishes. By mid‐day the Muraviev government is overthrown and a Fatherland Front coalition cabinet (Communists, Zveno, Agrarians, Social Democrats) is proclaimed. Prime Minister Muraviev and the three royal Regents (HRH Prince Kiril, Bogdan Filov, Nikola Mihov) are arrested. (The BTA confirms the regents were immediately removed and new Soviet-backed regents installed.) Kimon Georgiev is approved as Prime Minister, and Bulgaria nominally remains a monarchy under the 7‑year-old HRH Tsar Simeon II (albeit without real power).

9 September 1944 (evening) - Soviet-Bulgarian hostilities formally end. On the evening of the coup a high-level Bulgarian delegation (General Stanchev and others) meets Marshal Tolbukhin, commander of the 3rd Ukrainian Front. Late that night (about 10:00 PM) Stalin orders Soviet forces to halt all offensive operations in Bulgaria. Effectively, Bulgarian troops have ceased fighting the Soviets (orders forbade any resistance). The swift, bloodless victory of the Fatherland Front over pro-German elements sends a clear signal that the USSR is now the dominant power in Bulgarian affairs.

10 September 1944 - The new government moves quickly to dismantle former regime institutions. The old Interior Ministry police are abolished; a new People's Militia of former partisans is organized to maintain order. Over 8,130 political prisoners are released from jails, and the concentration camps of the old regime (e.g. Gonda voda, Krasto pole) are closed. All fascist organizations and publications are banned. Local Antifascist Committees (FCs) take charge in towns and villages. The Fatherland Front cabinet begins appointing loyal officers to command the army and police.

12 September 1944 - Pockets of military resistance are overcome. In the Pernik area and at Shumen insurgent forces rout remaining loyalist units. At Haskovo partisans storm the large artillery barracks on 12 Sept (suffering heavy losses) to eliminate a final island of government control. That same day the new regime issues a legal decree authorizing the arrest of all wartime cabinet ministers (1941–44), members of the old parliament and high-ranking officers. This official decree gives retroactive legitimacy to mass arrests that are now sweeping the country - in the following weeks thousands (civil servants, landowners, intellectuals, Social Democrats, Agrarians and others) are detained by the militia and FC cadres on flimsy charges.

17 September 1944 - Prime Minister Georgiev publicly outlines the Fatherland Front's program. At a rally in Sofia's Palace of Justice he promises democratic reforms, anti-fascist justice and sweeping social change. (Zveno, now an official party again, holds a national conference on 1 Oct, but its role is increasingly overshadowed by the Communists.)

10 October 1944 - Under Soviet pressure, the Fatherland Front orders the Bulgarian Army to withdraw from territories in Greek and Yugoslav Macedonia and Thrace (occupied since 1941). This fulfills a key Allied demand and isolates Bulgarian forces to the pre-1941 border.

28 October 1944 - Bulgaria signs the Moscow Armistice with the Allied Powers. Foreign Minister Petko Staynov, Ministers Nikola Petkov, Dobri Terpeshev and Petko Stoyanov sign on behalf of Bulgaria (represented by Gen. Gammell for the Allies and Marshal Tolbukhin for the USSR). The armistice terms acknowledge that Bulgaria "ceased hostilities with the USSR on September 9" and agrees to disarm remaining German forces. Bulgaria commits to cede the care of its troops to the Allied (Soviet) command and to withdraw from Greek/Yugoslav territory. Crucially, Bulgaria must tolerate Soviet occupation of its territory and submit to an Allied Control Commission (dominated by the USSR). In effect, Bulgaria is now firmly in the Soviet camp and must immediately "make available" its army for Soviet-directed operations against Germany.

3 December 1944 - A sharp political clash occurs over remnants of the old military. Acting on a proposal by nationalist General Damyan Velchev, the Council of Ministers decrees that officers charged under the forthcoming People's Court law may be sent to the front; if they "show bravery," they can earn discharge. This measure (intended to rally the armed forces by mercy) is immediately denounced by the Communists as "counter-revolutionary."

6 December 1944 - The Soviet Allied Control Commission intervenes. Marshal Sergey Biryuzov, Soviet head of the commission, insists that the 3 Dec decree be revoked. Reluctantly, the Georgiev government cancels its own decree, fearing a breakdown in relations with Moscow. In the aftermath, Communists take direct control of the military and security apparatus. Communist cadres assume top posts in the General Staff and DS intelligence, while Dr. Georgiev (as War Minister) and Col. General Damyan Velchev (Defense) are sidelined.

December 1944 - The new regime formalizes its system of reprisals. The Council of Ministers issues a decree establishing the People's Court (Naroden sad) - a special tribunal to try fascist officials and wartime collaborators (Hearings began in early 1945). This paves the way for a nationwide purge. During these months thousands of former officials are tried, and many are summarily executed or sentenced to death. In parallel, extrajudicial killings of "class enemies" surge, particularly in Sofia, where Communist security forces eliminate real and imagined opponents. In short order, virtually all political opposition outside the Fatherland Front is crushed and monarchy is rendered obsolete. King Simeon II remained temporarily but in practice the monarchy's regents are lack substantial influence. He would be deposed in September 1946.

== Coup d'état ==
On the eve of 9 September, army units together with Fatherland Front detachments captured key locations in Sofia, such as the Ministry of War, the Ministry of Internal Affairs, the post, the telegraph, the radio, and the railway station. Early in the morning, the new Prime Minister Kimon Georgiev informed the people on the radio of the shuffle:

With the complete awareness that it is a true and full voice of the popular will, the Fatherland Front assumes in that fateful hour and difficult conditions the government of the country in order to save it from destruction.

On 9 September, on the order of the NOVA commander-in-chief Dobri Terpeshev, all partisan units descended from the mountains and took over villages and cities' governments. In most places, this was not met with much resistance, but in other cases army and police units loyal to the old government put up violent resistance to the Fatherland Front forces. In Sofia, Plovdiv, the region of Pernik, Shumen and Haskovo the old regime's supporters were defeated by military action with the army coming under the effective control of the Fatherland Front. The establishment of the new leadership happened at the latest in Haskovo, where partisans and other antifascists seized the artillery barracks on 12 September, but suffered many casualties, as the negotiations with the commanding officers failed to reach a compromise.

As of 9 September, the Red Army had not reached Sofia but remained in northeastern Bulgaria, as the Bulgarian communists were capable of assuming power without any aid.

== New government ==
The Fatherland Front government included representatives of the BWP, BANU "Pladne", the Bulgarian Social Democratic Workers' Party (Broad Socialists) and Zveno. The former Prime Minister Konstantin Muraviev was arrested, as were Tsar Simeon II's regents, members of the former government, and some army detachment heads. On 10 September, the police was abolished and replaced with a popular militia consisting mainly of recent partisans; 8,130 political prisoners were released from the prisons, and the concentration camps of the former regime (e.g. Gonda voda, Krasto pole, Lebane) were closed down. The fascist organizations were banned, as were their publications. The former regents, Prince Kiril, Bogdan Filov, and Nikola Mihov, were executed on 1 February 1945. On 8 September 1946, a referendum about the further destiny of the monarchy was held. Based on the results of the referendum, Bulgaria was declared People's Republic on 15 September 1946.

== Aftermath ==
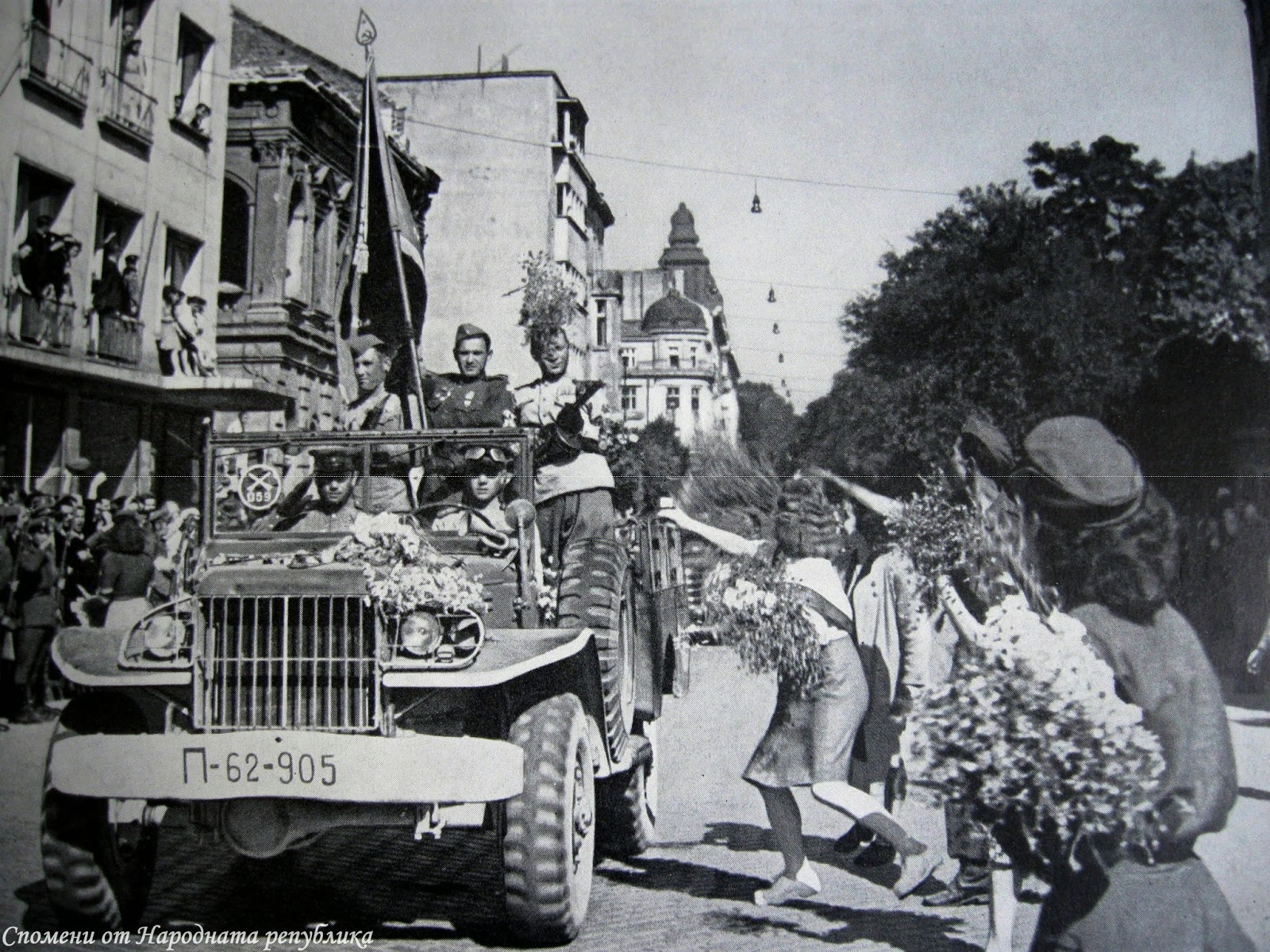
Soviet troops in Sofia, Bulgaria, on 16 September 1944.

After 9 September 1944, the Bulgarian Army joined the Third Ukrainian Front and contributed to the defeat of Nazism in Europe, helping drive out the Germans from much of Yugoslavia and Hungary, reaching as far as Klagenfurt in Austria by April 1945. Although Bulgaria was not recognized as a true member of the Allies, it still managed to retain Southern Dobruja which it had acquired in 1940 per the Treaty of Craiova.

In December 1944, the People's Court was formed by the government of Kimon Georgiev. Its stated goal was to condemn the persons guilty for Bulgaria's participation in World War II. Between 4,000 and 30,000 people were killed or missing in just the first four months after the communist regime overtook Bulgaria.

Later, the Bulgarian Communist Party consolidated its leading role in the ruling Fatherland Front coalition, reducing its members from 5 to 2 political parties (the other being the Agrarian Union), leading to the BCP's sole domination over Bulgarian politics up until 1989.

The Tarnovo Constitution was overthrown and replaced in 1947 by the new pro-communist republican Dimitrov Constitution after the successful republic referendum in 1946.

== See also ==
- People's Republic of Bulgaria
- 1923 Bulgarian coup d'état
- 1934 Bulgarian coup d'état
- Military history of Bulgaria during World War II
- Bulgarian government-in-exile
- Armistice between Italy and Allied armed forces
- King Michael's Coup
- Moscow Armistice and Lapland War
