= Simeon II =

Tsar of Bulgaria from 1943 to 1946, Prime Minister from 2001 to 2005

- Tsar of the Bulgarians
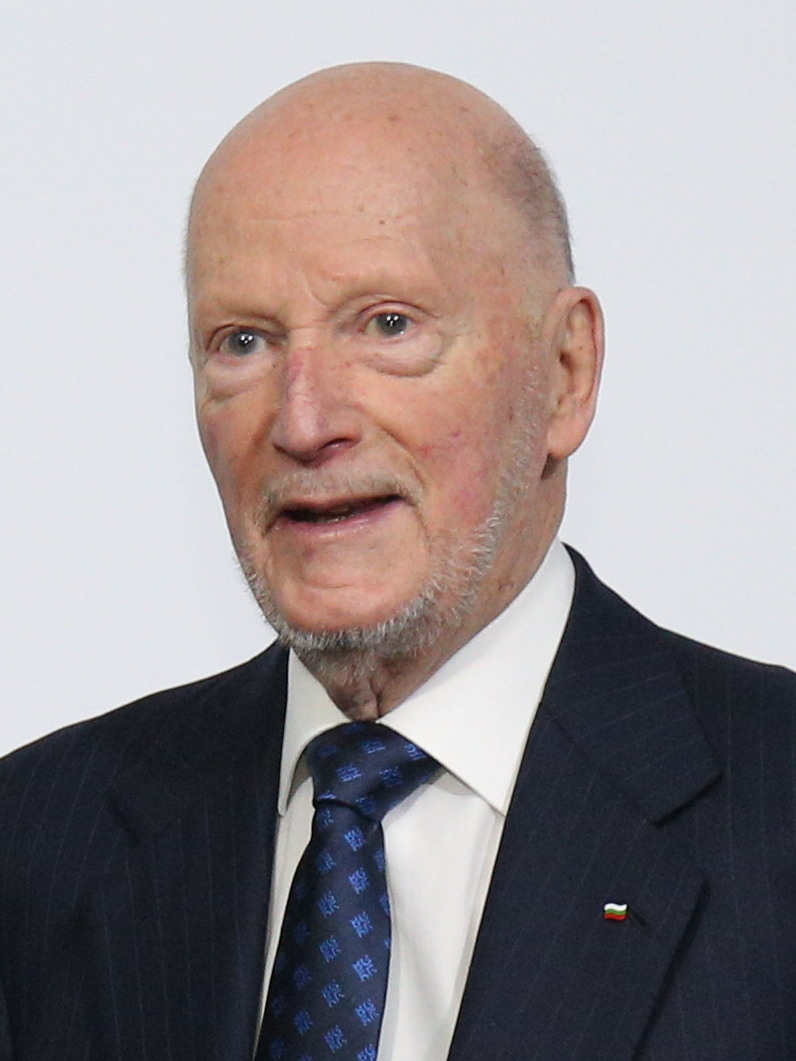
- Simeon in 2018

Prime Minister of Bulgaria
- In office 24 July 2001 – 17 August 2005
- President: Petar Stoyanov; Georgi Parvanov
- Deputy: Nikolay Vasilev; Lydia Shuleva; Kostadin Paskalev; Plamen Panayotov
- Preceded by: Ivan Kostov
- Succeeded by: Sergey Stanishev

Tsar of Bulgaria
- Reign: 28 August 1943 – 15 September 1946
- Predecessor: Boris III
- Successor: Monarchy abolished; Vasil Kolarov as Acting President of Bulgaria
- Regent: See list: 28 August 1943 – 9 September 1944: Prince Kiril; Bogdan Filov; Nikola Mikhov 9 Sep 1944 – 15 September 1946: Todor Pavlov; Venelin Ganev; Tsvetko Boboshevski
- Prime Ministers: See list: Bogdan Filov Petur Gabrovski (Acting) Dobri Bozhilov Ivan Ivanov Bagryanov Konstantin Muraviev Kimon Georgiev

Leader of the National Movement Simeon the Second party (Note: Since 3 June 2007, the National Movement for Stability and Progress party)
- In office 6 April 2001 – 28 November 2009
- Preceded by: Position established
- Succeeded by: Hristina Hristova
- Born: 16 June 1937 (age 89); Princess Clementine Hospital, Sofia, Tsardom of Bulgaria
- Spouse: Margarita Gómez-Acebo y Cejuela (m. 1962)
- Issue: Kardam; Kiril; Kubrat; Konstantin-Assen; Kalina
- House: Saxe-Coburg and Gotha-Koháry
- Father: Boris III of Bulgaria
- Mother: Giovanna of Savoy
- Religion: Eastern Orthodox
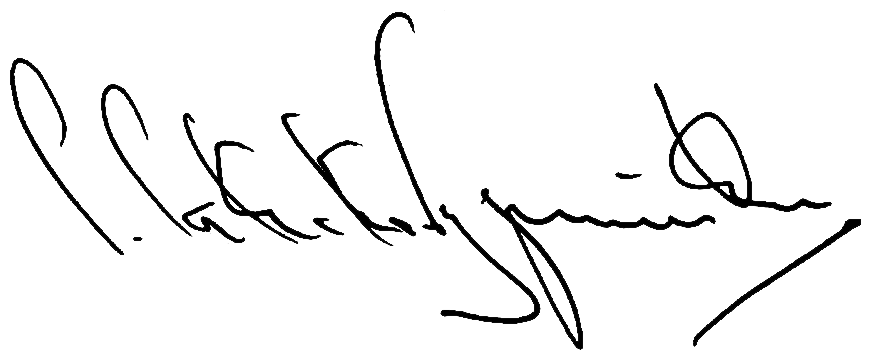
- Signature

Simeon Borisov Saxe-Coburg-Gotha (Note: In this Bulgarian name, the patronymic is Borisov and the family name is Sakskoburggotski.; Bulgarian: Симеон Борисов Сакскобургготски, romanized: Simeon Borisov Sakskoburggotski, pronounced [simeˈɔn boˈrisof sakskoburˈɡɔtski]) (born 16 June 1937) is a Bulgarian politician who was the last Tsar of the Tsardom of Bulgaria as Simeon II (1943–1946) and served as prime minister of the Republic of Bulgaria as Simeon Sakskoburggotski (2001–2005).

Bulgaria joined the Axis Powers in 1941 during World War II, when Simeon was heir apparent to the throne. After the death of his father Boris III, Simeon became Tsar of Bulgaria in 1943. Since he was a minor, a regency council led by his uncle Kiril, Prince of Preslav, General Nikola Mihov and prime minister, Bogdan Filov ran the country on his behalf. Bulgaria lost the war to the Allied Powers and was occupied by the Soviet Union. Simeon was forced into exile in 1946 when the monarchy was abolished by referendum. Simeon lived in Egypt until Francoist Spain granted him asylum in 1951. The Soviet-installed People's Republic of Bulgaria would last until the fall of Communism in Bulgaria in 1990.

In 1996, Simeon returned to Bulgaria and founded the National Movement for Stability and Progress party (NDSV; the acronym can also be read to mean the National Movement Simeon II party). Simeon became Bulgarian prime minister after the NDSV won an absolute majority in the 2001 election. During his term in office, Bulgaria joined the United States' invasion of Iraq in 2003 and joined the North Atlantic Treaty Organization (NATO) in 2004. Simeon's party finished second in the 2005 election, and he led the party into a coalition government with the Bulgarian Socialist Party. The NDSV lost all of its seats in the 2009 election. Simeon retired from politics after this defeat.

As of 2026, Simeon and the 14th Dalai Lama are the only two people alive who were heads of state during World War II; both were symbolic monarchs in regent-led governments.

== Royal history ==
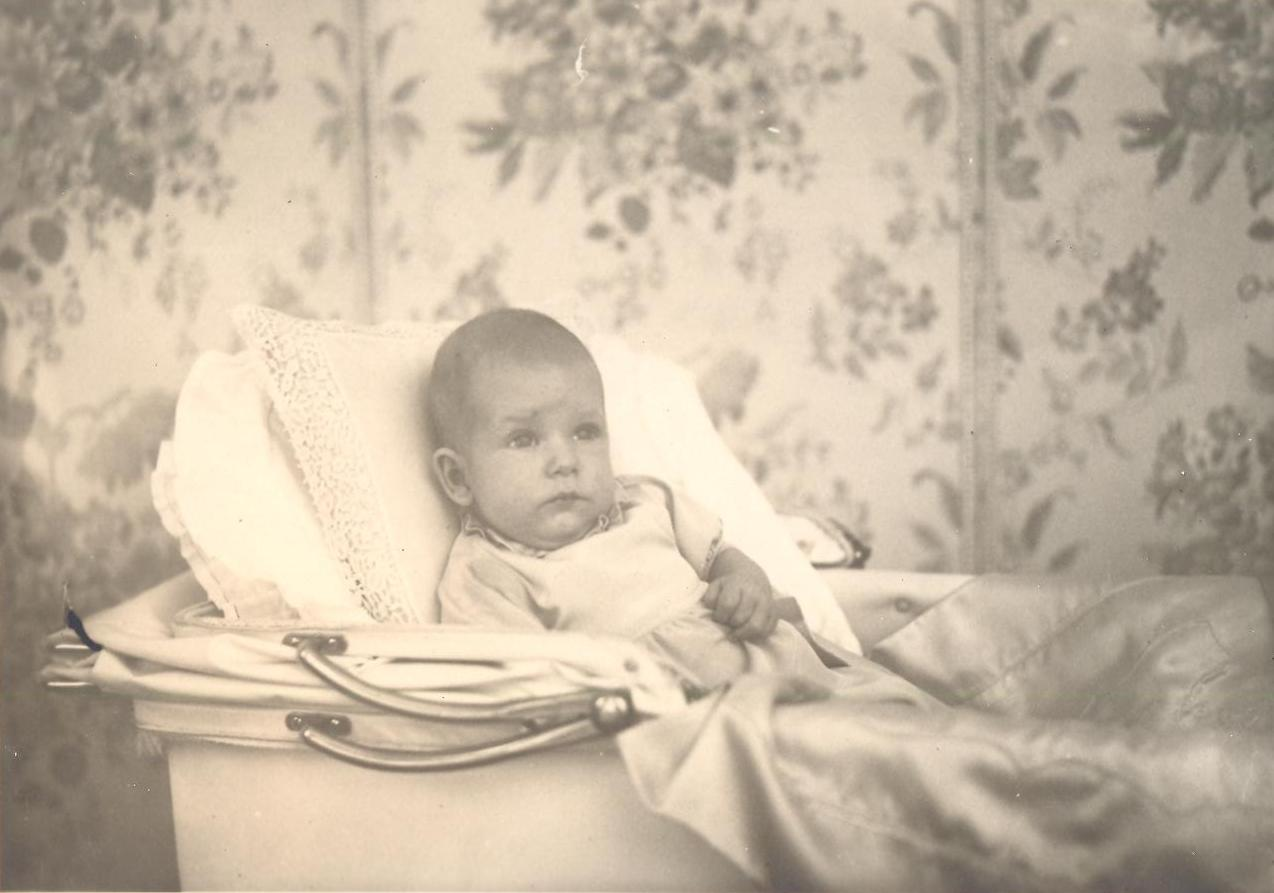
Prince Simeon as a baby

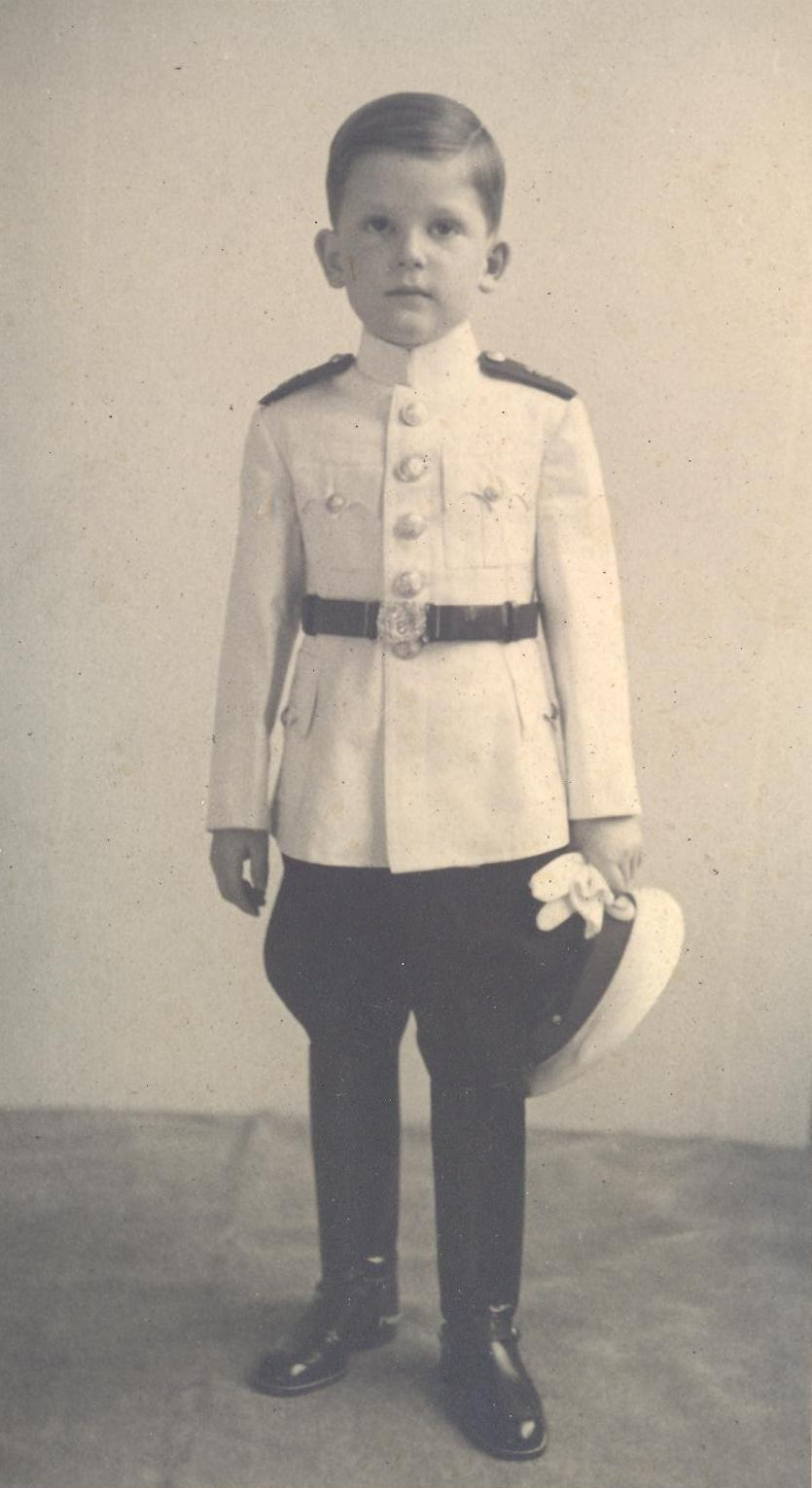
Prince Simeon of Bulgaria

Simeon was born to Boris III of Bulgaria and Giovanna of Italy. Following his birth, Boris III sent an air force officer to the Jordan River to obtain water for Simeon's baptism in the Orthodox faith. He succeeded to the throne on 28 August 1943 upon the death of his father, who had just returned to Bulgaria from a meeting with Adolf Hitler. Since Simeon was only six years old, his uncle Prince Kiril, Prime Minister Bogdan Filov, and Lt. General Nikola Mihov of the Bulgarian Army were appointed regents.

Under his father, Bulgaria joined the Axis powers in World War II but managed to preserve diplomatic relations with the Soviet Union. Still, on 5 September 1944 Stalin declared war on Bulgaria and three days later, the Red Army entered the country without encountering resistance. On the next day, 9 September 1944, Prince Kiril and the other regents were deposed by a Soviet-backed coup and arrested. The three regents, all members of the last three governments, Parliament deputies, heads of the army and eminent journalists were sentenced to death by the Communist dominated People's Court and executed in February 1945.

== Towards exile ==
The royal family — Queen Giovanna, Simeon, and his sister Maria-Louisa — remained at Vrana Palace, near Sofia, while three new regents were appointed (Todor Pavlov, Venelin Ganev and Tsvetko Boboshevski). On 15 September 1946, a referendum was held which proposed abolishing the monarchy and declaring a republic. The referendum was supported by all then legal political parties. Official figures showed a 95.6% approval for ending 68 years of monarchy. This referendum actually violated the Tarnovo Constitution, which held that any change in the form of the state could only be implemented by a Grand National Assembly convened by the tsar.

On 16 September 1946, the royal family was exiled from Bulgaria while given a way to take out large amount of movable property. They first went to Alexandria, Egypt, where Simeon's grandfather Victor Emmanuel III, the former king of Italy, lived in exile. There, in 1951, Simeon studied at Victoria College (along with Crown Prince Leka of Albania). In July 1951, General Francisco Franco's dictatorship in Spain granted asylum to the family. He took part in the ship tour organized by King Paul of Greece and Queen Frederica in 1954, which became known as the "Cruise of the Kings" and was attended by over 100 royals from all over Europe.

== Education and business career ==
In Madrid, Simeon studied at the Lycée Français. On 16 June 1955, upon turning 18, in accordance with the Tarnovo Constitution, Simeon read a proclamation to the Bulgarian people, claiming that he was Tsar of Bulgaria and confirming his will to be Tsar of all Bulgarians and to follow the principles contrary to those of the communist regime then ruling Bulgaria. In 1958, he enrolled at Valley Forge Military College in the United States, where he was known as "Cadet Rylski No. 6883", and graduated as a second lieutenant. Later, Simeon studied law and business administration in Spain between 1959 and 1962.

Simeon then became a businessman. For thirteen years, he was chairman of the Spanish subsidiary of Thomson, a French defense and electronics group. He was also an adviser in the banking, hotel, electronics, and catering sectors.

== Marriage and issue ==
On 21 January 1962, Simeon married Spanish aristocrat, Doña Margarita Gómez-Acebo y Cejuela. The couple had five children – four sons (Kardam, Kiril, Kubrat and Konstantin) and a daughter, Kalina, all of whom subsequently married Spaniards. All of his sons received names of Bulgarian Tsars, his daughter has a Bulgarian name, although only four of his eleven grandchildren have Bulgarian names (Boris, Sofia, Mirko and Simeon).

- Kardam (1962–2015) married Miriam Ungría y López. They had two sons, Boris and Beltran.
- Kiril (born 1964) married María del Rosario Nadal y Fuster de Puigdórfila. They have three children: Mafalda, Olimpia and Tassilo.
- Kubrat (born 1965) married Carla María de la Soledad Royo-Villanova y Urrestarazu. They have three sons: Mirko, Lukás and Tirso.
- Konstantin-Assen (born 1967) married María García de la Rasilla y Gortázar. They have twins, Umberto and Sofia.
- Kalina (born 1972) married Antonio José "Kitín" Muñoz y Valcárcel. They have a son, Prince Simeon Hassan.

== Political return ==
In 1990, just months after the fall of communism, Simeon was issued a new Bulgarian passport. In 1996, fifty years after the abolition of the monarchy, Simeon returned to Bulgaria and was met in many places by crowds of approval. He did not, at that point, make any political announcements or moves, as he had already denied in a TV interview (1990) to have any material property claims against Bulgaria.

In 2001, Simeon, who had by this time taken the name Simeon Borisov Saxe-Coburg-Gotha, announced he would return to Bulgaria to form a new political party, the National Movement Simeon II (later renamed to NMSP), dedicated to "reforms and political integrity." Simeon promised that in 800 days the Bulgarian people would feel tangible positive effects of his government and would enjoy significantly higher standards of living.

=== Prime minister ===
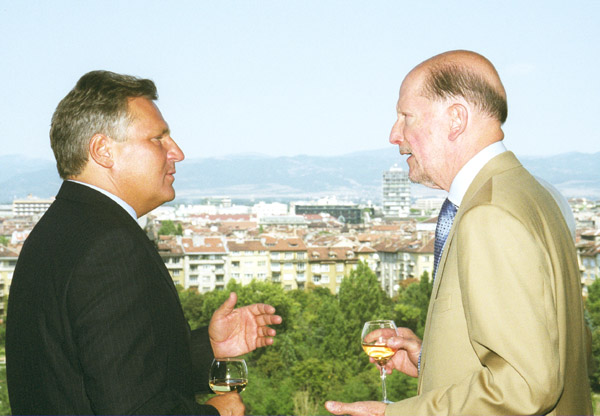
President of Poland Aleksander Kwasniewski and Simeon on 28 August 2003

NMSP won a large victory in the parliamentary elections held on 17 June 2001, capturing 120 of the 240 seats in Parliament and defeating the two main pre-existing political parties. Simeon was sworn in as Prime Minister of Bulgaria on 24 July, forming a coalition with the ethnic Turkish-led party, Movement for Rights and Freedoms (MRF). He gave ministerial positions in his government mainly to technocrats and Western-educated economic specialists. During his time in power, he received the Path to Peace Award from the Path to Peace Foundation in 2002. Bulgaria next joined NATO and joined the U.S.-led coalition against Iraq.

=== Subsequent political career ===
In the 2005 elections, Simeon's party ranked second and participated in the grand coalition government led by the Bulgarian Socialist Party and including the Movement for Rights and Freedoms. Simeon was given the unofficial ceremonial post of Chairman of the Coalition Council. In the 2009 elections, the party got just 3.01% of the votes and no parliamentary seats. Shortly after, on 6 July, Simeon also resigned as NMSP leader.

== Views on restoration of the Bulgarian monarchy ==
Simeon used the title "Tsar of the Bulgarians" in his political statements during his exile. Since returning to Bulgaria, he consistently avoided revealing his views on the restoration of the Bulgarian monarchy, notwithstanding the original name of his party. Upon taking office as Prime Minister, Simeon swore to uphold the republican constitution. Otherwise he has not renounced the family's claim to any restoration of the Bulgarian monarchy.

== Autobiography ==
Simeon wrote an autobiography in French under the title Siméon II de Bulgarie, un destin singulier that was released in Bulgaria on 28 October 2014. It was first presented at the headquarters of the UNESCO in Paris on 22 October 2014.

== Titles and styles ==
- 16 June 1937 – 28 August 1943: His Royal Highness The Prince of Turnovo
- 28 August 1943 – 15 September 1946: His Majesty The Tsar of the Bulgarians
- 15 September 1946 – present: His Majesty Tsar Simeon II of the Bulgarians (title of pretense and by courtesy)
- 24 July 2001 – 17 August 2005: His Excellency Simeon Saxe-Coburg-Gotha

In a statement published on its website on 1 May 2015, the Bulgarian Patriarchate announced that Simeon Saxe-Coburg-Gotha will be referred to as Tsar of Bulgaria in all public and private services held in the dioceses of the Bulgarian Orthodox Church.

=== Dynastic honours ===
- (Tsardom of Bulgaria (1908–1946)) House of Saxe-Coburg-Gotha-Koháry: Knight and Grand Master of the Order of Saints Cyril and Methodius
- (Tsardom of Bulgaria (1908–1946)) House of Saxe-Coburg-Gotha-Koháry: Grand Master of the Royal Order of Saint Alexander
- (Tsardom of Bulgaria (1908–1946)) House of Saxe-Coburg-Gotha-Koháry: Grand Master of the Royal Order of Bravery
- (Tsardom of Bulgaria (1908–1946)) House of Saxe-Coburg-Gotha-Koháry: Grand Master of the Royal Order of Civil Merit
- (Tsardom of Bulgaria (1908–1946)) House of Saxe-Coburg-Gotha-Koháry: Grand Master of the Royal Order of Military Merit
- (Tsardom of Bulgaria (1908–1946)) House of Saxe-Coburg-Gotha-Koháry: Recipient of the Coming of age Medal of Tsar Simeon II

=== National state honours ===
- Bulgaria: Grand Cross of the Order of Stara Planina
- (Bulgaria) Bulgarian Ministry of Defence: Collar of the Order of Justice

=== Foreign state and dynastic honours ===
- Belgium: Knight Grand Cross of the Order of the Crown
- France: Grand Cross of the Order of the Legion of Honour
  - (France) House of Orléans: Knight Grand Cross of the Order of Saint Lazarus
- (Greece) Greek royal family: Knight Grand Cross of the Royal Order of the Redeemer
- (Kingdom of Italy) Italian royal family: Knight of the Supreme Order of the Most Holy Annunciation
- Vatican: Knight Grand Cross of the Order of the Holy Sepulchre
- Sovereign Military Order of Malta: Bailiff Knight Grand Cross of Honour and Devotion of the Order of Saint John
- (Kingdom of the Two Sicilies) Two Sicilian royal family:
  - Knight of the Royal Order of Saint Januarius
  - Bailiff Knight Grand Cross of the Two Sicilian Royal Sacred Military Order of Saint George
- Japan: Grand Cordon of the Order of the Rising Sun
- Jordan: Knight Grand Cordon, Special Class of the Supreme Order of the Renaissance
- Jordan: Knight Grand Cordon of the Order of Independence
- Palestine: Grand Cordon with Collar of the Order of Palestine
- (Kingdom of Portugal) Portuguese royal family: Knight Grand Cross of the Order of the Immaculate Conception of Vila Viçosa
- (Russian Empire) Russian imperial family: Knight of the Imperial Order of Saint Andrew
- Spain:
  - Knight Grand Cross of the Order of Charles III
  - Knight of the Order of the Golden Fleece

=== National awards ===
- Bulgaria: Honorary degree of the National Guards Unit of Bulgaria
- Bulgaria: Jubilee badge of honour of the Bulgarian Chitalishte community

=== Foreign awards ===
- European Union: Paneuropean Union integration award
- Romania: Honorary degree of the University of Bucharest
- Spain: Adoptive Son of Madrid

=== Arms ===
Arms of the Sovereign of Bulgaria (1943–1946)	Personal arms of Simeon

=== Patronages ===
==== National patronages ====
- Bulgaria: Patron of the National day of Bulgaria

== See also ==
- The Boy Who Was a King, a 2011 Bulgarian documentary by Andrey Paounov.
- House of Saxe-Coburg and Gotha

== Bibliography ==
- Ramon Perez-Maura, El rey possible: Simeon de Bulgaria, Belacqua, Madrid, 2002 (ISBN 8495894238)
- Simeon II de Bulgarie, Sébastien de Courtois, Un destin singulier, Flammarion, 2014 (ISBN 9782081314672)

=== Books ===
In addition to the books listed in the References, the following may be mentioned:

- Walter J.R. Curley, Monarchs in Waiting. London: Hutchinson & Co., 1975. (pp. 23–25: "Bulgaria: His Majesty King Simeon II")
- Pashanko Dimitroff, Boris III of Bulgaria 1894–1943. London, 1986. ISBN 0-86332-140-2
- Charles Fenyvesi, Royalty in Exile. London: Robson Books, 1981. (pp. 153–171: "Czar Simeon of the Bulgars") ISBN 0-86051-131-6
- Stephane Groueff Crown of Thorns, Lanham MD. and London, 1987. ISBN 0-8191-5778-3
- Gregory Lauder-Frost, The Betrayal of Bulgaria, Monarchist League Policy Paper, London, 1989.
- Robert K. Massie and Jeffrey Firestone, The Last Courts of Europe. New York: Greenwich House, 1983. ISBN 0-517-41472-4
- Lilov, Grigor (2013). Най-богатите българи (1st ed.). Sofia: "Кайлас" ЕООД. ISBN 978-954-92098-9-1.

=== Articles ===
- The Daily Telegraph, Obituary for "HM Queen Ioanna of the Bulgarians", London, 28 February 2000.

Simeon II House of Saxe-Coburg and Gotha Cadet branch of the House of Wettin Born: 16 June 1937
Regnal titles
Preceded by Boris III of Bulgaria	Tsar of Bulgaria; 1943–1946	Vacant Republic declared under Vasil Kolarov
Political offices
Preceded by Ivan Kostov	Prime Minister of Bulgaria; 2001–2005	Succeeded by Sergei Stanishev
