= Todor Pavlov =

Bulgarian philosopher and politician (1890–1977)

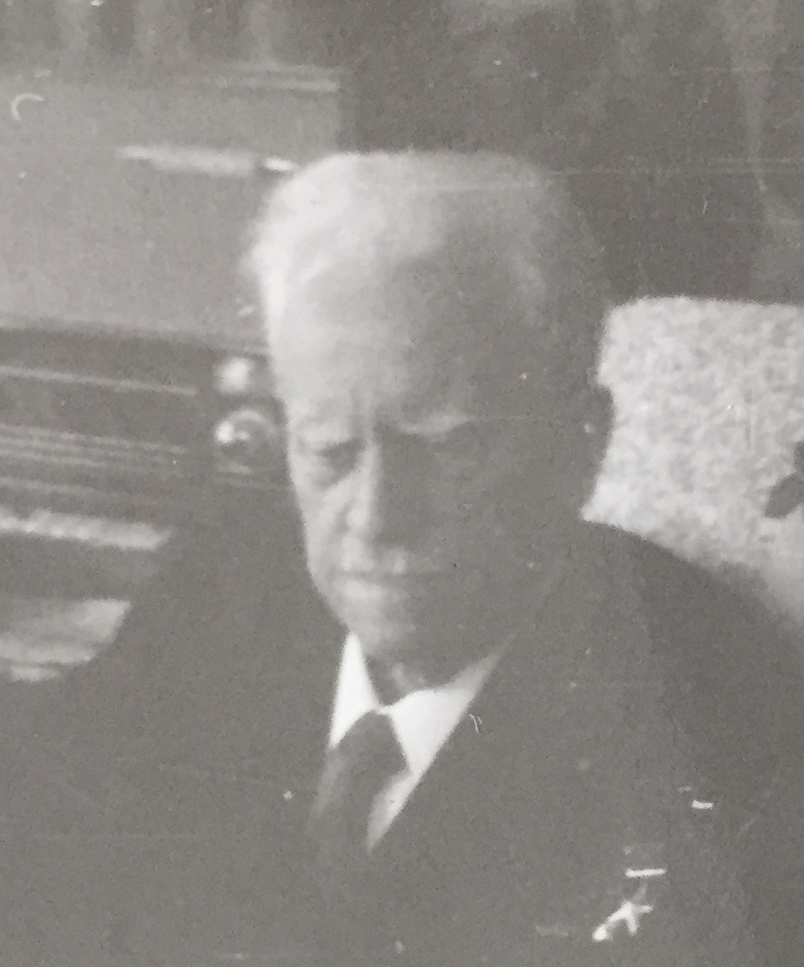
Todor Pavlov

Todor Dimitrov Pavlov (Bulgarian: Тодор Димитров Павлов; 14 February 1890 in Štip, Kosovo Vilayet, Ottoman Empire – 8 May 1977, Sofia, Bulgaria) was a Bulgarian Marxist philosopher, politician, journalist and Prominent figure of the Bulgarian Communist Party.

He was one of the three regents for the underage Simeon II from 1944 to 1946. From 1947 to 1962 he was the president of the Bulgarian Academy of Sciences.
