= Tsvetko Boboshevski =

Bulgarian politician (born 1884)

- Цвятко Бобошевски
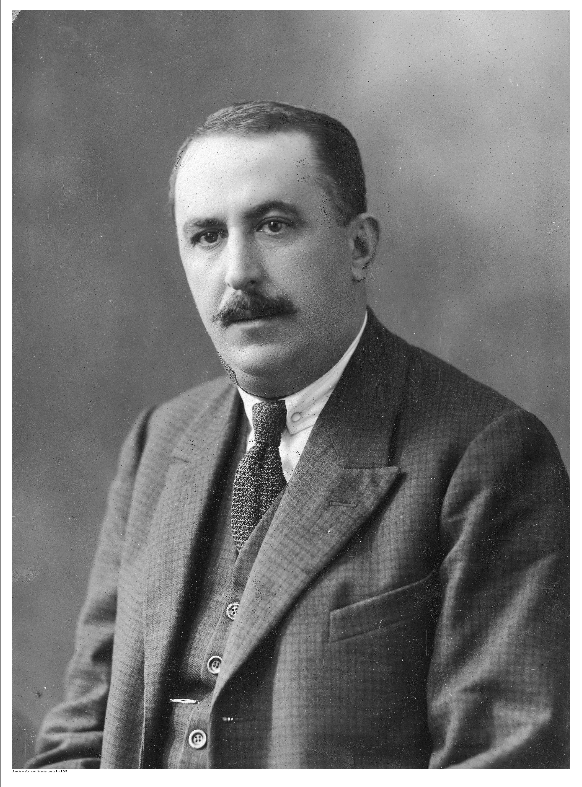
- Boboshevski in 1924
- Born: 20 July 1884; Vratsa, Principality of Bulgaria
- Died: 23 December 1952 (aged 68); Sofia, People's Republic of Bulgaria
- Occupation(s): Lawyer and Bulgarian politician

Tsvetko Petrov Boboshevski (Bulgarian: Цвятко Петров Бобошевски) was Regent of Bulgaria for the underage Simeon II from 1944 to 1946. The first name is also transliterated as Tsvyatko.
