= Margarita Saxe-Coburg-Gotha =

Margarita Gómez-Acebo y Cejuela
- Tsaritsa of Bulgaria (titular)
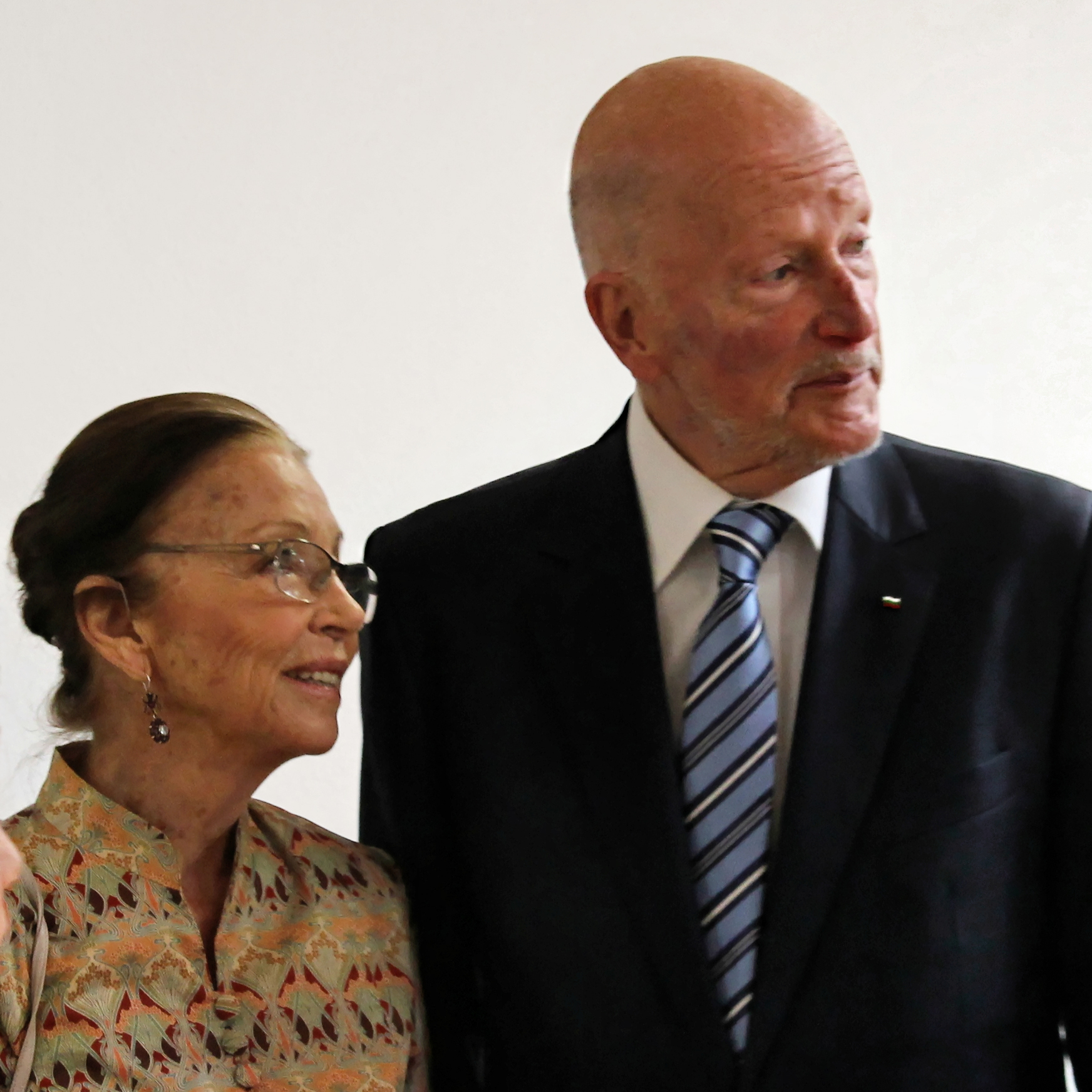
- Margarita and Simeon in 2017
- Born: 6 January 1935 (age 91); Madrid, Spanish Republic
- Spouse: Simeon II of Bulgaria (m. 1962)
- Issue: Kardam, Prince of Turnovo; Kyril, Prince of Preslav; Kubrat, Prince of Panagyurishte; Konstantin-Assen, Prince of Vidin; Princess Kalina, Countess of Murány
- Father: Manuel Gómez-Acebo y Modet, 4th Marquess of Cortina
- Mother: María de las Mercedes Cejuela y Fernández
- Religion: Bulgarian Orthodox prev. Roman Catholic

Margarita Gómez-Acebo y Cejuela (Bulgarian: Маргарита Гомес-Асебо и Сехуела Сакскобургготска, Margarita Gomes-Asebo i Sekhuela Sakskoburggotska; born 6 January 1935) is the wife of Tsar Simeon II of Bulgaria, whom she married after he went into exile. As such, she is also sometimes styled Tsaritsa Margarita; in this context, she may be styled as Princess of Saxe-Coburg and Gotha and Duchess in Saxony, due to her husband's descent from those former ruling families. During her husband's tenure as Prime Minister of Bulgaria, she was sometimes referred as Margarita Saxe-Coburg-Gotha. The current Bulgarian government does not recognize the titles in exile of the former Bulgarian royal family.

== Early life ==
=== Birth ===
Margarita Gómez-Acebo y Cejuela was born on 6 January 1935 in Villa Alba, Collado Villalba, Madrid, during the Second Spanish Republic, as the second child and only daughter of the two children of Spanish nobles: Manuel Gómez-Acebo y Modet, 4th Marquess of Cortina, a state counsellor and lawyer of commercial and banking companies (eldest child of José Gómez Acebo y Cortina, 3rd Marquess of Cortina and wife Margarita Marta Modet y Almagro) and wife María de las Mercedes Cejuela y Fernández (daughter of Manuel Cejuela y González-Orduña and wife María de las Mercedes Fernández Molano).

=== Childhood ===
In 1936, at the outset of the Spanish Civil War Margarita's parents Manuel and María de las Mercedes as well as her maternal grandmother María de las Mercedes were arrested by the Communists and given a three-month prison detention. They were executed in November (Manuel on 9 November and María de las Mercedes and her mother María de las Mercedes on 16 November) at their farm "La Arbodela" in Collado Villalba. In recognition of their parents' murders, Margarita and her elder brother José-Luis (1930–2010) both received the Suffering for the Motherland Medal from Francoist Spain.

After the death of their parents, Margarita and José-Luis continued to live at Villa Alba for some time until they were taken in by their father's close friend, the marquess of Casa Pissaro until May 1937, when the siblings were to go to northern Spain, but due to the war were instead forced to follow a route via Valencia to Barcelona and then to France to stay with their paternal grandmother, Doña Margarita Marta Modet y Almagro, until her death in 1940. They were then taken in by their paternal uncle, Don Juan Gómez-Acebo y Modet, Marquess of Zurgena, and his family until his death, when they moved in with their other paternal uncle, Don Jaime Gómez-Acebo y Modet, and his wife, Doña Isabel Duque de Estrada y Vereterra, 9th Marchioness of Deleitosa, as well as their children, including Don Luis Gómez-Acebo (later husband of Infanta Pilar of Spain, Duchess of Badajoz, eldest sister of King Juan Carlos I of Spain and aunt of King Felipe VI.

== Residence ==
Simeon and Margarita currently reside in what was Simeon's boyhood home, Vrana Palace, near Sofia. It was returned to them by the Bulgarian Constitutional Court. The property is operated under an agreement with the Municipality of Sofia, which allows the use of part of the estate as a public park; in return, the remainder and residence have reverted to the ownership of the family. The legality of this transaction is disputed by Bulgarian politicians in spite of the settled approval sentenced by the Constitutional Court.

== Marriage and family ==
On 21 January 1962, Doña Margarita married Simeon Saxe-Coburg-Gotha, the former tsar of Bulgaria. Simeon and Margarita have five children:

- Kardam, Prince of Tarnovo (2 December 1962–7 April 2015); married Doña Míriam Ungría y López, styled HRH Princess Míriam of Bulgaria. They have two sons: Princes Boris and Beltran.
- Kyril, Prince of Preslav (born 11 July 1964); married Doña María del Rosario Nadal y Fuster de Puigdórfila, styled HRH Princess Rosario of Bulgaria. They have two daughters, Princesses Mafalda and Olimpia, and one son, Prince Tassilo.
- Kubrat, Prince of Panagyurishte (born 5 November 1965). Married Doña Carla María de la Soledad Royo-Villanova y Urrestarazu, styled HRH Princess Carla of Bulgaria, and have three sons, Princes Mirko, Lukás, and Tirso.
- Konstantin-Assen, Prince of Vidin (born 5 December 1967). Married Doña María García de la Rasilla y Gortázar, styled HRH Princess Maria of Bulgaria, and have twins, Prince Umberto and Princess Sofia.
- Princess Kalina of Bulgaria, Countess of Murány (born 19 January 1972). Married Don Antonio José "Kitín" Muñoz y Valcárcel, and has a son, Don Simeón Hassán Muñoz y de Sajonia-Coburgo-Gotha.

== Honours and awards ==
=== National ===
- Spain: Dame Grand Cross of the Order of Civil Merit
- Spain: Recipient of the Suffering for the Motherland Medal

=== Dynastic ===
- (Tsardom of Bulgaria (1908–1946)) House of Saxe-Coburg-Gotha-Koháry: Dame Grand Cross with Collar of the Order of Saint Alexander
- (Tsardom of Bulgaria (1908–1946)) House of Saxe-Coburg-Gotha-Koháry: Dame Grand Cross of the Royal Order of Civil Merit

=== Foreign ===
- Sovereign Military Order of Malta: Dame Grand Cross of Honour and Devotion of the Order of Saint John

== Patronages ==
=== National ===
- Bulgaria: Patron of the Bulgarian EuroChild Club
- Bulgaria: Patron of the 'For Life' Cancer Charity

=== Foreign ===
- Germany: Patron of the Business Women's Society BWS
- Switzerland: Patron of the International Women's Club IWC
