= Prince of Tarnovo =

Prince of Tarnovo (Bulgarian: Княз Търновски, romanized: Knyaz Tarnovski) is the title held by the firstborn son of the Bulgarian monarch and is exclusive to the heir to the throne.

Tarnovo (Veliko Tarnovo) served as the old Bulgarian capital and was the strongest Bulgarian fortification during the Middle Ages, specifically between the 12th and 14th centuries. It was the most important political, economic, cultural and religious centre of the empire. In the 14th century, as the Byzantine Empire weakened, Tarnovo proclaimed itself the Third Rome based on its pre-eminent cultural influence in the Balkans and the Slavic Orthodox world.

In 1393, after a vigorous resistance during a 3-month siege, Turnovo fell to the invading Ottoman Empire, leading to the destruction of the entire Bulgarian Tsardom. The Bulgarian tsar Ivan Shishman moved his residence to the castle of Nikopol but retained the title Prince of Tarnovo (Lord of Tarnovo, Bulgarian: Господин Търновски, Gospodin Tarnovski).

In 1593, a Bulgarian noble and a descendant of the medieval Shishman dynasty, Theodore Ballina of Nikopol, assumed the title 'Prince of Tarnovo' while leading the First Tarnovo Uprising against the Ottoman Empire. In 1686, Rostislav Stratimirovic, another descendant and the leader of the Second Tarnovo Uprising, also took the title. During the Third Tarnovo Uprising in 1835, Velcho Atanasov assumed the title.

After he abdicated from the Bulgarian throne, Prince Alexander Battenberg claimed the title Prince of Tarnovo and used it until his death.

In 1894, Boris, the first son of Ferdinand I of Bulgaria, was given the old title 'Prince of Tarnovo' as the Crown Prince and the heir apparent. The royal family continued to use this title after the abolition of the monarchy in 1946. The wife of a Prince of Tarnovo is titled Princess of Tarnovo (Bulgarian: Княгиня Търновска, Knyagina Tarnovska). As of 2015, the current Prince of Tarnovo is Prince Boris, the son of Prince Kardam.

== List ==
People who have held the title Prince of Tarnovo:

Portrait	Name	From	To	Dynasty	Arms
	Prince Ivan	1393	1395	Shishman	
	Prince Theodore	1593	1593	Shishman	
	Prince Rostislav	1686	1686	Shishman	
	Prince Velcho	1835	1835	Atanasov	
	Prince Paraskeva	1815	1821	Hadzhi Lukov	
	Prince Alexander	1886	1893	Hesse	
	Prince Boris	1894	1918	Saxe-Coburg and Gotha	
	Prince Simeon	1937	1943	Saxe-Coburg and Gotha	

== Held in pretense ==
Since the monarchy's abolition, these are the people who have held the title Prince of Tarnovo in pretense:

Portrait	Name	From	To	Dynasty	Arms
	Prince Kardam	1962	2015	Saxe-Coburg and Gotha	
	Prince Boris	2015	—	Saxe-Coburg and Gotha	
