= Georgi Fingov =

Bulgarian architect

Fingov's house, Shipka str., Sofia

Georgi Dimitrov Fingov (Bulgarian: Георги Димитров Фингов; 1874–1944) was a Bulgarian architect who was particularly influenced by French Art Nouveau and is regarded as the first prominent representative of the Bulgarian Secession in architecture. Fingov's works range from private houses though schools and public buildings to royal palaces and hunting lodges for the Bulgarian royal family.

Fingov was born in Kalofer (at the time part of the Ottoman Empire, now in central Bulgaria) to the family of Dimitar Fingov, a Kyiv and Moscow-educated polyglot teacher who was an acquaintance of Hristo Botev and Ivan Vazov. After the Liberation of Bulgaria in 1878, Georgi Fingov's father was briefly governor of Targovishte, Botevgrad and Pleven.

In 1892, Georgi Fingov graduated from the Plovdiv high school and moved to Vienna, Austria-Hungary, to study architecture at what is today the Vienna University of Technology. As a student, Fingov was an assistant of Karl Mayreder at the university and worked in the prominent Austrian architect's studio. Leaving behind prospects of a successful career in Vienna, in 1898 Fingov returned to Bulgaria. In Plovdiv, he established a studio together with the local architect Valkovich. Together, the two designed the building of the Plovdiv French College for Girls. Fingov's separate works in Plovdiv include the Neo-Gothic Protestant church in the city and several residential buildings.

Fingov moved to Sofia, the capital of the Principality of Bulgaria, in 1902. He quickly became the head of the Sofia Municipality department of architecture, where he succeeded Friedrich Grünanger. Fingov was also in charge of royal palaces as a Ministry of Public Works official. He designed the Sitnyakovo mountain lodge and the Tsarska Bistritsa royal hunting lodge, both in Rila, and the smaller of the two palaces at Vrana near Sofia. Fingov also reconstructed the Saint Demetrius Monastery at Euxinograd by Varna. In 1905, Fingov left the Ministry of Public Works to start a private career, which lasted until 1936. As a private architect, Fingov collaborated with several other Bulgarian architects, including Kiro Marichkov, Dimo Nichev, Nikola Yurukov and Georgi Apostolov.

Georgi Fingov was killed in 1944 during the bombing of Sofia in World War II. Fingov's son, Dimitar Fingov, was also an architect. His granddaughter (daughter of his daughter Milka Müller née Fingova), Barbara Müller, is an actress and translator from German to Bulgarian.

== Works ==
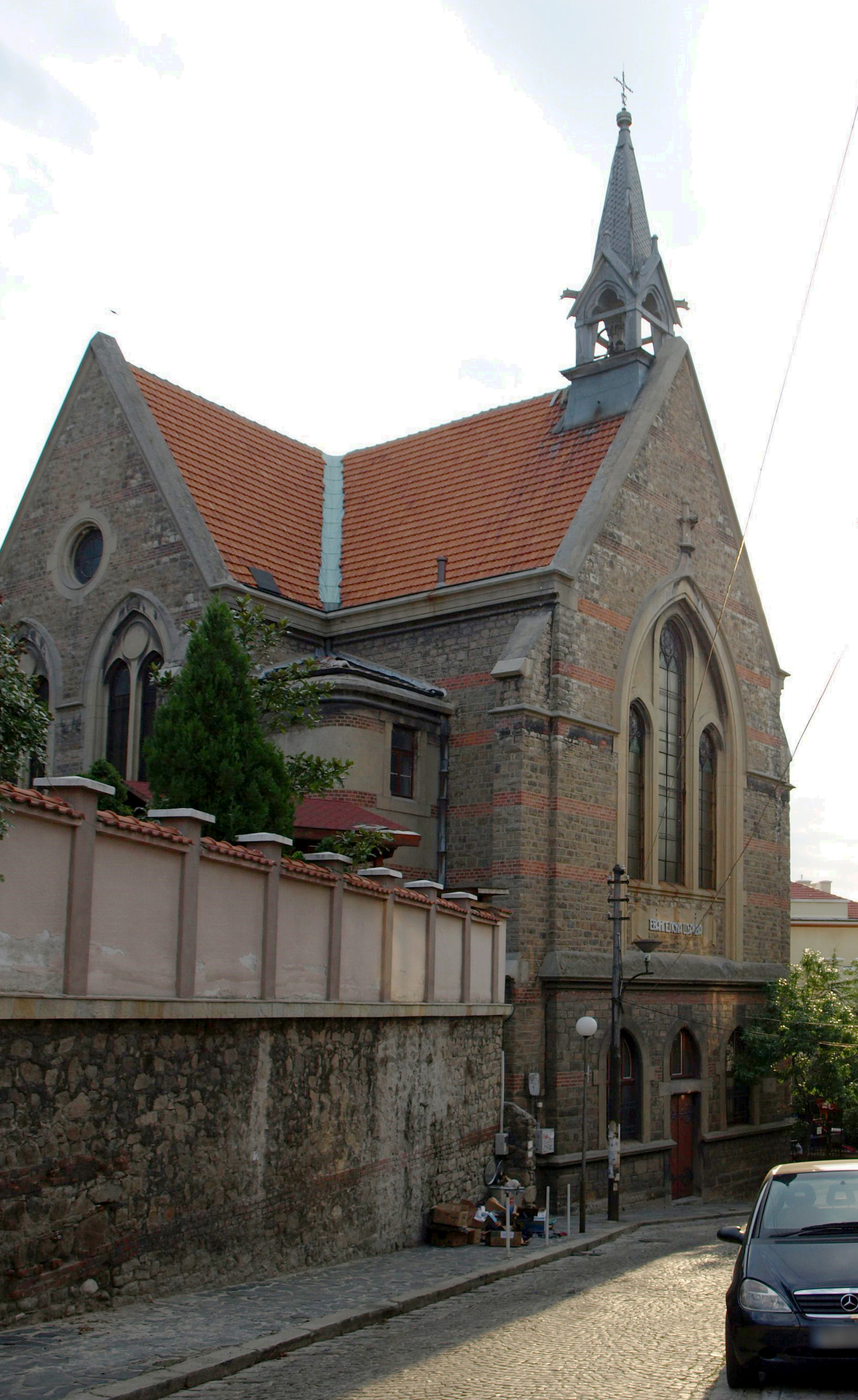
Protestant church in Plovdiv

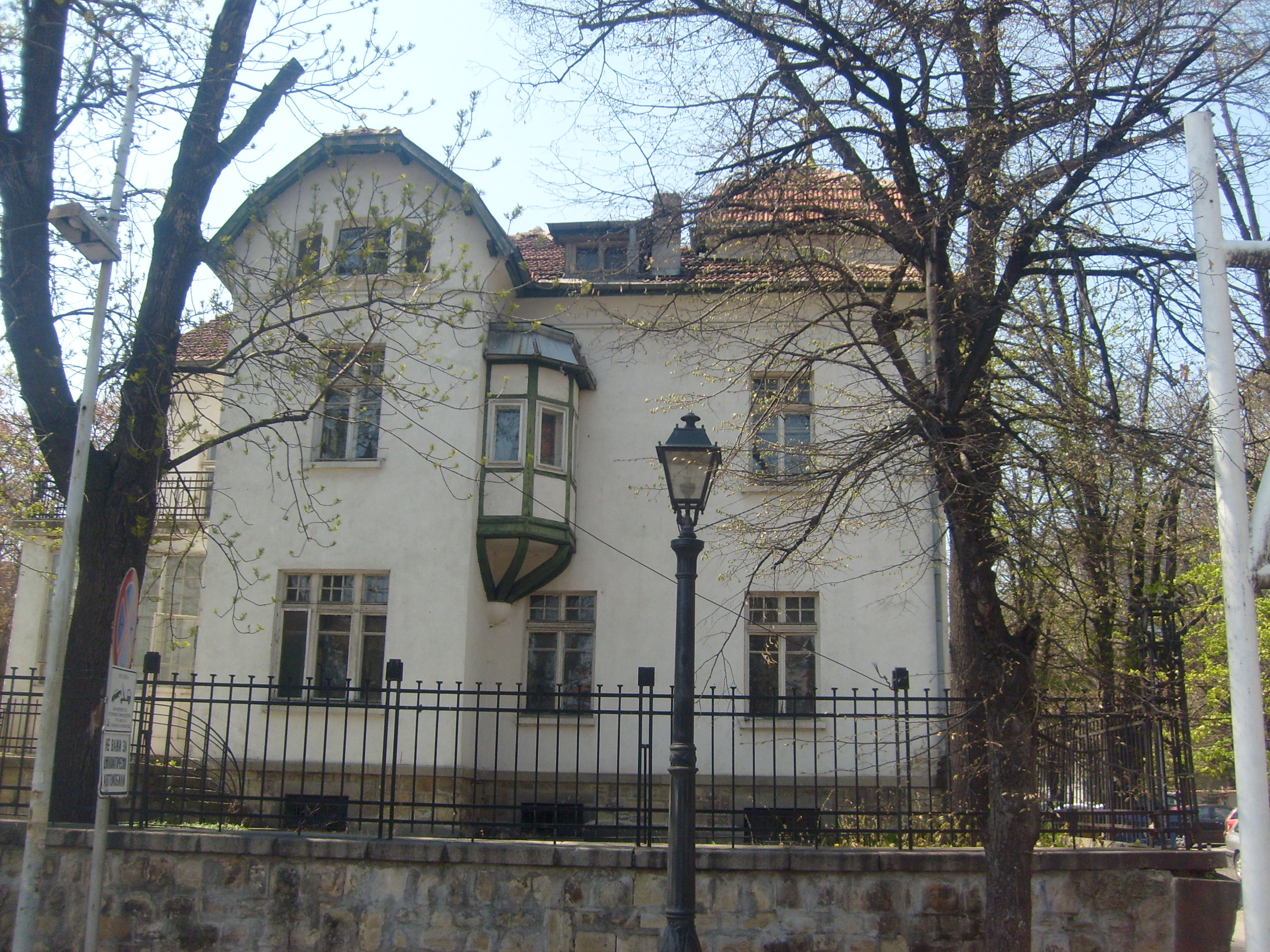
Fingov's House (self-designed) on Shipka Street in Sofia
