= Alžbeta Brezáková =

Third wife of Ferdinand I of Bulgaria (1921–2015)

- Born: 1921; Coburg, Bavaria, Germany
- Died: 24 April 2015 (aged 93–94); Bratislava, Slovakia
- Spouse: Ferdinand I of Bulgaria (m. 1947; died 1948); Imrich Pernický (m. 1949; died 1979)
- Issue: Hildegard Pernická
- House: Saxe-Coburg-Gotha-Koháry (by marriage)
- Father: Juraj Brezák
- Mother: Anna Brezáková

Alžbeta Brezáková (1921 – 24 April 2015) was a Slovak nurse and the third wife of Ferdinand I of Bulgaria. The daughter of a castellan employed by the House of Saxe-Coburg and Gotha-Koháry, she served as a royal nanny and as personal assistant to the deposed Tsar Ferdinand while he lived in exile in Germany. They were secretly married in 1947. She was 60 years younger than her husband and was the first Slovak and the first commoner to marry into the Bulgarian royal family. The validity of their morganatic marriage was questioned by Slovak writer Anton Hykisch, whose family was also employed by the Tsar.

== Biography ==
Brezáková was born in 1921 in Coburg and was of Slovak descent. Her parents, Juraj Brezák and Anna Brezáková, were both employed by the House of Saxe-Coburg and Gotha-Koháry in Coburg. Her father was an orphan and grew up in Muráň under the care of Ferdinand I of Bulgaria, who paid for his education and brought him on hunting trips. Brezáková lived with her parents in Coburg for five years before the family returned to Czechoslovakia.

As an adult, Brezáková lived in the Svätý Anton manor house, where her father served as a castellan for Tsar Ferdinand. In 1936, she began working for Ferdinand as an assistant, overseeing the administrative work of his employees, and as a nanny to his children. She was responsible for arranging the transfer of Ferdinand's library in the Palais Coburg in Vienna to the Svätý Anton manor house.

On 12 August 1947, she married Ferdinand in a secret ceremony in Bamberg. She was the former Tsar's third wife and the first Slovak and commoner to marry into the Bulgarian royal family. At the time of their marriage, she was twenty-six and he was eighty-six. Her husband, who had been deposed in 1918, lived in exile in Germany. The year before their marriage, his grandson Simeon II of Bulgaria, was deposed and the monarchy abolished under the formation of the People's Republic of Bulgaria. Ferdinand died one year after the marriage took place, on 10 September 1948. After his death, Brezáková returned to Slovakia, where she remarried and gave birth to a daughter, named Hildegard. She lived the remainder of her life in a tenement in Komárno. She died in Bratislava on 24 April 2015.

== Validity of royal marriage ==
The Slovak writer Anton Hykisch wrote that he doubted the validity of the marriage between the Tsar and Brezáková. Hykisch wrote that Ferdinand was "very proud of his origins" and that he did not believe the Tsar would enter "into a misalliance marriage." He stated that Ferdinand may have "arranged some theater with church dignitaries" but that no official documents exist regarding the marriage and that after Ferdinand's death, Brezáková did not claim rights to his estate and immediately left Germany for Slovakia, where she remarried.
