= Prince Ghazi bin Muhammad =

Jordanian prince and academic

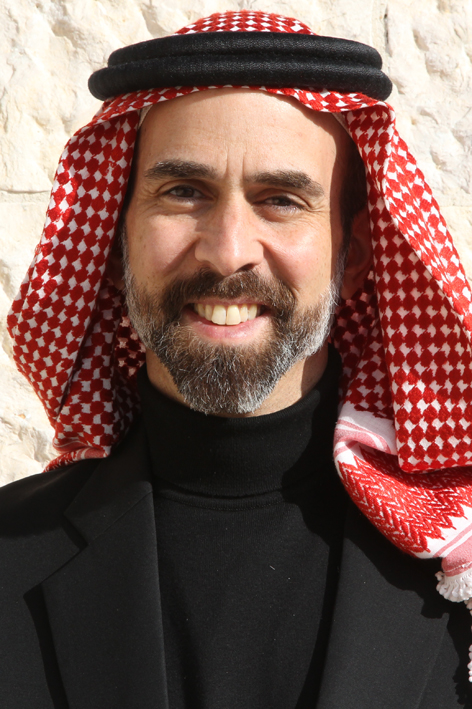
- Born: 15 October 1966 (age 60); Amman, Jordan
- Spouse: Areej Zawawi (m. 1997; div. 2020) Miriam, Dowager Princess of Tarnovo (m. 2022)
- Issue: Princess Tasneem; Prince Abdullah; Princess Jennah; Princess Salsabeel
- House: Hashemite
- Father: Prince Muhammad bin Talal
- Mother: Firyal Irshaid

Prince Ghazi bin Muhammad (born 15 October 1966) is a Jordanian prince and a professor of philosophy. He is the son of Prince Muhammad bin Talal of Jordan and his first wife, Princess Firyal. He is a grandson of King Talal of Jordan and thus a first cousin of King Abdullah II and sixteenth in the line of succession to the Jordanian throne. He is well known for his religious initiatives, about which a book was published in 2013. He is also the step-father of the heir to the defunct Bulgarian throne, through his second marriage to Míriam Ungría López, Dowager Princess of Tarnovo.

== Education ==
He attended Harrow School (1979–1984) for his 'O' and 'A' Levels.

He graduated with highest honors and an A.B. in comparative literature from Princeton University in 1988 after completing a 59-page senior thesis titled "Le Jeu de Trois Contes".

He received his PhD (Cantab.) in Modern and Medieval Languages and Literatures (July 1993) with a thesis titled, "What is Falling in Love?: A Study of the Literary Archetype of Love."

University of Cambridge (Trinity College): (1988–1989; 1990–1993)

He attended Al-Azhar University, College of Usul al-Din, Cairo (2007–2010) receiving his PhD ('Alimmayah) in Islamic Philosophy, awarded highest honors on January 16, 2010, with thesis title: Love in the Holy Qur'an.

== Marriage and family ==
In 1997, Prince Ghazi married Areej bint Omar Al Zawawi, and the couple had four children:

- Princess Tasneem
- Prince Abdullah
- Princess Jennah
- Princess Salsabeel

Prince Ghazi and Princess Areej divorced in 2020. In September 2022, Prince Ghazi married Princess Miriam, widow of the late Prince of Tarnovo.

== Activities ==
=== Official work ===
- Chief Advisor to King Abdullah II for Religious and Cultural Affairs and Personal Envoy of King Abdullah II. (October 6, 2011 to present; pro bono publica; retired from Gov.)
- Special Advisor to and Personal Envoy of King Abdullah II of Jordan. (October 6, 2003 to October 5, 2011; Retired from gov.)
- Advisor for Tribal Affairs and Cultural Secretary to King Abdullah II of Jordan. (From February 7, 1999, until October 6, 2003.)
- Advisor to King Hussein of Jordan for Tribal Affairs. (July 2, 1998 to February 7, 1999.) (in addition to the post of Cultural Secretary).
- Cultural Secretary to King Hussein of Jordan. (October 4, 1994 to February 7, 1999.)
- Officer in the Royal Jordanian Desert Police Force (June 1989 – December 1992):

Promoted to First Lieutenant (November 14, 1992). Commissioned as a Second Lieutenant (November 1989).

=== Other official activities ===
==== In religious affairs ====
- The Hashemite Fund for the Building and Maintenance of the Blessed Aqsa Mosque and the Noble Dome of the Rock:

Chairman of the Board of Trustees (June 16, 2007 to present),

- The Royal Steering Committee for the Amman Message Islamic Initiative

Chairman of the Committee (May 2005 to present)

- The Royal Aal al-Bayt Institute for Islamic Thought

Chairman of Board of Trustees (August 2000 to present).
Founder and Chairman of the Board Ex Officio of the World Islamic Sciences and Education University (W.I.S.E.), Amman, Jordan, (March 2008).
Founder and Director of The Great Tafsir Project(November 2000 to present).

- The National Park of the Site of the Baptism of Christ

Founder and Chairman of the Board for the National Park (August 2001 to present).
Founder and Chairman of the Royal Committee (1999–2001).
Founder and Deputy Chairman of the Royal Committee (1997–1999).

- National Committee for Religious Endowments (Awqaf):

Member of Committee (1996 to present).

- Royal Committee for the Building and Restoration of the Tombs of the Prophets and the Companions:

Member of the Committee (1994 to present).

==== In education and cultural affairs ====
- Al-Balqa` Applied University:

Founding Chairman of the Board of Trustees (1996 – May 2010).

- The Royal Commission to Investigate the Conditions and Treatment of Foreign Students in Jordan:

Chairman (September 2004 – January 2005).

- National Examination Council:

Member of Council (1997–2000).

- National Committee for Higher Education:

Chairman of Finance Sub-Committee (1999–2003).
Member of Committee (1994–2003).

- National Committee for Lower Education:

Member of Committee (1994–2003).

==== In tribal affairs and social development ====
- Royal Committee for the Preservation and Development of Camel Livestock:

Founding Chairman of the Committee (2000–2003).

- Committee for Tribal Lands and Claims:

Head of Ministerial Committee (1998–2003).

- Royal Institute for Development and Charitable Works:

Founder and Executive Director and Member of Board of Trustees (1997–2000).

- Royal Committee for the Endowment of Underprivileged Schools and Tribal Areas:

Founding Chairman of Committee (1995–2003).

==== In sports ====
- Jordan Amateur Boxing Association:

President (April–July 1998).

- Jordan Basketball Federation:

Honorary President (1991–1993).
President (1988–1991).

=== Part-time work (in academia) ===
- Professor of Islamic Philosophy at University of Jordan (Faculty of Graduate Studies) (Amman, Jordan).

Appointed as Full Professor on December 12, 2005.

- Associate Professor of Islamic Philosophy at Al al-Bayt University.

Appointed as Associate Professor (May 13, 2002).

- Assistant Research Professor at University of Jordan (Amman, Jordan).

Appointed as Research Professor (May 29, 2000).

=== Discovery of Al-Maghtas ===
The site of baptism of Jesus had been known to be around the Jordan River, but no one knew exactly where. An abandoned site in Jordan overlooking the river, was heavily mined in 1967 due to an acquired front line position during the Six-Day War. In 1994 after the signing of the Israel–Jordan peace treaty, Prince Ghazi who is deeply interested in religious history, was searching the area after a monk convinced him to take a look around of what was thought to be the baptism site. When they found evidence of ruins, that was enough to encourage de-mining and further development. Soon afterwards, there were several archaeological digs, tourists influx and pilgrimage activity, and several papal and state visits. In July 2015, the site was designated as a UNESCO world heritage site and is now known as the most likely location for the baptism of Jesus by John the Baptist.

=== Welcoming Pope Benedict XVI to Amman ===
Prince Ghazi gave the welcoming address on the occasion of the pilgrimage of Pope Benedict XVI in Jordan, May 9, 2009. His wide-ranging speech, during Benedict's visit to the new King Hussein Mosque in Amman, was carried live on Eternal Word Television Network TV. It gave an account of Muslim-Christian relationships, acknowledged the pope's kindness toward Muslims and made an appeal on behalf of Muslim minorities (as on Mindanao). The speech also noted that crusaders had damaged the Christian tribes in Jordan that had preceded Islam by 600 years.

=== World Interfaith Harmony Week ===
On September 23, 2010, King Abdullah II of Jordan proposed a World Interfaith Harmony Week to the UN General Assembly.
On October 20, 2010, Prince Ghazi bin Muhammad, Personal Envoy and Special Advisor of the King of Jordan, presented the proposal – having conceived and written the draft resolution – before the UN General Assembly 34th plenary meeting in New York where it was adopted unanimously. His speech called to those who love God and love the neighbour, or the Good and the neighbour, to coordinate and concentrate their activities in a more effective way.

The misuse or abuse of religions can thus be a cause of world strife, whereas religions should be a great foundation for facilitating world peace. The remedy for this problem can only come from the world’s religions themselves. Religions must be part of the solution, not part of the problem.

=== International Initiative for Islamic Integral Professorial Chairs (IIIPC) ===
On January 30, 2012, in celebration of King Abdullah II's fiftieth birthday, Prince Ghazi launched the International Initiative for Islamic Integral Professorial Chairs (IIIPC). This started with the Integral Chair for the Study of Imam Al-Ghazali's Work, which was established in Jerusalem at the Holy Al-Aqsa Mosque and Al-Quds University, and King Abdullah II ibn Al-Hussein Waqf for the Integral Chair for the Study of Imam Fakhr Al-Din Al-Razi's Work, which was established at the King Hussein bin Talal Mosque, the University of Jordan and W.I.S.E. University. Other Islamic integral professorial chairs are to come.

=== Visiting the Al-Aqsa Mosque ===
On 28 February 2012, during a meeting for the Arab League in Doha, Qatar, Palestinian Authority President Mahmoud Abbas made a plea for Muslims to visit the Holy Al-Aqsa Mosque. On April 18, 2012, Prince Ghazi, accompanied by the Grand Mufti of Egypt Sheikh Ali Goma, broke what had been a 45-year taboo in some parts of the Islamic World (propagated notably by Al-Jazeera-based Sheikh Al-Qaradawi) and visited the Al-Aqsa Mosque in order to pray there and support the beleaguered Muslim community in Jerusalem. The visit was viewed as controversial in Egypt, but set off a change of public opinion in the Islamic World that continues to this day.

During the trip to Jerusalem, the Prince and the Grand Mufti also visited the Church of the Holy Sepulchre. This visit was much appreciated by the Christian community of Jerusalem.

=== International delegation of Muslims and Christians' visit to Nigeria ===
Between 22 and 26 May 2012 an international delegation of Muslims and Christians, sponsored jointly by the Royal Jordanian Aal Al Bayt Institute (RABIIT) and the World Council of Churches (WCC), visited Nigeria. Prince Ghazi headed the Muslim delegation and Revd Dr. Olav Fykse Tveit led the Christian delegation.

The visit was proposed in reaction to the numerous incidents of fierce inter-communal strife which have affected the lives of Nigerians during 2000–2012, and the awareness that Nigeria is the country in the world where the most severe inter-communal violence between Christians and Muslims has been experienced.

The delegation sought to understand the reasons behind this violence. To this end they issued a report entitled 'Report on the Inter-Religious Tensions and Crisis In Nigeria’

== Positions at non-governmental organizations ==
- Member of the Muslim Council of Elders

2014 to present.

- FreeIslamicCalligraphy.com

Founder, 2013.

- The Prince Ghazi Trust for Islamic Thought

Founder and Director, 2012 to present.

- Islamica Magazine

Chairman of the Board of Directors,
June 2008 to 2010.

- Coordinator of the International A Common Word Initiative

January 2008 to present.

== Publications ==
=== Books ===
- A Thinking Person’s Guide to Love (in English) (Turath Publishing), 2023. ISBN 978-1-90-6949-36-5
- A Thinking Person’s Guide to Our Reality (in English) (Turath Publishing), 2023. ISBN 978-1-90-6949-36-5
- The Litanies of Love (in Arabic, with English introduction) (White Thread Press), 2022.
- A Tentative Guide to Islamic Invocations (in English) (Turath Publishing), 2019. ISBN 978-1-906949-35-8
- A Thinking Person’s Guide to the Truly Happy Life (in English) (Turath Publishing), 2018. ISBN 978-1-906949-32-7
- A Tentative Guide to the Themes of the Surahs of the Qur’an (in English) (Turath Publishing), 2018. ISBN 978-1-906949-49-5
- A Thinking Person’s Guide to Islam (in English) (Turath Publishing), UK 2017. ISBN 978-1-906949-30-3
- 100 Books on Islam in English and the End of Orientalism (in English) ITS (Islamic Texts Society), UK 2014. ISBN 978-1-903682-88-3
- The Challenges Facing Arab Christians Today (in English and Arabic) MABDA (The Royal Islamic Strategic Studies Centre) and RUTAB, Jordan 2013
- Searching for Consensus (in English and Arabic) MABDA (The Royal Islamic Strategic Studies Centre) and RUTAB, Jordan 2013
- What is Islam, and Why? (in English) ISBN 978-9957-428-58-7
- Love in the Holy Quran (in English), USA, 2013. ISBN 978-1-903682-84-5
- Love in the Holy Qur'an (in Arabic) (الحب في القرآن الكريم) Dar al-Razi, Jordan, 2010. ISBN 978-9957-8533-7-2
- Al-Insan (Man), (et al.; published, in Arabic, by the Jordanian Ministry of Education as the text-book for the 12th Grade National Curriculum for General Studies, Amman, 2001; revised 2nd edition in 2007)
- The Sacred Origin of Sports and Culture (published by Fons Vitae, KY, USA, 1998). ISBN 1-887752-13-7 (Trans. into Turkish and published by Insan Yayinlari, Istanbul, 2002.)
- Hannibal the Formidable (published by Hesperus Press, 2002). ISBN 978-1843912996.
- The Tribes of Jordan at the Beginning of the Twenty-first Century (published by Turab, Amman, 1999). OCLC 44117926 ASIN B00069WNGO The ISBN printed in the document (9957-8513-1-0) is invalid, causing a checksum error.

=== Co-authored books ===
- War and Peace in Islam: The Uses and Abuses of Jihad (in English) MABDA (The Royal Islamic Strategic Studies Centre) and The Islamic Texts Society, Jordan, 2013. Edited by HRH Prince Ghazi bin Muhammad, Professor Ibrahim Kalin, and Professor Mohammad Hashim Kamali. ISBN 978-1-903682-83-8
- A Common Word, Muslims and Christians on Loving God and Neighbor (Editor with Volf and Yarrington) Eerdmans Publishing House Co. 2010 ISBN 978-0802863805
- True Islam and the Islamic Consensus on the Message of Amman / Kitab Ijma’ Al-Muslimin ‘ala Ihtiram Mathahib al-Din (compiler, editor and author of introduction [in Arabic and English]; The Aal al-Bayt Institute for Islamic Thought, Amman, Jordan, 2006).ISBN 9957-8533-4-1 (Limited 1st, 2nd and rev. 2nd edition published as: The Book of the Schools of Islamic Jurisprudence / Kitab Ihtiram Al-Mathahib; The Aal al-Bayt Institute for Islamic Thought, Amman, Jordan, 2006.)
- The Holy Sites of Jordan (ed.; published by Turab, Amman, 1996; 2nd edition 1999). ISBN 978-9957851323

=== Articles ===
- ‘A Common Word Between Us and You’ (one of 138 signatories [and sole author]); An Open Letter to World Christian Leaders from World Muslim Leaders, October 13, 2007.

‘The appearance of the A Common Word [Open Letter] of 2007 was a landmark in Muslim-Christian relations and it has a unique role in stimulating a discussion at the deepest level across the world.’

— Rowan Williams, the Archbishop of Canterbury, 2010.

- ‘Open Letter to His Holiness Pope Benedict XVI’ (one of 38 signatories [and co-author]; in Islamica, no.18, Los Angeles CA, 2006; issued October 13, 2006).
- ‘The Prophet Muhammad’ (in Islamica, no.16, Los Angeles CA, 2006).

2nd expanded edition, republished in newspapers in Denmark in 2008.

- ‘Truth and Knowledge’, (in The Book of Language, ed. Kabir Helminski, published by The Book Foundation [The Education Project Series] Oxford, U.K., 2006).

== Decorations and awards ==
- Norway: Knight Grand Cross of the Order of Merit in 2020
- Awarded the Grand Cordon of the Order of Hussein bin Ali (Jordan's highest medal—usually reserved only for heads of state) by H.M. King Abdullah II bin Al-Hussein on October 28, 2013
- Awarded International Interfaith Harmony Award by the International Islamic University Malaysia in collaboration with Department of National Unity, Prime Minister's Department, Malaysia and Jamia Ma'din, India 2014.
- (Norway) Nominated for the Nobel Peace Prize 2013
- St Augustine Award, 2012, For Interreligious Dialogue in the Mediterranean, Milan, Italy
- Awarded Russian Order of Friendship Medal, by President Vladimir Putin of Russia, 26/6/2012.
- (Norway) Nominated for the Nobel Peace Prize 2012
- Awarded Badge of the Order of Prince Yaroslav the Wise (3rd Class), by President Viktor Yanukovych of Ukraine, June 2011
- (Norway) Nominated for the Nobel Peace Prize 2011
- (Oman) Awarded the Medal (of the 1st Order) by Sultan Qaboos bin Said on 30/11/2010.
- (Jordan) Awarded the Special Grand Cordon of the Renaissance Medal (Al-Nahdah Al-Murasa’ ) by King Abdullah II on 29/9/2010.
- Awarded an Honorary Ph.D. in education from Al-Balqa Applied University, Jordan on 22/9/2010.
- (Norway) Nominated for the Nobel Peace Prize 2009 for initiating peaceful dialogue between cultures and religions.
- Awarded the Medal of the Holy Sepulcher (of the 1st order) by Patriarch Theophilos III, the Greek Orthodox Patriarch of Jerusalem and the Holy Land on 1/10/2009, and:
- Awarded the Medal of Peace by Patriarch Theophilos III, the Greek Orthodox Patriarch of Jerusalem and the Holy Land on 1/10/2009.
- Awarded the Eugen Biser Award by the Eugen-Biser-Stiftung (Germany) together with Grand Mufti Mustafa Cerić of Bosnia and Sheikh Habib Ali al-Jifri of Yemen, 2008.
- (Jordan) Awarded the Education Medal (of the 1st Order) by King Abdullah II on 5/10/2004.
- (Jordan) Awarded the Grand Cordon of the Supreme Order of the Renaissance (Al-Nahdah) Medal (of the 1st Order) by King Abdullah II on 9/10/2003.
- Awarded the Order of Muhammad Medal (of the 2nd Order) by King Mohammed VI of Morocco on 10/3/2000.
- Made Grand Officier de la Légion d’Honneur (Legion of Honour) by President Chirac of France in 7/1/2000.
- (Jordan) Awarded the Al-Hussein Medal for Distinguished Service (of the 1st Order) by King Abdullah II on 24/8/1999.
- Made Commandeur de la Légion d’Honneur by President Chirac of France on 20/11/1997.
- Made Officier de la Légion d’Honneur by President Chirac of France on 10/3/1997.
- (Jordan) Awarded the rank of Lt. Col. (hon.) in the Jordanian Arab Army by King Hussein on 2/9/1997.
- Awarded the Order of the Star of Jordan (Wisam al-Kawkab al-Urdani) (of the 1st Order) by King Hussein on 13/11/1995.
- (Jordan) Awarded the Grand Cordon of the Order of the State Centennial by King Abdullah on 14/11/2021.

== See also ==
- Amman Message

Royal titles
| Preceded by Prince Muhammad bin Al Talal | Line of succession to the Jordanian throne 18th position | Succeeded by Prince Abdullah bin Al Ghazi |
