= Princess Miriam Ghazi =

Spanish jewellery designer and Jordanian Princess

Míriam
- Princess Míriam Ghazi; Princess of Tarnovo
- Born: Míriam Ungría y López; 2 September 1963 (age 62); Madrid, Spain
- Spouse: Kardam, Prince of Tarnovo (m. 1996; died 2015) Prince Ghazi bin Muhammad (m. 2022)
- Issue: Boris, Prince of Tarnovo; Prince Beltrán
- House: Saxe-Coburg and Gotha-Koháry (by marriage); Hashemite (by marriage)
- Father: Bernardo Ungría y Goiburu
- Mother: María del Carmen López y Oleaga
- Occupation: Gemologist, jewellery designer

Styles of Princess Míriam Ghazi
- Reference style: Her Royal Highness
- Spoken style: Your Royal Highness

Princess Míriam Ghazi of Jordan (born Míriam Ungría López; born 2 September 1963), known during her first marriage as the Princess of Tarnovo, is a Spanish gemologist and jewellery designer. She served as the Director of Fine Jewellery for the Spanish brand Carrera y Carrera, later forming her own brand, MdeU, in 2014.

Through her first marriage to Kardam, Prince of Tarnovo, the eldest son and heir of Simeon II of Bulgaria, she became a member of the Bulgarian royal family. After her husband's death in 2015, her son Prince Boris became the heir apparent to the defunct Bulgarian throne. On 3 September 2022, she married Prince Ghazi bin Muhammad, a first cousin of King Abdullah II bin Al Hussein of Jordan, becoming a member of the Jordanian royal family.

== Early life ==
Míriam was born Míriam Ungría y López on 2 September 1963 in Madrid to Bernardo Ungría y Goiburu and María del Carmen López y Oleaga. She is of Basque descent.

== Career ==
Míriam has a degree in history and geography, with a concentration in art history, from the Complutense University of Madrid. She later studied gemology, jewellery manufacturing, wax molding, gemstone setting and jewellery design at the University of Oviedo's European Centre of Gemology and Jewellery.

In 1991 she launched her first jewellery collection and founded the Spanish Jewellery Appraiser's Association, serving as the association's president.

In 2000 she joined Carrera y Carrera as the brand's director of fine jewellery. She launched the Garden of Roses collection in New York in July 2002.

In 2014 she launched own jewellery line, MdeU. Her collection, including rings, pendants, bracelets and earrings, is sold at El Corte Inglés. In 2017, with support from members of the Jordanian royal family, she opened an exhibition of jewels and MdeU pieces at the Jordan National Gallery of Fine Arts.

In February 2017 Míriam presented her jewellery design collections in Bulgaria for the first time, with a three-day exhibit titled Míriam de Ungría: Exquisite Touch at the Radisson Blu Hotel.

== Personal life ==
On 11 July 1996 she married Kardam, Prince of Tarnovo, the eldest son of Simeon II of Bulgaria and Doña Margarita Gómez-Acebo y Cejuela and heir to the defunct throne of Bulgaria, in an Eastern Orthodox ceremony at St. Andrey and St. Dimitar Orthodox Church in Madrid. Her wedding dress is on display in an exhibit in the Museo del Traje. Upon their marriage, Miriam was titled as Princess of Tarnovo and Duchess in Saxony. They have two sons, Prince Boris and Prince Beltrán.

On 15 August 2008 Míriam and her husband were involved in a serious car accident in El Molar. Miriam was taken to the Hospital Universitario La Paz to be treated for her injuries. Her husband sustained a serious brain injury. Míriam's husband died in 2015.

She lives in South Kensington, London.

On 3 September 2022, Míriam married Prince Ghazi bin Muhammad, a first cousin of King Abdullah II of Jordan, at Raghadan Palace and was given the title of Her Royal Highness Princess Míriam Ghazi.
