= Kyril, Prince of Preslav =

Bulgarian prince (born 1964)

Kyril Кирил
- Prince of Preslav
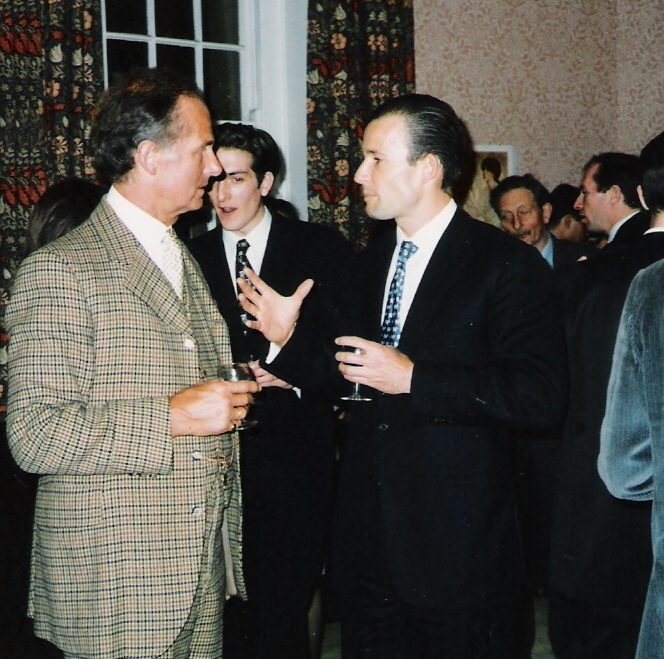
- Kyril (right) with Nikolai Tolstoy, 1996
- Born: 11 July 1964 (age 62); Madrid, Spain
- Spouse: Rosario Nadal (m. 1989; sep. 2009)
- Partner: Katharine Butler
- Issue: Princess Mafalda-Cecilia; Princess Olimpia; Prince Tassilo
Names
- Kyril Sajonia-Coburgo-Gotha Gómez-Acebo (Note: As a Spanish citizen by birth, his legal surname is Sajonia-Coburgo-Gotha Gómez-Acebo, a Hispanicized version of his German paternal surname, Saxe-Coburg and Gotha-Koháry.)
- House: Saxe-Coburg and Gotha-Koháry
- Father: Simeon II of Bulgaria
- Mother: Margarita Gómez-Acebo

Styles of The Prince of Preslav
- Reference style: His Royal Highness
- Spoken style: Your Royal Highness

Kyril, Prince of Preslav, Duke in Saxony (born 11 July 1964), also known as Kyril of Saxe-Coburg, is the second son of Simeon II and Margarita Saxe-Coburg-Gotha. His father, Simeon, served as Tsar of Bulgaria from 1943 to 1946 and Prime Minister of Bulgaria from 2001 to 2005.

== Education and career ==
Kyril was born in Madrid, and graduated from Princeton University with an A.B. in physics in 1986 after completing a senior thesis titled "Velocity distribution of pulsars: a Monte Carlo simulation."

In 2007, he worked for GLG Partners, the London-based asset management branch of Lehman Brothers.

== Marriage and family ==
Kyril married María del Rosario Nadal y Fuster de Puigdórfila, who goes by "Rosario Nadal", on 15 September 1989. Her first cousin, Joaquín Felipe de Puigdórfila y Esteve is the current Count of Olocau.

The religious ceremony was held at Saint Anne's Chapel, Royal Palace of La Almudaina, Palma de Mallorca. The Spanish tabloids ¡Hola! and Semana covered the event and reported that there were 400 guests, though only 125 could be accommodated in the chapel for the religious ceremony. According to Majesty magazine at the time, King Juan Carlos, Queen Sofía, Infanta Elena, Infanta Cristina of Spain, and Felipe VI of Spain attended the occasion.

The couple have three children:

- Princess Mafalda-Cecilia (born 27 July 1994). On 28 May 2022 married civilly Marc Abousleiman in Majorca, separating in 2024.
- Princess Olimpia (born 14 December 1995)
- Prince Tassilo (born 20 January 2002)

Through their mother, Kyril’s children descend from the Aztec Emperor Montezuma II. A former model and muse for the fashion designer Valentino Garavani, Rosario Nadal works professionally as an art consultant. In 2007, she wrote an article for Architectural Digest.

In October 2009, it was announced by the Spanish news agency EFE that, according to a report from an anonymous source close to Simeon of Bulgaria, the couple were going to live separately. The source claimed, however, that they don't presently have any plans or intention to divorce.

The couple appeared together at the wedding of Victoria, Crown Princess of Sweden on 19 June 2010.

== Personal life ==
On 28 October 1987, Kyril escorted fellow Princeton graduate Brooke Shields to a dinner/fashion show hosted by Christian Lacroix in New York City. Until his marriage, Kyril's purported romantic interests were tracked by European celebrity magazines, notably ¡Hola! in Spain.

He owns a vacation residence near Campos, Mallorca, where he is a keen surfer.

He married Rosario Nadal in 1989. They were known to socialize with many celebrities and royalty, such as Gwyneth Paltrow, Hugh Grant, Crown Prince Haakon and Crown Princess Mette-Marit of Norway, as well as the Spanish royal family. They separated in 2009. Since 2017, he has been in a relationship with British businesswoman Katharine Butler.

== Honours ==
=== Dynastic ===
- (Tsardom of Bulgaria (1908–1946)) House of Saxe-Coburg-Gotha-Koháry: Knight Grand Cross of the Order of Saint Alexander

== Notes ==
Kyril, Prince of Preslav House of Saxe-Coburg and Gotha Cadet branch of the House of Wettin Born: 11 July 1964
Bulgarian royalty
Vacant Title last held by Prince Kiril of Bulgaria	Prince of Preslav; 1964–present	Incumbent
Preceded by Prince Beltrán of Bulgaria	Line of succession to the former Bulgarian throne 3rd position	Succeeded by Prince Tassilo of Bulgaria
