= Count of Olocau =

Title of the Spanish nobility

Count of Olocau is a title of the Spanish nobility. Olocau is located in the Spanish province of Valencia.

== List of counts of Olocau ==
- xxxx - xxxx: Joaquin Fuster de Puigdórfila y Zaforteza, 9th Count of Olocau (b. xxxx - d.27 January 1987),
- xxxx - 2011: Felipe Fuster de Puigdórfila y Villalonga, 10th Count of Olocau (b.xxxx - d. 2011)
- 2011–present: Joaquín Fuster de Puigdórfila y Esteve, 11th Count of Olocau

The heiress presumptive is the present holder's eldest daughter, Verónica de Puigdórfila e Itúrregui who is currently living in New York City.

The current Count is the cousin of Rosario, Princess of Preslav.
