= Carrera y Carrera =

Spanish jewelry company

Coordinates: 40.654389°N 3.599269°W

- Type: S.A. (corporation)
- Industry: Jewelers, Silversmiths
- Founded: 1885
- Headquarters: Madrid, Spain
- Area served: Worldwide
- Website: www.carreraycarrera.com

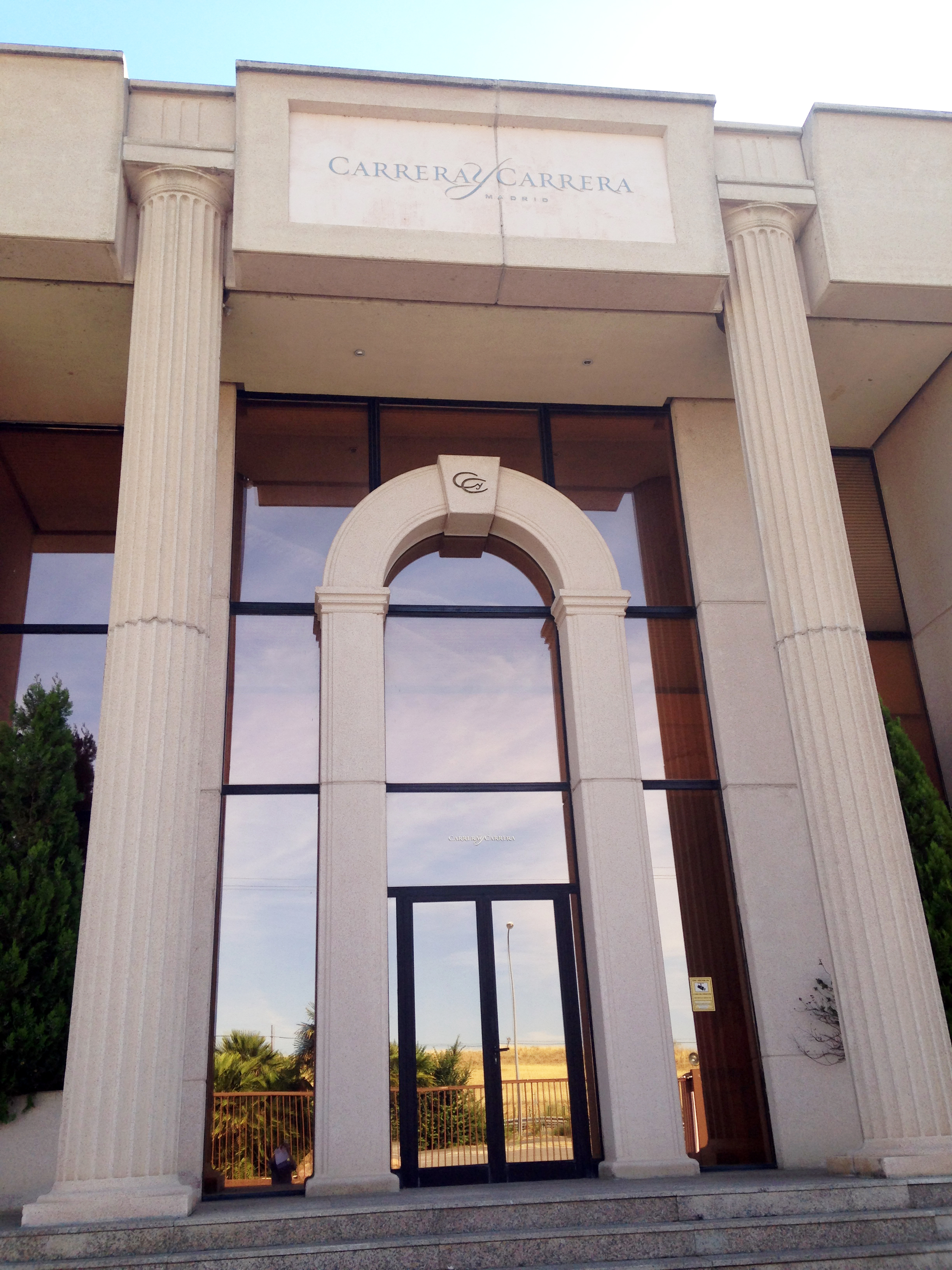
Carrera y Carrera headquarters in San Agustín del Guadalix, Madrid.

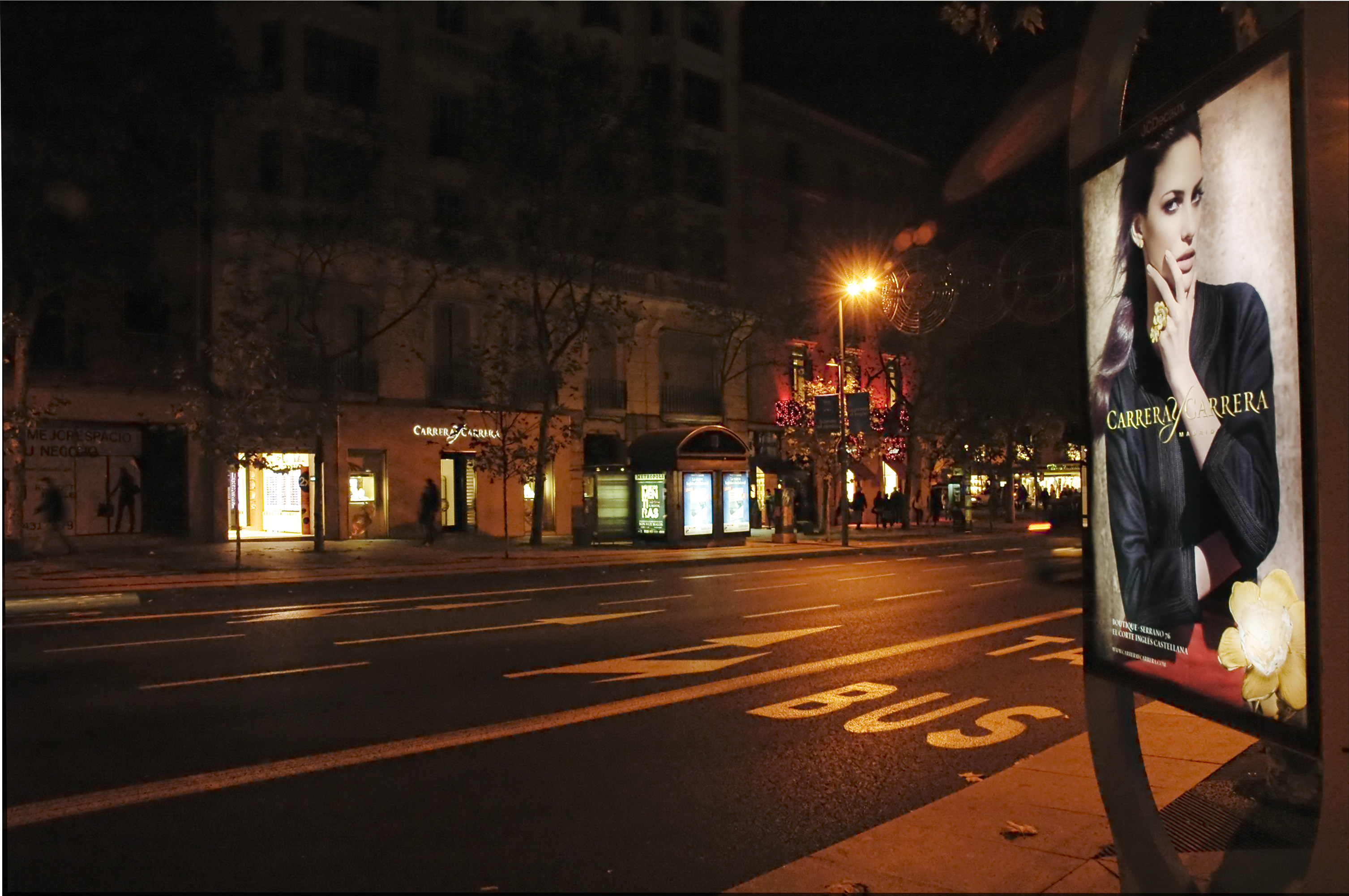
"Carrera y Carrera" boutique on Serrano Street in Madrid.

Carrera y Carrera is a Spanish jewelry company. Headquartered in San Agustín del Guadalix, Madrid, its origins date back to 1885 when Saturio Esteban Carrera opened a small jewelry workshop in the Barrio de las Letras. During the 1970s, his great-grandsons Manuel Carrera and Juan José Carrera created the brand, after which the company has had several owners. Currently the company has subsidiaries in New York City, Tokyo, Moscow, and UAE.

In 2000, Manuel Carrera received a Medal from the Russian Academy of Arts. Currently, the Spanish Academy of Motion Picture Arts and Sciences grants a Carrera y Carrera ring for its Maja de los Goya award during its Goya Awards ceremony. Also the National Academy of Motion Pictures Arts and Sciences of Russia grants with the Golden Eagle Award (Russia) designed by Carrera y Carrera.

== History ==
In 1885 Saturio Esteban Carrera moved from Alcalá de Henares to Madrid and opened a small jewelry workshop in the area known as Barrio de las Letras. His son, José Esteban Carrera, after completing his lapidary studies in Paris in 1920, continued the jewelry tradition in Madrid, which in turn was carried on by his 4 nephews: José, Saturio, Pedro, and Andrés. In the 1970s, Saturio’s great-grandsons Manuel Carrera and Juan José Carrera created the brand; the company has had several owners since then.

In 1960, the company received the commission to make the wedding tiara of Queen Fabiola of Belgium for her royal wedding with King Baudouin of Belgium; after this achievement, the brand was positioned as one of the most recognizable luxury brands internationally. In 1979, Carrera y Carrera expanded to the United States, in 1994 to Russia, and in 2013 it opened its first boutique in China. In 1989, Queen Sofía of Spain was patroness of the presentation in the Royal Palace of Madrid of the sculptural piece “The Ark of Discovery of the Fifth Centennial” that later was exhibited in Madrid’s City Hall. In 1992, the company’s new facilities opened in San Agustín del Guadalix. In 2000, Miriam, Princess of Turnovo, joined the design team. Between 2002 and 2006 Lladró took over control of the company. Manuel Carrera, founder of the brand, once again created collections. In 2019 the company went into judicial liquidation and closed. Models Eugenia Silva, Almudena Fernández, and Alejandra Alonso have been the face of the jewelry house. Celebrities such as Jennifer Lopez, Katy Perry, Demi Moore, Lady GaGa, Olivia Wilde, Olivia Palermo, and Christina Hendricks also regularly wear the brand’s designs.

== Maja de Goya Award ==
In 2010, the Spanish Academy of Arts and Cinematographic Sciences began to grant the "Maja de Goya Award" for which a Carrera y Carrera ring is given to the most elegant actress at the Goya Awards ceremony. The award winners since then have been: Goya Toledo, Lydia Bosch, Blanca Suárez and Maribel Verdú.

== Awards ==
- Medal from the Russian Academy of Arts, 2000

== See also ==
- Art jewelry

== Bibliography ==
- Joan Lluis Montané, 2004. Manuel Carrera, 50 años de creaciones y momentos inolvidables (Manuel Carrera, 50 years of creation and unforgettable moments), Publicaciones Joyeras, S.A.
