= Rosario Nadal =

Spanish art dealer and Bulgarian princess

Princess Rosario
- Princess of Preslav; Duchess in Saxony
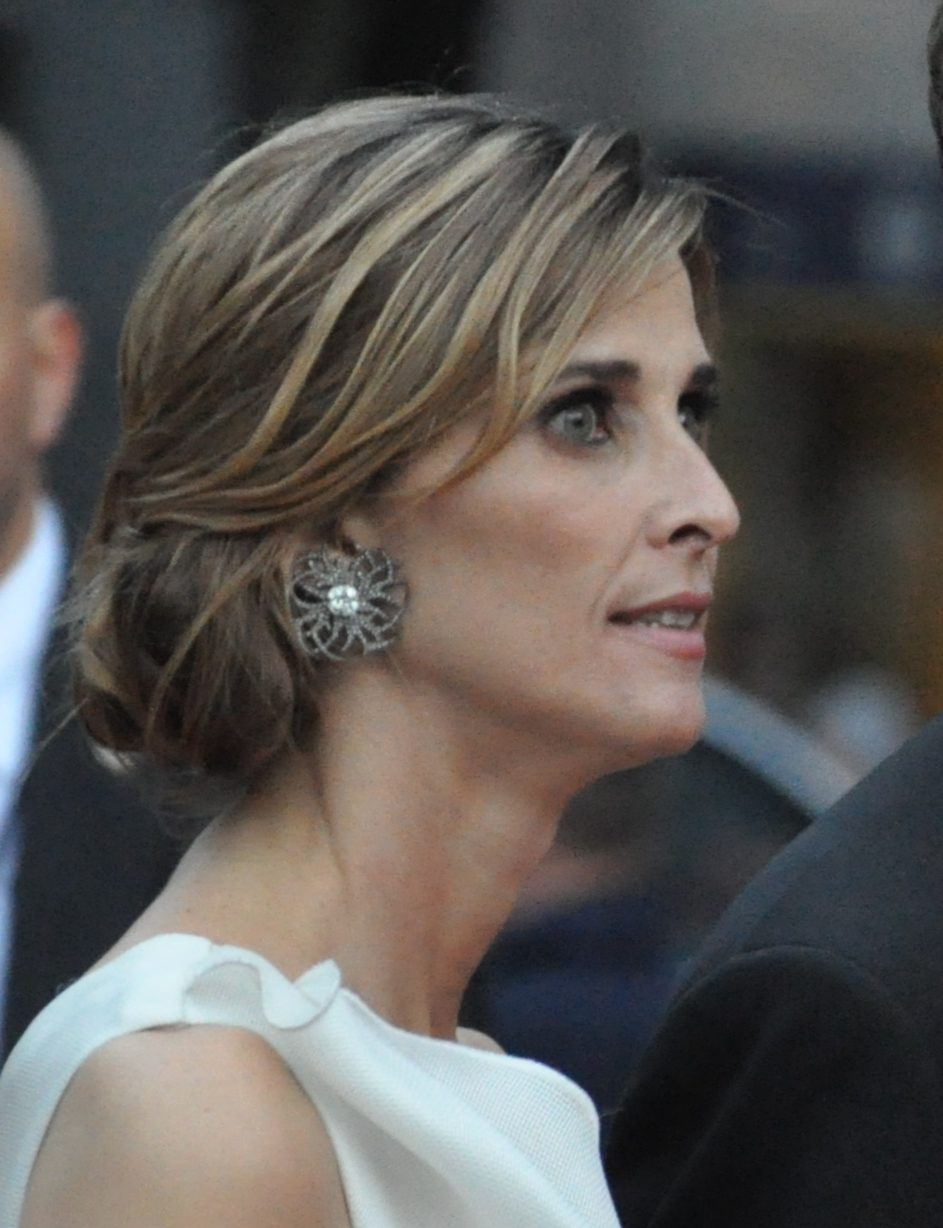
- Pictured at the wedding of Crown Princess Victoria of Sweden in 2010
- Born: María del Rosario Nadal y Fuster de Puigdórfila; October 22, 1968 (age 58); Palma de Mallorca, Mallorca; Balearic Islands, Spain
- Spouse: Kyril, Prince of Preslav (m. 1989; sep. 2009)
- Issue: Princess Mafalda-Cecilia; Princess Olimpia; Prince Tassilo
- Father: Miguel Nadal y Bestard
- Mother: Isabel Fuster de Puigdórfila y Villanova
- Occupation: art director, art consultant

María del Rosario Nadal y Fuster de Puigdórfila (born 22 October 1968), also known as the Princess of Preslav, is a Spanish consultant, art director, and former model. A former muse for Valentino, she works as an independent adviser to private art collectors and serves as the deputy director of the Colección Jumex. She is a senior member of the Bulgarian royal family as the estranged wife of Kyril, Prince of Preslav, from whom she separated in 2009.

== Early life ==
Rosario was born Doña María del Rosario Nadal y Fuster de Puigdórfila on 22 October 1968 in Palma de Mallorca to Doña Isabel Fuster de Puigdórfila y Villanova and Miguel Nadal y Bestard. A member of the Spanish nobility by birth, she is the granddaughter of Joaquín de Puigdórfila y Zaforteza, 9th Count of Olocau. Her family is descended from the Aztec emperor Moctezuma II through his daughter Isabel Moctezuma.

She was educated at the Colegio Madre Alberta. She went on to study fine art at Richmond, The American International University in London.

== Career ==
In 1989 Rosario worked at Christie's and in London and Italian art galleries. She later began working as a contemporary art consultant and independent adviser to private art collectors and established her own company, RSC Contemporary.

In the 1990s Rosario served as a muse to the Italian designer Valentino Garavani and modeled in one of his advertisement campaigns. She has been featured on the cover of Vanity Fair España, Vogue Spain and Vogue Italia.

In the early 2000s she became the personal art adviser for Mexican businessman Eugenio López Alonso. In 2013 Rosario and Vicente Todolí launched the Jumex Museum in Mexico City as part of the Colección Jumex, for which she serves as the deputy director. In her role at Jumex, she has procured works by Antoni Muntadas, Xabier Salaberría, Txomin Badiola, and Santiago Sierra and has worked in partnerships with the Barcelona Museum of Contemporary Art and Museo Nacional Centro de Arte Reina Sofía.

Rosario also owns and manages Arar Producciones Rurales SL, a Spanish company that cultivates legumes.

== Personal life ==
Rosario married Kyril, Prince of Preslav, the son of Tsar Simeon II of Bulgaria and Doña Margarita Gómez-Acebo y Cejuela, on 15 September 1989 in an Eastern Orthodox ceremony at St. Anne's Chapel in the Almudaina Palace in Palma de Mallorca. The wedding was attended by senior members of the Spanish royal family including Juan Carlos I of Spain, Queen Sofía of Spain, Felipe, Prince of Asturias, Infanta Cristina of Spain, and Infanta Elena, Duchess of Lugo. She has three children: Princess Mafalda-Cecilia, Princess Olimpia, and Prince Tassilo.

In September 2009 she and her husband were included in the Best Dressed List by Vanity Fair España. Rosario was added to the list again in 2013. She was added to the International Best Dressed Hall of Fame List in 1995.

Rosario and Prince Kyril separated in October 2009. She has since been in a relationship with Albanian artist Anri Sala. She resides in London. While she and Prince Kyril are separated, they are not divorced, and she has made official appearances with him since the separation. In 2010 she accompanied her estranged husband to the wedding of Victoria, Crown Princess of Sweden and Daniel Westling and in 2026 to the funeral of Harald V.

Rosario is a godmother of Prince Sverre Magnus of Norway. She is a close friend of Infanta Cristina of Spain and is also the godmother of her daughter, Irene Urdangarin y de Borbón. In 2015 she spoke out in support of Infanta Cristina and her husband, Iñaki Urdangarin, after they were investigated for fraud and corruption.
