= Ivan Shishman II =

Bulgarian rebel (1598)

Ivan Shishman II (Bulgarian: Иван Шишман), also known as (Ivan) Shishman III, (Note: If Shishman of Vidin (who did not rule as tsar) is counted as "Shishman I".) was a Bulgarian rebel proclaimed as tsar of Bulgaria in Tarnovo during the First Tarnovo Uprising (1598). He and the rebels briefly held control of Tarnovo, which had been the capital of the Second Bulgarian Empire (1185–1395), until the uprising was crushed by the Ottoman Empire.

Ivan Shishman II claimed descent from the Second Bulgarian Empire's last ruling dynasty, the House of Sratsimir, allegedly from the tsar Ivan Shishman (r. 1371–1395). Although unverified, it is possible that he was a genuine descendant given that the family is recorded to have survived in the neighbouring Kingdom of Hungary until at least the second half of the 16th century. It has also been suggested that "Ivan Shishman" was a name assumed by one of the other known leaders of the uprising, Theodore Balina, as self-proclaimed tsar.
