= Rostislav Stratimirovich =

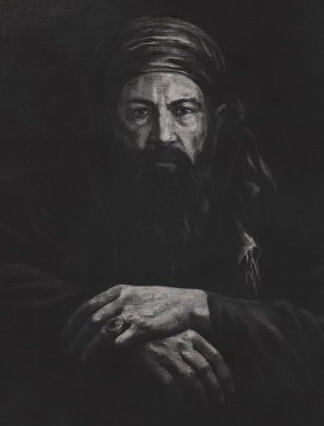
- Born: Tarnovo, Ottoman Empire (modern day Bulgaria)
- Died: Tolochanovo, Russia
- Title: Prince of Tarnovo
- Spouse: Maria Dobrovska
- Relatives: Ivan Stratsimir (claimed ancestor)

Rostislav Stratimirovich (Bulgarian: Ростислав Стратимирович; Russian: Ростислав Страшимирович; fl. 1683–88) was a Bulgarian rebel leader who led the Second Tarnovo Uprising against the Ottoman Empire in 1686. He claimed the title Prince of Tarnovo, as a claimed descendant of the medieval Bulgarian ruler Ivan Stratsimir.

== Life ==
Rostislav claimed descent from Ivan Stratsimir, the last Emperor of Vidin (r. 1356–96). He belonged to the Ottoman Bulgarian sipahi.

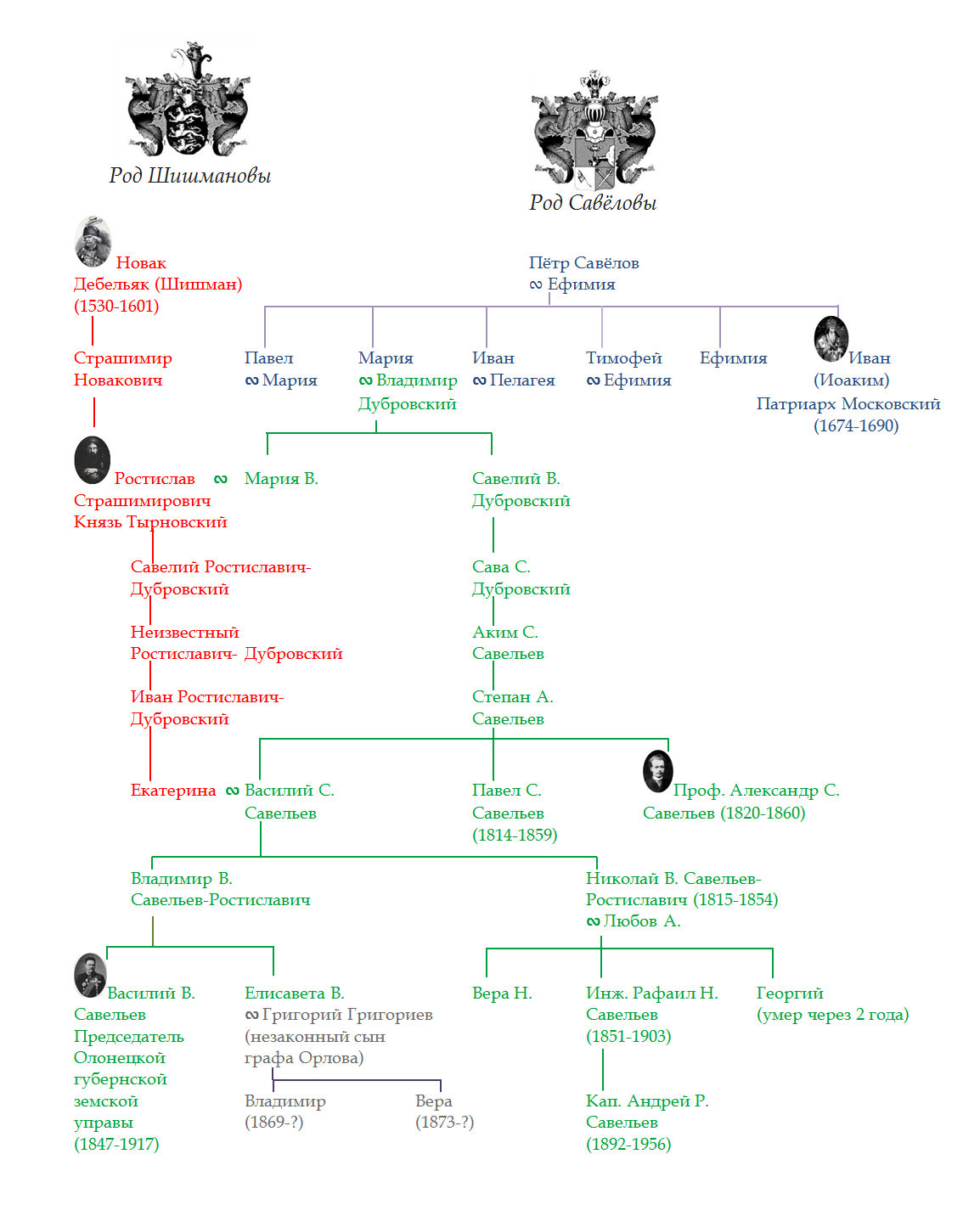
A family tree of the Russian family Saveliev-Rostislavic, according to the version of Nikolay Elagin.

He was the head of the conspirators of an uprising in Ottoman Bulgaria, at Tarnovo. In 1686 he left for Russia, intending to gain support in the rebellion. At Moscow he met Russian Orthodox Patriarch Joachim and asked him for help. The agreement was being guaranteed by the engagement between Rostislav and the niece of the patriarch, Maria Dubrovska. Upon the start of the Russo-Turkish War (1686–1700), the rebellion broke out prematurely in the old Bulgarian capital of Tarnovo. Rostislav returned to Ottoman Bulgaria, but the Ottoman forces were much greater and the rebellion was suppressed. Heavily wounded, Rostislav got to the Rila Monastery, where the monks saved his life. After many adventures he went back to Moscow, where he finally married Maria Dubrovska and gave the foundations of the Russian noble family Saveliev–Rostislavich.

One of his descendants is the Russian writer Nikolay Saveliev–Rostislavic.
