= Almudena Fernández =

Spanish model (born 1977)

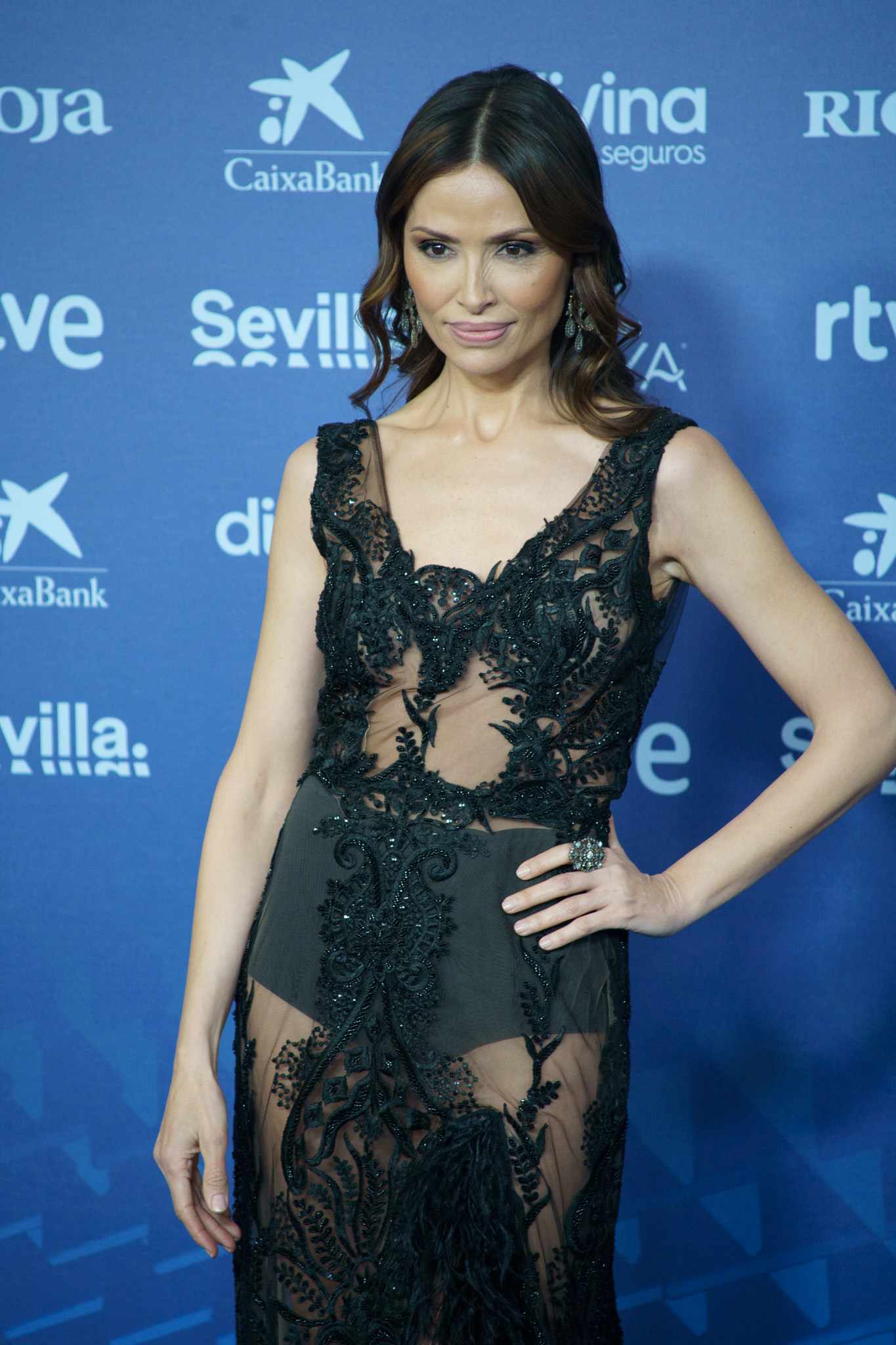
- Almudena Fernández in 2023
- Born: 1 January 1974 (age 52); Benavente, Zamora, Spain
- Height: 1.74 m (5 ft 8 1/2 in)
- Website: almudenafernanfez.info

Almudena Fernández (born 1 January 1977) is a Spanish model.

== Early life ==
She was born on 1 January 1974 in Benavente, Zamora, Spain. She was raised in Madrid and participated in the Supermodel of the World contest during her studies at the high school. In the competition she won the second place.

== Modeling ==
Fernández has been the cover girl for fashion magazines such as Elle, Marie Claire, Vogue, Cosmopolitan, Madame Figaro, Shape, Biba, Joyce and Harper's Bazaar among others. She has been photographed by Michael Thompson, Ruben Afanador, Raphael Mazzucco, Walter Chin, David Bailey, Mark Baptist, Diego Uchitel, Norman Jean Roy for campaigns for Hermès, Givenchy, Cartier, Wolford, Revlon, Lacoste, Carolina Herrera, Lancel, Gianfranco Ferré, L'Oréal, Carrera y Carrera, Victoria's Secret, and Kookai. She also adorned the Hello!/Carrera y Carrera photo session with matador Eugenio de Mora, based upon the novel Blood and Sand by Vicente Blasco Ibáñez.

Cosmopolitan TV awarded Fernández as the best international model of 2007.

== Acting career ==
Ever since Fernández arrived in New York, she has combined her work as a model with acting classes at the school The New Actors Workshop directed by George Morrison and the Academy Award winner Mike Nichols.

Fernández took acting classes at Cristina Rota's school of actors in Madrid which led her to star at Willie Nelson's "Maria" video clip aside Luke Wilson.

== See also ==
- Ines Sastre
- Ana Alvarez
