= Bulgarian royal family =

Rulers of Bulgaria from 1887 to 1946

House of Saxe-Coburg and Gotha-Koháry (Bulgarian royal line) House of Saxe-Coburg-Bulgaria House of Bulgaria House of Sakskoburggotski
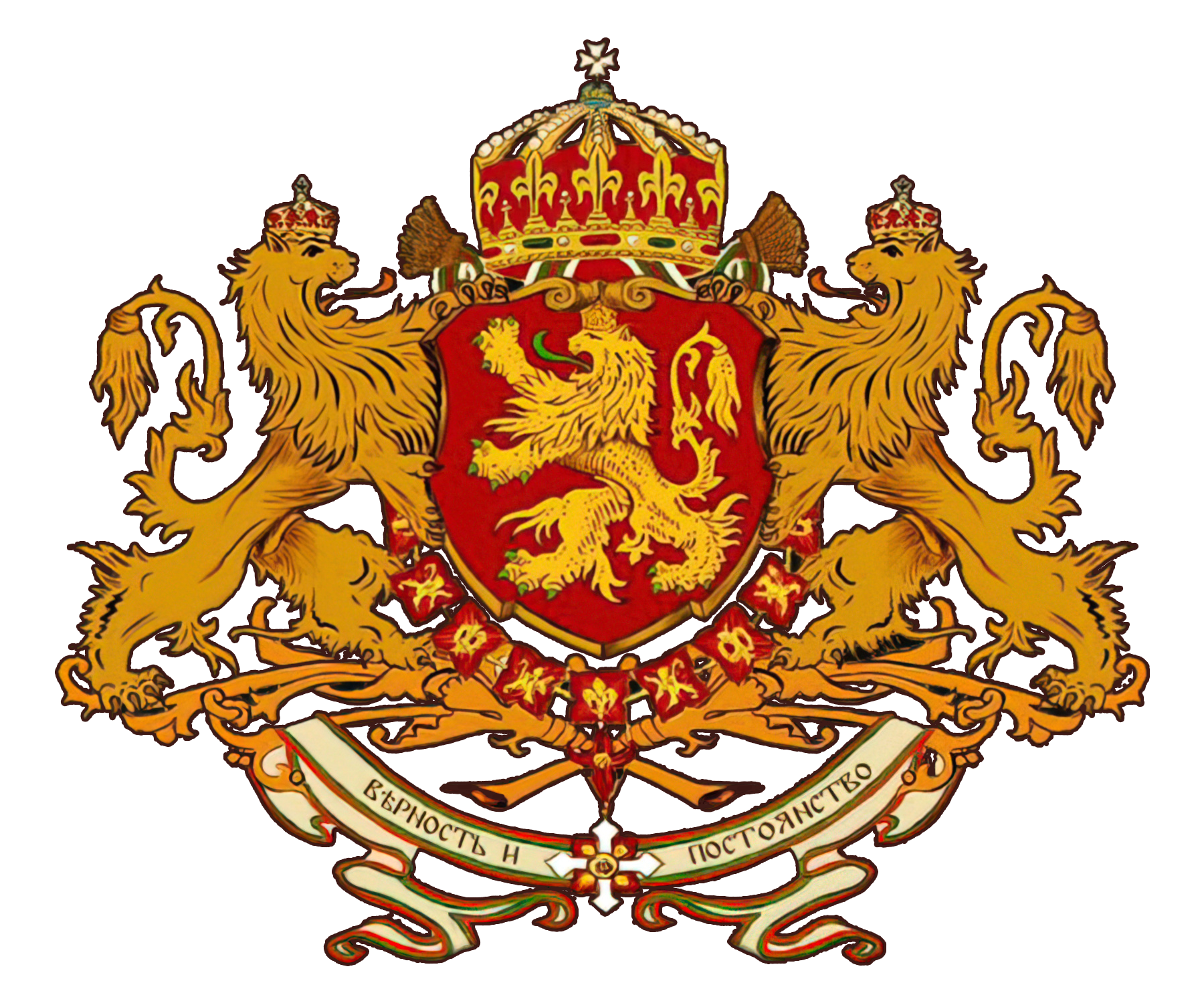
- Parent house: Saxe-Coburg-Gotha-Koháry
- Country: Bulgaria
- Founded: 1887; 139 years ago
- Founder: Ferdinand I
- Current head: Simeon II
- Final ruler: Simeon II
- Titles: Prince (Княз), Tsar (Цар), Prime Minister of Bulgaria
- Estate: Vrana Palace
- Deposition: 1946; 80 years ago

The last Bulgarian royal family (Bulgarian: Българско царско семейство, romanized: Balgarsko tsarsko semeystvo) is a line of the Koháry branch of the House of Saxe-Coburg and Gotha, which ruled Bulgaria from 1887 to 1946. The last tsar, Simeon II, became Prime Minister of Bulgaria in 2001 and remained in office until 2005. Members of the royal family claim the titles of Prince (Princess) of Bulgaria and Duke (Duchess) in Saxony, with the style of Royal Highness.

Coburg Peak on Trinity Peninsula in Antarctica is named after the Bulgarian royal house of Saxe-Coburg and Gotha.

== Current family tree ==
This is the family tree of the Bulgarian royal family, including all descendants of Tsar Ferdinand I.

- Tsar Ferdinand I (1861–1948)
  - Tsar Boris III (1894–1943)
    - Tsar Simeon II (born 1937)
      - Kardam, Prince of Tarnovo (1962–2015)
        - Boris, Prince of Tarnovo (born 1997)
        - Prince Beltrán (born 1999)
      - Kyril, Prince of Preslav (born 1964)
        - Princess Mafalda-Cecilia (born 1994)
        - Princess Olimpia (born 1995)
        - Prince Tassilo (born 2002)
      - Kubrat, Prince of Panagyurishte (born 1965)
        - Prince Mirko (born 1995)
        - Prince Lukás (born 1997)
        - Prince Tirso (born 2002)
      - Konstantin-Assen, Prince of Vidin (born 1967)
        - Prince Umberto (born 1999)
        - Princess Sofia (born 1999)
      - Princess Kalina, Mrs. Muñoz (born 1972)
        - Simeon Hassan Muñoz (born 2007)
    - Marie-Louise, Princess of Koháry (born 1933)
      - Prince Boris of Leiningen (born 1960)
        - Prince Nicholas of Leiningen (born 1991)
        - Prince Karl Heinrich of Leiningen (born 2001)
        - Princess Juliana of Leiningen (born 2003)
      - Prince Hermann Friedrich of Leiningen (born 1963)
        - Princess Tatiana of Leiningen, Mrs. Reynolds (born 1989)
          - August Reynolds (born 2021)
          - Celeste Reynolds (born 2023)
        - Princess Nadia of Leiningen, Mrs. Baker (born 1991)
          - Thomas Baker Leiningen (born 2021)
          - Theodore Baker Leiningen (born 2024)
          - Georgia Baker Leiningen (born 2026)
        - Princess Alexandra of Leiningen (born 1997)
      - Princess Alexandra Chrobok of Koháry, Mrs. Raposo de Magalhães (born 1970)
        - Prince Luis de Magalhães von Koháry (born 2003)
        - Princess Giovanna de Magalhães von Koháry (born 2006)
        - Princess Clémentine de Magalhães von Koháry (born 2010)
      - Prince Pawel Chrobok of Koháry (born 1972)
        - Princess Maya Chrobok of Koháry (born 2015)
        - Prince Alexander Chrobok of Koháry (born 2017)
  - Kiril, Prince of Preslav (1895–1945)
  - Princess Eudoxia (1898–1985)
  - Princess Nadezhda, Duchess Albrecht Eugen of Württemberg (1899–1958)
    - Duke Ferdinand Eugen of Württemberg (1925–2020)
    - Duchess Margareta Luise of Württemberg, Viscountess of Chevigny (1928–2017)
      - Patrick de La Lanne-Mirrlees (born 1962)
        - Marie Charlotte Rusche (née de La Lanne-Mirrlees, born 1989)
        - Berenice de La Lanne-Mirrlees (born 1990)
        - Cyran de La Lanne-Mirrlees (born 1997)
    - Duke Eugen Eberhard of Wurttemberg (1930–2022)
    - Duke Alexander Eugen of Wurttemberg (1933-2024)
    - Duchess Sophie of Wurttemberg (born 1937)

== Other members ==
The Tsar's in-laws include:

=== Living members ===
- Tsaritsa Margarita (the Tsar's wife)
- Miriam, Dowager Princess of Tarnovo (the Tsar daughter-in-law, widow of Kardam, Prince of Tarnovo)
- Rosario, Princess of Preslav (the Tsar's daughter-in-law, wife of the Prince of Preslav)
- Marc Abousleiman (the Tsar's grandson-in-law, husband of Princess Mafalda-Cecilia)
- Carla, Princess of Panagyurishte (the Tsar's daughter-in-law, wife of the Prince of Panagyurishte)
- María, Princess of Vidin (the Tsar's daughter-in-law, wife of the Prince of Vidin)
- Antonio Muñoz (the Tsar's son-in-law, husband of Princess Kalina)
- Princess Cheryl of Leiningen (the Tsar's niece-in-law, wife of Prince Boris)
- Princess Deborah of Leiningen (the Tsar's niece-in-law, wife of Prince Hermann Friedrich)
- Clayton Reynolds (the Tsar's grandnephew-in-law, husband of Princess Tatiana)
- Ian Baker (the Tsar's grandnephew-in-law, husband of Princess Nadia)
- Jorge Champalimaud Raposo de Magalhães (the Tsar's nephew-in-law, husband of Princess Alexandra)
- Princess Ariana Chrobok of Koháry (the Tsar's niece-in-law, wife of Prince Pawel)
- Irene de La Lanne-Mirrlees (the Tsar's cousin-in-law, wife of Patrick de La Lanne-Mirrlees)
- Heinrich Rusche (the Tsar's cousin-in-law, husband of Marie Charlotte de La Lanne-Mirrlees)

=== Deceased members ===
- Princess Marie Louise (the Tsar's grandmother, first wife of then-Prince Ferdinand I, died in 1899)
- Princess Clémentine (the Tsar's great-grandmother, mother of tsar Ferdinand I, died in 1907)
- Tsaritsa Eleonore (the Tsar's step-grandmother, second wife of tsar Ferdinand I, died in 1917)
- Tsar Boris III (the Tsar's father, died in 1943)
- Kiril, Prince of Preslav (the Tsar's uncle, died in 1945)
- Tsar Ferdinand I (the Tsar's grandfather, died in 1948)
- Duke Albrecht Eugen of Württemberg (the Tsar's uncle-in-law, husband of Princess Nadezhda, died in 1954)
- Princess Nadezhda, Duchess Albrecht Eugen of Württemberg (the Tsar's aunt, died in 1958)
- Princess Eudoxia (the Tsar's aunt, died in 1985)
- Antonio de Ramos Bandeira (the Tsar's cousin-in-law, former husband of Duchess Sophie of Württemberg, daughter of Princess Nadezhda, died in 1987)
- Prince Karl of Leiningen (the Tsar's brother-in-law, former husband of Princess Marie Louise, died in 1990)
- Tsaritsa Giovanna (the Tsar's mother, widow of tsar Boris III, died in 2000)
- Princess Milena of Leiningen (the Tsar's niece-in-law, former wife of Prince Boris, son of Marie Louise, Princess of Koháry, died in 2015)
- Princess Alžbeta (the Tsar's step-grandmother, widow of tsar Ferdinand I, died in 2015)
- Duchess Margareta Luise of Württemberg, Viscountess of Chevigny (the Tsar's cousin, daughter of Princess Nadezhda, died in 2017)
- Duke Ferdinand Eugen of Württemberg (the Tsar's cousin, son of Princess Nadezhda, died in 2020)
- François Luce-Bailly, Viscount of Chevigny (the Tsar's cousin-in-law, widower of Duchess Margareta Luise of Württemberg, daughter of Princess Nadezhda, died in 2022)
- Duke Eugen Eberhard of Wurttemberg (the Tsar's cousin, son of Princess Nadezhda, died in 2022)
- Duke Alexander Eugen of Wurttemberg (the Tsar's cousin, son of Princess Nadezhda, died in 2024)
- Bronisław Chrobok (the Tsar's brother-in-law, husband of the Princess of Koháry, died in 2025)

=== Former members ===
- Archduchess Alexandra of Austria, Duchess of Württemberg (the Tsar's cousin-in-law, former wife of Duke Eugen Eberhard, son of Princess Nadezhda)

== Tsardom of Bulgaria ==
The ruling members were:

- Ferdinand I (1887–1918)
- Boris III (1918–1943)
- Simeon II (1943–1946)

== See also ==
- List of Bulgarian monarchs
