= Ona Mafalda =

Spanish singer

Princess Mafalda
- Born: Mafalda-Cecilia von Saxe-Coburg und Gotha; 27 July 1994 (age 32); London, England
- Spouse: Marc Abousleiman (m. 2022; div. 2024)
- House: Saxe-Coburg and Gotha-Koháry
- Father: Kyril, Prince of Preslav
- Mother: Rosario Nadal
- Occupation: Singer
- Official website

Mafalda-Cecilia von Saxe-Coburg und Gotha (Bulgarian: Mafalda-Cecilia Sakskoburggotska; born 27 July 1994), known professionally as Ona Mafalda, is a Spanish singer. She released her debut EP Bailando sin sentido in 2021, followed by her debut album, Ona, in 2023. She has performed at music festivals including Primavera Sound, Eurosonic Noorderslag, and The Great Escape Festival.

As a granddaughter of Simeon II, the last reigning tsar of Bulgaria, she is a member of the former Bulgarian royal family and a princess of the House of Saxe-Coburg and Gotha-Koháry.

== Early life and family ==
Mafalda was born on 27 July 1994 in London to María del Rosario Nadal y Fuster de Puigdórfila, a Spanish aristocrat and art director, and Kyril, Prince of Preslav, a member of the Bulgarian royal family. She is a granddaughter of Simeon II of Bulgaria, who was the last tsar of the Kingdom of Bulgaria and later served as the prime minister of the Republic of Bulgaria. In 1999 Mafalda served as a bridal attendant in the wedding of Princess Alexia of Greece and Denmark and Carlos Morales Quintana.

Mafalda grew up in London and in Mallorca. She moved to the United States to attend Berklee College of Music in Boston, where she was a student for three years.

== Career ==
Mafalda describes her music as "dark pop" and cites Lana Del Rey, Cat Power, Lauryn Hill, The Strokes, Belle & Sebastian, and Kaiser Chiefs as musical influences. She started writing music when she was fourteen years old. She released her first single, Don't Let Go, in 2015 while she was a student at Berklee. She released an extended play titled Daisy Chain in June 2019, which was produced by Ian Barter and Doug Schadt.

In 2016, she performed for a Valentino fashion show at Island Club on the Athens Riviera in Greece. Mafalda performed at New York Fashion Week and went on a music tour in Italy in 2019.

Mafalda released her debut extended play, Bailando sin sentido, in April 2021. She collaborated with French pianist Sofiane Pamart on the songs A otro lado, Mala suerte, and Mi parte.

On 8 June 2022, she performed at Primavera Sound 2022. She also performed at Inverfest and the Festival de La Luz.

Her debut album, Ona, released in 2023. It was produced by ODDLIQUOR. In May 2023, Mafalda performed as an opening act in Barcelona for Coldplay on the second European run of their Music of the Spheres World Tour.

On 19 January 2024, she performed at Eurosonic Noorderslag in Groningen. She performed at The Great Escape Festival in Brighton in May 2024.

== Personal life ==
Mafalda moved to New York City in 2017 and lives in Lower Manhattan.

In 2016 she was featured in a society list of New Modern Swans by Town & Country.

On 28 May 2022 she married Marc Abousleiman, son of Lebanese Minister of Labour Camille Abousleiman, in Palma, Mallorca. They separated in 2024.

== Discography ==
=== Extended plays ===
- Daisy Chain (2019)
- Bailando sin sentido (2021)

=== Albums ===
- Ona (2023)
- Reset (2025)
