= Anton Hykisch =

Slovak writer and politician (1932–2024)

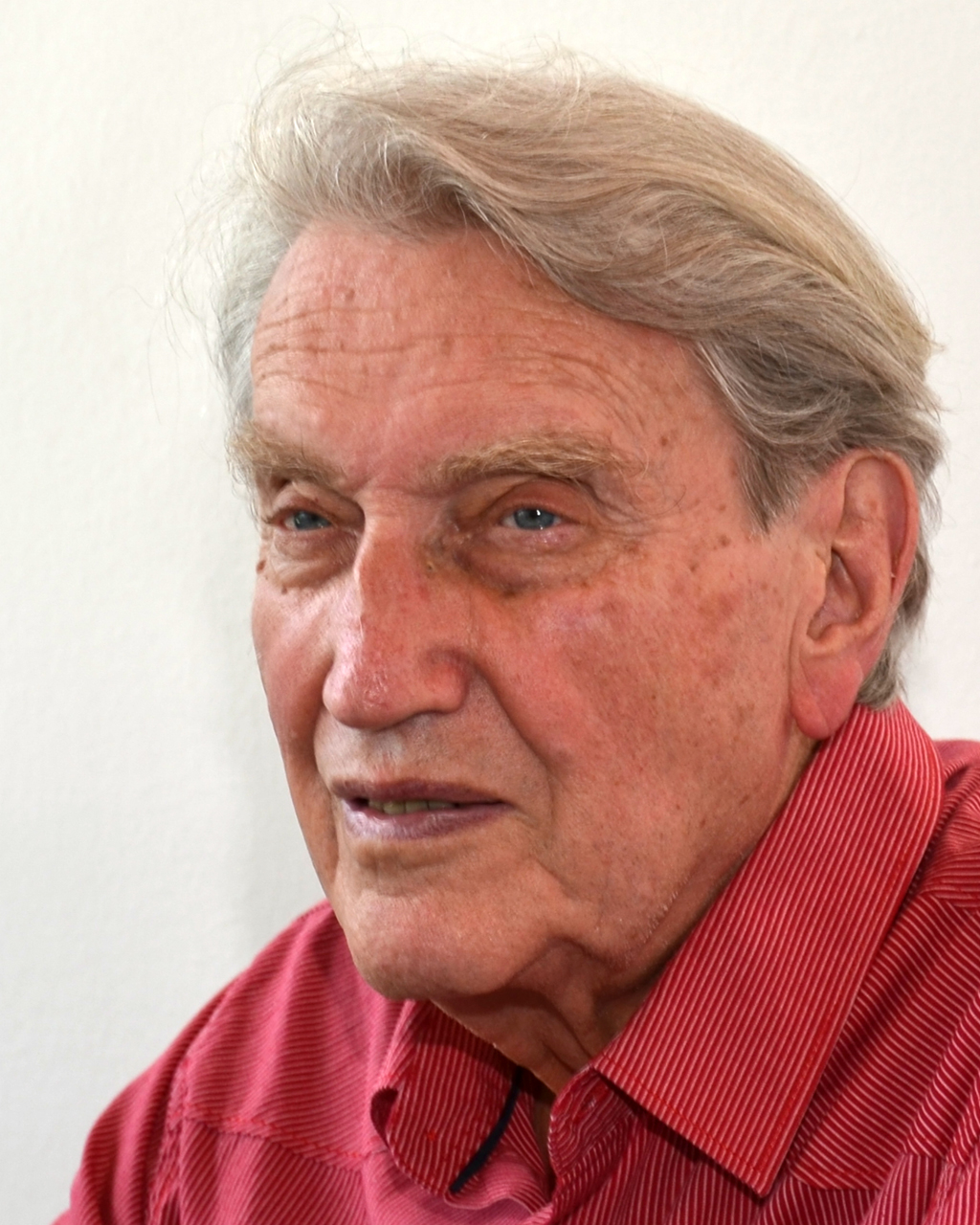
- Hykish in 2017
- Born: 23 February 1932; Banská Štiavnica, Czechoslovakia
- Died: 17 July 2024 (aged 92); Bratislava, Slovakia
- Occupation(s): Poet, writer, politician

Anton Hykisch (23 February 1932 – 17 July 2024) was a Slovak writer, politician and diplomat. Hykisch was a member of the Slovak National Assembly (Slovak Parliament) from 1990 to 1992 and the first Slovak ambassador to Canada from 1993 to 1997.

== Biography ==
Hykisch was born in a family of a clerk and received his education in Banská Štiavnica, Pukanka, Levice and finally in Bratislava, where he studied from 1951 to 1956 at the University of Economics. In 1956–1958 he worked in a research institute, in 1958 at the Railway Construction, in 1958–1962 at the Horticultural and Recreational Services of the City of Bratislava. From 1962 to 1969 he worked as a literary editor at the Czechoslovak Radio, from 1969 to 1974 at the Central Library of the Slovak Academy of Sciences, and from 1974 he worked at Diel. From 1987 he was editor and later director of the Mladé letá publishing house, from 1990 to 1992, he was a Member of Parliament and from 1993 to 1997 he was Ambassador to Canada. He died on 17 July 2024, at the age of 92.

== Works ==
=== For adults ===
- 1961 – Dream Enters the Station, short story
- 1963 – A Step into the Unknown, debut novel (written and published in 1959, scrapped immediately after publication)
- 1963 – I Met You, short story
- 1964 – Naďa, novella
- 1965 – Námestie v Mähring, novel
- 1971 – And you won't find peace anywhere, or Murder in the Spa, detective story (published only in Czech)
- 1977 – The Time of the Masters, a two-part historical novel
- 1978 – Relationships, short story
- 1979 – The Good Secret Brain, a collection of science fiction short stories and news
- 1980 – Desire, short story
- 1984 – Love the Queen, historical novel
- 1988 – Atomic Summer, novel – fictionalization of current events
- 1990 – Defense of Secrets, a collection of fantasy prose
- 1999 – Maria Theresa
- 2006 – The Thirteenth Hour. Time of the Masters (reissue)
- 2006 – Alone in Strange Cities
- 2007 – Remember the Tsar
- 2009 – The Delights of Old Times. A novel about the 20th century with autobiographical elements
- 2016 – Believe the Emperor, a historical novel from the reign of Joseph II.

=== For children ===
- 1987 – The Future is Today, a non-fiction book
- 1989 – Friend Čipko, author's fairy tale connected with popular science literature

=== Essays ===
- 2001 – Let's not be afraid of the world
- 2003 – What I Think About It

=== Nonfiction ===
- 1968 – Canada is not "Canada", a travel book of reports
- 1975 – Steering wheels to the skies, a factual book about car racing and famous racers
- 1990 – Vacation in Beijing, travelogue
- 2004 – What politics tastes like. Memories and Records from 1990-1992

=== Other ===
- 1965 – He doesn't play the blues for me, screenplay for the film, based on the novel A Step into the Unknown
- 1966 – Praskanie, radio play
- 1969 – Conception, radio play
- 1988 – Such Strange Conversations, radio work
