= Vrana Palace =

- Дворец Врана
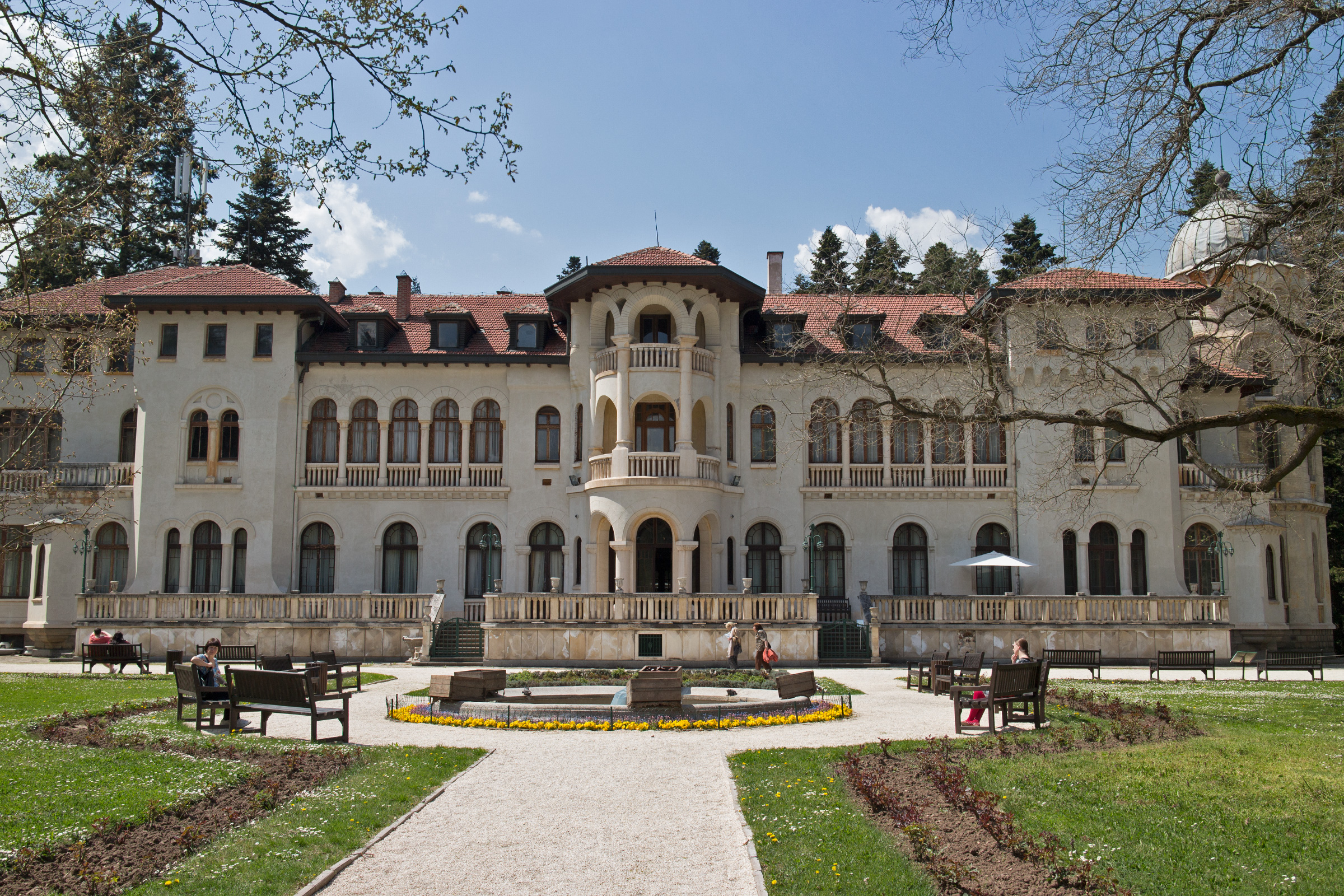
- Former name: Vranya
- Established: 1912
- Location: Sofia, Bulgaria
- Coordinates: 42°38′25″N 23°25′58″E
- Type: History museum
- Owner: Simeon Saxe-Coburg-Gotha
- Public transit access: Bus X50 to the terminus bus stop "Vrana Palace"
- Parking: Parking lots in front of the official entrance
- Website: Palace Website: dvoretz-vrana.bg Park Website: park-vrana.com

Vrana Palace (Bulgarian: Дворец "Врана", romanized: Dvorets "Vrana"; formerly Враня; Vranya) is a royal palace, on the outskirts of Sofia, the capital of Bulgaria. It is today the official residence of the former royal family of Bulgaria. While the Royal Palace in the centre of Sofia (today the National Art Gallery and National Ethnographic Museum) served representative purposes and the Euxinograd Palace near Varna was a summer residence, Vrana was the palace where the royal family of Bulgaria spent most of their time. Vrana Palace is situated at an elevation of 571 m.

It includes the site of Chardakli farm, where there was a bridge which featured in the liberation of Sofia.

== History ==
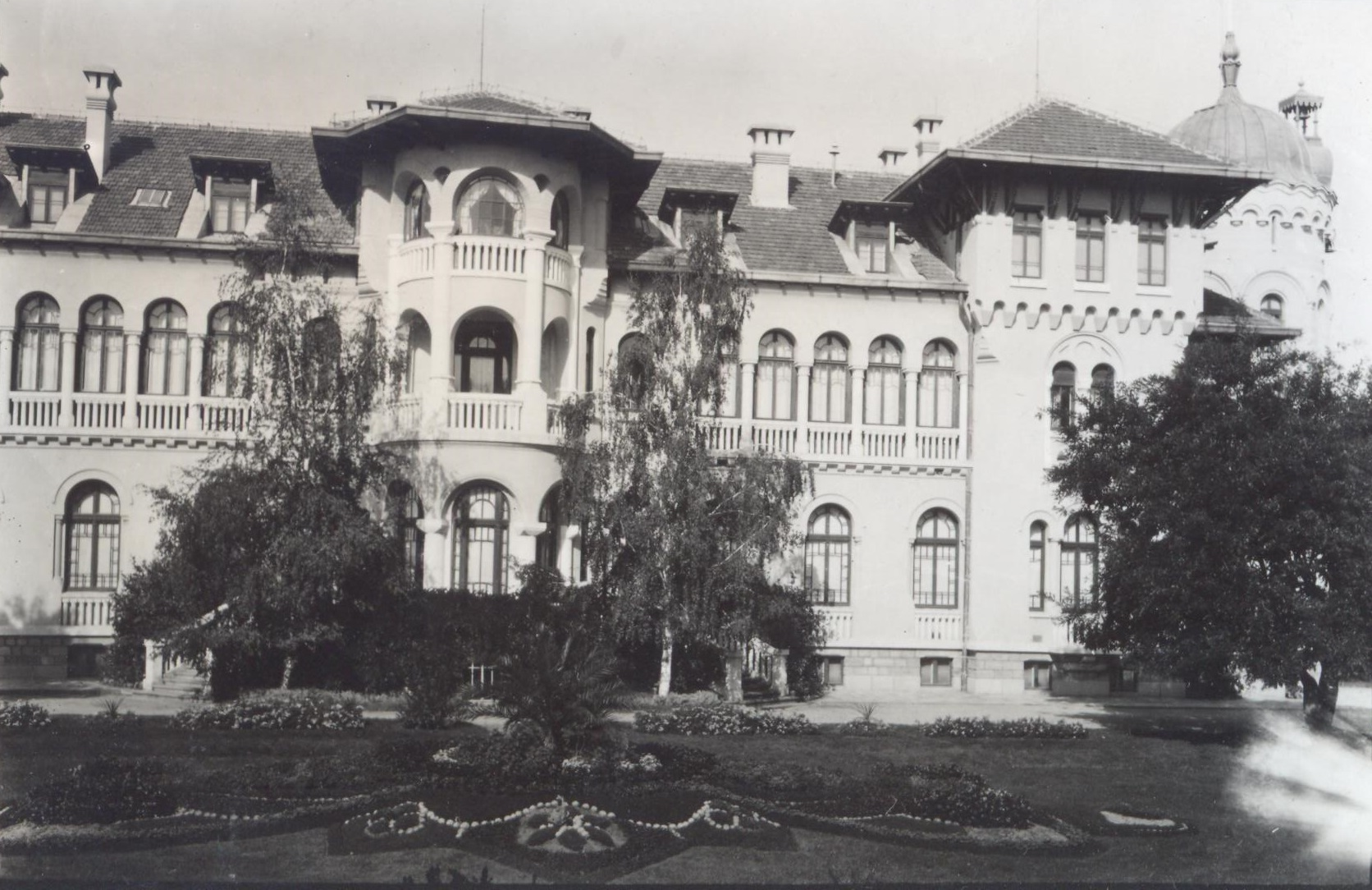
Vrana Palace before 1944 (image from the Bulgarian Archives State Agency)

The extensive lot was bought by Tsar Ferdinand I in 1898 and was situated just outside Sofia whereas nowadays is inside the city proper. There is a large park and two buildings, the first one built in 1904 as a two-story hunting lodge commissioned to Georgi Fingov, and the second constructed mainly between 1909 and 1914 as a palace. The earliest building in the complex, the hunting lodge, has been described architecturally as an "exquisite interpretation of the Plovdiv baroque with Viennese decorative elements".

Three rooms of the three-storey palace commissioned to the noted architect Nikola Lazarov were later furnished in the Baroque style, one in the style of the Austrian royal palaces and one in a Bulgarian national style, while the study was designed in a Venetian style. The palace features a carved wooden ceiling, oak wainscoting, built-in metal plates and Delftware. The interior columns are made of Carrara marble and an old Schindler lift is still in use. In terms of architecture, the Vrana Palace combines Byzantine influences, Bulgarian National Revival traditions, Art Nouveau and French classicism.

The Karelian Hall is a gift from Alexander III of Russia, and all of its furniture (the table, the chairs and the dressing table) are made of Karelian birch by master woodworkers specially sent from Russia. The first storey also has a cinema hall and tea halls, the second storey is where the apartments are located, and the third one used to be allocated to the servants and the court.

In 1918 Vrana passed from Tsar Ferdinand to Boris III. Here he faced the new government after the military coup on 9 June 1923. In August 1943, it became the property of Simeon II. The main palace was bombed by the RAF in 1943–1944 during World War II, and, after being partially damaged, it was subsequently restored in 1947. After the abolition of the monarchy, Vrana was taken by the communists and became a residence of Georgi Dimitrov.

After the fall of the communist regime, Vrana was returned to the last tsar, Simeon Saxe-Coburg-Gotha and his sister Princess Maria Luisa, by the Constitutional Court of Bulgaria in June 1998, and the park was donated by the royal family to the city of Sofia in October 1999, making it possible for the former royal park, arranged in 1903 by Ferdinand, to be opened to the public. Simeon moved with his wife Margarita into the renovated old hunting lodge in spring 2001. As of 2015, the 0.968-square-kilometre park is opened to the public. The park is home to over 400 plant species and has been declared a national monument of landscape architecture. Among the landscape artists who have worked on the Vrana Park include V. Georgiev, K. Baykushev, Jules Locheau, Johann Kellerer, Anton Kraus, Alaricus Delmard and Wilhelm Schacht. The park includes a lake and several rock gardens.

The palace, along with the other properties given back to Simeon II, has been the subject of much controversy in the Bulgarian media and society in the 2000s, as many argue they are in fact supposed to be public property. Since June 2013, the park has been opened to the public on weekends. The special public transport bus X50, which only runs on weekends during the park's opening hours, connects the palace with Eagles' Bridge.

== Burials ==
The Park:

- Boris III of Bulgaria (1946–1954)

The Palace Crypt:

- Kardam, Prince of Tarnovo (*2024) - (son of Simeon II of Bulgaria)
- Ferdinand I of Bulgaria (*2024)
