= Theodore Balina =

Ottoman Bulgarian nobleman

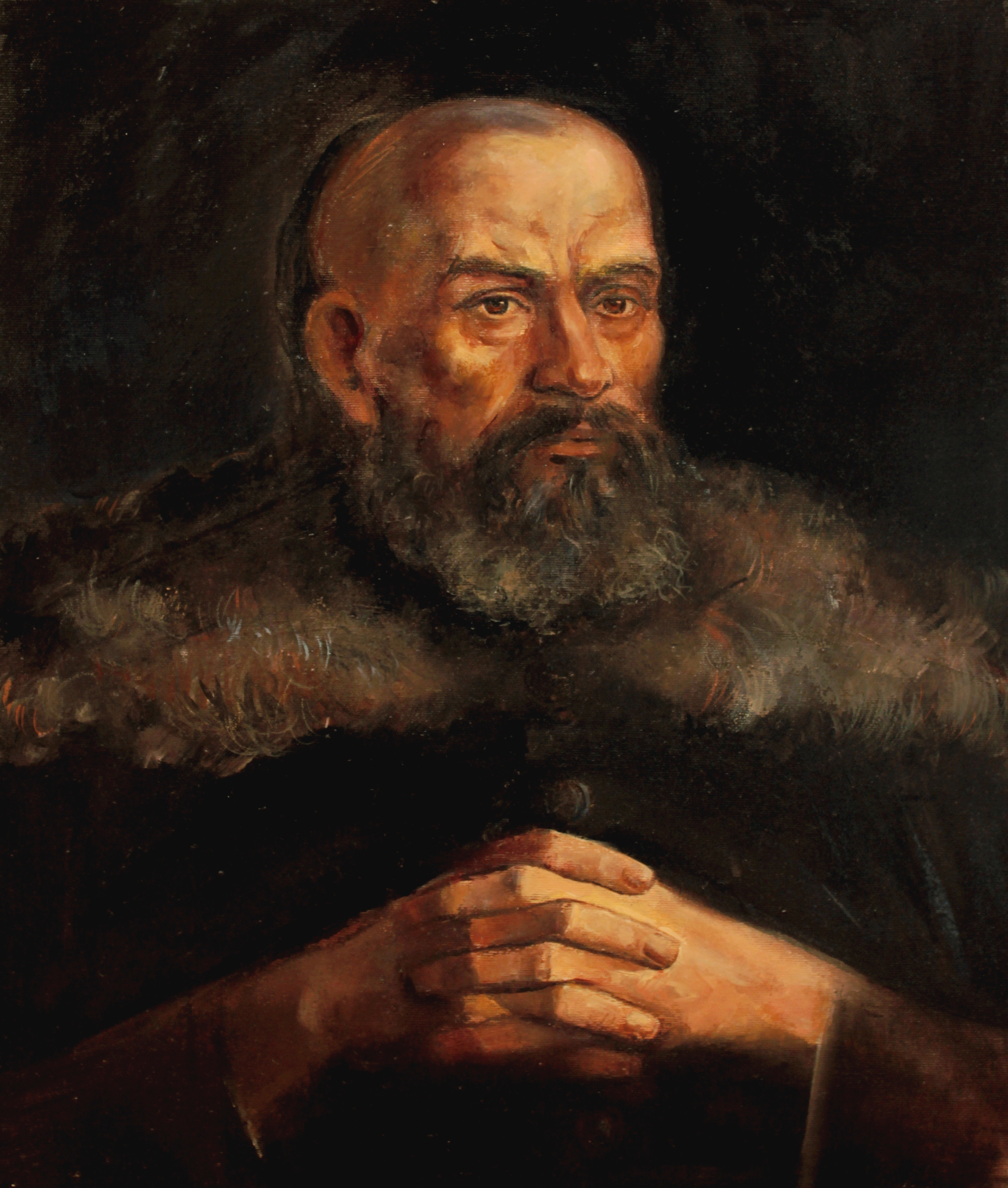
- Born: Nicopolis, Ottoman Empire (modern day Bulgaria)
- Died: Russia
- Noble family: (possibly) Shishman

Theodore Balina (Bulgarian: Теодор Балина/Teodor Balina) was an Ottoman Bulgarian nobleman and leader in the Sanjak of Nicopolis who led the First Tarnovo Uprising against the Ottoman Empire in 1598.

== Life ==
To him the local merchant from Ragusa Pavel Đorđević writes:

Lord Theodore Ballina is a first noble in Nicopolis sandzak, which enjoys great influence among Christians in this country because of its noble origin and dignity. Turks watch it in your mouth what you say, and pashas respect him very much and he consulted him on every important issue.

— Đorđević, Siebmacher "Dalmatien" Seite 21 f., Tfl. 14

Except Theodore, the uprising was organized by religious leaders, as well as public figures and merchants. These included the Archbishop of Tarnovo Dionysus Rali, Pavel Đorđić and the Sorkočević brothers, with the bishops Theophanes of Lovech, Jeremiah of Rousse, Spyridon of Shumen and Methodius of Thrace and other high-ranking religious figures also taking part in the organization.

The invasion of Wallachian forces under Michael the Brave in the northern Bulgarian lands in the autumn of 1598 provided good conditions for the uprising, as the fellow Christian army would support the insurrection according to the plan. At the time the Ottomans were engaged in the Long War with the Habsburg monarchy. One descendant (perhaps Theodore Balina) of the medieval Shishman dynasty was proclaimed Tsar of Bulgaria (as Ivan Shishman II) and Tarnovo was briefly liberated, with about 12,000 people gathering.

As a consequence, about 16,000 Bulgarians fled centrally-governed Ottoman territory and crossed the Danube to settle in autonomous neighbouring Wallachia, where they established a Bulgarian community. The leader of the Uprising emigrated to Russia.
