= First Tarnovo Uprising =

Bulgarian uprising against Ottoman rule in 1598

First Tarnovo uprising
- Part of Bulgarian–Ottoman wars
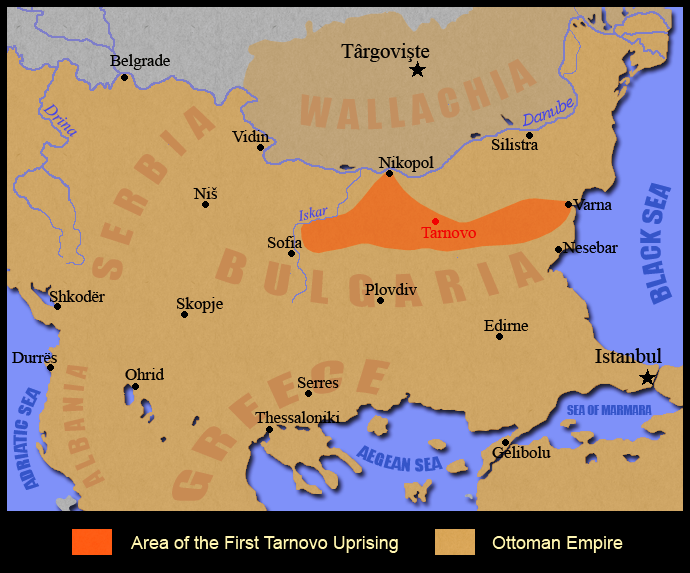
Date	1598
Location	Region of Bulgaria, Ottoman Empire
Result	Ottoman victory: Rebellion Suppressed

Belligerents
Bulgarian rebels	Ottoman Empire

Commanders and leaders
Theodore Balina; Ivan Shishman II; Dionysus Rallis; Pavel Đorđić; Sorkočević brothers	Unknown

Strength
Over 12,000	Unknown

Casualties and losses
Unknown	Unknown

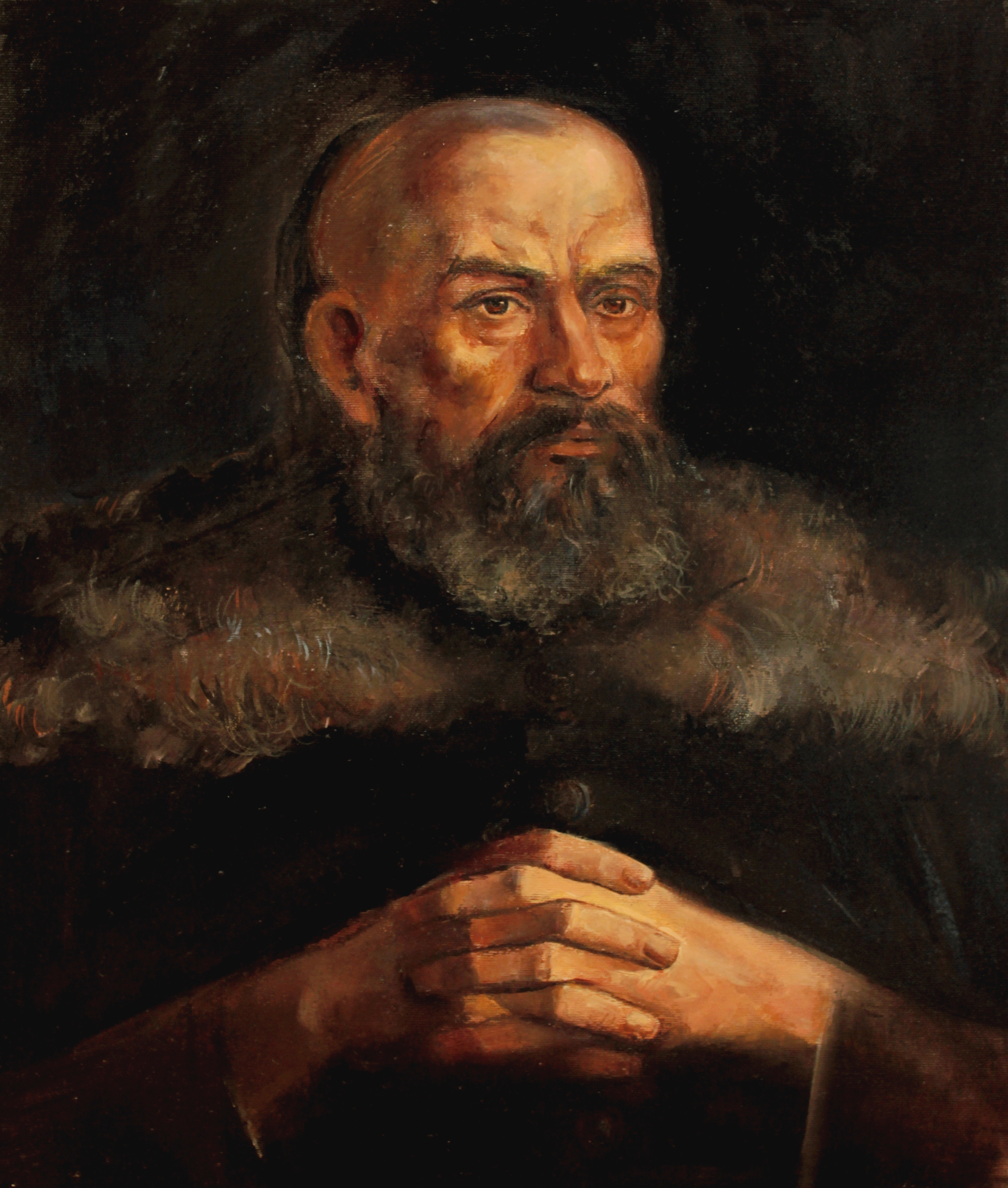
Theodore Ballina (19th century depiction)

The First Tarnovo uprising (Bulgarian: Първо търновско въстание, romanized: Parvo tarnovsko vastanie) was a Bulgarian uprising against Ottoman rule based in the former Bulgarian capital, Tarnovo, that broke out in 1598 and was severely crushed by the Ottoman authorities.

The uprising was organized by religious leaders, as well as public figures and merchants. These included the Archbishop of Tarnovo Dionysus Rallis, the noble Theodore Ballina from Nikopol, as well as the local merchants from Ragusa Pavel Đorđić and the Sorkočević brothers, with the bishops Theophanes of Lovech, Jeremiah of Rousse, Spyridon of Shumen, and Methodius of Thrace, and other high-ranking religious figures also taking part in the organization. Đorđić established relations with the Habsburgs, the Transylvanian and Wallachian rulers, and a plan for the uprising was created in Vienna in 1597.

The invasion of Wallachian forces under Michael the Brave in the northern Bulgarian lands in the autumn of 1598 provided good conditions for the uprising, as the fellow Christian army would support the insurrection according to the plan. At the time the Ottomans were engaged in the Long War with the Habsburg monarchy. An alleged descendant of the medieval Shishman dynasty was proclaimed Tsar of Bulgaria (as Ivan Shishman II) and Tarnovo was briefly liberated, with about 12,000 people gathering.

However, the Ottoman authorities reacted immediately and quickly recaptured the city using a regular army, brutally suppressing the uprising. It is unclear what the scale of the First Tarnovo Uprising was, but according to fragmentary information it may have included the regions of Ohrid, where the local archbishop was killed, as well as Sofia and Niš, where Austrian travellers mention seeing exposed dead bodies and severed human heads.

As a consequence, about 16,000 Bulgarians fled centrally-governed Ottoman territory and crossed the Danube to settle in autonomous neighbouring Wallachia, where they established a Bulgarian community.

== See also ==
- Second Tarnovo Uprising, 1686
