= Boris Saxe-Coburg-Gotha =

Prince of Tarnovo

Boris Борис
- Prince of Tarnovo
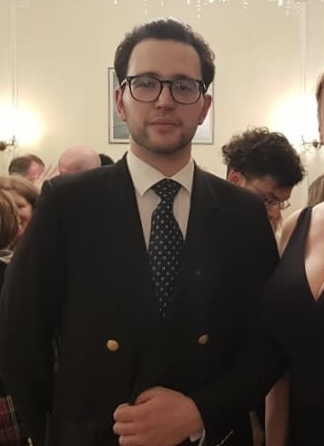
- Boris in 2019
- Born: 12 October 1997 (age 28); Madrid, Spain
- House: Saxe-Coburg and Gotha-Koháry
- Father: Kardam, Prince of Tarnovo
- Mother: Miriam Ungría y López
- Religion: Bulgarian Orthodoxy

Boris, Prince of Tarnovo, Duke in Saxony (born 12 October 1997), known by his Spanish civilian name Boris de Sajonia-Coburgo-Gotha y Ungría, is the elder son of Miriam Ungría y López and Kardam, Prince of Tarnovo, the grandson of former Tsar Simeon II of Bulgaria and, through his mother's second marriage in 2022, the step-son of Prince Ghazi bin Muhammad, a first cousin of King Abdullah II of Jordan.

He is, after the death of his father on 7 April 2015, first in line of succession to the defunct Bulgarian throne.

Boris, who has maintained close relations with the Spanish royal family since his father's death, speaks Spanish, English, French and some Bulgarian. He is an artist, devoted to sculpture, plays the guitar and was educated at the Lycée Français Molière in Villanueva de la Cañada in the vicinity of Madrid. He completed his International Baccalaureate studies at Sankt Gilgen International School near Salzburg, in Austria.

== Titles ==
- 12 October 1997 – 7 April 2015: His Royal Highness Prince Boris of Bulgaria, Duke in Saxony
- 7 April 2015 – present: His Royal Highness The Prince of Tarnovo

Boris Saxe-Coburg-Gotha House of Saxe-Coburg-Gotha Cadet branch of the House of Wettin Born: 12 October 1997
Bulgarian royalty
Preceded by First in line	Succession to the former Bulgarian throne 1st position	Succeeded by Prince Beltran of Bulgaria
