= Kardam, Prince of Tarnovo =

Kardam Кардам
- Prince of Tarnovo
- Born: 2 December 1962; Madrid, Spain
- Died: 7 April 2015 (aged 52); Madrid, Spain
- Burial: Saint Isidore Cemetery, Madrid (2015–2024); Vrana Palace, Sofia (since 2024)
- Spouse: Miriam Ungría y López (m. 1996)
- Issue: Boris, Prince of Tarnovo; Prince Beltrán
- House: Saxe-Coburg and Gotha-Koháry
- Father: Simeon II of Bulgaria
- Mother: Margarita Gómez-Acebo y Cejuela
- Religion: Bulgarian Orthodoxy

Kardam, Prince of Tarnovo, Duke in Saxony (2 December 1962 – 7 April 2015) was the eldest son of Tsar Simeon II of Bulgaria and his wife, Doña Margarita Gómez-Acebo y Cejuela. Kardam was born after the abolition of the Bulgarian monarchy. As such, it was only by courtesy that he was sometimes styled as if being a crown prince. He was known also as Kardam of Bulgaria and Kardam of Tarnovo, the latter being the title of the heir apparent of the Bulgarian throne.

== Life ==
He was born in Madrid, was baptised into the Eastern Orthodox faith and had a master's degree in Agricultural Economics from Penn State University.

== Marriage and issue ==
In Madrid, on 11 July 1996, Kardam married Miriam Ungría y López, born in Madrid on 2 September 1963, a gemologist and daughter of Bernardo Ungría y Goiburu, a patent and trademark attorney and honorary president of the Colegio Heráldico de España y de las Indias and his wife, María del Carmen López y Oleaga, both of Basque descent.

They had two sons, who are first and second, respectively, in the line of succession to the now-defunct Bulgarian throne:

- Boris (b. 12 October 1997 in Madrid)
- Beltrán (b. 23 March 1999 in Madrid)

== Car wreck and death ==
On 15 August 2008, Kardam and his wife were involved in a serious car wreck in El Molar, near Madrid. Prince Kardam was taken by helicopter to the Doce de Octubre Hospital, while his wife was taken to the La Paz Hospital. The car they were in crashed into a tree, then turned over just ten metres away from a nearby house.

Kardam suffered severe brain-skull trauma and severe injuries to his hands, while his wife suffered a broken elbow, broken ribs and a collapsed lung. She was treated and released from the hospital on 4 September. Galya Dicheva, a spokeswoman for the Saxe-Coburg-Gotha family, confirmed the information about the car wreck and explained that Kardam had undergone surgery in the evening following the wreck. According to doctors at the Doce de Octubre Hospital, Kardam was being kept in an induced coma in August, his hands were paralysed, and reports mentioned that he had lost two fingers. A Bulgarian news agency reported that he was released from the hospital in January 2009, was able to stand and communicate, and was recovering at home. About a year after his release from hospital, however, he suffered a critical setback and was re-hospitalised. He remained in a coma until his death from a lung infection in a hospital in Madrid on 7 April 2015. After an Eastern Orthodox funeral, he was buried at Saint Isidore Cemetery in Madrid.

In May 2010, Bulgarian authorities issued a summons to the comatose Kardam over issues relating to the management of property returned to him, to his father and to his aunt (as heirs to Kings Ferdinand and Boris III) by the post-communist government. Former King and Prime Minister Simeon II and his sister Princess Maria Louisa objected to the summons on the grounds that Kardam was incapacitated.

On 6 April 2024 his body was reburied in Vrana Palace.

Kardam, Prince of Tarnovo House of Saxe-Coburg and Gotha Cadet branch of the House of Wettin Born: 2 December 1962
Bulgarian royalty
Vacant Title last held by Simeon II of Bulgaria	Prince of Tarnovo; 1962–2015	Succeeded by Prince Boris of Bulgaria
