= Hristo Botev Partisan Battalion =

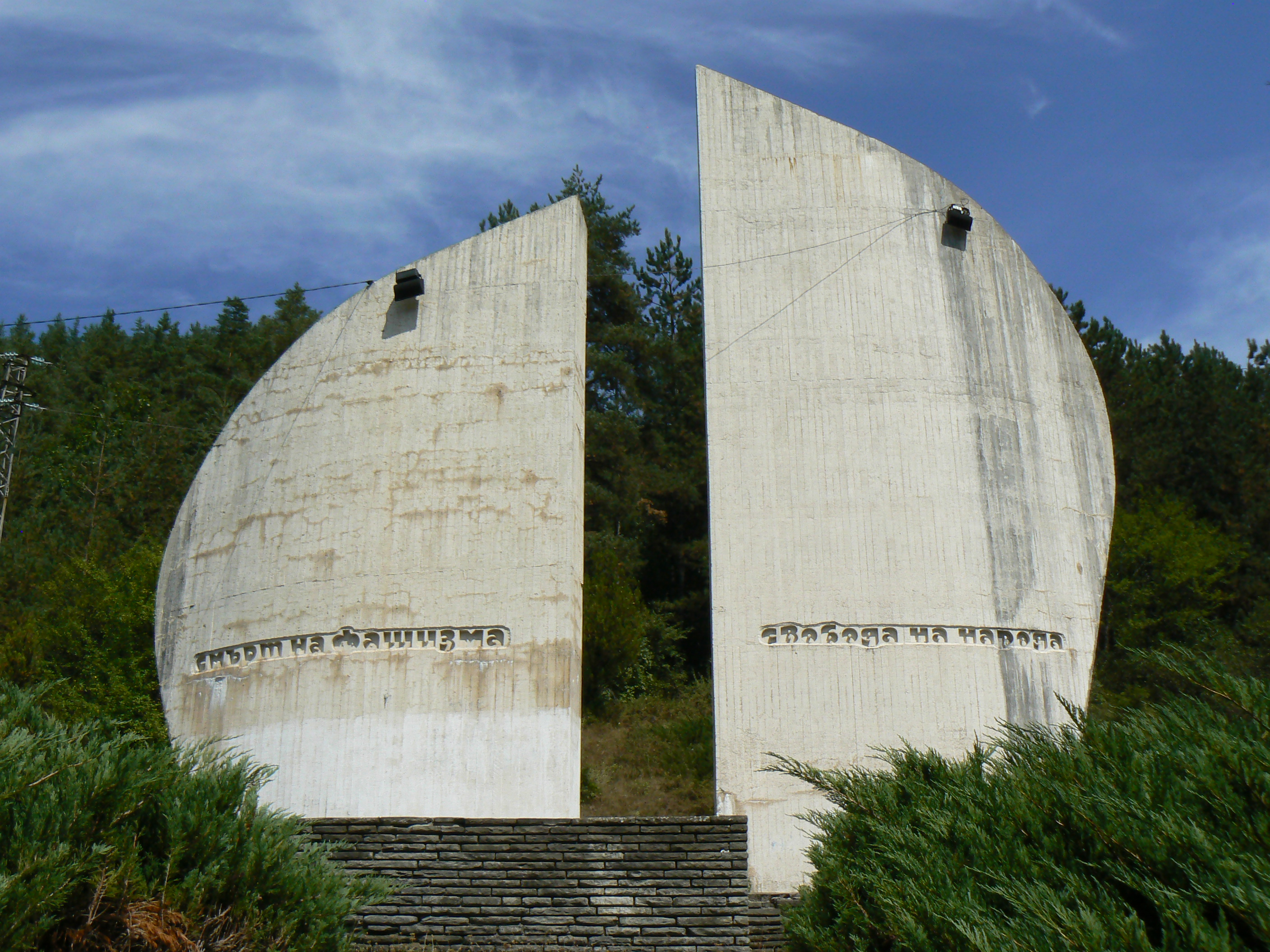
- Memorial to the Battle of Batulia, where the Battalion was defeated.
- Active: December 1943 - May 1944
- Disbanded: May 1944
- Country: Bulgaria
- Allegiance: Bulgarian Partisans
- Type: Infantry
- Role: Partisans
- Size: Detachment, Battalion.
- Engagements: Battle of Batulia

Commanders
- Notable commanders: Dicho Petrov

The Hristo Botev Partisan Battalion was a Bulgarian partisan detachment created by deserted Bulgarian servicemen which operated during the partisan movement in Bulgaria from 1941 to 1944.

It was named after Bulgarian writer, Partisan and national icon Hristo Botev.

== Biography ==
The detachment was formed by soldiers from the 1/15 border subdivision in the village of Konsko, Gevgelija region, led by its commander Lieutenant Dicho Petrov on December 14, 1943. Its initial composition was 62 Bulgarian soldiers and 9 Macedonian partisans. The commander was Lieutenant Dicho Petrov, the Deputy Commander was Nikola Gruev, the Political Commissioner was Hristo Bayaltsaliev and the Deputy Political Commissioner was Mito Mitsaikov.

Until entering the old borders of Bulgaria, the detachment was part of the Second Macedonian Assault Brigade and led military operations against German forces near the villages of Konsko, Negortsi, Gevgelija, Lumnitsa, Fushtani and Livada. It made a transition through the mountains, going through Belasitsa, Ograzhden, Plachkovitsa, Osogovo and Kozyak.

At the beginning of March 1944 they began carrying out operations with the Trun Partisan Detachment. Together with them they formed the Second Sofia People's Liberation Brigade. They were given the task of contacting the First and Second Sredna Gora Brigades of the Second Plovdiv Insurgent Operational Zone. They fought at Tumba Peak together with Yugoslav partisans, and also in the settlements of Kusa Vrana, Vlasi, Transki Odorovtsi, Smolovtsi, Rosoman, Dalgi Del and Govezhda. It also included an English military mission led by Major Frank Thompson.

On May 23, 1944, after crossing the Iskar River, they fought a fierce battle with army and gendarmerie units near the village of Batulia and were almost completely defeated. Surviving guerrillas joined other guerrilla formations, thus resulting in the dissolution of the Battalion.

E. P. Thompson's first novel 'There is A Spirit in Europe: A Memoir to Frank Thompson (1947)' describes his Special Operations Executive brother's role 'Major Frank Thompson' in the fighting. It describes his capture at Batulia and later execution by firing squad by Gendarmerie forces at Litakovo. A re-released and fully illustrated version with map illustrations of the Battle of Batulia is available from Imprint Lulu.
