= Georgi Chankov =

Bulgarian communist politician

- Георги Чанков

Personal details
- Born: December 24, 1909 Mokren, Kingdom of Bulgaria
- Died: July 1, 2004 (aged 94) Sofia, Bulgaria
- Party: Bulgarian Communist Party

Military service
- Allegiance: People's Republic of Bulgaria
- Rank: General
- Battles/wars: World War II

Georgi Chankov Ivanov (Bulgarian: Георги Чанков; 24 December 1909 – 1 July 2004) was a Bulgarian communist politician who held a number of key positions in the Bulgarian People's Republic including deputy chairman of the Council of Ministers. Prior to the establishment of the communist regime in Bulgaria, he participated as a partisan in the communist resistance movement during the Second World War and as a political commissar of the so-called People's Liberation Insurgent Army and a member of the Second Sofia People's Liberation Brigade.

== Biography ==
Georgi Chankov was born on December 24, 1909, in the village of Mokren, Sliven Province, in the family of refugees from the Western Thracian village of Golyam Dervent (today in Greece). He completed his primary education in Stara Zagora and started working at the age of fourteen. He works as a metal worker, brass worker and locksmith. In 1928 he became a member of the Workers' Youth Union (1927) and a member of the District Committee in Stara Zagora.

Participated in the organization of a strike at the "Bratya Stoevi" bed factory in the village of Kirilovo, Stara Zagora Province, in 1929, with a demand for the same eight-hour working day for all workers (those from the village worked 12 hours, and those from the city - 8), for which he was beaten by the police. Since 1930, he has been a member of the Bulgarian Communist Party.

By decision of the Central Committee of the Bulgarian Communist Party in 1931, he went to study at the International Lenin School in Moscow. He returned to Bulgaria at the end of 1932 and was elected secretary of the Central Committee of the Bulgarian Communist Youth Union (BKMS). He worked in this post until September 1934, when he was again sent to Moscow as a representative of the BKMS in the Communist Youth International.

In 1933–1934, together with Rayko Damyanov, he took an active part in the preparation and conduct of the textile workers' strike in Sliven, for which he was arrested and, after his escape from the police station, was sentenced in absentia to 10 years in prison. He participated in the 7th Congress of the Communist International and the 6th Congress of the Communist Party in August 1935. He returned to Bulgaria again to participate in the merger of the activities of the Komsomol and the Workers Youth League. The unification of the 2 organizations ended in 1938, and Georgi Chankov was not included in the Central Committee of the RMS because he was illegal, but he participated in the meetings to ensure continuity.

In April 1939, his future wife Yordanka Chankova was released from prison, with whom she had lived on a family basis since 1933. While they were getting the documents necessary for an official marriage, on August 15, 1939, the police blocked their quarters and arrested them. They got married in the church of the Sofia Central Prison. At the subsequent trial, his wife was released (ZZD does not prosecute relatives who hide their loved ones). Georgi Chankov, with an additional new sentence of one year for using foreign documents, was sent to the Sliven prison, then transferred to the Pleven prison and finally to the prison camp village of Dinevo near Haskovo. During his 3.5-year stay in the prisons, he was elected to the leadership of the prison communist organization. Together with Raiko Damyanov and Georgi Mihov, they run an improvised prison court that prepares newly arrested political prisoners to defend themselves before military courts. Thanks to this preparation, many of the accused receive lighter sentences. He managed to escape from the camp in Dinevo in February 1943.

At the end of March 1943, he was appointed secretary of the District Committee of the Bulgarian Communist Party in Sofia. Between April and May 1943, he was political commissar of the 1st Insurgent Operational Zone of People's Liberation Insurgent Army. In April 1944, he went to the partisan base of the Trun Partisan Detachment near the village of Kalna on Yugoslav territory. On May 3, 1944, by decision of the Politburo, he replaced Boyan Bulgaranov to maintain relations with the Yugoslav Communist Party. Participated in the march of the Second Sofia People's Liberation Brigade from Kalna to Western Stara Planina and in the Battle of Batulia on May 23, 1944. Together with Veselin Georgiev, they escaped from the encirclement thanks to the fact that the soldiers sent against them pretended not to see them notice and bypass them. After a few days' journey and hiding they managed to reach Sofia.

=== Bulgarian People's Republic ===
He was promoted to the rank of colonel on September 11, 1944 (Royal Order No. 116 of September 11, 1944), and on November 18, 1952 (Decree No. 461 of November 18, 1952) and to lieutenant general.

He was a member of the Politburo of the Central Committee of the Bulgarian Communist Party from 1944 (the exact date is unknown, since no minutes were kept then) until July 17, 1957. Simultaneously, from September 1944 to January 25, 1954. is also secretary of the Central Committee of the Bulgarian Communist Party on organizational issues. In this position, he led, under the direct instructions of Georgi Dimitrov, the massive expansion and reorganization of the Bulgarian Communist Party into a governing party of the emerging totalitarian regime. Between November 13, 1950, and July 17, 1957, he was the deputy chairman, and subsequently the first deputy chairman of the Council of Ministers.

In the summer of 1949, when the leader of the Bulgarian Communist Party, Georgi Dimitrov was seriously ill, and Chankov and Valko Chervenkov met with Joseph Stalin, who gave them instructions for the new organization of the party's leadership. After Dimitrov's death in July 1949, Chankov was among the main contenders for his position, along with Vasil Kolarov, Valko Chervenkov and Anton Yugov, but it was decided that the leadership of the party would be largely collective and acting under the direct guidance of Joseph Stalin, with Chervenkov elected as the first secretary of the Central Committee, and Chankov as the second secretary. In the following months, after the death of Kolarov, Chervenkov managed to establish himself as the head of the party.

In 1954, when, under Soviet pressure, Chervenkov was forced to give up his position as First Secretary of the Central Committee, Chankov provided important support for the election of Todor Zhivkov, who began his party career as his subordinate in the Sofia District Committee.

=== Downfall ===
After Todor Zhivkov finally ousted Chervenkov as party leader in 1956, in the following years he systematically eliminated most of the previously influential figures in the party leadership, replacing them with functionaries loyal to him personally, with Georgi Chankov among the first removed with a high rank. Already in December 1956, he was removed from the leadership of the State Planning Commission and remained in the government as deputy prime minister without portfolio. At the July Plenum of the Central Committee convened in 1957, Prime Minister Anton Yugov delivered a report in which he accused him of factional activity and pursuing a line directed against party politics. Zhivkov himself defines him as "a very dangerous... limited person, very difficult and self-confident". He is also blamed for the economic problems in the country, including the so-called "food course", being removed from the Politburo and the government.

In 1957, he was appointed investment director of the Cement Plant in Devnya. In 1959, he was the director of the State Agricultural Company in Svishtov. Due to his deteriorating health, he was temporarily retired in 1960.

From 1966 to 1967, he held the position of minister plenipotentiary at the Embassy of Bulgaria in Brazil. After his return, until 1969, he was deputy director of public affairs (unpaid) at the commercial company "Bulet", where he was responsible for capital construction issues. From 1970 to 1973 he was ambassador to Belgium.

On January 8, 1990, he was rehabilitated following a decision of the Politburo of the Central Committee and the Bureau of the Central Control and Revision Commission.
