= Lev Glavinchev =

Bulgarian officer and communist politician

Lev Glavinchev Bulgarian officer
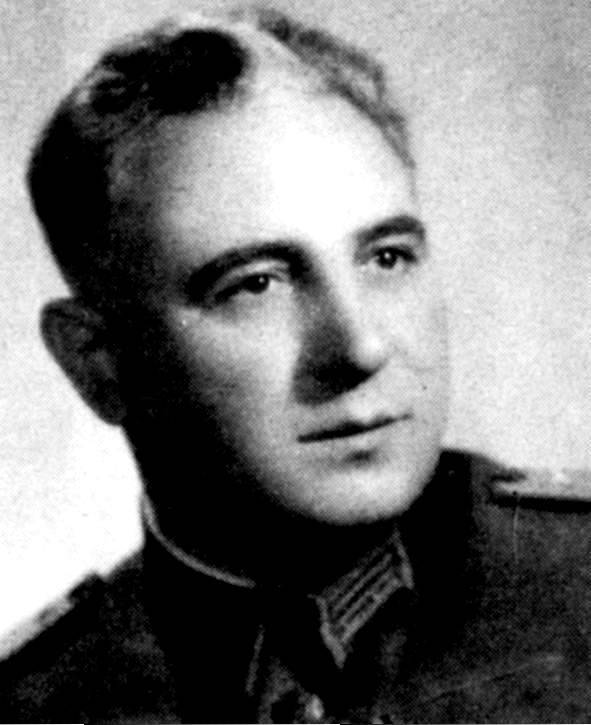
- Born: April 19, 1903; Ohrid, Ottoman Empire
- Died: August 20, 1970 (aged 67); Sofia, Bulgaria

Lev Nikolov Glavinchev (April 19, 1903 – August 20, 1970) was a Bulgarian communist, officer (colonel) and politician. Glavinchev was a member of the Internal Macedonian Revolutionary Organization, and one of the most controversial personalities in the Macedonian freedom movement. An active participant in the communist partisan movement during the Second World War, he was also a commander of the First Sofian Revolutionary Operative Zone of the National Freedom Revolutionary Army (NOVA). As commendant of the People's Militsiya after the 1944 coup d'état, he personally, willingly and methodically killed officers, intellectuals and public figures.

== Biography ==
Lev Glavinchev was born in Ohrid, in 1903. His brother, Naum, was a jurist. After the First World War, he emigrated to Sofia, where from 1922 to 1926, he studied law. He was a member of the Macedonian student association "Vardar".

=== Participation in IMRO ===
He entered the IMRO in 1926, shortly after the murder of Todor Aleksandrov. There was a possibility that he would venture out with the detachment of Naum Yosifov in Macedonia, but was left behind because of his studies on duty along the IMRO border in Sofia. After the July 1928 assassination of Aleksandar Protogerov, Glavinchev joined the protogerovists and lead their punct in Sofia. Along with Pero Shandanov, Petso Traikov and Krustan Poptodorov, they organized assaults against activists alined with Ivan Mihailov. On January 26, 1930, Glavinchev spearheaded a group which unsuccessfully tried to assassinate Yordan Chkatrov. In response, Mihailov handed out a death sentence for Glavinchev, whom was heavily wounded on two separate occasions.

During the summer 1931 protogerovist congress, along with Grigor Petkov, Lev was chosen as a runner-up in the central committee. He was stationed at a camp in Karlovo, but fled his post in early 1934 together with Petar Shandanov. After that, he participated in the preparations for the 1934 coup d'état and in the persecution of Mihailov's followers. In 1935, he killed his mistress in Bankya, hiding with relatives in Sofia afterwards. In 1936, he was sentenced to 15 years imprisonment.

=== Partisan movement ===
While in jail, he formed acquaintances with communist activists, and as a result of an amnesty in 1940, he was released. One theory claims that his amnesty is connected with his agreement to cooperate with the secret police, for which he was personally recruited by Nikola Geshev. Come early 1941 he sympathized with the German forces, which led to him an embroiled relationship with Petar Shandanov, but after the attack on the USSR, he leaned towards the left and participated in the Bulgarian partisan movement. He became a member of the BCP in 1941. He was a member of the Central Military Commission (1942 – 1943), and a commander of the First Revolutionary Operative Zone (May – September 1943) and a member of the General Staff of NOVA (1943 - 1944). Glavinchev was also a cohort of the NTRA's main hub (1943 – 1944). According to some of his contemporaries, he organized the killing of Metodi Shatorov. After the 1944 coup d'état, he actively participated in the communist-backed terrorization of the country, and later in the operations of the First Bulgarian Army against the Third Reich, for which he was promoted to the rank of colonel. In January 1945, he became the commandant of the Special Service of the FBA.

=== Rise and fall in communist Bulgaria ===
Thereafter, he was put in charge as commandant of the National Militia in Sofia (1945 – 1946). Lev became one of the main executioners of former IMRO members. He propagated the ideas of Macedonism and of a Balkan Federation, visiting Skopje in relation to installing the so-called "cultural autonomy" in Pirin. Many people were arrested on orders from the SSA, who were later extradited to Yugoslavia. During the August 1946 trials of prominent members of the IMRO in Sofia, Glavinchev served as the main witness of the prosecutor. He was also in charge of exhuming the bones of Boris III from the Rila Monastery. Glavinchev knew Georgi Dimitrov personally, while Anton Yugov was a best man on his first wedding. He was the arrestant of Rayko Aleksiev, whom he tortured to death. It is additionally claimed that he personally killed members of the Regent Council, which included Prince Kiril, professor Bogdan Filov and general Nikola Mikhov, as well as professor Aleksandar Stanishev and tens of others sentenced by the People's Tribunal. Glavinchev was also the man who put out the warrant for Dimitar Talev's death.

In 1947, he remarried. Lev was a vice-commander of the Border Patrol from 1947 to 1949. He was imprisoned for a second time in 1951 for 5 years, for accepting bribes and illegally transporting Bulgarian citizens across the border, who were then killed and their corpses robbed. During the investigations, he testified to his involvement with police during the manhunt of communists Ivan Minkov and Hristo Koydzhekov following the St Nedelya Church assault in 1925. Glavinchev was sent to the Belene labour camp, labelled a "cultural enlightener".

=== Rehabilitation and death ===
In 1956, following the April Plenum, Glavinchev was released following orders from Todor Zhivkov, and remained a politician for many years. During the BCC's Ninth Congress, he was chosen as member of the Control-Revision Commission. Later, Todor and Lyudmila Zhivkovi would be best man and best maid for the marriage of one of Lev's daughters. From 1960 until his death in 1970, Glavinchev was a member of the Central Committee of the Union for Fighters Against Fascism and Capitalism.

Lev Glavinchev would later die a painful death from cancer. On the day of his burial, his brother Pavel said the following:

My brother killed 226 Macedonian fascists.

A few days after his death, his entire archive was seized, most likely by the Committee for State Security. That same year, grants were given to his family, amounting to 3000 leva. A street in the Sofia neighborhood "Lyulin" is named after him; in the 1990s, it was renamed "Vanche Mihailov".

== Bibliography ==
- T. Tashev, "Bulgarian Army 1941 – 1945 – encyclopedic directory", Sofia, 2008, "Military Edition" Inc., ISBN 978-954-509-407-1, p. 42
