= Hristo Mihaylov =

Bulgarian Communist politician and military commander (1893–1944)

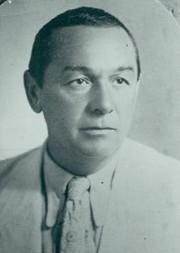

Hristo Mikhailov Popov (Bulgarian: Христо Михайлов Попов; April 18, 1893 – February 8, 1944) was a Bulgarian Communist politician and military commander who was a leading participant of the anti-fascist resistance movement in Bulgaria during the Second World War. He was brother of general and defence minister, Ivan Mihailov.

== Biography ==
Mikhailov was born in Vidin and worked as a school teacher in the village of Izvor from 1911 to 1912. He was drafted into the Bulgarian army during the Balkan Wars and graduated from the School of Reserve Officers. He participated in the First World War and was taken prisoner until his release in 1920.

In 1918, he joined the Bulgarian Workers' Social Democratic Party.

In 1921, he was elected to the leadership of the Bulgarian Communist Party in Ferdinand. He participated in the September Uprising and commanded a detachment during the storming of the city of Ferdinand. After the defeat of the uprising, he fled to Yugoslavia and was sentenced to death in absentia.

In 1924, he secretly returned to his country and tried to organize a new uprising against the ruling regime in Vidin and Plovdiv. In April 1925, he was arrested again and sentenced to death, but was commuted to life imprisonment. In 1937 he escaped from prison and moved to Sofia. He was elected a member of the Central Committee of the BCP, graduated from Sofia University with a degree in law.

In World War II, he was a member and leader of the Resistance Movement. Until June 1941, he was repeatedly sent to concentration camps. After the death of Tsvyatko Radoinov, he headed the Central Military Commission of the BCP and after the death of Emil Markov, he led the People's Liberation Insurgent Army of Bulgaria (NOVA). He is the author of the military regulations of the partisan forces in Bulgaria.

In July 1942, he was sentenced to death in absentia for the third time. In February 1944, in a shootout with police, he was seriously wounded, fell into the hands of the police and was soon killed.

== Memory ==
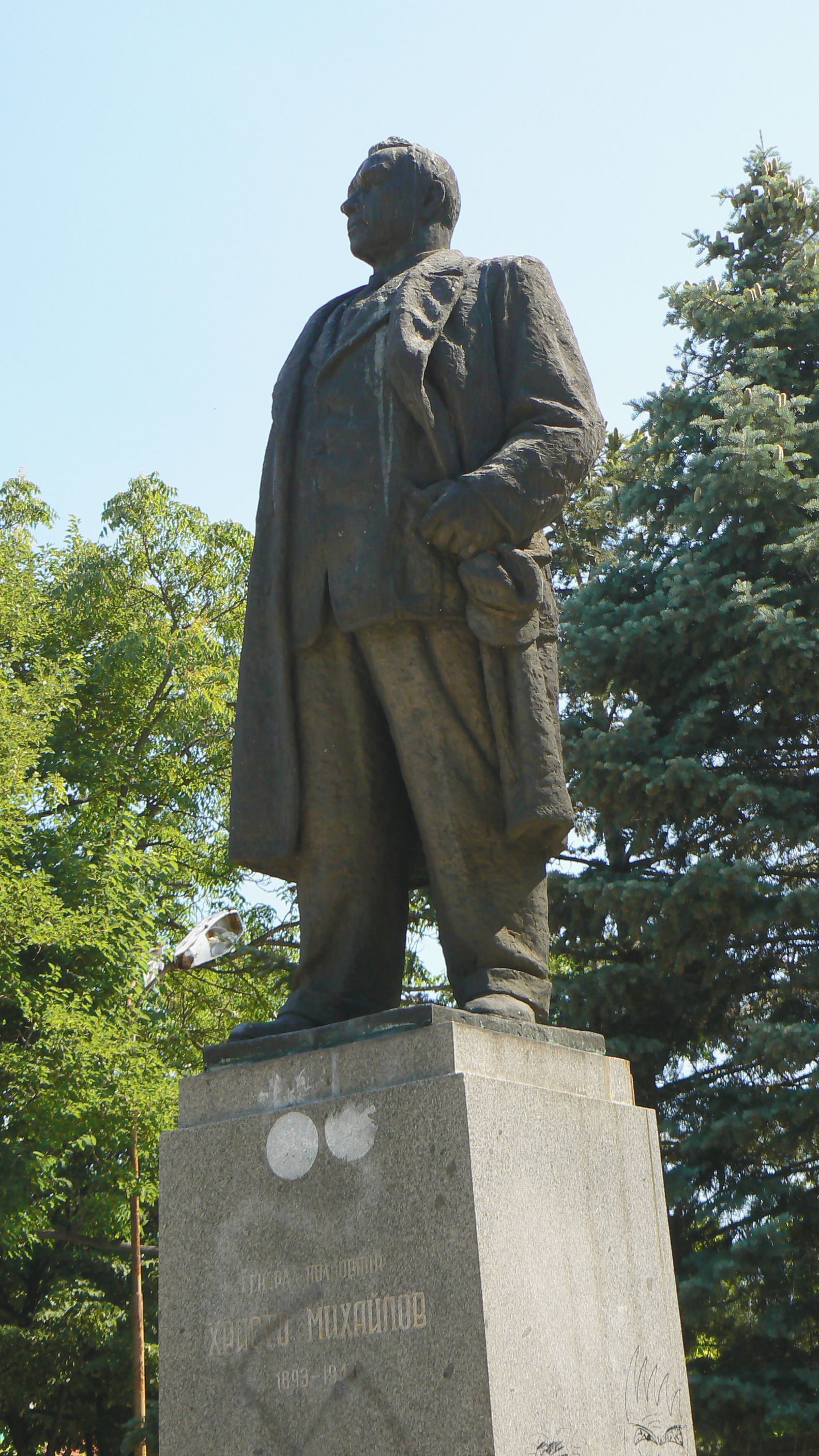
Monument to Hristo Mihailov in Montana

In memory of the leader of the movement, the Ferdinand partisan detachment was renamed into the detachment named after Hristo Mikhailov Popov.

In 1944-45 the government of the Fatherland Front renamed the city of Ferdinand (now Montana) to Mihaylovgrad in honor of his contribution to the resistance movement. Since 1993 it has been called Montana again.
