= Trun Partisan Detachment =

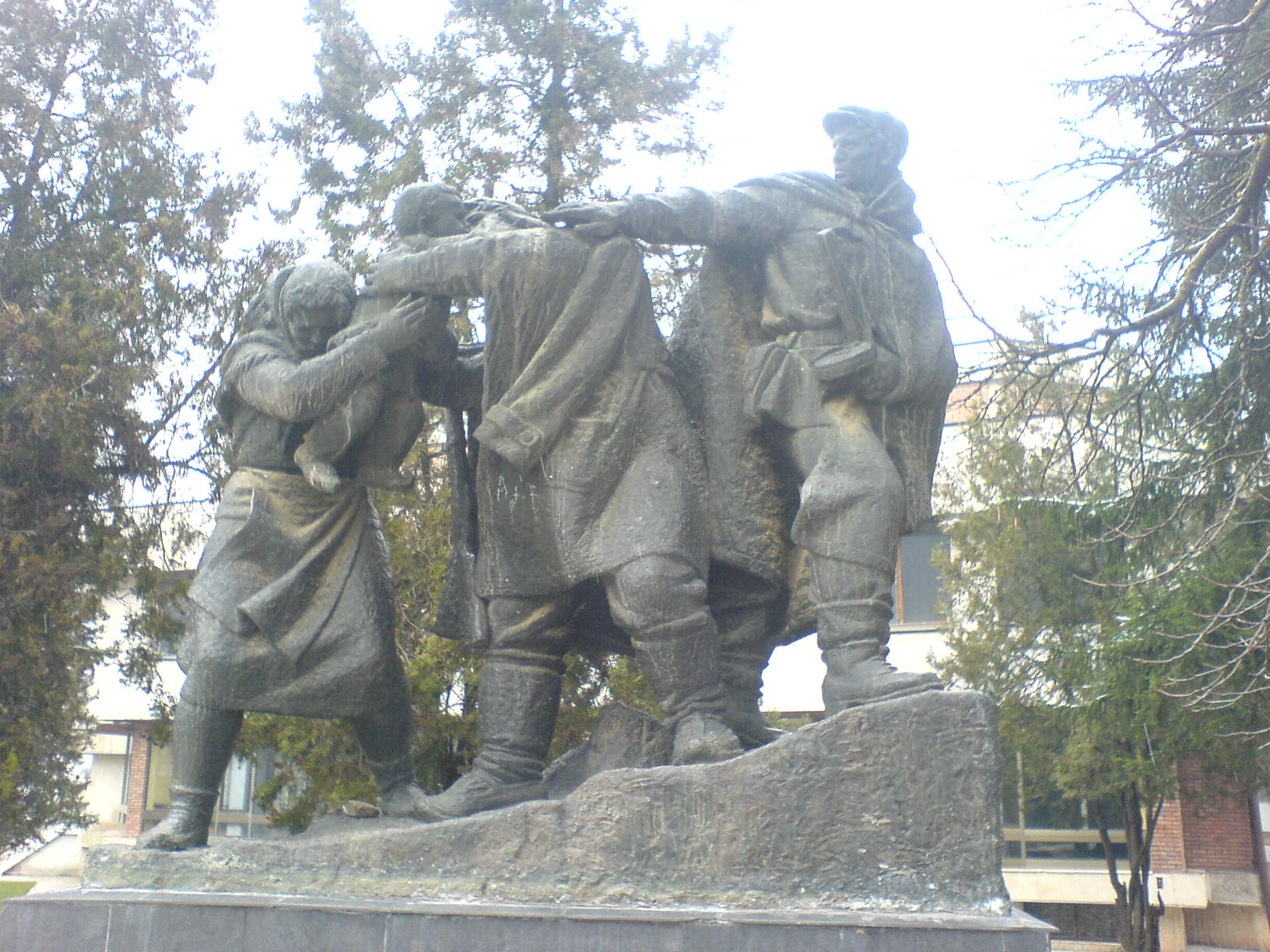
- Monument to the Trun Partisan Detachment
- Active: early 1942 - September 9, 1944
- Disbanded: September 9, 1944
- Country: Bulgaria
- Allegiance: Bulgarian Partisans
- Type: Infantry
- Role: Partisans
- Size: Detachment, Battalion, Brigade.
- Engagements: Battle of Batulia

Commanders
- Notable commanders: Slavcho Transki

The Trun Partisan Detachment was a subdivision of the First Sofia Insurgent Operational Zone of the so-called People's Liberation Insurgent Army (NOVA) during the partisan movement in Bulgaria. It mainly operated in the area of Trun and Breznik.

== History ==
The first communist partisans in Transko began operating in early 1942. They established contact in the town of Vranje and interacted with Yugoslav Partisans. In April 1943, a battle group from the region, established at the beginning of the year, grew into the Trun partisan detachment. The first Commander was Slavcho Transki, the political commissar was Delcho Simov, and the deputy commander was Stefan Rangelov.

On June 16, 1942, together with Yugoslav partisans, they captured the village of Glavanovtsi. In 1943 they carried out actions in the villages of Dzhinchovtsi, Strezimirovtsi, Lyalintsi, Yarlovtsi, Kashle, Gorna Melna, Zabel, Filipovtsi and Maslovishte. According to written sources, it suspended food supplies from Transko to Wehrmacht units in Yugoslavia. On September 7 of the same year, they took part in a heavy battle with government forces at the Yanicheva Chuka peak near the village of Bohova.

At the beginning of 1944 they carried out dozens of actions in the villages of Leshnikovtsi, Turokovtsi, Kashle, Dolna Melna, Gorna Melna and Ushi. They fought with army and gendarmerie units near the villages of Kosturintsi, Groznatovtsi, Borche and Ushi.

In the spring of 1944, the detachment grew to 300 new fighters, this allowed them to conduct dozens of new actions. It was withdrawn from the area of the village of Kalna and the village of Tsarna Trava in order to regroup.

The 1st Battalion participated in the formation and activities of the First Sofia People's Liberation Brigade and the 2nd Battalion in the Second Sofia People's Liberation Brigade. They carried out military campaigns in Rila and Stara Planina. They Participated in the Battle of Batulia alongside the Hristo Botev Partisan Battalion, which was dissolved as a result of the defeat in the battle. E. P. Thompson's first novel 'There is A Spirit in Europe: A Memoir to Frank Thompson (1947)' describes his Special Operations Executive brother's role 'Major Frank Thompson' in the fighting. It describes his capture at Batulia and later execution by firing squad by Gendarmerie forces at Litakovo. A re-released and fully illustrated version with map illustrations of the Battle of Batulia is available from Imprint Lulu.

The 3rd Battalion remained in the original area of operation, marching to the villages of Kalna and Tsarna Trava. It was supplied with British weapons that had been parachuted in the partisan area. In July 1944 the detachment gathered in Transko and fought near the village of Leva Reka, on fought again on July 28 near the villages of Elovitsa and Kosturintsi. They carried out actions in the villages of Dzhinchovtsi, Draintsi, Beraintsi, Radovo, Kosturintsi, Izvor, Dragoychintsi and Chepintsi. The battalion practically created their own free territory. The Trun detachment was one of the most significant partisan formations in Bulgaria in 1944.

On September 6, 1944, they joined the Sofia People's Liberation Division.

On September 9, 1944, they established the power of the Fatherland Front in the towns of Trun, Breznik and Bosilegrad. Shortly after they moved to Sofia.
