= Montana, Bulgaria =

Montana Монтана
- Town
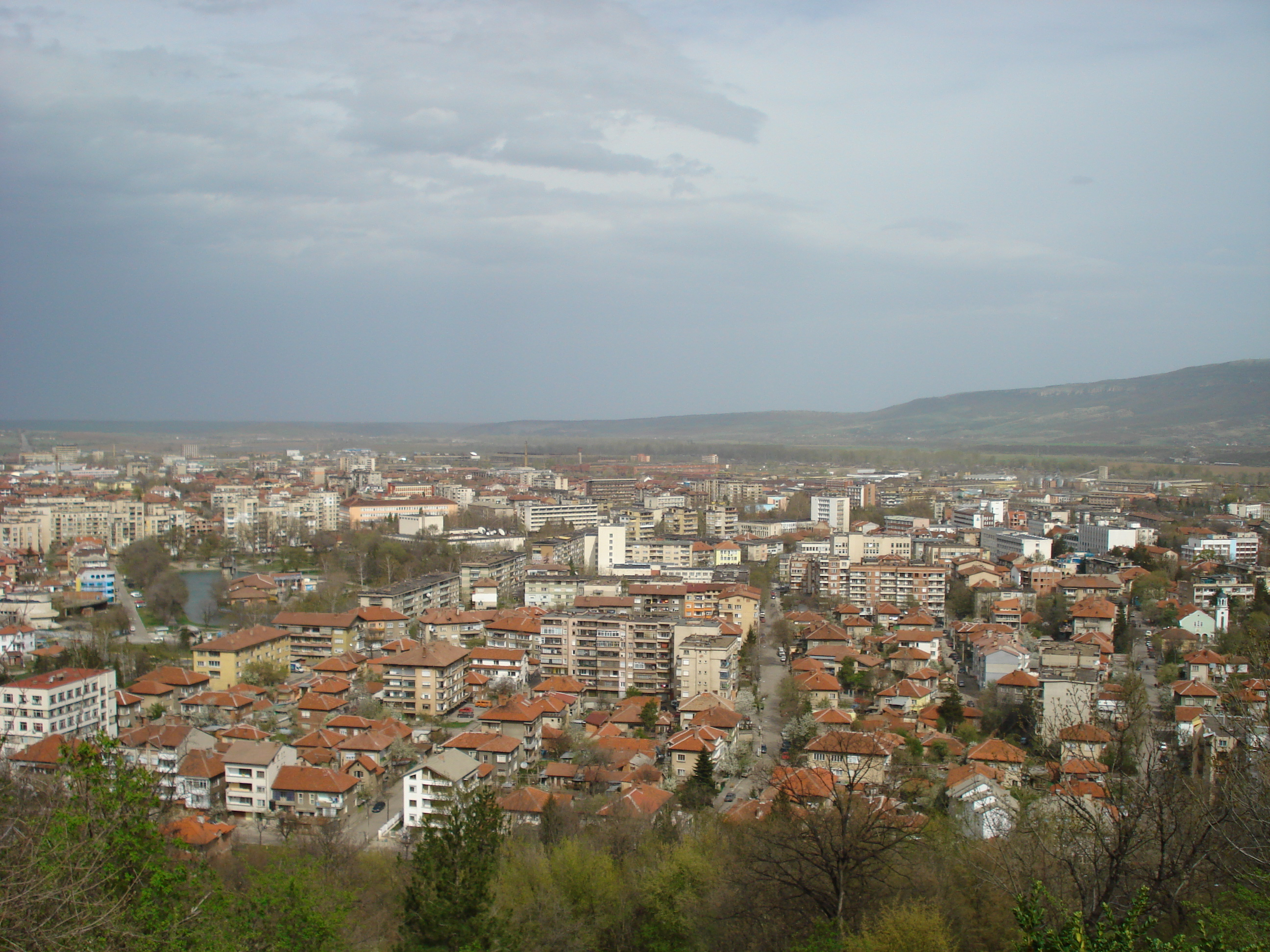
- Panoramic view of Montana

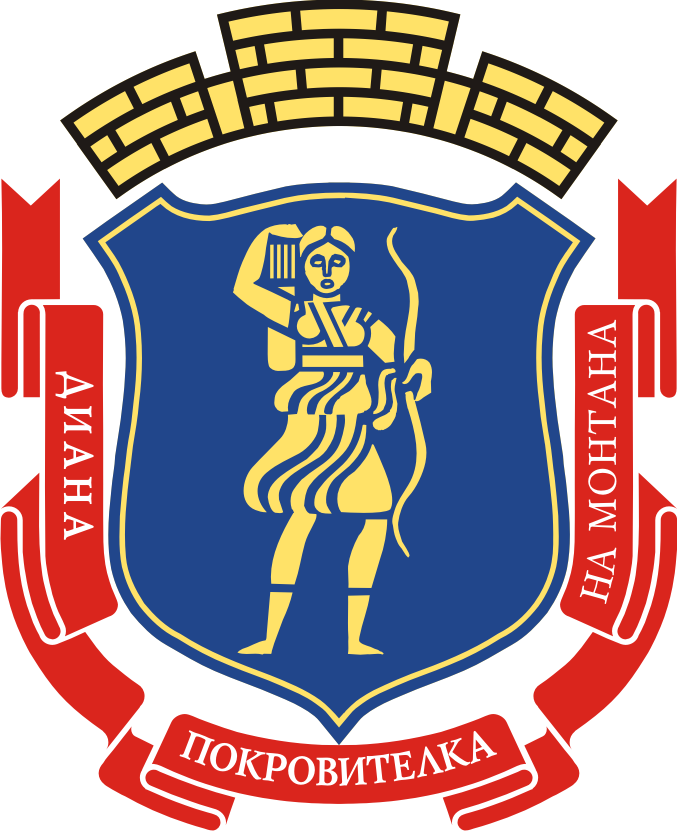
- Flag Coat of arms

- Location of Montana, Bulgaria
- Coordinates: 43°24′27″N 23°13′18″E
- Country: Bulgaria
- Province (Oblast): Montana

Government
  - Mayor: Zlatko Zhivkov

Area
  - Total: 69.235 km^{2} (26.732 sq mi)
- Elevation: 135 m (443 ft)

Population (Census 2021)
  - Total: 36,455
  - Density: 526.54/km^{2} (1,363.7/sq mi)
- Demonym: Montansko
- Time zone: UTC+2 (EET)
  - Summer (DST): UTC+3 (EEST)
- Postal Code: 3400
- Area code: 096
- Website: Official website

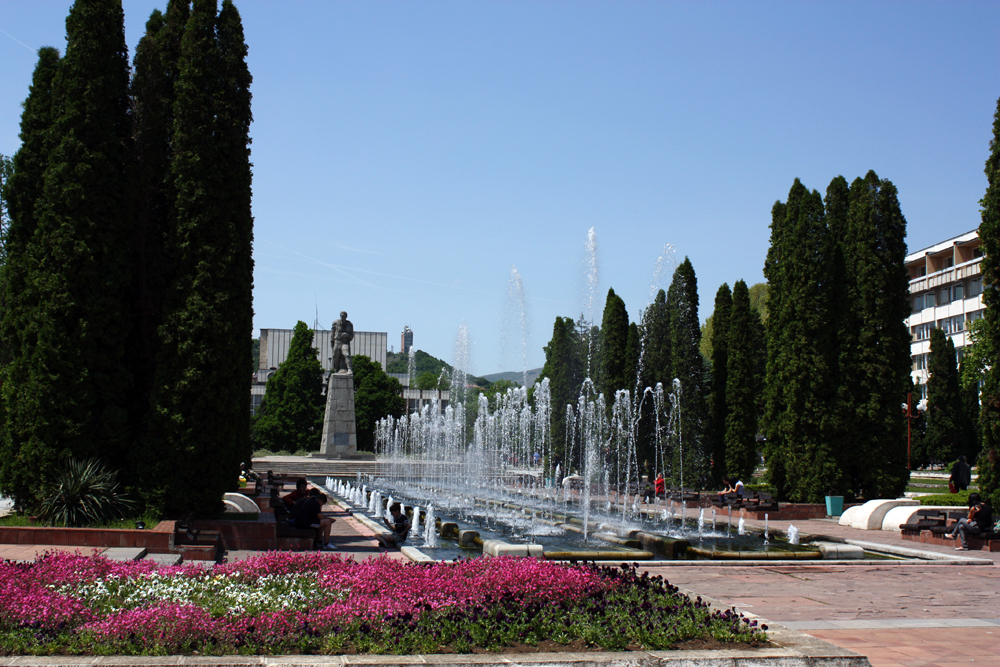
Montana central square

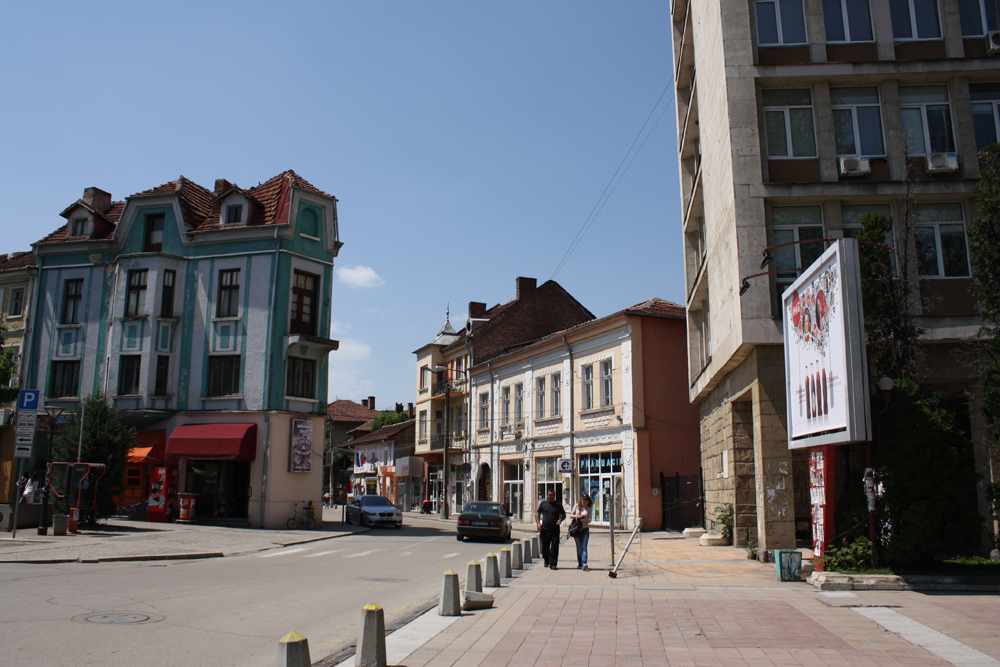
Street in Montana center

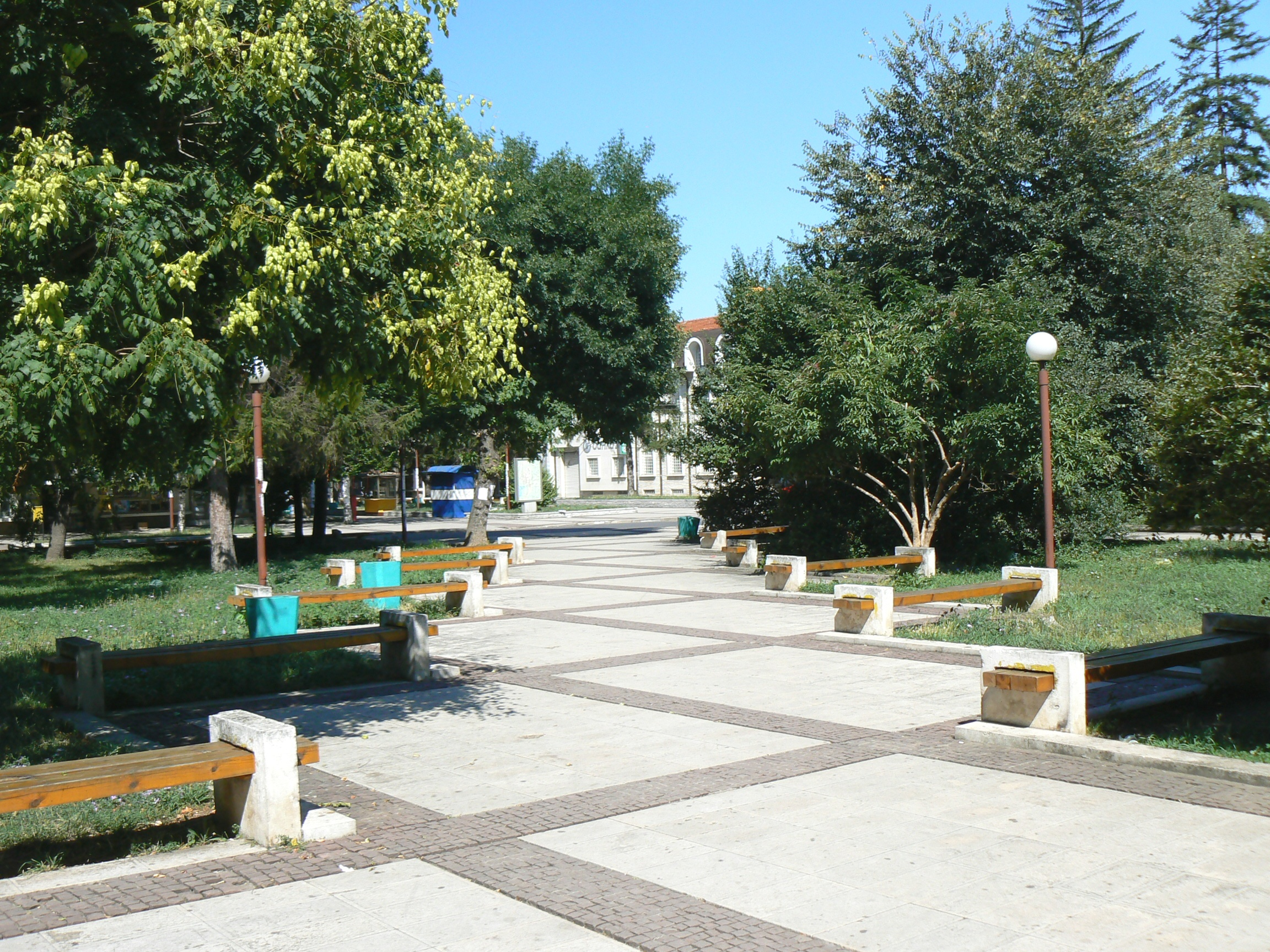

Montana (Bulgarian: Монтана [monˈtanɐ]) is a town in northwestern Bulgaria. It is the administrative centre of Montana Province. In the 2021 census, it had a population of 36,455.

== Names ==
There had been a nearby Thracian settlement, on top of which the Romans set up a military camp, Castra ad Montanesium. When the town was first settled by Slavs it was known as Kutlovitsa; later in Ottoman Turkish as Kutlofça. The town was renamed Ferdinand in 1890, receiving the benevolence of Bulgarian Knyaz Ferdinand and town status. On 1 March 1945, by a decree of the government, the communist authorities changed the town's name to Mihaylovgrad after the Communist Party activist Hristo Mihaylov (died 1944), a leader of the 1923 September Uprising in the region. In 1993 following the fall of communism, a presidential decree renamed the town to Montana, inspired by the name of the nearby Roman settlement.

== Geography ==
Montana is situated on the river Ogosta, north of Stara Planina, surrounded on the south and east by uplands.

The climate is temperate continental, with a cold winter and hot summer. The average temperature is −1.5 °C (29 °F) in January and 25 °C (77 °F) in July. In the last 15–20 years, temperatures reaching up to 35 to 40 °C (95 to 104 °F) in the summer are not uncommon.

== Population ==
As of February 2011, the town had a population of 43,781 inhabitants. The number of the residents of the town reached its peak in the period 1988-1991 when it exceeded 55,000, with the highest measurement in 1991 of 57,142.

According to the latest 2011 census data, the individuals declared their ethnic identity were distributed as follows:

- Bulgarians: 38,278 (91.8%)
- Roma: 3,055 (7.3%)
- Turks: 29 (0.1%)
- Others: 166 (0.4%)
- Indefinable: 171 (0.4%)
- Undeclared: 2,082 (4.8%)

Total: 43,781

There is a large concentration of Roma within the town limits as the Roma are 3055 in the town and 3764 in the municipality, while the Bulgarian elements are 38278 in the town and 47464 in the municipality. The following table presents the change of the population after 1887.

Montana
| Year | 1887 | 1910 | 1934 | 1946 | 1956 | 1965 | 1975 | 1985 | 1992 | 2001 | 2005 | 2009 | 2011 | 2021 |
| Population | ?? | ?? | ?? | 8,049 | 13,399 | 27,040 | 40,197 | 51,714 | 52,397 | 49,176 | 46,866 | 45,350 | 43,324 | 36,455 |
| | Highest number 57,142 in 1991 | | | | | | | | | | | | | |
Sources: National Statistical Institute, citypopulation.de, pop-stat.mashke.org, Bulgarian Academy of Sciences

== Educational facilities ==
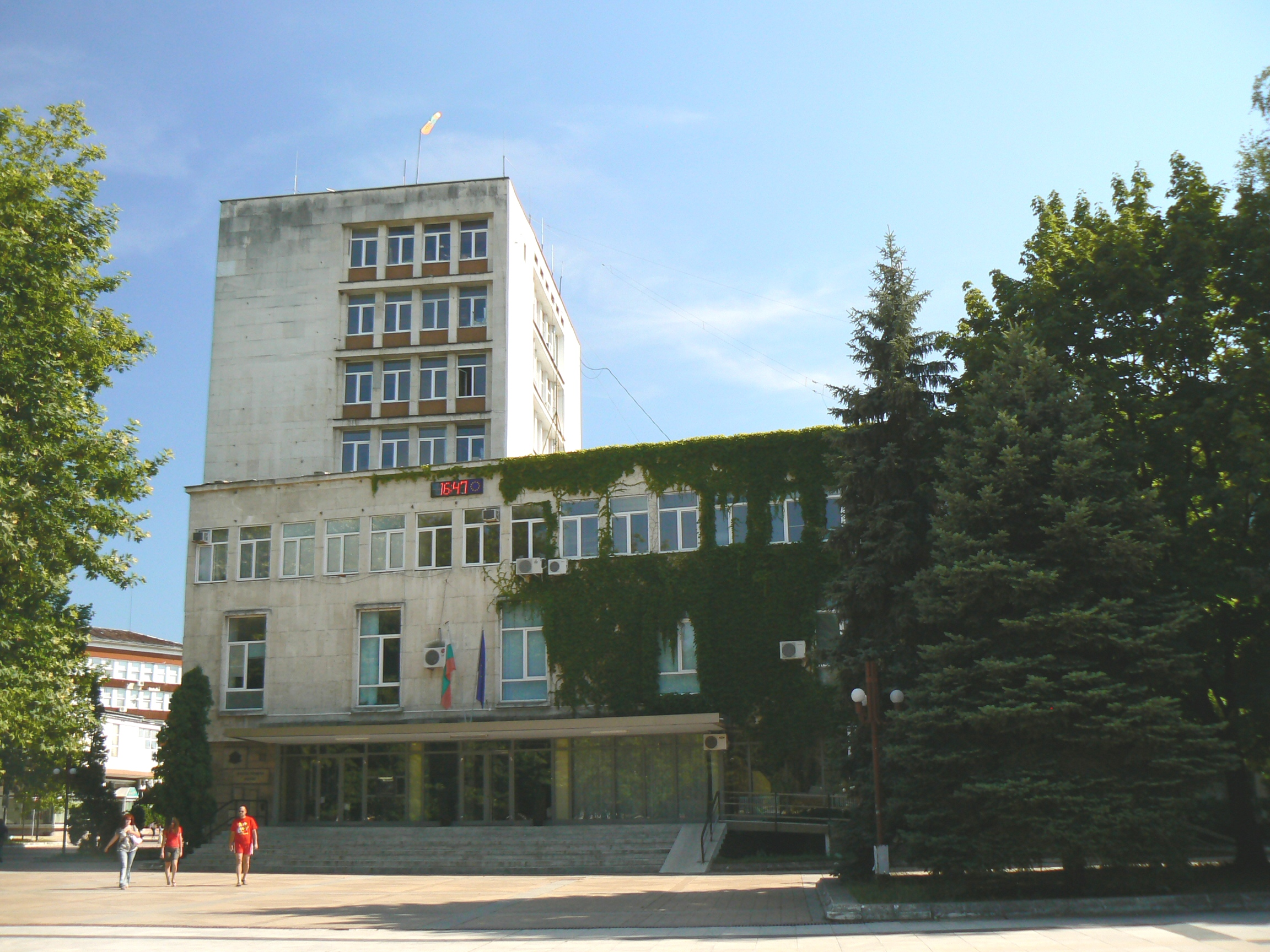
Town Hall

The town hosts about a dozen high schools, two of the most notable are:

- Math and Science HS "St. Kliment Ohridski". Enhanced studies in math, biology, geography and foreign languages. Excellent development of talents and outstanding student performance. http://www.pmgmontana.com/pmgsite/
- Foreign Language HS "Petar Bogdan". Emphasis on English and German language proficiency. Recognized and praised for its scholars' academic accomplishments worldwide. http://gpchemont.com/sitegpche/

== History ==
=== Roman times ===
The region around Montana became part of the Roman province of Upper Moesia in 29 BC. Around 160 AD, a military camp that was most likely founded on the remains of an older Thracian settlement acquired city rights under the name of Civitas Montanensium. The town developed and urbanized after a Roman model and became the second most important settlement in the province after Raciaria (near modern-day Archar). The fortress of Castra ad Montanesium was built atop the hill overlooking Montana, as well as public and residential buildings, temples, baths and theatres. Montana became a typical imperial settlement, where the local Romanized population coexisted alongside Italic and Anatolian settlers. The base of the town's economy was the big landowners of Italic origin and their villas and mansions, while the locals served to work in agricultural production and gold mining in the Ogosta river valley. A community of Greek settlers engaged in craftsmanship and money-lending lived in the town during the period. The patrons of Montana, in the spirit of Hellenism, were Diana and Apollo.

=== Middle Ages ===
Between 440 and 490, the northwest of modern Bulgaria was devastated by the raids of the Huns, under Attila, and later by the Goths. Slavs and Avars delivered the final blow to Greco-Roman culture in the region. The Slavs who settled later in the area called the town Kutlovitsa. During the time of the First and Second Bulgarian Empires, the settlement recovered and became the centre of an eparchy.

=== Ottoman rule ===
After Kutlovitsa was seized by the Ottomans, the settlement was destroyed and became deserted. It was renamed "Kutlofça" by the Ottomans, which was derived from Kutlovitsa. Between 1450 and 1688, the town was resettled by Turks because of its strategic location, and went through another period of blossoming as a typically Oriental town. A mosque, fountains, and other new buildings were erected. There was also a Roman Bath left over from the Middle Ages.

=== Modern history ===
After the Liberation began a massive wave of migration towards Kutlovitsa and a period of economic blossoming. An electricity station, a railway station, a post office and a hospital were built, a fair and a community centre emerged. The football team, FC Montana, was founded in 1921 and currently plays in the Bulgarian First League.

== Notable people ==
- Yordanka Blagoeva (born 1947) - World champion and record holder in high jump between September 24, 1972 and August 24, 1974
- Stiliyan Petrov (born 1979) - Football player in the national team of Bulgaria, Celtic and Aston Villa
- Nelly Rangelova (born 1958) - Bulgarian pop-singer
- Zlatko Zhivkov (born 1959) - Mayor of Montana (1999-2023)
- Yordan Radichkov (born 24 October 1929 - 21 January 2004) - Writer, playwright

== Twin towns – sister cities ==
Montana is twinned with:

- Alpignano, Italy
- Banská Bystrica, Slovakia
- Białogard, Poland
- Caracal, Romania
- Dzerzhinsky, Russia
- Fontaine-Vercors, France
- Medijana (Niš), Serbia
- Pirot, Serbia
- Schmalkalden, Germany
- Vranje, Serbia
- Yinchuan, China
- Zhytomyr, Ukraine

Additionally, Montana Bluff on Livingston Island in the South Shetland Islands, Antarctica, is named after the city of Montana.

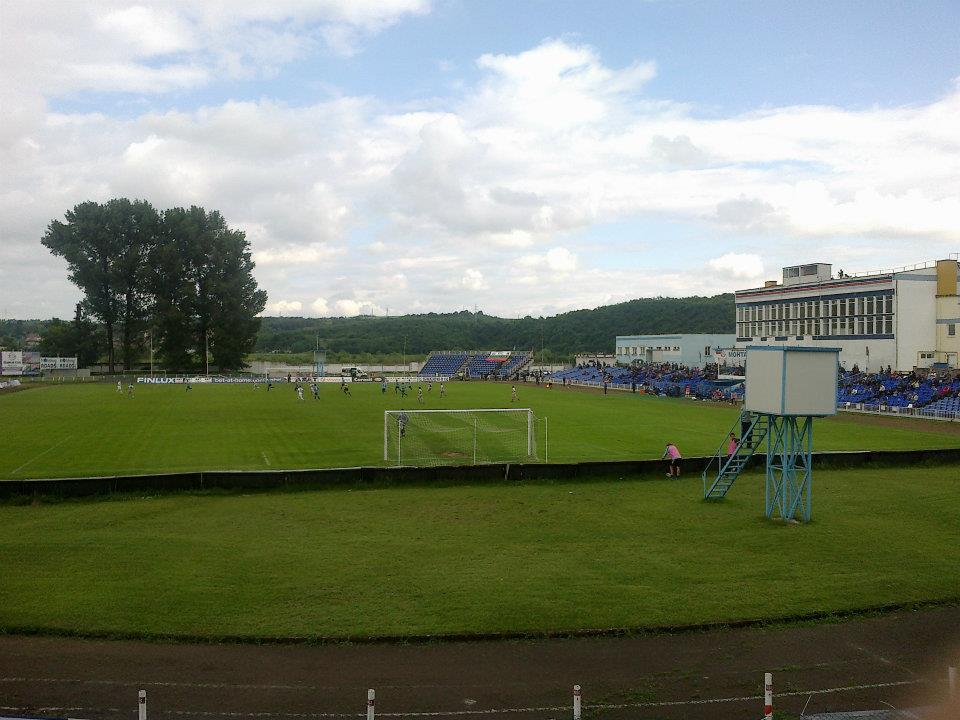
Montana Stadium

== Districts ==
- Central
- Mladost 1 and 2 - large residential district in the northwestern part of the town composed of about 40, built in the 80's, blocks of flats.
- Pliska
- Pastrina
- Mala Kutlovitsa - suburban district composed mainly of residential houses
- Izgrev
- Kosharnik - rundown neighbourhood on the outskirts of the town populated mainly with Roma Gypsies.
- Ogosta
- Zhivovtsi
- Industrial Zone
- Bodur Mahala (unofficial name)
- Barcelon mahala (unofficial name)

== Gallery ==
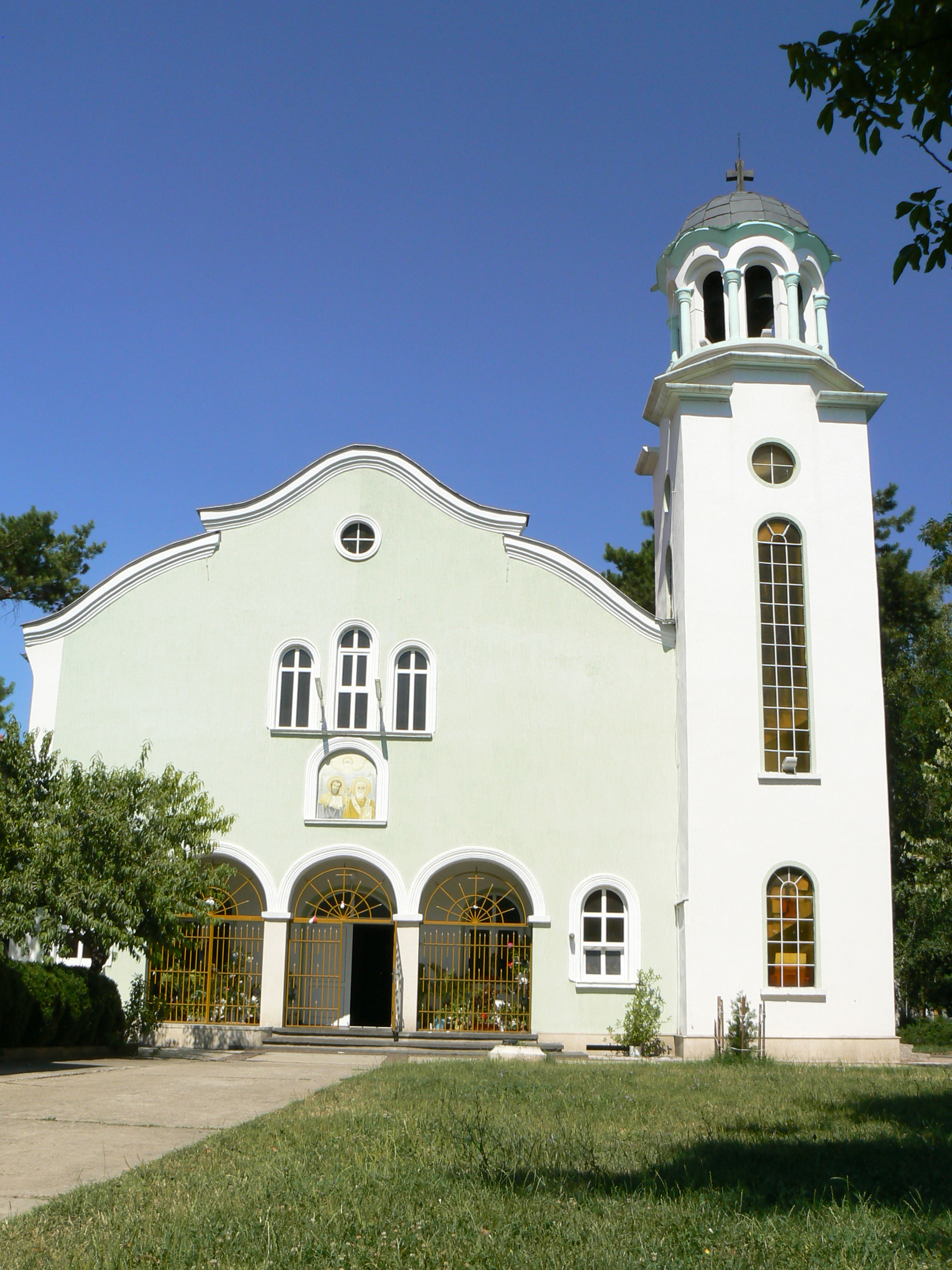
Church of Sts Cyril and Methodius

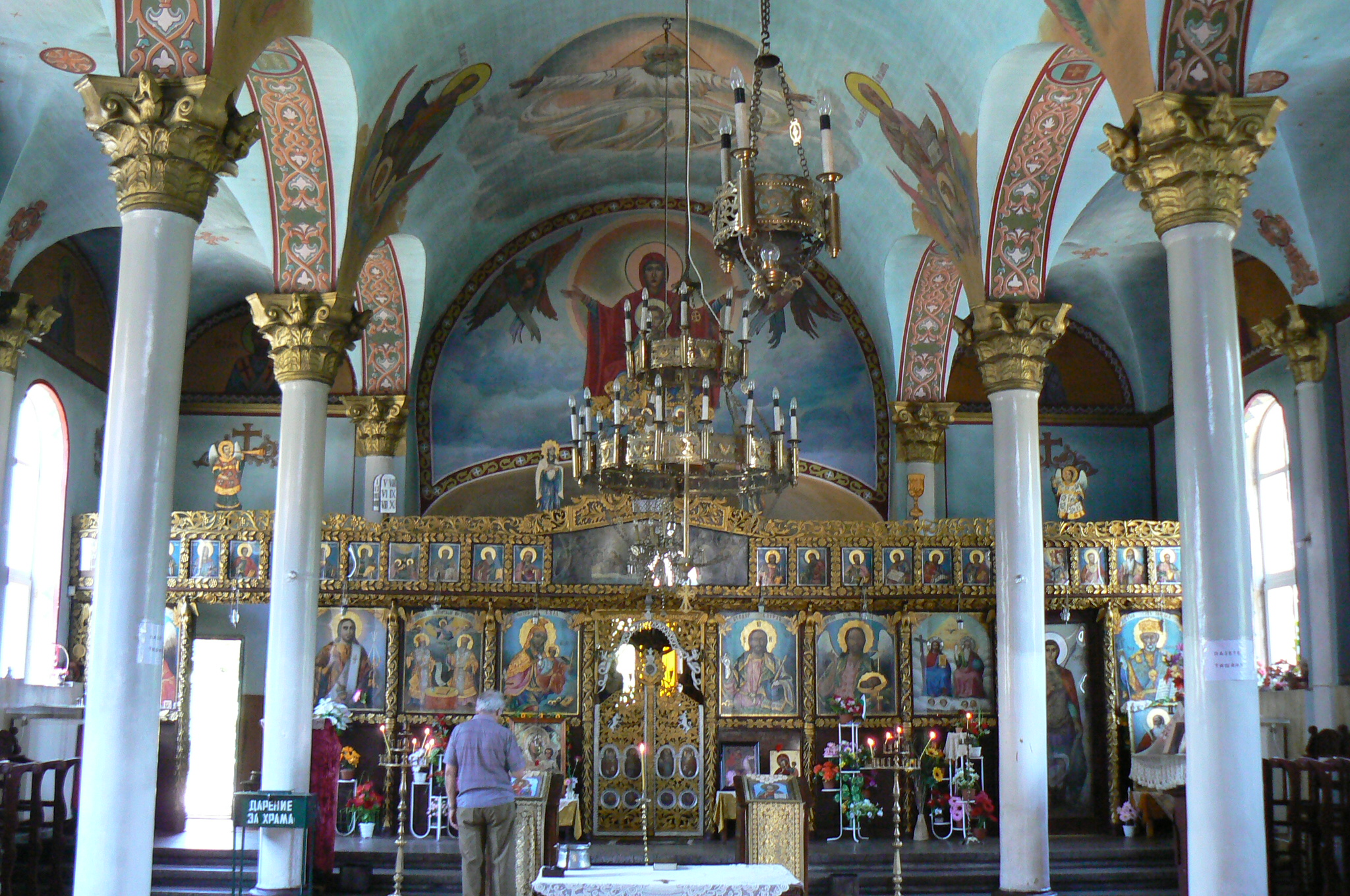
The interior of Church of Sts Cyril and Methodius

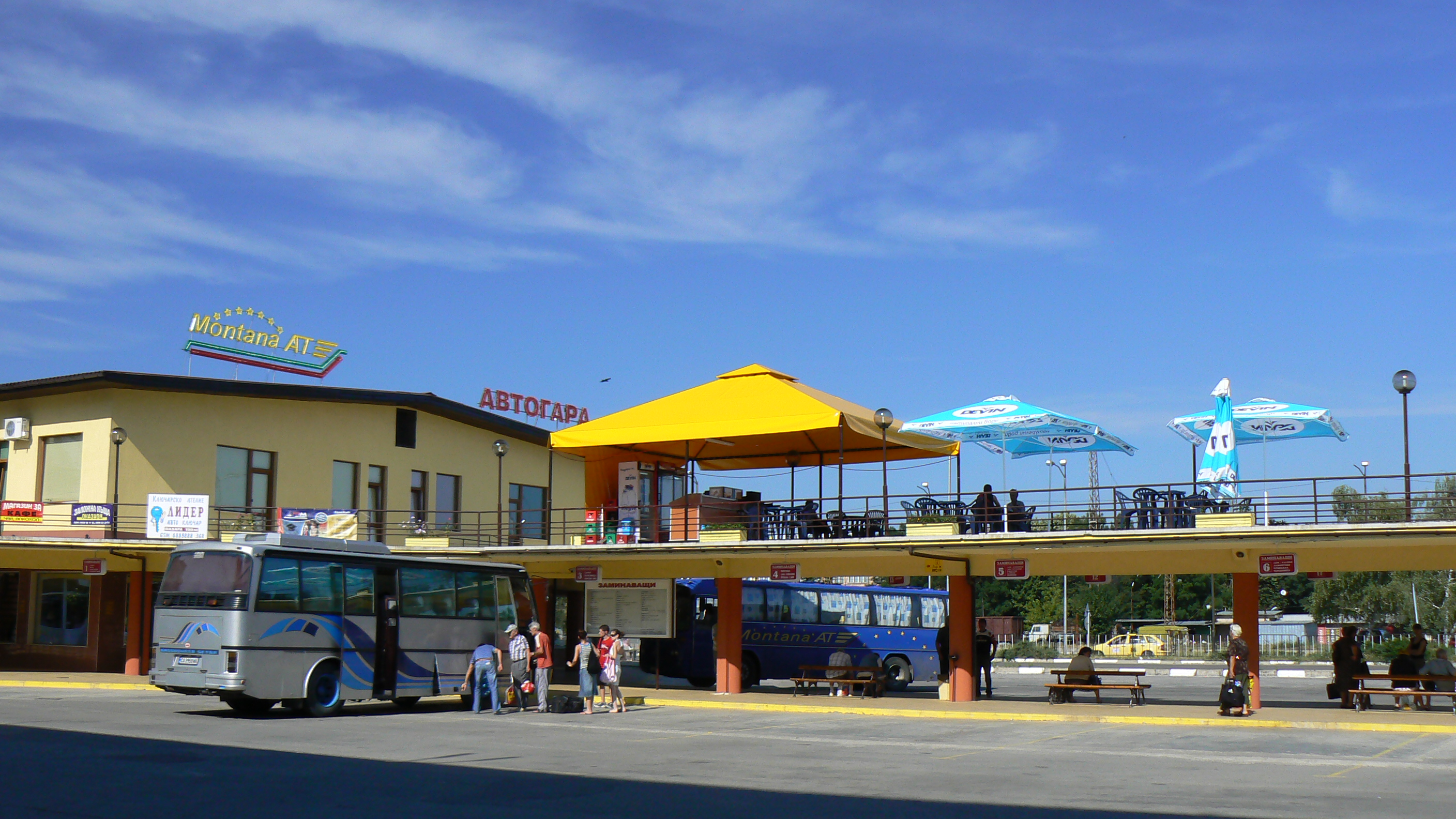
Central bus station

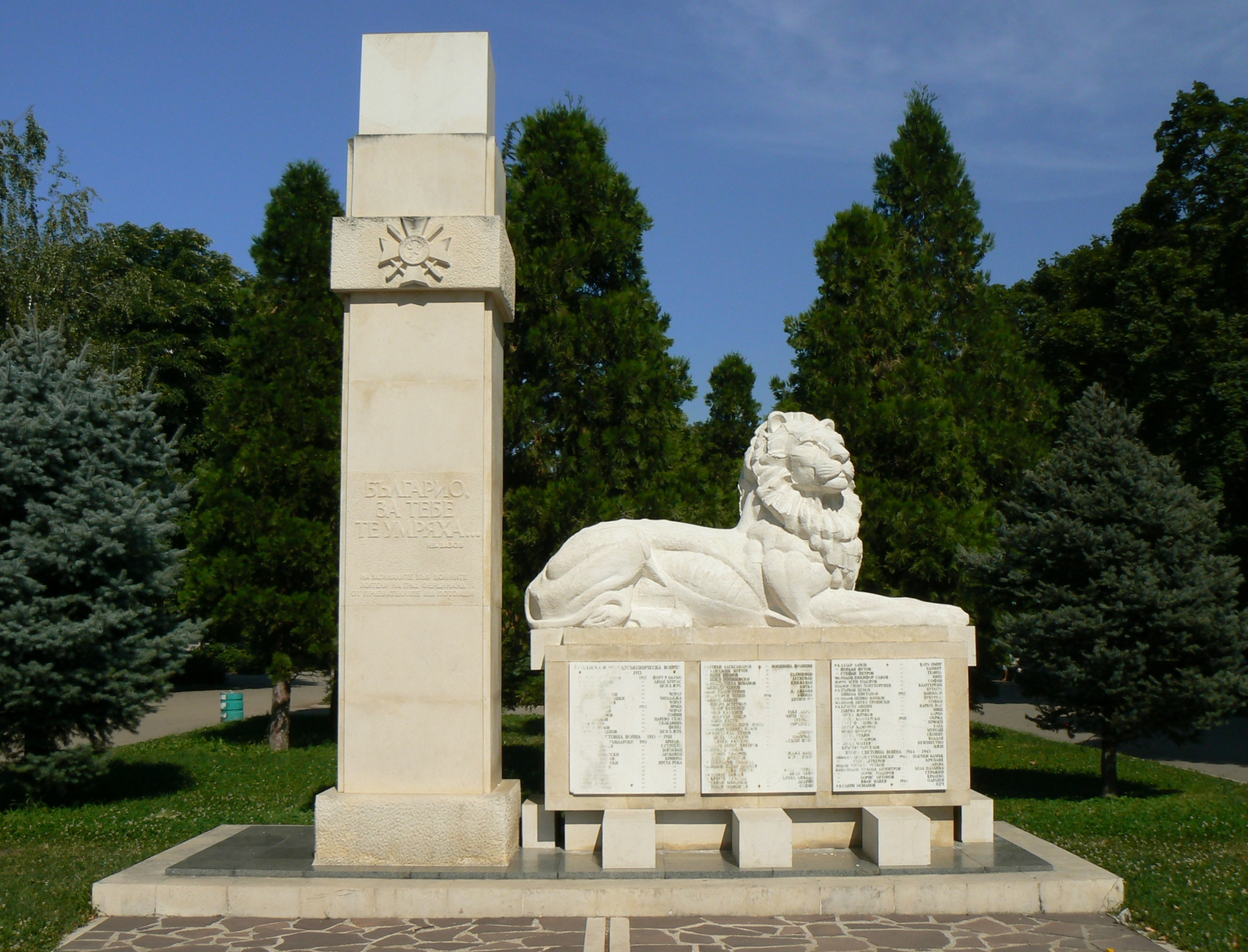
Monument to the victims of the wars

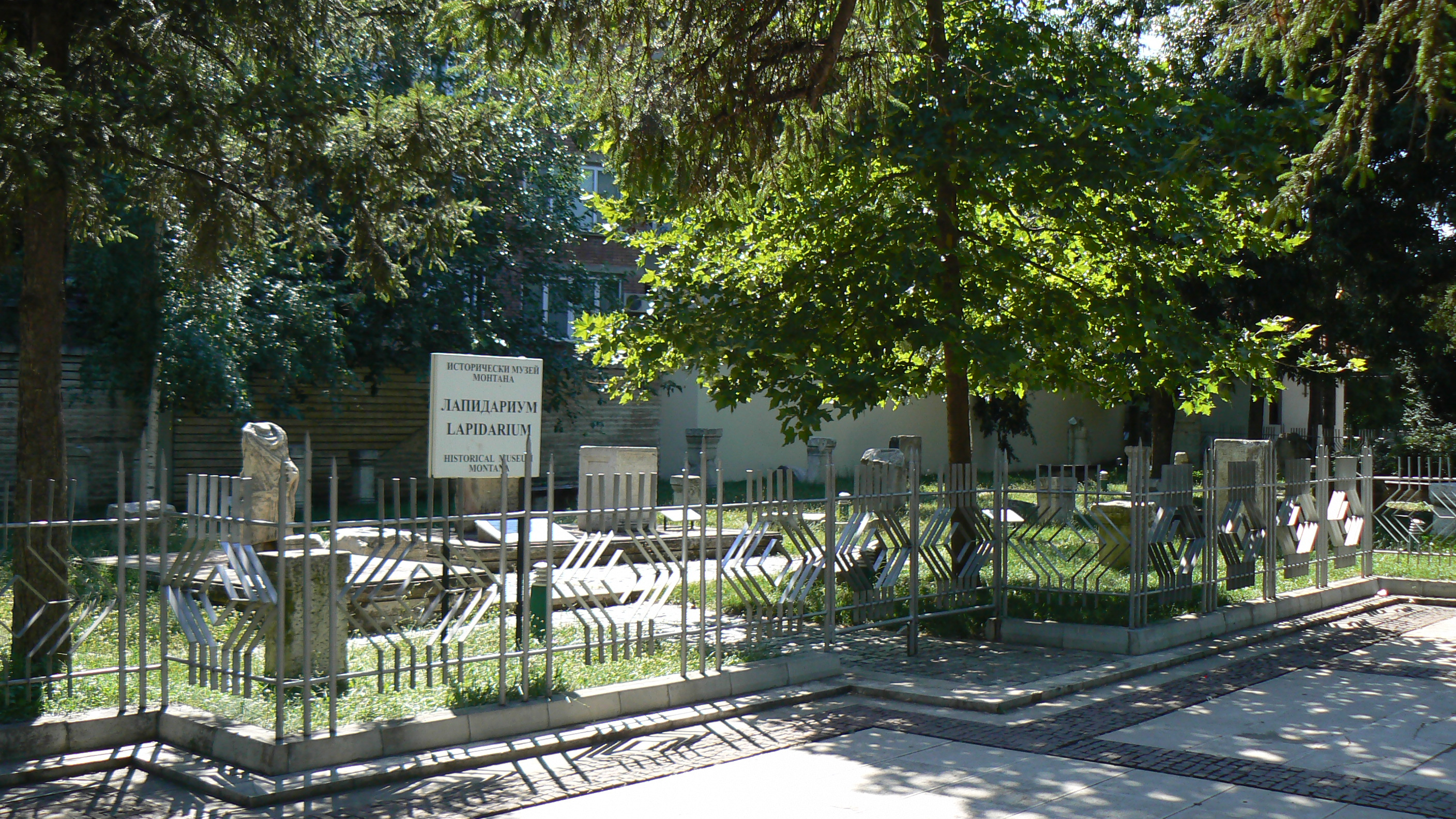
The lapidarium

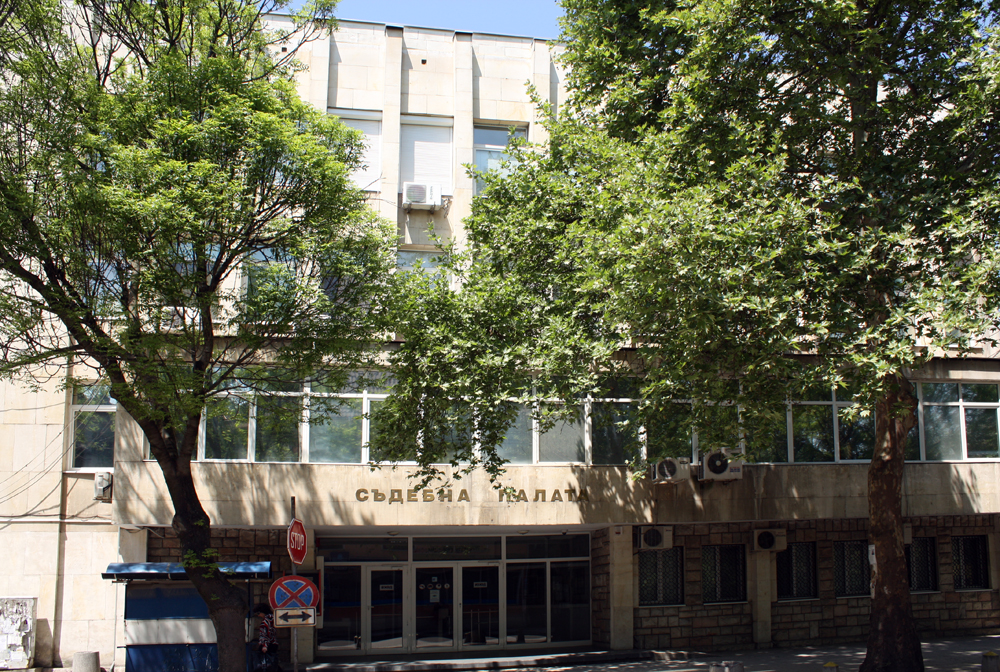
Montana Courthouse

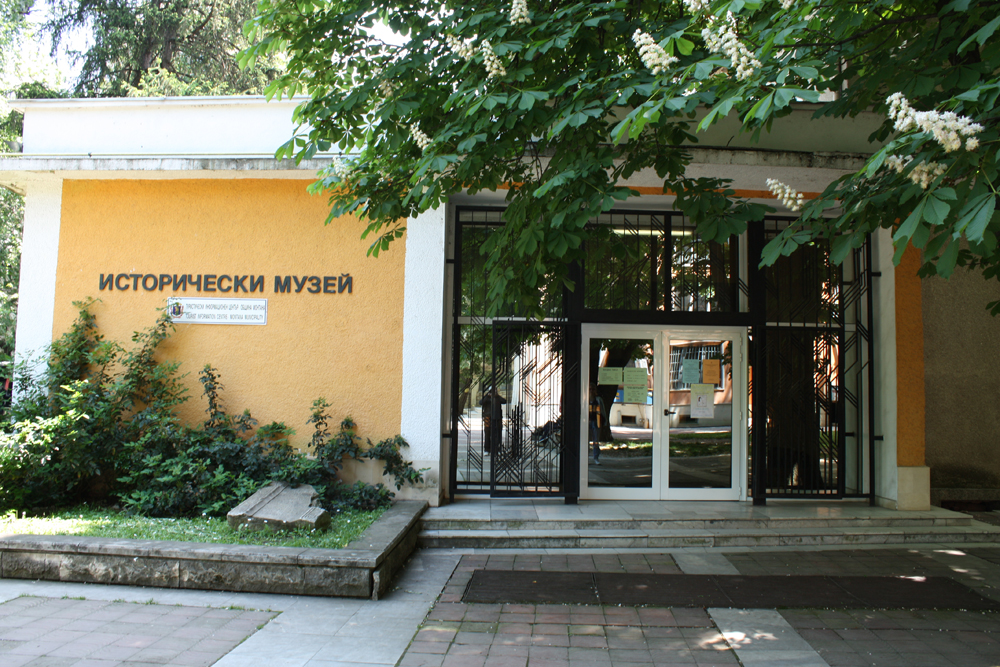
Montana History Museum

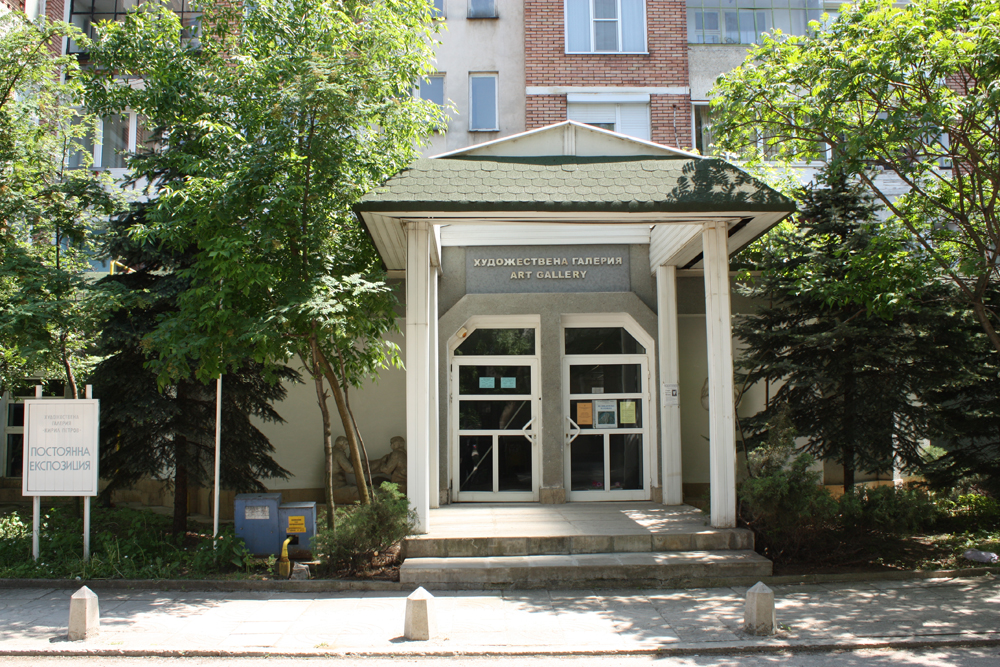
Montana Art Gallery
