= Castra ad Montanesium =

Ruined Roman fortress in Montana, Bulgaria

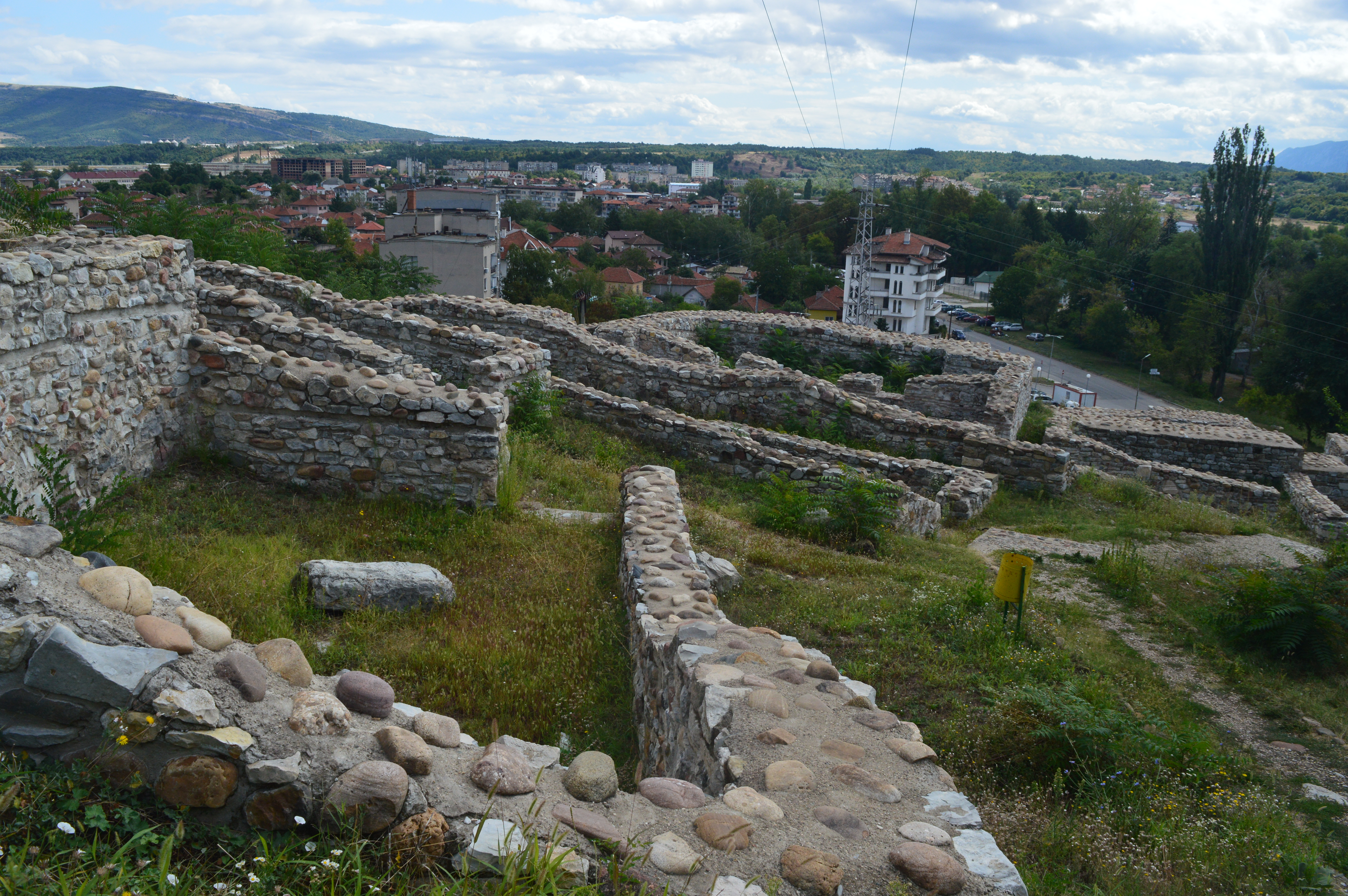
- A view of the town from the ruins

Site information
- Type: Castra

Location
- Location within Bulgaria
- Coordinates: 43°24′5.1″N 23°13′06.9″E

Site history
- Built: 1st or 2nd century AD
- Demolished: 5th or 6th century AD

Castra ad Montanesium is a ruined Roman fortress in the town of Montana, Bulgaria. It was built as the town grew to greater importance as a Roman settlement.

== Description ==
The site is located in the southwest part of Montana on Kaleto Hill, on the way to the Ogosta Dam and near the dam wall. The site is still being investigated, but can be visited. Near the entrance of fortress are the ruins of the basilica. The built tourist path passes along it and leads to the fortress walls, behind which there is another church, though it is smaller.

== History ==
The fortress was constructed in the first century AD to give a defensive buff to the Roman town of Montanesium. During the reign of Constantine the Great (306-337) an early Christian basilica was constructed adjacent to the complex.

Between 440 and 490, the northwest of modern Bulgaria was devastated by the raids of the Huns, under Attila, and the Goths. Later raids by the Slavs and Avars between 500 and 560 resulted in the destruction of the fortress down to its foundations, along with most of Montanesium.

In the early 2010s, an initiative was undertaken to restore parts of the basilica and fortress, as a part of the second stage of the EU's Regional development program.

== Significance ==
The fortress is a central part of Montana's history, culture and tourism, being one of the oldest and most impressive structures in the town.

The fortress walls appear at the top of Montana's coat of arms. The Roman goddess Diana also appears on the coat of arms, showing the town's still present Roman influence.
