= Dobri Terpeshev =

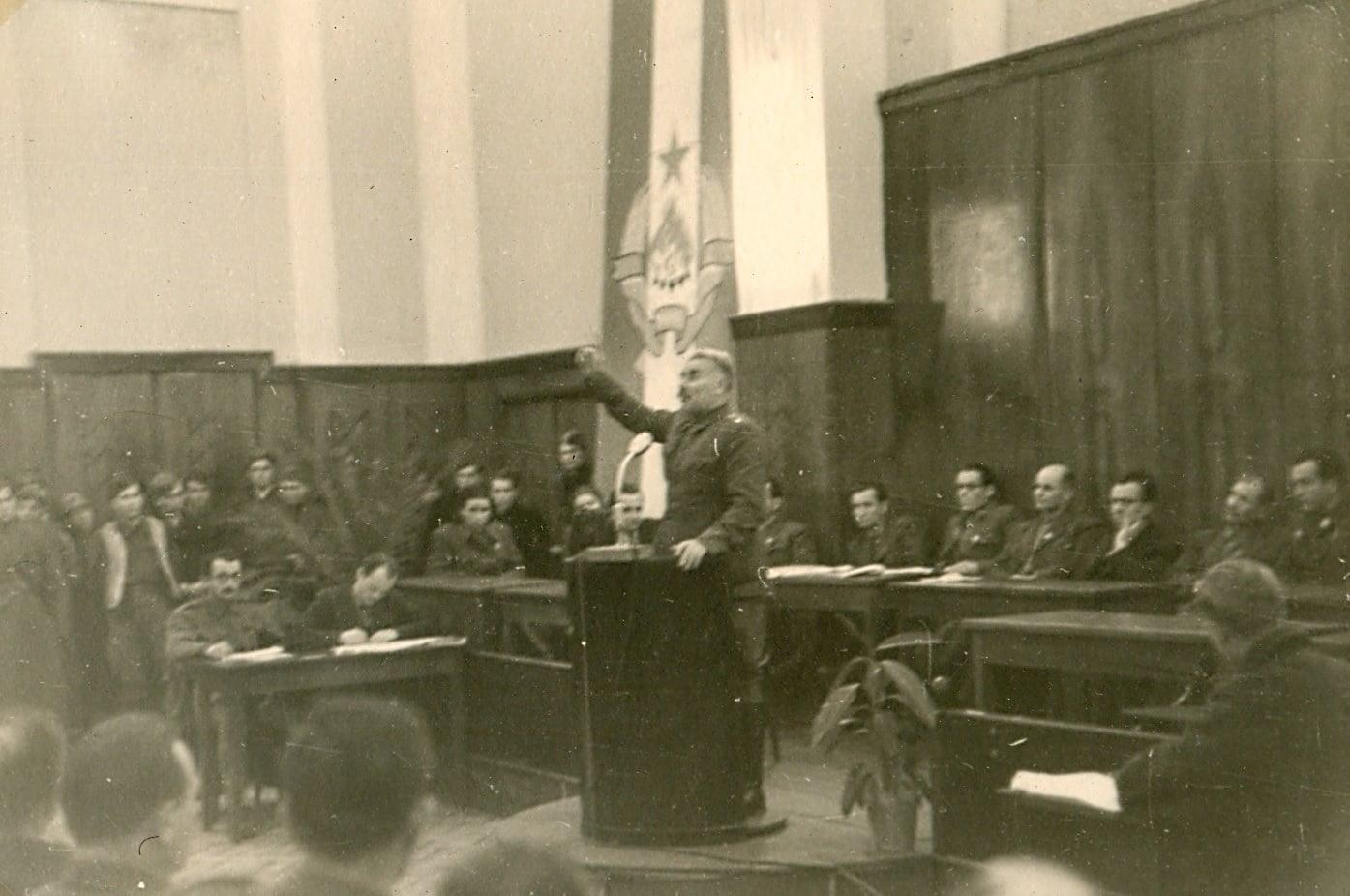
Terpeshev giving a speech at the Second Congress of the ASNOM, 1944

Dobri Kolev Terpeshev (Bulgarian: Добри Колев Терпешев; 15 May 1884 — 15 January 1967) was a Bulgarian Communist politician, resistance fighter and later a statesman in the People's Republic of Bulgaria.

== Biography ==
Terpeshev was born Izvorovo. He was a member of the Bulgarian Workers' Social Democratic Party since 1903. He was mobilized during the Balkan Wars and was sentenced to death in 1912 for anti-war activities however was later pardoned.

In the 1920s he was a commander of the Military Organization of the Bulgarian Communist Party. He was sentenced to death during the April events in Bulgaria in 1925 which occurred after the St Nedelya Church assault. His sentence was lowered and he was imprisoned until 1937. In 1938 he became a member of the Central Committee of the BCP.

In 1941 he was arrested and imprisoned, from where he escaped in 1943. After his escape, Terpeshev became a member of the Politburo of the BCP and soon established himself as one of the most authoritative member of the party leadership in the country. He was commander of the People's Liberation Insurgent Army (NOVA) and was among the Chief organizer of the resistance movement during the Second World War.

After the overthrow of the government of Ivan Bagryanov, he negotiated with the cabinet of Konstantin Muraviev for a peaceful transfer of power into the hands of the Fatherland Front. Terpeshev was among the main figures in the seizure of power of September 1944.

He was a Minister without portfolio from 1944 to 1947. From 1945 to 1950 he served as Chairman of the Supreme Economic Council and the later the State Planning Commission. He was Deputy Chairman of the Council of Ministers from 1949 to 1950. He was a Member of the National Assembly from 1945 to 1957.

Terpeshev was president of the International Federation of Resistance Fighters – Association of Anti-Fascists from 1948 to 1950.

In 1950, after the trial against Traicho Kostov, he was removed from the Politburo, accused of failing to inform the party leadership in a timely manner of Traicho Kostov's "anti-Soviet" activities. At the April plenum of the Central Committee of the Bulgarian Communist Party in 1956, Terpeshev exposed Todor Zhivkov's insignificant participation in the partisan movement and gave a speech against his election as the new general secretary of the BCP.

Because of his opposition to Zhivkov, he was removed from the Central Committee and other government positions. In 1961 his pension was taken away, in 1964 he was deported from Sofia to Pleven. He died in 1967 at the age of 83.
