= Zlatko Zhivkov =

Bulgarian politician

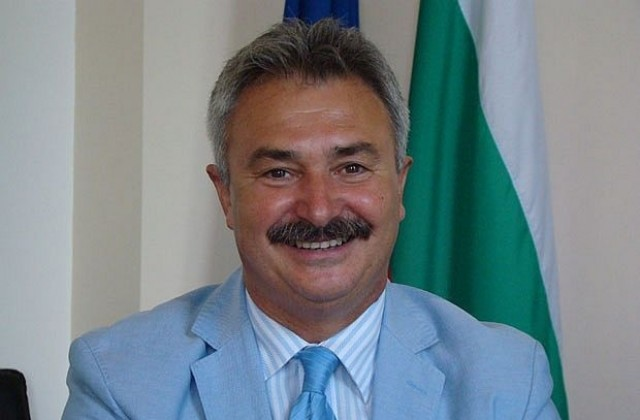

Zlatko Sofroniev Zhivkov (Bulgarian: Златко Софрониев Живков) is a Bulgarian politician. He has been the mayor of the Montana Municipality since 1999.

== Biography ==
Zhivkov was born on 5 November 1959 in Boychinovtsi to a seamstress and factory worker. He was raised in the village of Trifonovo, located 8 km (5.0 mi) from Montana.

Zhivkov attained a master's degree in history from the Veliko Tarnovo University. He later specialized in the history of the Bulgarian Revival at Sofia University. In 1985, he was hired as a history teacher at Yordan Radichkov High School in the city of Montana before becoming the school's director in 1993. From 1997 to 1999, Zhivkov was head of the Education Inspectorate of the Ministry of Education and Science in Montana Province. He ran for mayor of Montana in 1999 and won as a candidate for the Union of Democratic Forces. Since 2003, Zhivkov has been an independent and was endorsed by the Union of Democratic Forces, GERB, Bulgarian New Democracy, IMRO, the Bulgarian National Movement, and the Agrarian People's Union for his last candidacy. Bulgarian prime minister and founding chairman of GERB Boyko Borisov personally endorsed Zhivkov in a video.

In 2019, Zhivkov was awarded Mayor of the Year and re-elected for his sixth consecutive term.

In 2023, Zhivkov was re-elected for his seventh consecutive term, which makes him the longest-standing mayor in a major Bulgarian city.

Zhivkov has two children with his wife Albena: poet Antina and Orlin, also known as the music producer and artist ORLI ANROW. In addition to Bulgarian, he fluently speaks Russian.

== Political activity ==
As mayor of Montana, Zhivkov has managed the city municipality for six consecutive terms (1999–2023). He served as deputy chairman of the Namib Managing Board from 2007 to 2011. He was also a member of the NAMRB Managing Board from 2015 to 2019. He has been a member of the European Committee of Regions since 2007. He is also a member of the CoR Commission for Social Policy, Education, Employment, Research and Culture and Commission for Economic Policy. Zhivkov is the chairman of the Managing Board of the Regional Development Agency and Business Centre 2000 – Montana and is also a member of the Rotary Club in Montana. Despite his long tenure as mayor of a major Bulgarian city, Zhivkov is best known for sponsoring sports activities in Montana. The local teams he has supported include football club FC Montana, basketball team WBC Montana 2003, and Montana's volleyball team. While studying in Veliko Tarnovo, Zhivkov played football alongside popular Bulgarian football players like Krasimir Balakov and Trifon Ivanov.
