= Kusa Vrana =

- Village
- Location within Serbia
- Coordinates: 42°58′40″N 22°33′49″E
- Country: Serbia
- Region: Southern and Eastern Serbia
- District: Pirot
- Municipality: Dimitrovgrad

Population (2002)
  - Total: 166
- Time zone: UTC+1 (CET)
  - Summer (DST): UTC+2 (CEST)

Kusa Vrana is a village in the municipality of Dimitrovgrad, Serbia. According to the 2002 census, the village has a population of 166 people.
