= Tsvyatko Radoinov =

Bulgarian communist activist and military commander (1895–1942)

- Цвятко Радойнов
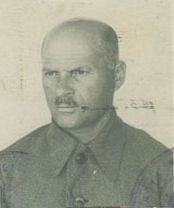
- Born: 10 February 1895; Kran, Stara Zagora Province, Principality of Bulgaria
- Died: 26 June 1942 (aged 47); Sofia, Kingdom of Bulgaria
- Military career
- Allegiance: Kingdom of Bulgaria; Soviet Union
- Branch: Red Army; International Brigades
- Service years: 1926–1942
- Rank: Colonel
- Commands: Central Military Commission of the BCP
- Conflicts: World War I; Spanish Civil War; Second World War

Tsvyatko Kolev Radoinov (Bulgarian: Цвятко Колев Радойнов; 10 February 1895 – 26 June 1942) was a Bulgarian communist activist and military commander who was a leading member of the Bulgarian resistance movement during World War II.

== Biography ==
Born in to a poor peasant family, Radoinov joined the Bulgarian Social Democratic Workers' Party (Narrow Socialists) while he was still a student. In 1914, after graduating from the Kazanlak Pedagogical College, Tsvyatko was drafted into the army, where he conducted anti-war propaganda. After the war he began working as a rural taught but was soon dismissed for his communist activities.

Radoinov who participated in the September Uprising fled to the Soviet Union through Turkey and was sentenced to death in absentia. During his early residence in the USSR, Radoinov worked in an agricultural commune (later collective farm) names after Dimitar Blagoev in Poltava. In 1926, Radoinov the Frunze Military Academy, which he graduated from in 1929. He enlisted in the Red Army and became a teacher at the academy. During the Spanish Civil War, Radoinov held the position of military adviser to the Republican Army. As part of the International Brigades, he took part in the defense of Madrid and the Battle of Guadalajara.

By decision of the Foreign Bureau of the Central Committee of the Bulgarian Communist Party, Radoinov was sent to Bulgaria to organize a partisan resistance movement. He alongside other Bulgarian communist émigrés reached Bulgaria with a Soviet submarine. In the same year, Radoinov became a member of the Central Committee of the BCP and headed the Central Military Commission under the Central Committee of the Bulgarian Workers' Party (BWP, the legal wing of the BCP). In April 1942, Radoinov was arrested after his whereabouts were exposed by Nikola Geshev's agents in the party. He was tried alongside 27 other Bulgarian communists, who had been sent to Bulgaria with the help of Soviet intelligence in the so-called "Trial of the Parachutists and Submariners". On 25 June Radoinov, along with 18 out of 27 defendants, was sentenced to death; the following day, the convicted were shot at the shooting range of the Reserve Officers' School in Sofia.
