= People's Liberation Insurgent Army =

Bulgarian partisan resistance organization during WWII

The People's Liberation Insurgent Army (NOVA; Bulgarian: Народоосвободителната въстаническа армия, НОВА) was the partisan resistance organization of the communist movement in Bulgaria during the Second World War from March 1943 to 9 September 1944. It was the largest resistance organization of Bulgaria during the Second World War.

== Background and structure ==
The partisan movement in Bulgaria appeared in the second half of 1941 and consisted of multiple separate partisan detachments.

Political leadership the partisan detachments was exercised by the Politburo of the Bulgarian Communist Party. It was operationally managed by the Central Military Commission of the BCP with Commander Tsvyatko Radoinov and members Hristo Mihailov, Boyan Balgaranov, Petar Mihailov, Gocho Grozev, Georgi Minchev, Ivan Maslarov, Dimo Dichev. Among the collaborators were Anton Ivanov, Anton Yugov, Petar Bogdanov, Nikola Vaptsarov, Anton Popov, Atanas Romanov.

The victory of the Soviet troops at Stalingrad aroused great enthusiasm among the leaders and participants of the partisan movement. In March 1943, it was decided to create a People's Liberation Insurrectionary Army on the basis of partisan detachments. The aim was to create a unified command and better coordination of the actions of the increased number of guerrilla units after the Battle of Stalingrad on the instructions of the GRU of the Red Army.

In April 1943, the Central Military Commission was reorganized into the General Staff of the People's Liberation Insurgent Army, and the territory of Bulgaria was divided into 12 partisan operational zones. The leadership of each operational zone included a commander, his deputy, a chief of staff, and a political commissar.

In the summer of 1944, the People's Liberation Insurgent Army included 9 partisan brigades, 35 battalions and detachments, 2 couples and several small combat groups. As of early September 1944, the People's Liberation Insurgent Army included 1 partisan division, 9 partisan brigades and 37 partisan detachments and combat groups.

The partisan forces numbered up to 9,900 during the heyday of the movement. According to some researchers, after the Communists and their allies seized power, the number of living guerrillas was 5,654, to which should be added 1,988 members of battle groups and 12,252 fugitives. Account should also be taken of the losses of NOVA, who were 3,055 killed in battle, executed, died of wounds and imprisoned in 1941–1944. As well as the killed partisans, members of battle groups and fugitives, participants in the war against Nazi Germany until 9 May 1945.

== General staff ==
NOVA was officially headed by the General Staff, a successor to the Bulgarian Communist Party's Central Military Commission, which existed until 1943. The General Staff had limited resources and is dependent on BCP networks. For example, its contacts with the individual Insurgent Operational Zones were carried out through the communication channels established by the party.

In its first composition, the General Assembly consists of:

- Commander of the Staff - Hristo Mihailov (died on 8 February 1944),
- Political Commissioner - Emil Markov (replaced after his death on 12 July 1943, by Dobri Terpeshev),
- members - Anton Yugov, Petar Vranchev, Lev Glavinchev and Todor Toshev.

From February 1944 the composition was:

- Commander of the Staff - Dobri Terpeshev,
- members - Anton Yugov, Boyan Bulgaranov, Vlado Trichkov, Petar Iliev, Todor Toshev, Petar Vranchev, Blagoy Ivanov (July).

== Operations and disbandment ==
Following their existing operations against the partisans, the regular police started engaging NOVA in the summer of 1943. The army took the initiative during the winter of 1943-1944 only to be joined by the police again in the spring of 1944. Starting in the summer of 1944 all three armed forces - police, army and gendermerie - were actively engaged in operations against NOVA.

Despite their inferior numbers, the NOVA troops benefited from the BCP support network within the civilian population and skillfully waged a guerilla war: they temporarily held captured small villages, attacked farms for supplies, organized sabotage in factories and assassinated prominent government officials. In the west of the country, the Bulgarians were helped by the People's Liberation Army of Yugoslavia, and in the south by the Greek People's Liberation Army.

In the winter of 1943–1944, the government mobilized up to one hundred thousand soldiers and police in an attempt to deliver a decisive blow to NOVA but those actions had only limited success. In the spring of 1944, the number of NOVA increased even more. In August 1944, in anticipation of the arrival of the Red Army, NOVA began to prepare for an attack on Sofia and other major cities in the country. At the time of the 1944 Bulgarian coup d'état on 9 September 1944, NOVA had 9 mortars, 440 machine guns, 850 assault rifles, 7660 rifles and 3180 pistols and revolvers in service.

On 8 September, Communists and their supporters carried out a coup d'état. Power passed into the hands of the Fatherland Front, headed by Kimon Georgiev. The leaders of the NOVA took their places in the newly formed government.

On 10 September 1944, the government of the Fatherland Front announced the disbandment of the police, gendarmerie, the dissolution of fascist organizations and the creation of a people's militia.

Also, it was announced the creation of the Bulgarian People's Army, which included fighters of the NOVA partisan detachments and combat groups of the BCP, activists of the Resistance movement and 40 thousand volunteers.

On 22 September 1944, the NOVA detachment commanders received the status of assistant commanders of the Bulgarian People's Army.
