= Nikola Geshev =

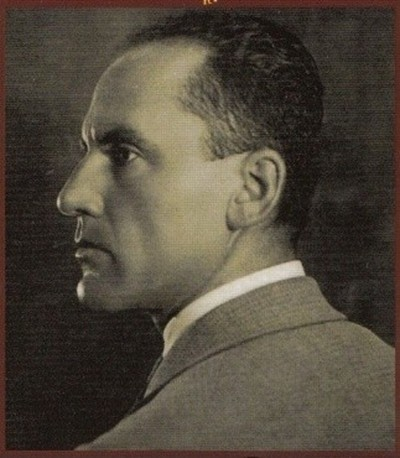
- Born: April 13, 1896; Sofia, Bulgaria
- Died: Unknown (probably September 1944)

Nikola Hristov Geshev (Bulgarian: Никола Христов Гешев) (13 April 1896 – 1944 probably) was a famous Bulgarian policeman between the two World Wars. A native of Sofia, Geshev had fought in the First World War.

As a youngster he became interested in Marxism for a short time. After the end of the war he traveled to Fascist Italy where he was impressed by Benito Mussolini and the fascist state. When he returned to Bulgaria he started to work in the Police. He reached his peak in the end of the 1930s, when he became commander of second department of the Bulgarian Secret Police. He was known as a "super policeman" and was a strong enemy of the Bulgarian Communist Party. In 1942 Geshev succeeded in breaking the Central Committee of the Communist Party. Furthermore, he introduced his own agents inside the Bulgarian Communist Party. Some sources prove that even the communist leader of Bulgaria Todor Zhivkov was an agent of Geshev. The same goes for many other communist politicians. After the Soviets took over Bulgaria, Geshev's destiny is unknown. There are many theories, but the most common of them say that either he was killed near Plovdiv by partisans or he fled to Turkey and then to West Germany. Less common versions of his destiny made him working for the CIA or for the KGB. During the Cold War some of the communist leaders of Bulgaria were afraid that if Geshev became an agent of the KGB he could show his records.

Some Bulgarian writers have written that Geshev lived until 1984 in a ranch near Munich, West Germany.
