= Bulgarian resistance movement during World War II =

Combatant organizations opposed to Nazi Germany

Bulgarian Resistance
- Part of Resistance during World War II
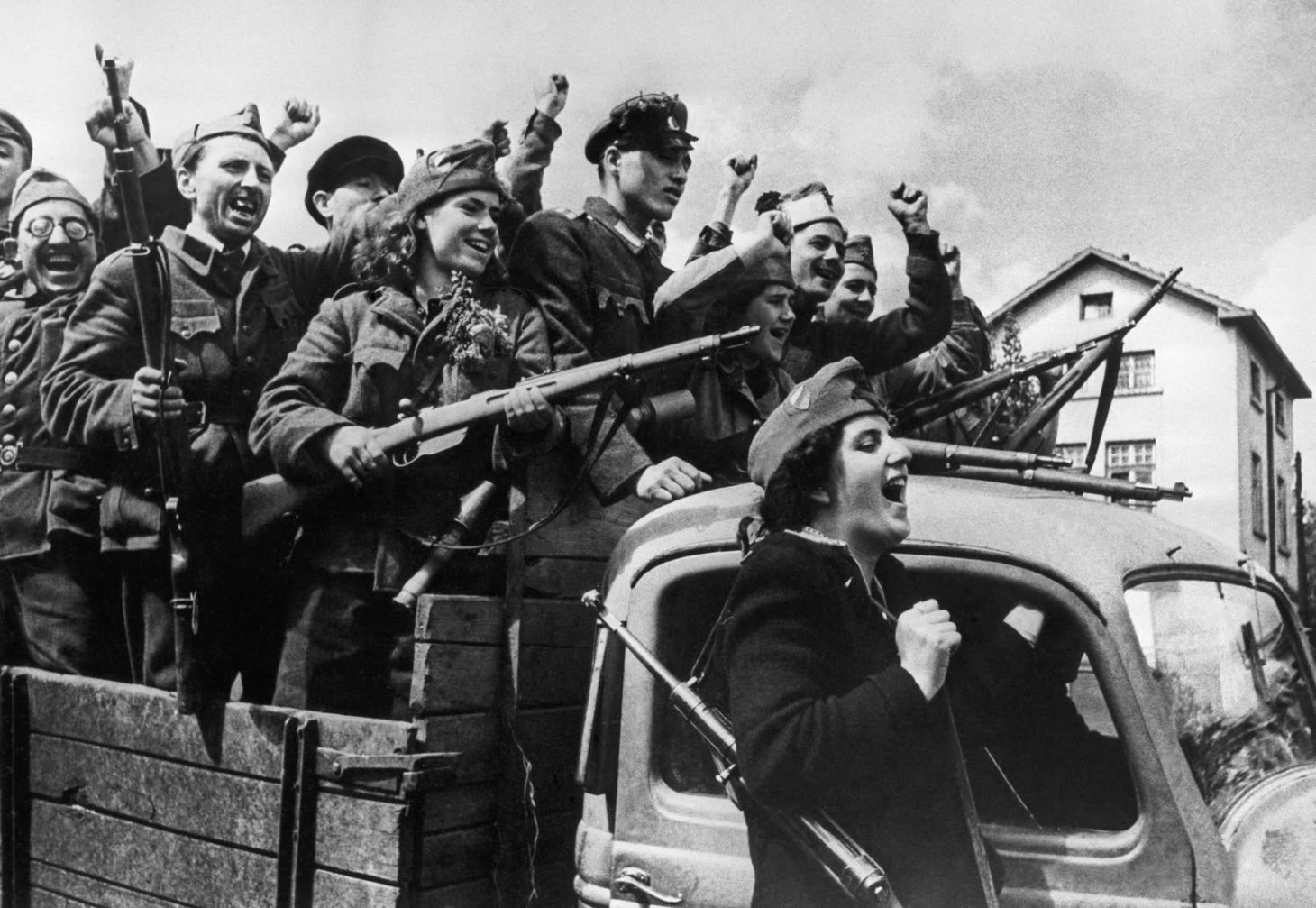
- Bulgarian partisans enter Sofia, 9 September 1944
Date	August 1941 – September 1944
Location	Bulgaria
Result	Victory of the Resistance: Overthrow of the pro-Axis government; Bulgaria switches sides in World War II from the Axis to the Allies; Soviet invasion of Bulgaria and establishment of the People's Republic of Bulgaria

Belligerents
Fatherland Front; Supported by: Soviet Union	Tsardom of Bulgaria; (Nazi Germany) Germany

Units involved
Guerrilla units (until April 1943); NOVA (since April 1943); Combat groups	(Bulgaria) Police; (Bulgaria) Gendarmerie; (Bulgaria) Bulgarian Army; (Nazi Germany) Wehrmacht

Casualties and losses
3,055 killed, executed and died in imprisonment	Unknown

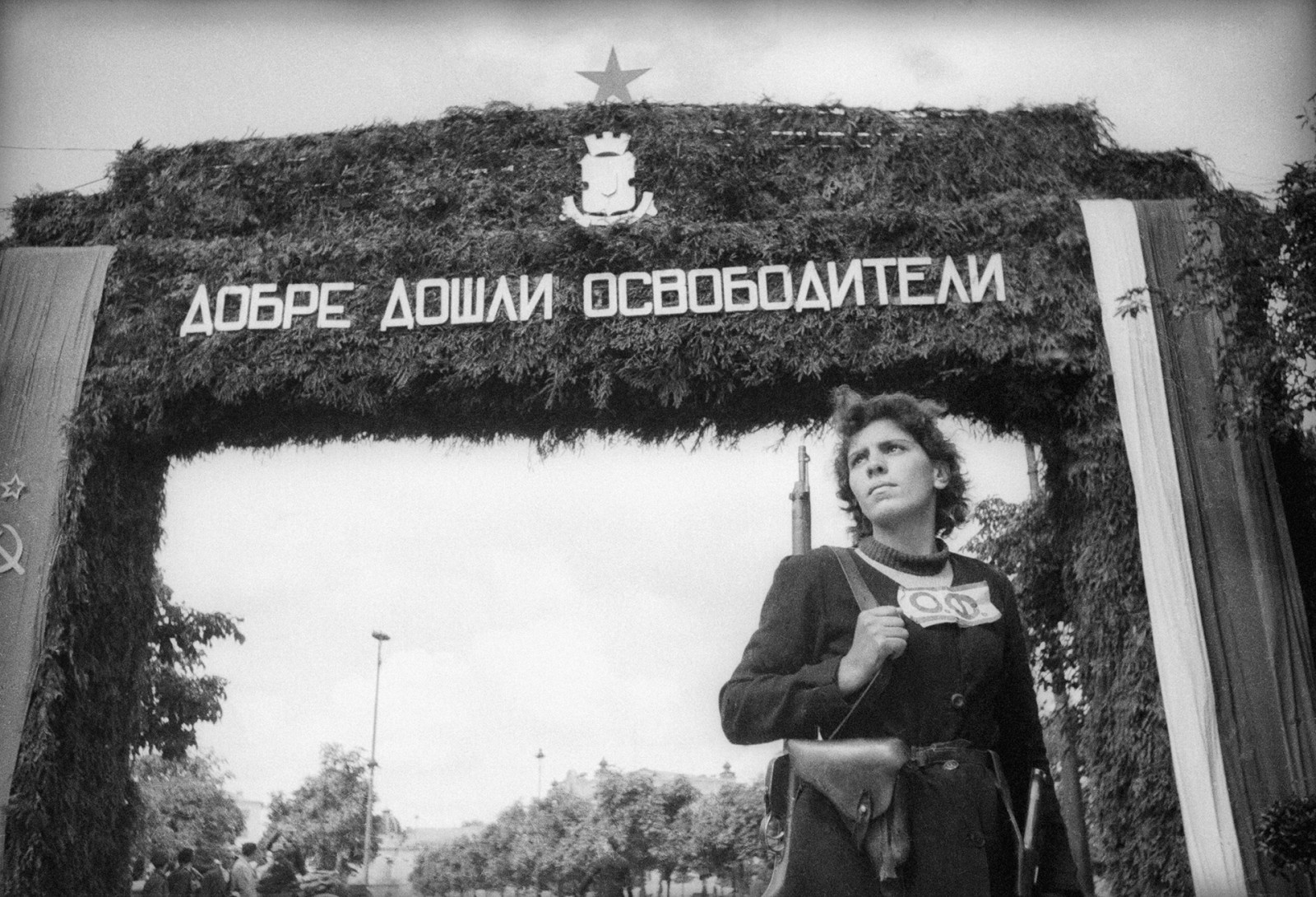
Bulgarian partisan at a triumphal arch, 1944

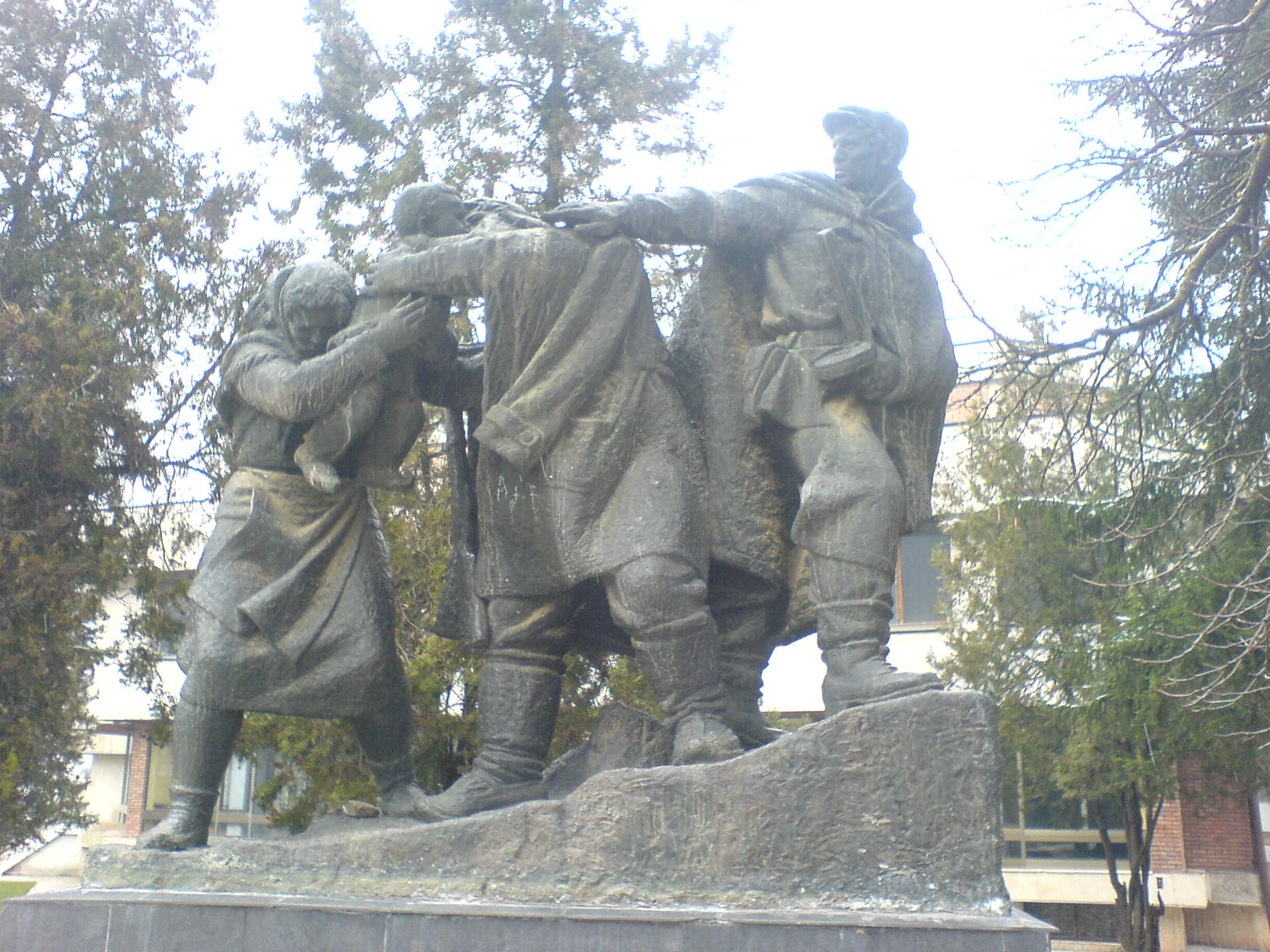
Monument to the Bulgarian partisans in Tran, Bulgaria

The Bulgarian Resistance (Bulgarian: Партизанско движение в България, romanized: Partizansko dvizhenie v Balgariya, lit. 'Partisan movement in Bulgaria') was part of the anti-Axis resistance during World War II. It consisted of armed and unarmed actions of resistance groups against the Wehrmacht forces in Bulgaria and the Tsardom of Bulgaria authorities. It was mainly communist and pro-Soviet Union. Participants in the armed resistance were called partizanin (a partisan) and yatak (a helper, or a supporter, someone who provides cover for someone else).

== Background ==
The Communists had long despised the pro-German policy of Prime Minister Bogdan Filov and even campaigned in 1940 for a political pact with Moscow (the Sobolev action).

German forces entered Bulgaria on 1–2 March 1941 as a result of Bulgaria's adhesion to the Axis. The Bulgarian Communist Party (BCP) declared this to be a "fatal move" and once again called for a union with the USSR.

On 6 March 1941 Georgi Dimitrov called on the people of Bulgaria to start resistance against the Germans.

Before the German invasion of the USSR, there had not been any armed resistance in Bulgaria. At the start of World War II, the Comintern supported a policy of non-intervention, arguing that the war was an imperialist war between various national ruling classes, but when the Soviet Union itself was invaded on 22 June 1941, the Comintern changed its position. The resistance movement was set up in August 1941 by the Bulgarian Communist Party to oppose the pro-Nazi government.

== Beginning ==
The German attack on the Soviet Union on 22 June 1941 sparked the rage of Communists and Russophiles in Bulgaria. The same day the BCP spread a brochure among the people urging them "to hinder by all means the usage of Bulgarian land and soldiers for the criminal purposes of German fascism". Two days later, on 24 June, the BCP called for an armed resistance against the Wehrmacht and the Bogdan Filov government.

On 23 July 1941 an illegal radio station — "Hristo Botev" ("Христо Ботев") — began broadcasting.

In the first year of the resistance the BCP used mainly its Combat groups. They carried out a number of actions, including arson and demolition of arms, clothes and fuel warehouses, communications, factories and transport lines. The combat groups assassinated prominent Bulgarian politicians, army and police leaders, and Wehrmacht officers. The combat groups' activities impaired the image of Hitler's supporters in Bulgaria but a great number of their members were captured or killed.

The first known partisan in Bulgaria was Ivan Kozarev.

The first guerrilla group (cheta) was created on 26 June 1941 near Razlog, the first partisan commander was Nikola Parapunov. The second group was created in August 1941. Other guerrilla detachments were created in the late summer and autumn of 1941.

The first guerrilla detachments were relatively small. They were created in the Pirin, Rhodopes and Sredna gora mountains.

In September 1941, Bulgarian communist émigrés under the command of Tsvyatko Radoinov and Hristo Mihaylov arrived on Soviet submarines and aircraft to boost the resistance movement. 55 experienced communist fighters were sent by the Foreign Bureau of the BCP, according to one version. According to another version, they were sent by order of the NKVD, of which the Bulgarian Communists in Moscow were not aware. The landing of the so-called "paratroopers" and "submariners" turned out to be precipitate and most of them were captured or killed. On the other hand, those who survived became some of the most prominent partisan leaders.

On October 7, 1941, a second illegal radio station — "Naroden glas" ("Народен глас") — began broadcasting.

Also, activists of the Resistance produced and distributed several illegal newspapers ("Работническо дело", "Народен другар", "Народен глас", "Истина", "Народен партизанин", "Партизанска борба", "Отечествен фронт") and leaflets.

== Rise of the partisan force ==
In the winter of 1941-1942 the Wehrmacht suffered a major defeat at the Battle of Moscow. This destroyed the myth of the invincibility of the German army, and showed that the blitzkrieg in the Soviet Union had failed. In April 1942, a map titled "The Danube area" was published in Germany, where the so-called "new annexed territories" of Bulgaria in Macedonia and Thrace were described as "territories under temporary Bulgarian administration". This was a failure for Sofia's official propaganda, which claimed to have completed the national unification of the Bulgarians. These events led to a rise in the partisans' manpower and prestige.

In July 1942, Georgi Dimitrov announced the creation of the Fatherland Front (FF), on the underground radio station "Hristo Botev". It was a major anti-fascist coalition between the Communists, the Agrarians and the "Zveno" party. The FF demanded the non-participation of Bulgarian forces in the war against the USSR, the immediate return of Bulgarian occupation forces from Greek and Yugoslav territory, the repudiation of the union with Germany, a halt of the export of grain to Nazi Germany, friendly relations with the USSR, the United Kingdom and the United States, the restoration of civil freedoms, denunciation of non-constitutional laws, cessation of military actions against civil population, dismissal of all pro-fascist organizations and eradication of racial hatred. Despite the arrest and later execution of most of the Central Committee of the BCP (through betrayal by one of its members), the strength of the partisans continued to grow. In August 1943 the Bulgarian Social Democratic Workers Party joined the FF. The FF also was supplied by the Soviet armed forces and mainly contributed with various arm shipments and artillery pieces. Some of these would later end up in the hands of the opposing side but also in the hands of the Yugoslav Partisans active in Macedonia and southern Serbia.

== Fierce fighting ==
Due to the growing number and manpower of combat groups and partisan detachments, in April 1943 they were organized into the People's Liberation Insurgent Army (Narodoosvoboditelna vastannicheska armija, NOVA). NOVA divided Bulgaria into 12 Rebel Operative Zones which implied BWP's intention of seizing power. The Bulgarian authorities responded by intensifying the persecution of resistance members. Thousands of opposition activists were killed, imprisoned or interned. The government created a special gendarmerie force which received almost unlimited power to pursue the partisans. The gendarmes became notorious for carrying out atrocities against captured partisans and their yatatsi. Gendarmerie and the police also became increasingly involved in harassment, arson and murders of partisans' families. Partisans staged attacks on railroads and warehouses, used by the German or the Bulgarian forces. When it was possible, they captured villages to organize meetings in support of the FF, destroy police and tax archives and supply themselves with food and arms.

BCP increased its activity among Bulgarian soldiers. A frequent result was the army's low effectiveness in fighting partisan detachments. A significant number of soldiers deserted to join the partisans. Such events were mainly observed in the Bulgarian forces in Yugoslavia and Greece. Seven partisan detachments were created from former army battalions which sided with the partisans. The most prominent soldier-partisan commanders were Ditcho Petrov and Atanas Rusev.

In the spring of 1944, the Bulgarian government decided to crush the partisans and mobilised about 100,000 soldiers, policemen and gendarmes, which were thrown into mass actions against the guerrillas. The result was the opposite of that desired. As the Red Army advanced towards the Balkans, even more people joined the resistance. NOVA grew as a significant military force. In the Tran, Rhodopes and Sredna Gora regions, the partisans were a constant threat to the government.

== Takeover of the government ==
On 2 September 1944, the pro-German government of Ivan Bagryanov stepped down in response to the Red Army's advance towards Bulgaria. A pro-Western government of the former legal opposition came to power. It ordered the army not to resist Soviet forces, demanded that the Wehrmacht leave, repudiated the union with Germany and started negotiations with NOVA commander Dobri Terpeshev. The right wing Agrarians, who controlled the government, offered the FF some ministerial positions. In the meantime, the police and the army continued to pursue the partisans, unchecked by civil authority. Advancing Soviet troops gave the Communists self-confidence and they rejected the Agrarians' offer.

Between 6 and 9 September 1944, 170 Bulgarian towns and villages were captured by the partisans. On 9 September, Terpeshev ordered all partisans to descend from the mountains and seize power in all of Bulgaria - '"All brigades, battalions and cheti of the people's liberation army are to capture the villages and towns and install FF committees in them"'. In Sofia, "Zveno" mobilised its influence in the military and so some strong army detachments, including the Tank brigade, sided with the FF and staged a coup on the night of 8/9 September.

Soon after FF's seizure of power, the partisans became the first forces to resist the attempted return of the Wehrmacht in Bulgaria on its western and northwestern border. Bulgarian partisans also participated in the liberation from Nazi occupation of some towns and villages in Yugoslavia and Greece. After 9 September and prior to Bulgaria's army joining the Allies' fight against the Axis, former partisans were placed in key positions in the Bulgarian military to ensure its loyalty. Former partisans also built up the new People's Militia, which replaced the Bulgarian police. They allegedly participated in mass retaliation which took the lives of thousands of former civil servants, policemen and gendarmes.

== Strength of partisan forces ==
The ultimate number of partisans according to the official historiography of People's Republic of Bulgaria was around 30,000. However, researchers after the transition to democracy point to a figure of around 9,900.

In addition, there were foreign members of the Bulgarian resistance movement during World War II - 68 Soviet citizens and ex-soldiers (former prisoners of war, who escaped from Nazi concentration camps), several Russian white émigrés (former participants in the White movement), several Serbs and 1 Czech communist.

At the beginning of September 1944, the NOVA partisan units comprised one partisan division, 9 partisan brigades, 37 partisan detachments and several combat groups (cheti).

In the clashes with government and German forces and as a result of torture and executions 2,740 people died between 1941 and 1944.

== Bulgarian citizens in anti-fascist resistance in foreign countries ==
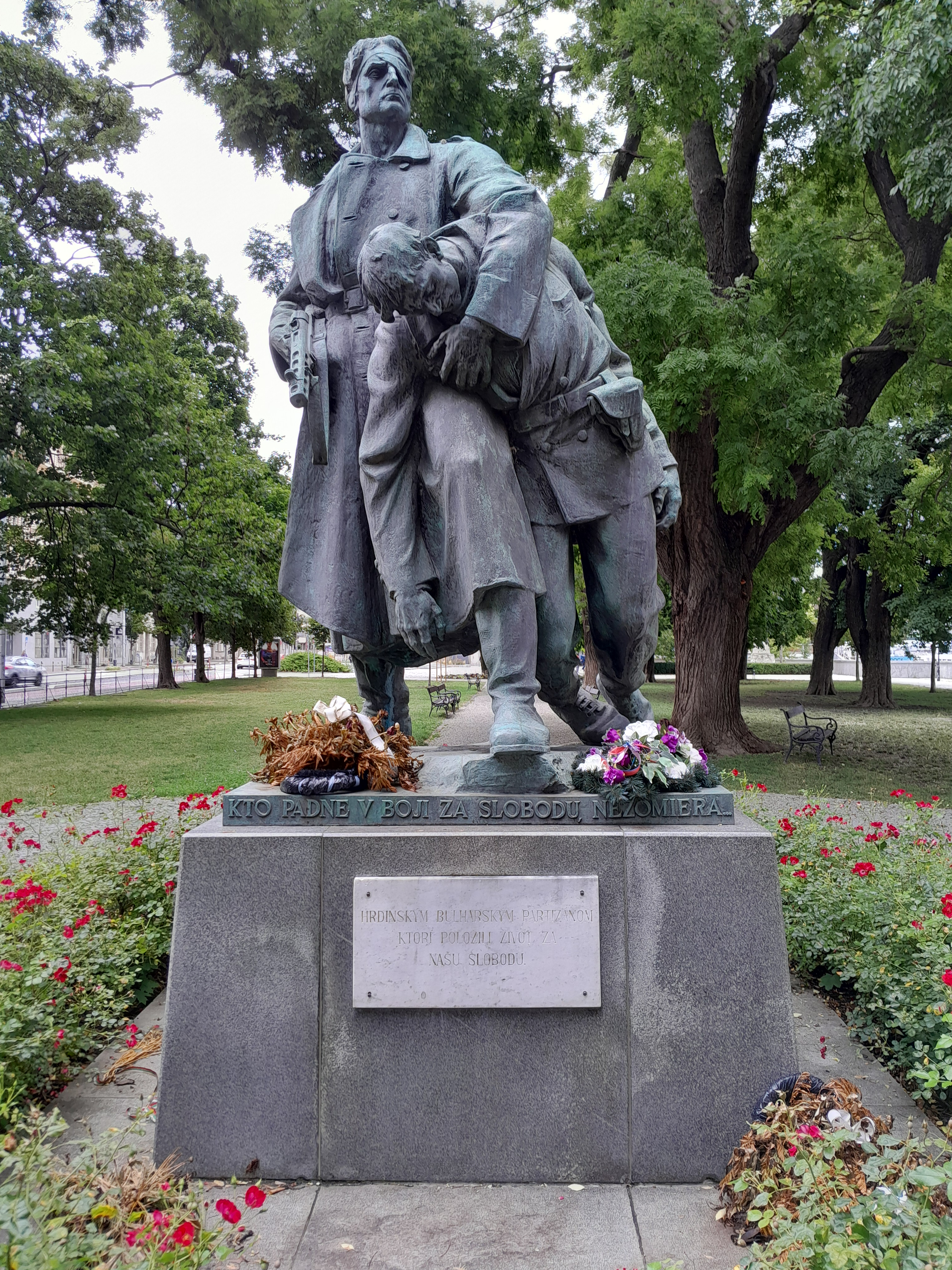
Memorial of the Bulgarian Partisans in Bratislava, Slovakia

During World War II, Bulgarians took part in the resistance movement in other countries.

Bulgarians took part in the Soviet partisan movement:

- Liliya Karastoyanova (Лилия Карастоянова) fought in Chernigov partisan unit of A.F. Fedorov. In January 1943, in Gomel Region she was killed in battle with German troops. For heroism and courage in battle, she was awarded the Order of the Patriotic War (posthumously).
- Asen Draganov fought in the partisan unit of D.N. Medvedev. 30 November 1943 he was killed in engagement with German troops. He was awarded the Order of the Red Star.
- Vera Pavlova was a field medic in the partisan unit of D.N. Medvedev. During the service in this partisan unit she fought in 33 battles and performed 800 medical operations. 29 June 1944 she was awarded the Medal "Partisan of the Patriotic War" 1st class

50 Bulgarians took part in the partisan movement in Czechoslovakia, including taking part in the Slovak National Uprising. Bulgarian I. Popovich was a member of the BSV resistance organization in München.

Bulgarian communist Todor Angelov took part in the Belgian Resistance movement. In early 1943, he was arrested and interned in the Fort Breendonk concentration camp, where he was executed in late November 1943.

In addition, 223 Bulgarians (citizens of Bulgaria and Bulgarian emigrants, who had become citizens of the USSR), fought against Axis troops in the Soviet Army. Some 151 of them were killed in action.

== See also ==
- Bulgarian rule of Macedonia, Morava Valley and Western Thrace (1941–1944)
