= Bulgarian rule of Macedonia, Morava Valley and Western Thrace (1941–1944) =

Bulgaria and the lands under Bulgarian rule during World War II
- Part of World War II
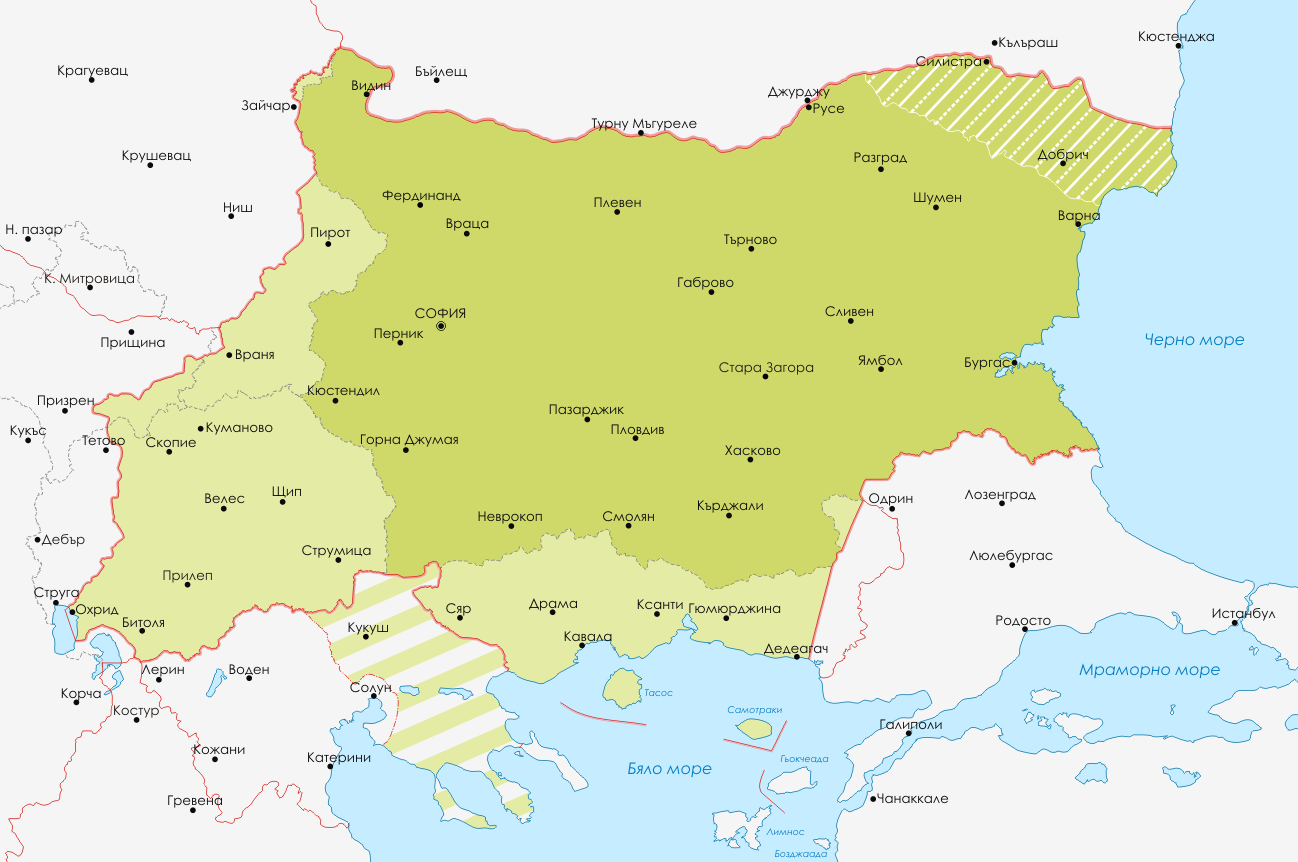
- Bulgaria and the lands under Bulgarian rule during World War II
- Type: Military occupation
- Locations: Part of Vardar Banovina and Morava Banovina, Yugoslavia; Bulgarian occupation of Northern Greece
- Planned by: Kingdom of Bulgaria
- Commanded by: Nikola Mihov; Ivan Markov; Vasil Boydev; Bogdan Filov
- Target: Yugoslavia and Greece
- Date: 19 April 1941–26 October 1944 (3 years, 6 months and 1 week)
- Executed by: Fifth Army; Second Army
- Outcome: Most of Vardar Macedonia and parts of Eastern Serbia and Northern Greece annexed by Bulgaria, The Holocaust in North Macedonia and Greece

During Bulgaria's participation in World War II as a member of the Tripartite Pact (1941–1944), the Kingdom of Bulgaria unilaterally annexed several Yugoslav and Greek territories, including most of Macedonia, the Morava Valley, and Western Thrace. As a result of these annexations, Bulgaria acquired a total of 39,756.6 km^{2}, distributed as follows: the Western Outlands (2,968 km^{2}), Macedonia (23,807 km^{2}), Western Thrace (12,363 km^{2}), the island of Thasos (443 km^{2}), and the island of Samothrace (184 km^{2}). This brought the total area of the Bulgarian state to 150,668.1 km^{2}.

== 1941 ==
=== Occupation of Vardar Macedonia ===
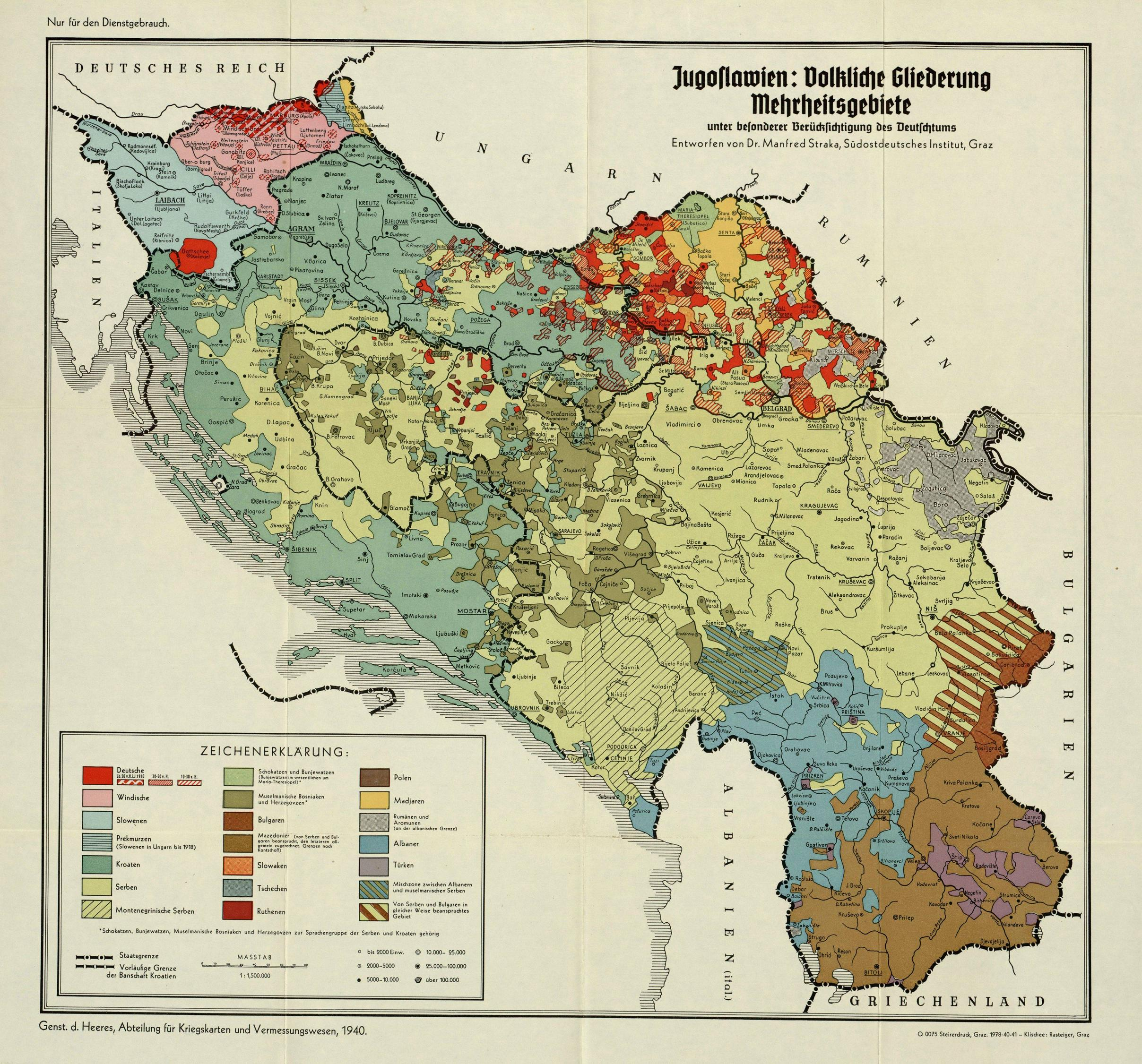
German ethnographic map of Yugoslavia from 1940. Macedonians are shown as a separate community, claimed by Bulgarians and Serbs, but it is stated that they were generally counted among the Bulgarians. The Western Outlands are marked as inhabited by Bulgarians, and Morava Valley as a mixed area inhabited by Serbs and Bulgarians.

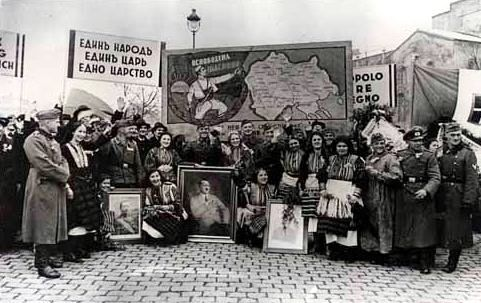
Macedonian Bulgarians in Sofia pose with German soldiers during the Axis operation against Yugoslavia in April 1941. The inscription on the poster praises Independent Macedonia and the unification of Bulgaria and Macedonia. The Germans were greeted with the same posters in Skopje.

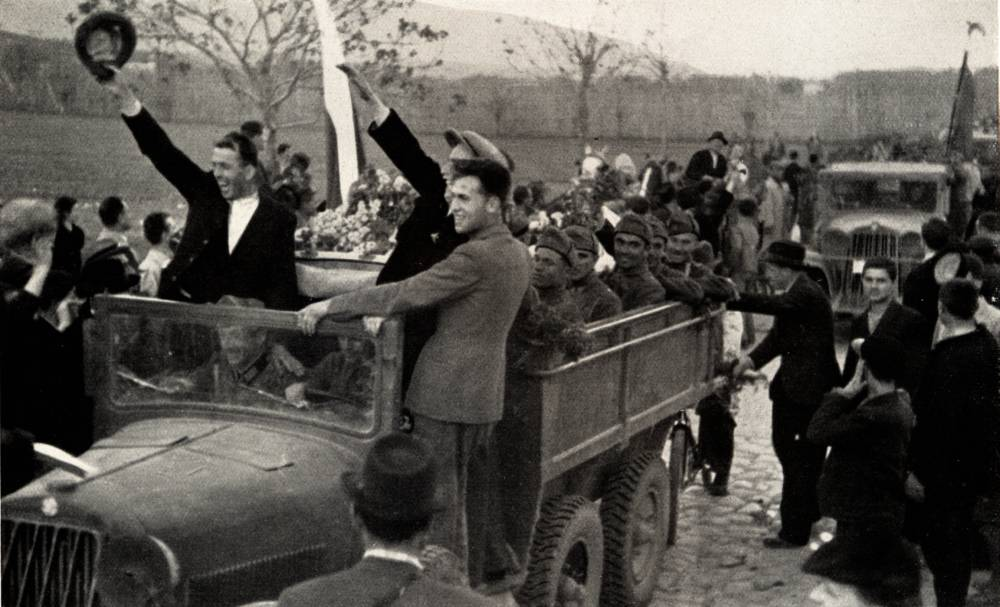
Entry of Bulgarian troops into Vardar Macedonia in April 1941.

Between 6 and 17 April 1941, the German Empire and the Kingdom of Italy launched a coordinated invasion and occupation of the Kingdom of Yugoslavia. As early as 8 April, former Internal Macedonian Revolutionary Organization (VMRO) activists were considering a declaration of an Independent Macedonia under German protection, meeting in Galichki Han in Skopje.

On 9 April, Stefan Stefanov and Vasil Hadzhikimov arrived from Sofia and began organizing the Bulgarian Central Action Committee, which was officially established on 13 April. A 32-member committee appointed Spiro Kitinchev as mayor of Skopje, removed the Serbian metropolitan bishop Joseph from the city, and initiated Bulgarian-language broadcasts on Radio Skopje.

On 19 April, the Fifth Bulgarian Army entered the region in accordance with the Provisional Directives for the Partition of Yugoslavia issued on 3 April. The Fifth Army Region, which included the 15th and 17th Infantry Divisions along with additional units, was established. General Nikola Mihov was appointed head of the army region. By 1943, the number of Bulgarian military personnel in the area had risen from 22,000 to 32,000, with many units composed primarily of Macedonian Bulgarians from the region.

On 1 October 1941, a military court was established in Skopje. Separate regional courts were also set up in Bitola, Prilep, Strumica, and Veles, while district courts were established in other towns.

=== Conquest of Morava Valley ===
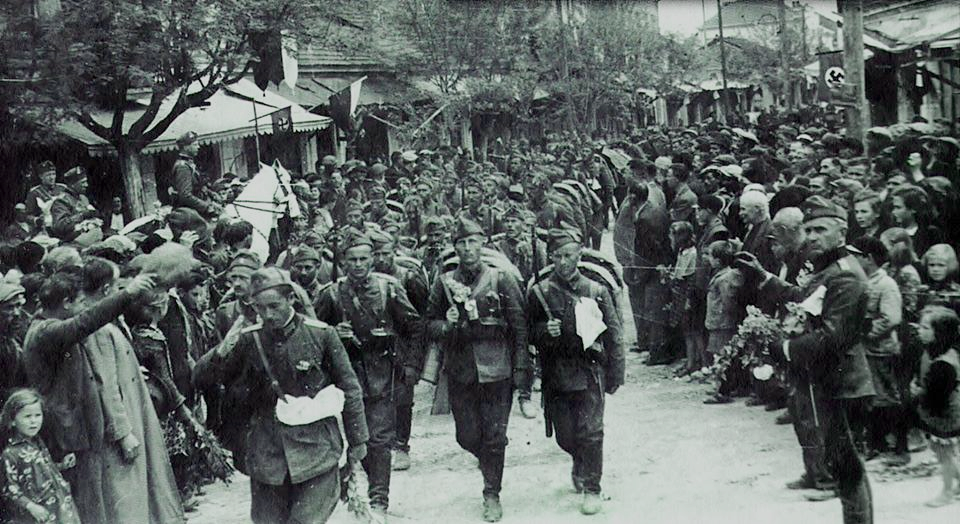
Bulgarian troops welcomed in Strumica, April 1941.

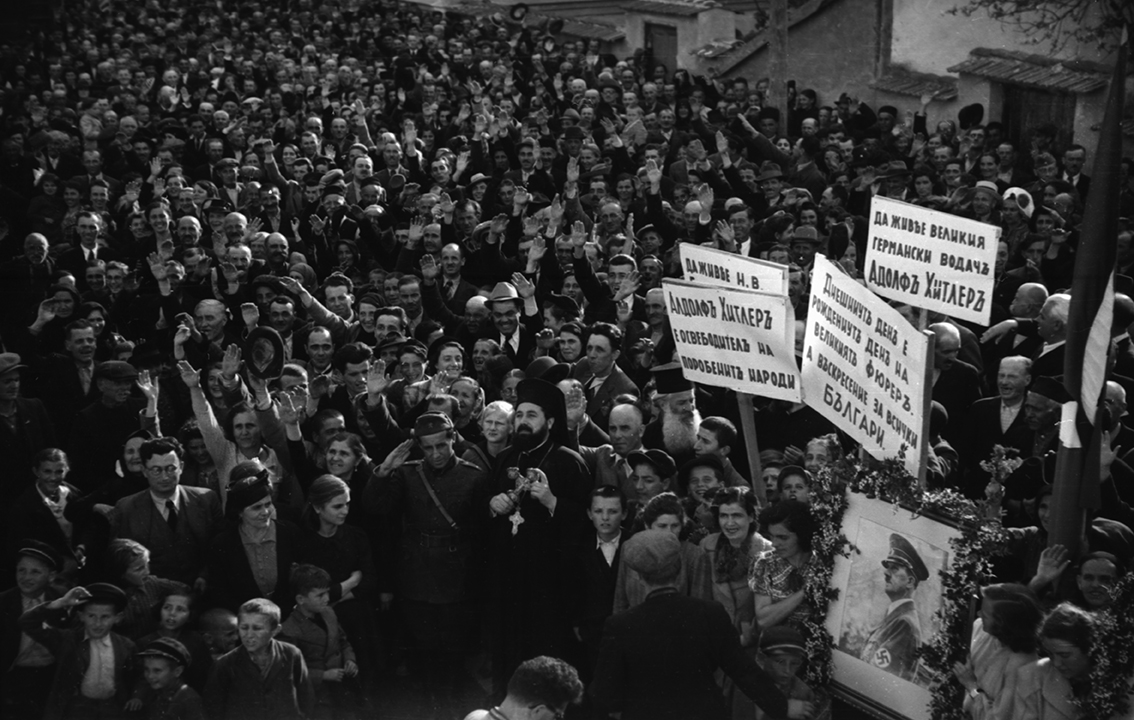
Crowd in Yugoslav Macedonia praising the resurrection of the Bulgarian people and the birthday of Adolf Hitler, 20 April 1941.

On 19 April 1941, Bulgarian forces entered Yugoslav territory, annexing the Western Outlands and the Morava Valley along the western border with Serbia, in line with Bulgaria's territorial claims under the Treaty of San Stefano. In addition to the directly annexed regions of Pirot and Vranje, the German authorities later requested that Bulgaria deploy troops deeper into the interior of Serbia.

As a result, on 7 January 1942, Bulgarian troops advanced into the region of Šumadija. The occupied zone extended west of the Bulgarian border and included the area north of the Gollak Mountains, east of the Ibar River, and encompassed key towns such as Kraljevo and Kragujevac, along with the territory south of the town of Lapovo.

In July 1943, the Bulgarian occupation zone was significantly expanded, reaching the approaches to Belgrade.

=== Capture of the Belomorie ===
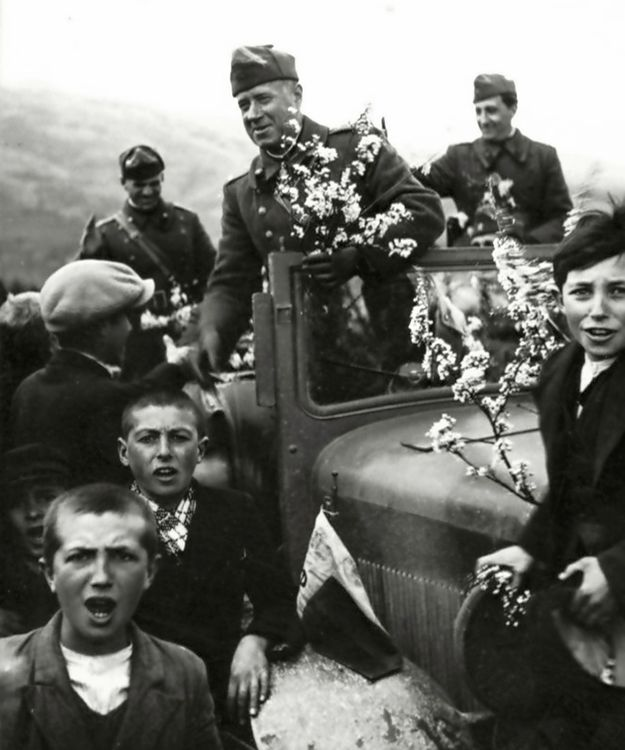
Bulgarian troops welcomed in the Western Outlands in April 1941.

On 6 April 1941, Germany launched an offensive against Greece, which was defeated and fully occupied by 30 April. On 13 April, Adolf Hitler issued Directive No. 27, outlining plans for the future occupation of Greek territory. On 20 April 1941, the Second Bulgarian Army entered the Greek Aegean region, advancing into Eastern Aegean Macedonia and Western Thrace. It occupied nearly the entire area between the Struma and Maritsa rivers, with the exception of a narrow demilitarized zone along the Turkish border west of the Maritsa. This zone remained under German control and was reserved for possible transfer to Turkey, should it decide to join the Axis powers.

To the west of the Struma River, including the strategically important city of Thessaloniki, German occupation forces were established. German troops also entered the city of Lerin (Florina), although its control was contested between Fascist Italy and Bulgaria.

Following Italy's withdrawal from the war, the 7th Rila Infantry Division was ordered to occupy the Thessaloniki region. On 5 July 1943, it assumed responsibility for organizing the defense of the White Sea (Aegean Sea) coast, covering the area from the Epanomi lighthouse (on the Chalkidiki Peninsula, approximately 25 km south of Thessaloniki) to the mouth of the Struma River. As a result, Bulgarian forces occupied the central parts of Aegean Macedonia, including the Thessaloniki region—though not the city itself or the Chalkidiki Peninsula.

The regional civil governors of the Belomorie region under the Kingdom of Bulgaria were:

- Iliya Kozhuharov (12 May 1941 – 20 October 1941)
- Retired General M.A. Hristo Gerdzhikov (20 October 1941 – c. 20 January 1942)
- Dr. Stefan Klechkov (c. 20 January 1942 – 18 September 1944)

=== Treaties and agreements ===
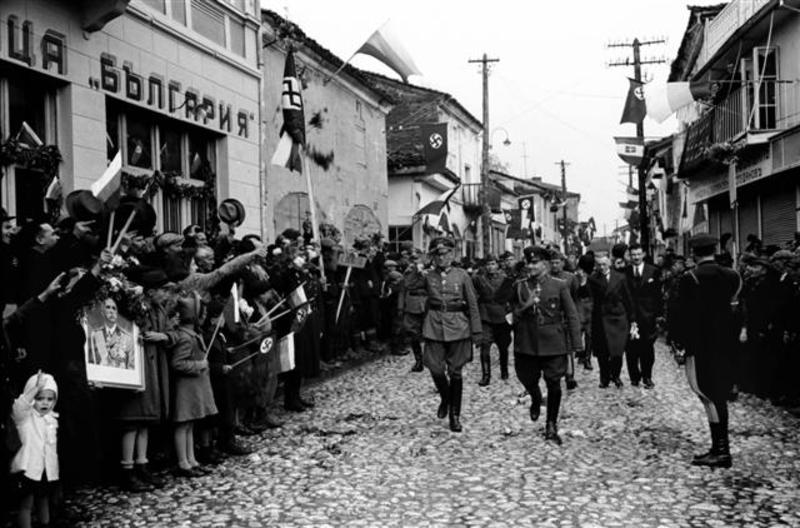
The surrender of Ohrid by the Italians under Bulgarian administration with the mediation of the Germans in May 1941.

Between 21 and 22 April 1941, a conference was held in Vienna between German Foreign Minister Joachim von Ribbentrop and Italian Foreign Minister Count Galeazzo Ciano. The meeting determined the demarcation line between Bulgaria and the Italian protectorate of Albania. The Italian occupation zone included the cities of Tetovo, Gostivar, Struga, Debar and Kichevo—a total of 4,314 km² with a population of approximately 232,000. Bulgaria, in turn, was granted control over Ohrid and Resen.

On 10 July 1941, a dispute arose between Bulgaria and Italy over a mine near Ljuboten. After German mediation, control of the mine was awarded to Bulgaria. Subsequently, on 12 August 1941, the demarcation line between Bulgaria and Albania was slightly modified, resulting in Bulgaria gaining control of the village of Peštani.

On 24 April 1941, Bulgaria and Germany secretly signed the Clodius–Popov Agreement, which granted Germany unrestricted rights to exploit natural resources in the newly occupied territories. Under the agreement, Bulgaria undertook responsibility for financing German military infrastructure, paying Yugoslavia's outstanding debts to Germany, and administering the annexed regions. However, the agreement also imposed significant restrictions on Bulgarian sovereignty within these territories.

The annexation of Vardar Macedonia, the Aegean region, and the Morava Valley by Bulgaria was not ratified by a formal act of the Bulgarian National Assembly. On 14 May 1941, the National Assembly convened a session at which Prime Minister Bogdan Filov delivered a speech declaring the annexation of the so-called "Newly Liberated Lands." Notably, the German and Italian plenipotentiary ministers—von Richthofen and Count Magistrati—were conspicuously absent. The annexation was never formally recognized by either Germany or Italy, although Bulgaria treated it as a fait accompli during the war. In contrast, the cession of Southern Dobruja to Bulgaria in 1940 had been enacted through a formal international treaty, which had entered into force.

In total, Bulgaria's territory increased by 39,756 km², and its population grew by approximately 1,875,904 people. Of this, Vardar Macedonia accounted for 23,807 km² and 1,061,338 inhabitants.

=== Administrative regulation ===
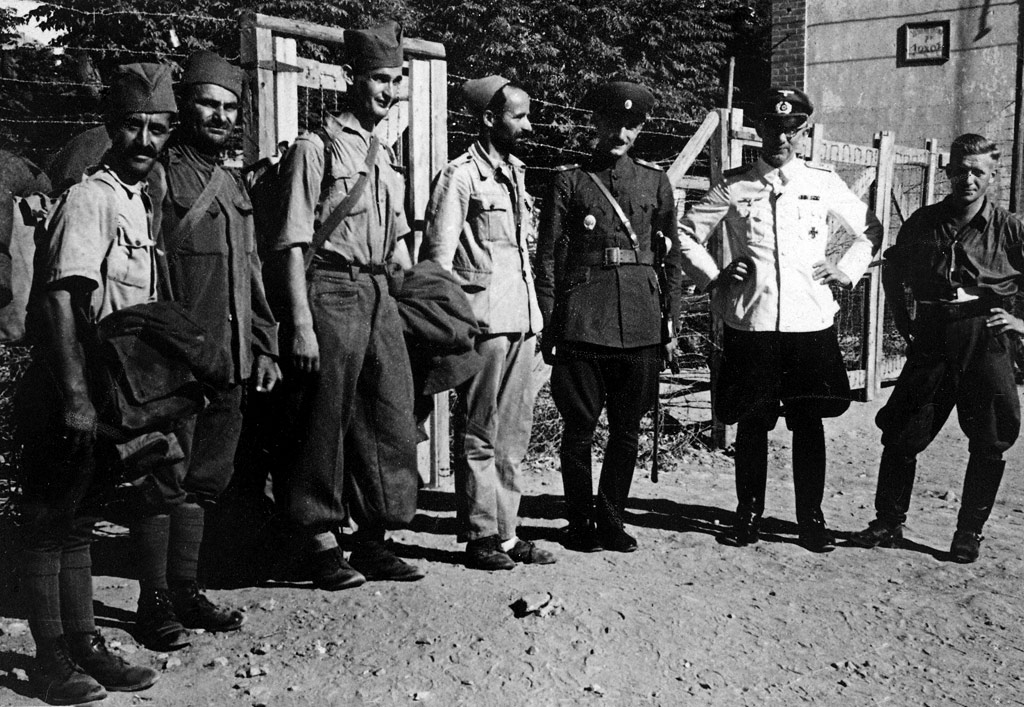
Professor Dimitar Yaranov (third from the right) – at the head of the mission at the Wehrmacht headquarters in Thessaloniki, together with a German officer, frees Greek prisoners of war of Bulgarian origin, June 1941.

An order by Skopje regional governor Anton Kozarov introduced Bulgarian civil administration in the region. Bulgaria implemented its national legislation and established three main administrative centers: Bitola, Skopje, and Xanthi. The dioceses of the Bulgarian Exarchate and the Bulgarian school system were reinstated. The government also took measures to facilitate the return of refugees from Macedonia and Thrace to their native regions.

In Vardar Macedonia, the Skopje administrative region was initially composed of 15 districts: Skopje, Berovo, Boyanovo, Veles, Vranje, Kachanik, Kochani, Kriva Palanka, Kumanovo, Kratovo, Radoviš, Strumica, Sveti Nikole, Surdulica, and Štip. In August 1941, three additional districts—Gevgelija, Kavadarci, and Negotino—were incorporated into the region.

According to administrative data, the ethnic composition of the population in the Skopje region was as follows:

- Bulgarians – 443,933
- Serbs – 152,521
- Albanians – 106,521
- Jews – 3,791
- Others – 25,206

The region comprised 141 municipalities and 1,458 settlements, including towns, villages, and hamlets.

The Bitola administrative district included the following districts: Bitola, Brod, Ohrid, Prilep, Resen, and Kruševo. According to a report dated 8 March 1942, the ethnic composition of the Bitola district was:

- Bulgarians – 80%
- Others (including Turks, Roma, Greeks, Aromanians, Albanians, and a small number of Serbs) – 20%

A police administration was established in both the Skopje and Bitola districts. There were three city police departments (in Bitola, Skopje, and Prilep) and 21 district police departments. Additional regional police commandants were established in the major cities of Skopje and Bitola. The total police force numbered 4,797 officers. State Security departments were also attached to both regional and district administrations.

=== Reorganization of economic, cultural and spiritual life ===
To facilitate the development of the newly liberated territories, Bulgaria significantly increased its national budget—from 8.46 billion leva in 1940 to 14.39 billion in 1942 (a 1.7-fold increase), and further to 27.58 billion in 1943 (3.3 times the 1940 budget), all at a relatively stable exchange rate to the US dollar from 1941 to 1944. These vast sums were used to modernize and transform the previously underdeveloped areas: new schools, hospitals, railway stations, ports, civil and industrial buildings were constructed; swamps were drained, roads and irrigation canals were built (notably in the Syarsko Pole); and shipyards were developed in Kavala and on the island of Thassos. Settlements expanded and barren lands left under prior foreign rule were afforested. In 1941 alone, 500 decares were afforested—compared to just 650 decares during the entire Serbian administration from 1918 to 1941. For flood prevention in the Bitola region, 82,128,000 leva were allocated in 1942. Plans were made for the construction of 84 km of new forest roads and the repair of 70 km of existing ones.

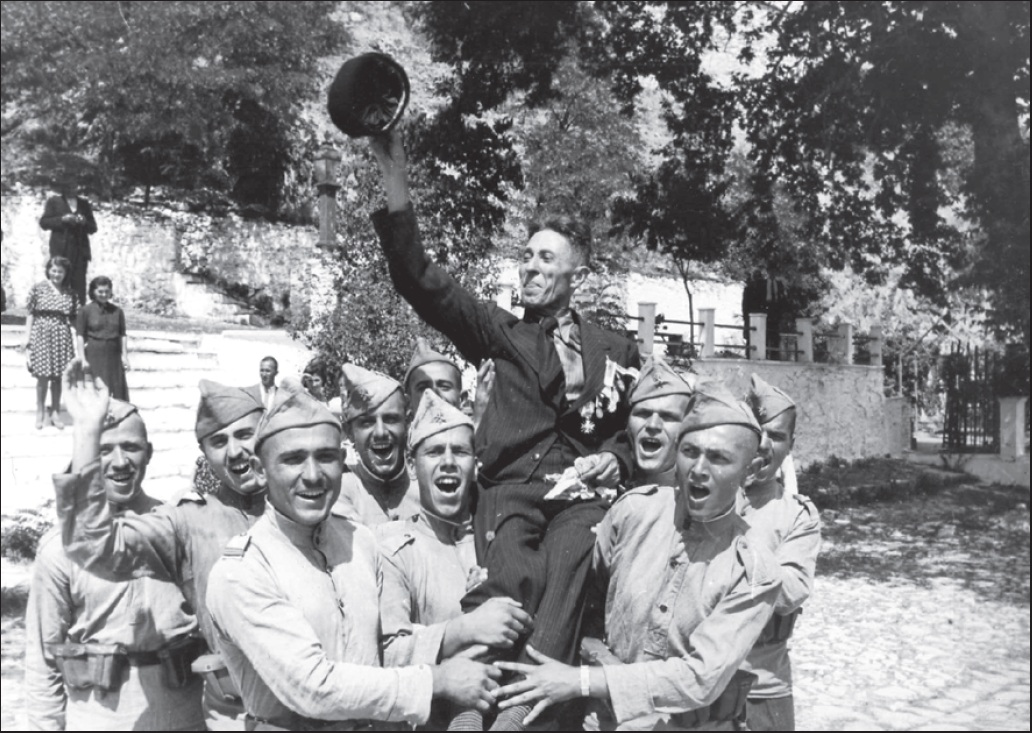
Welcoming the VMRO voivode Petar Lesev by local soldiers in Vardar Macedonia, a year after the annexation of the region by Bulgaria.

The reorganization of cultural life began with the celebration of 24 May, the Day of Bulgarian Education and Culture and of Slavic Script. On 23 May 1941, prominent Bulgarian intellectuals—including Dobri Nemirov, Elisaveta Bagryana, Stiliyan Chilingirov, and Professor Nikola Stoyanov—arrived in Skopje along with many students and cultural figures. Lazar Tomov, a former VMRO activist and then-chairman of the Ilinden Organization, brought with him the flag of the Vardarski Yunak society, banned in 1918 by Serbian authorities.

Celebrations were held across Vardar Macedonia, including in Bitola, Veles, Prilep, Ohrid, Resen, and other cities. By the end of 1941, 64 cultural, educational, sports, and professional societies had been founded in Skopje, including the Boris Drangov choir, the Vardar and Macedonia sports clubs, a society of reserve officers, among others. A Macedonian-Adrianople society was founded in Prilep, and the Georgi Sugarev choir in Bitola.

On 1 September 1941, the National Library was inaugurated in Skopje, housing 206,000 volumes of Bulgarian and foreign literature, along with a folk museum. Georgi Shoptrayanov was appointed library director. On 3 October 1941, the Skopje National Theatre premiered a play written by Kiril Hristov. Youth organizations such as Brannik and SBNL (see: Boris Drangov Legion) were also established and engaged in anti-communist activities.

That summer, a Peyo Yavorov community center was opened in Bitola, with similar centers in surrounding villages including Dihovo, Velushina, Bach, Staravina, Radobor, Novatsi, Ivanevtsi, Strugovo, and Bukovo. These centers were stocked with books supplied by the Ministry of Education, the Directorate for National Propaganda, and other cultural organizations. The centers in Bitola were overseen by the Okoliyski Chitalishte Union, headed by N. Naydenov. Tourist and mountaineering societies, such as Pelister and Pelagonia, were also established. A university board was formed in Bitola, chaired by the regional director Hristo Gutsov, with members including Metropolitan Filaret, Mayor Iliya Nenchev, and other regional officials and intellectuals.

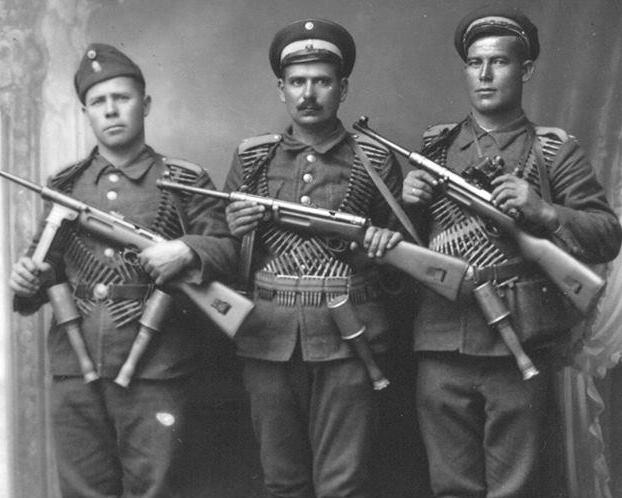
Members of Bulgarian anti-guerrilla detachment in 1943.

Banking infrastructure expanded quickly, with branches of the Bulgarian National Bank, the Bulgarian Agricultural and Cooperative Bank, the Macedonian National Bank, the Popular Bank, and the Bulgarian Credit Bank established in major cities of Vardar Macedonia. By 30 November 1943, the Bulgarian Agricultural and Cooperative Bank had issued 24,650,000 leva in loans. Through this bank, 365 plows, 270 harrows, and 32 threshing machines (trieurs) were distributed by the end of 1941.

Agricultural cooperatives emerged in areas such as Gorni Polog, Glishik, Romanovtsi, Dolyani, and Studena Bara. Regional Economic Chambers and Directorates were formed in Bitola and Skopje to manage agricultural production. Ten million kilograms of wheat were cleaned and dewormed. Ivan Stranski visited from Bulgaria to consult with local experts on soil improvement. A Supreme Agrarian Viceroyalty was established to manage the lands vacated by 36,451 resettled Serbian colonists, redistributing land to landless and low-income peasants. By the end of 1941, 1,500,000 decares were distributed in the Skopje region; in 1942, another 280,500 decares were allocated to 12,020 families.

By early 1943, 72 cooperatives had been established across the region, including 15 in Gevgelija district, 12 in Skopje, 7 in Strumica, 6 in Berovo, 2 in Shtip, 2 in Ohrid, and 1 each in Radovis, Resen, and Sveti Nikole.

On 25 May 1941, a society of engineers and architects led by Dimitar Chkatrov was founded. Construction began on the 105 km Gyueshevo-Kumanovo railway and the Gyueshevo-Kriva Palanka tunnel (unfinished by 100 meters). Bulgarian Army labor units, including Macedonian youth, built a 262 km narrow-gauge railway from Gorna Dzhumaya to Kochani and Shtrubce. Around 12,000 workers participated. Additionally, 259 km of irrigation canals were dug, and 13,692 decares of forest were planted in the Skopje, Veles, and Debar regions. A Sofia–Skopje–Bitola telephone line was installed, and bus routes were launched connecting Skopje to Kyustendil and Sofia, and regional links including Surdulica–Valandovo, Dojran–Valandovo, Shtip–Radovish–Strumica, and Strumica–Petrić. A total of 20,400,000 leva were allocated for road construction, and six roads connecting the region with Bulgaria were planned, costing 77 million leva.

A General Commissariat for Macedonia was established to distribute food supplies. By 31 May 1941, it had imported 145,000 kg of sugar, 13,000 liters of oil, and large quantities of flour and grain into Skopje. By year's end, the Bitola commissariat had distributed flour, sugar, oil, meat, shoes (tservuli), and firewood. A total of 11,500,000 tons of food were sent to Bitola and 2,000,000 tons to Skopje. In addition, 10,100 tons of wheat seed were cleaned and 40,000 fruit saplings prepared for planting.

Public kitchens were opened in Skopje, Veles, Bitola (two kitchens serving 400 poor families), and Shtip. In the Bitola region alone, 90 school canteens fed a total of 60,000 students. Day nurseries were opened in Bitola, Prilep, Ohrid, and Resen. Skopje saw the establishment of orphanages, two homes for the elderly, and two children's homes.

Medical care was also prioritized. On 18 June 1941, the Bulgarian Medical Union for Vardar Macedonia was founded. Between May and December, 37 state outpatient clinics were established in the Skopje region. Hospitals were opened in Skopje (400 beds), Shtip (100), Kumanovo (80), and Vranje (90). A waterworks was initiated in Kochani, while the Skopje and Strumica fields underwent drainage projects in efforts to combat malaria.

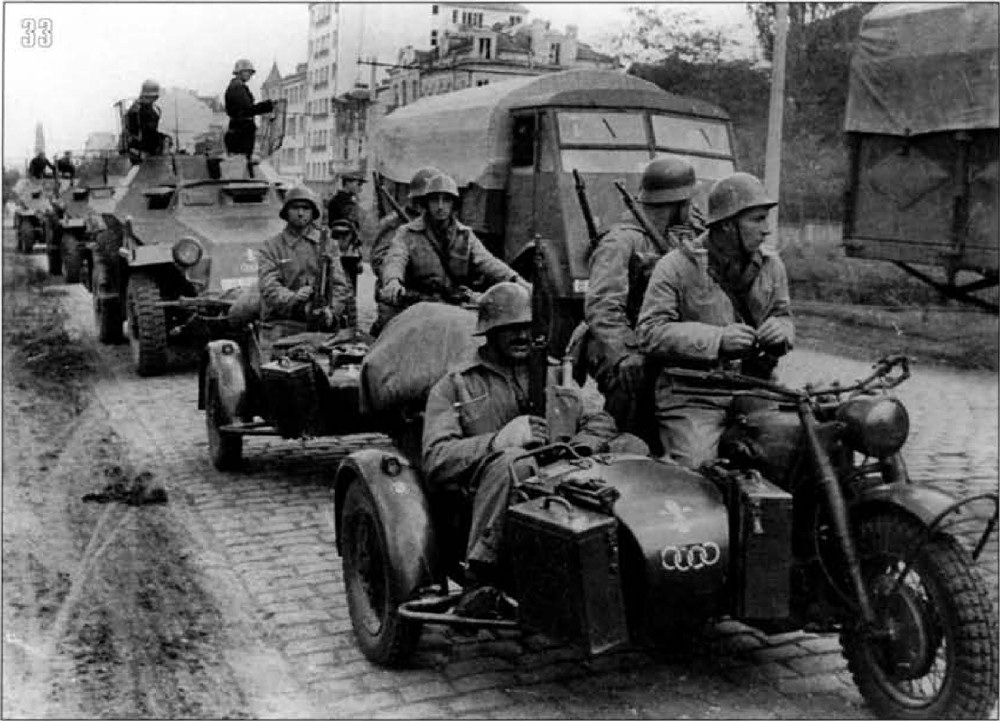
Bulgarian column on its way to Yugoslavia in October 1944.

On 2 February 1943, Bulgaria passed the Law on the Granting of National Pensions to Particularly Meritorious Figures in the Liberation Struggles, providing pensions to veteran revolutionaries from Macedonia, Thrace, Dobrudja, the Morava Valley, and Pirot. During the four-year period of Bulgarian administration in Macedonia, numerous commemorations were held to honor figures and events central to Bulgarian national history.

In 1943, during the 40th anniversary of the Ilinden Uprising, Anton Ketskarov, Kiril Përlichev, and Assen Kavaev established the Ohrid All-Citizens' Foundation "St. Clement", with the goal of building a Macedonian Cultural Center in Ohrid. The Bulgarian government contributed 10 million leva to the project. On 4 May 1943, a memorial service was held in the village of Banitsa to mark the 40th anniversary of Gotse Delchev's death, attended by numerous Bulgarian dignitaries. A commemorative plaque was erected at his burial site, and a donation fund of 100,000 leva was created to finance a monument in his honor. An additional 100,000 leva was raised for a monument at Rashanets, in the Ohrid region, the site of a key Ilinden Uprising battle.

=== Communist resistance ===
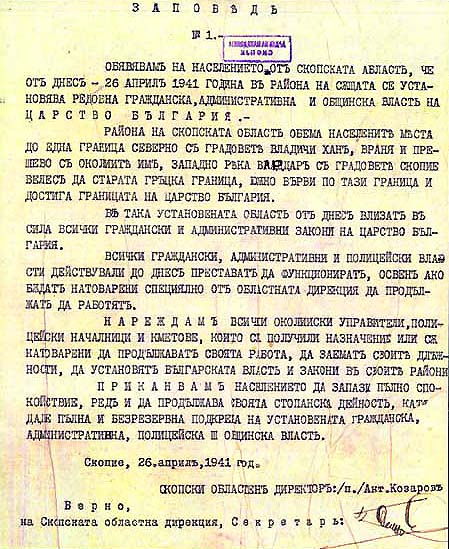
Order of the Skopje Regional Governor Anton Kozarov, introducing Bulgarian rule in the region

Initially, the Border Committee of the League of Communists of Yugoslavia, led by Metodi Shatorov, did not recognize the Bulgarian army as an occupying force. The committee refused to engage in armed resistance against Bulgarian authorities and even attempted to align with the Bulgarian Communist Party. However, following Nazi Germany's invasion of the Soviet Union in June 1941, the communist movement in Bulgaria intensified, and a partisan resistance began to emerge in Vardar Macedonia.

Between 1941 and 1944, a communist-led partisan movement developed in the region, dominated by the Yugoslav Communist Party. This movement played a decisive role in the post-war re-establishment of Yugoslav authority. The armed resistance was spearheaded by the People's Liberation Army of Macedonia organized under the General Staff of the People's Liberation Army and Partisan Detachments of Macedonia (NOV and POM). As the conflict progressed, smaller partisan units were consolidated into the broader National Liberation Army of Macedonia (NOVM).

In response, the Bulgarian administration formed counter-insurgency units specifically tasked with pursuing partisan groups and their supporters. The proposal for these units came from Stefan Simeonov, the regional police chief of the Skopje area. Inspired by Yugoslav anti-IMRO tactics prior to 1941, Simeonov cited Serbian use of counter-units led by figures such as Mihail Kalamatiev and Mino Stankov. Regional Governor Dimitar Raev submitted a request to Interior Minister Petar Gabrovski, who approved the creation of such units. Many members were recruited from supporters of Ivan Mihailov's IMRO faction.

Following the occupation of Greece by Axis forces, the Communist Party of Greece established the National Liberation Front (EAM) and its military wing, the Greek People's Liberation Army (ELAS). These organizations played a crucial role in the Greek resistance. On 16 October 1941, the Greek collaborationist Prime Minister General Georgios Tsolakoglou, sent a memorandum to the German Reich leadership protesting the spread of "Bulgarian propaganda" in Aegean Macedonia.

Later that month, in September 1941, the Drama Uprising broke out in the region of Eastern Macedonia and Thrace. The revolt was quickly and harshly suppressed by Bulgarian forces, resulting in significant reprisals against the civilian population.

== 1942–1943 ==
=== Self-defense of Bulgarians in Aegean Macedonia ===
As early as 1941, Bulgarian officer Andon Kalchev initiated the formation of Bulgarian organizations in the Bulgarian-populated areas of Aegean Macedonia that remained outside the direct control of the Bulgarian army. In Lerin (Florina), the paramilitary organization "Ohrana" was established. In Thessaloniki, a Bulgarian officers' club was formed, which aimed to protect the local Bulgarian population from threats posed by various Greek formations, including ELAS (Greek People's Liberation Army), the Security Battalions, the Thanatos Battalions, and other communist or pro-German groups.

In early 1943, in Kostur (Kastoria), Kalchev founded the "Bulgarian Committee Freedom or Death" (Komitet "Svoboda ili smart") with the assistance of senior Italian military officers. Paramilitary units affiliated with the committee were armed with Italian weapons and operated in the regions of Kostur, Voden (Edessa), and elsewhere.

Following Italy’s capitulation in September 1943, German military forces took control of the Kostur and Lerin regions and provided support to Kalchev's committee and its affiliated formations.

Later in 1943, Bulgarian military units were invited by the German command to occupy the Thessaloniki region. However, they were not permitted to enter the city of Thessaloniki itself.

=== Deportation of Jews from Macedonia, Thrace, and the Pirot region ===
The decision to exterminate all Jews residing in Germany, the territories it occupied, and the territories of its allies was formalized at the Wannsee Conference in 1942. Following this decision, the mass deportation of Jews to German concentration and extermination camps in occupied Eastern Europe began.

The threat to Bulgarian Jews emerged in late 1942, when Nazi Germany began pressuring the Bulgarian government to implement the so-called Final Solution to the Jewish Question within its sphere of influence. On 12 February 1943, the Council of Ministers of Bulgaria approved an agreement to deport 20,000 Jews to Germany. However, the Bulgarian government agreed only to deport Jews from the "new" territories—Macedonia, Thrace, and the Pirot region—claiming that these individuals were not Bulgarian citizens.

In March 1943, a total of 11,480 Jews were deported from these regions, under direct orders from Heinrich Himmler and pressure from the German ambassador to Sofia, Adolf-Heinz Beckerle. Between 22 March and 1 April, the Macedonian Jews were interned in the Tobacco Monopoly building in Skopje, which was used as a temporary detention center.

According to a report by German Consul Witte in Skopje, segments of the local population reportedly supported the deportation. Nevertheless, the Bulgarian authorities did release several individuals, including Jews of Italian nationality, medical professionals, and others deemed essential. Among the few who were rescued were Rafael Moshe Kamhi and Illés Spitz, whose cases are notable exceptions.

Meanwhile, in German-occupied Thessaloniki, nearly 50,000 Jews were deported to extermination camps with the assistance of Greek collaborators. The Jews deported from the Bulgarian-administered territories were handed over to the Germans, who transported them to the Treblinka extermination camp, resulting in the near-total destruction of the Jewish communities in these regions.

Since the initial agreement called for the deportation of 20,000 individuals, the Bulgarian authorities began to plan the deportation of Jews from "Old Bulgaria" to meet the quota. However, this move triggered widespread public protests, most notably led by the Bulgarian Orthodox Church, as well as by politicians, intellectuals, and ordinary citizens. As a result of this public outcry, the Bulgarian government ultimately postponed and later cancelled the deportation of Jews from the pre-1941 borders of the country, thereby saving approximately 48,000 people.

== Events in the fall of 1944 ==
=== Withdrawal of the Bulgarian administration and army from the region ===
On 26 August 1944, under the threat of the Red Army advancing through Romania, the government of Ivan Bagryanov declared Bulgaria's neutrality in the war between Nazi Germany and the Soviet Union. The government ordered all German troops to leave Bulgarian territory, stating that those who refused would be disarmed. In the following days, Bulgaria broke off diplomatic relations with Germany, requested a formal armistice from the United States and Great Britain, and began preparing the withdrawal of its troops from territories annexed from Yugoslavia and Greece.

Amid these developments, Professor Assen Kantardzhiev, leader of the nationalist "Ratnik" (Warrior) organization, attempted to convince General Kocho Stoyanov, commander of the Fifth Army, to march on Sofia, establish military rule, overthrow the government, and appoint Aleksandar Tsankov as prime minister. On 30 August, Stoyanov, still undecided, left Skopje for Sofia to assess the situation. Meanwhile, on 4 September, German troops captured the headquarters of the Bulgarian occupation corps in Niška Banja, along with the command posts of three Bulgarian divisions stationed there. Despite these events, the Soviet Union declared war on Bulgaria on 5 September 1944.

During this period, after consultations in Sofia, Ivan Mihailov arrived in Skopje with the intention of proclaiming an Independent Republic of Macedonia. However, realizing that the region's fate was again determined by larger geopolitical forces, he abandoned the plan.

On 6 September, the Bulgarian government decided to declare war on Germany, effective 8 September. The goal was to regroup Bulgarian forces in Macedonia and Eastern Serbia and prevent a German offensive toward Sofia aimed at supporting a planned coup. However, the conspiracy failed, and Major General Stoyanov was arrested in Sofia on the same day. Later that day, the headquarters of the Fifth Bulgarian Army received orders to gather all occupation units in Prilep by 9 September and then withdraw together to Bulgaria's pre-1941 borders. This maneuver was intended to block the German advance toward Bulgaria.

General Alexander Popdimitrov, who replaced Stoyanov, concluded an agreement with the German headquarters in Skopje on 7 September 1944 for a "symbolic" war in Macedonia. This maneuver had mixed consequences. The Bulgarian units became confused and demoralized, initiating a chaotic and disorganized retreat. German troops withdrawing from Greece clashed with fragmented Bulgarian units, capturing many. Since over half the soldiers in these units were locals, many deserted, handed over their weapons to the partisans, or joined their ranks. Some commanders were arrested or killed by their own men.

Hostilities between Bulgarian forces and the Wehrmacht in Macedonia began immediately after the 9 September 1944 coup in Sofia. General Vladimir Ketskarov was appointed commander of the Fifth Army and was instructed by Minister of Defense Damyan Velchev to coordinate joint actions with the Main Headquarters of the Partisan Movement. A meeting took place in Pehčevo, but no cooperation was achieved due to tensions between the parties. The Bulgarian army continued its retreat. Only the 17th Infantry Division, closest to the old Bulgarian border, managed a complete withdrawal. The 15th Division resisted and engaged in combat at Bitola and Prilep, with air support from the Bulgarian Air Force, until 21 September, after which it retreated to Bulgaria in smaller groups.

Despite the new Bulgarian government's declaration of war against the Axis powers, Yugoslav partisans were ordered to treat the retreating Bulgarian forces as enemies. However, in the first days following the 9 September coup, Bulgarian forces did succeed in pushing back German units on the Kula–Vidin and Kyustendil–Sofia fronts.

Bulgaria had already begun withdrawing from central Aegean Macedonia in late August. However, the 7th Infantry Division blocked the Struma River valley, which led to the eastern part of the region, and in mid-September successfully repelled several German attacks. At that time, Bulgaria hoped to retain parts of the Newly Liberated Lands, including access to the Aegean Sea. The Soviet Union initially considered allowing Bulgaria to retain at least Western Thrace to secure a strategic outlet to the Aegean. However, Great Britain, whose forces were entering Greece, insisted that a precondition for an armistice with Bulgaria was the full withdrawal of its troops to pre-1941 borders.

By late September, administrative control of the Aegean region began to pass to local Greek partisan authorities. In early October, Sava Ganovski was sent to coordinate the final handover of power. On 10 October, the Bulgarian army began a rapid evacuation, abandoning property valued at approximately 26 billion leva. Thousands of Bulgarians, displaced once again, followed the retreating army as refugees. The withdrawal was completed by 26 October 1944, when a delegation led by Dobri Terpeshev officially handed over authority to the ELAS.

=== Switching to the Allies ===
In practice, military operations against Germany began after the Fatherland Front came to power in Bulgaria. The new government, led by Kimon Georgiev of the Zveno movement, immediately signed an armistice with the Soviet Union and officially declared war on Nazi Germany, thereby joining the Allies.

The geopolitical situation in the Balkans in the autumn of 1944 was favorable for the implementation of the foreign policy goals of Yugoslav politicians, particularly the restoration of Yugoslavia's pre-war borders. As a former ally of the Third Reich, Bulgaria found itself in a state of severe international isolation. Its position was further complicated by the lack of regional allies—Romania faced a similar predicament, Turkey maintained a hostile attitude, and Greece was on the brink of civil war.

In this context, the most reliable regional partner for the new Bulgarian government was the National Committee for the Liberation of Yugoslavia (the de facto government of Josip Broz Tito's resistance movement). On 5 October 1944, a military cooperation agreement was concluded in Craiova between representatives of Bulgaria and the Yugoslav resistance. As part of this agreement, both parties consented not to raise the contentious issues of the Western Outlands or the Pirin region until the end of the war.

On 28 October 1944, Bulgaria signed the so-called Moscow Armistice with the Soviet Union, the United States, and Great Britain, formally aligning itself with the Allied Powers.

=== Re-entry of the Bulgarian army into the region ===
On 18 September 1944, the Bulgarian Army was placed under the operational command of Marshal Fyodor Tolbukhin, commander of the Soviet 3rd Ukrainian Front. The mobilization of the army—now renamed the Bulgarian People's Army—began on the same day and was completed by the end of the month.

As part of the forces of the 3rd Ukrainian Front, the Bulgarian Army was assigned several strategic objectives: to secure the left flank of the Red Army, to defeat enemy forces in Serbia and Vardar Macedonia, and to block the retreat of Army Group E of the German Wehrmacht from Greece via the Morava, Vardar, and Ibar river valleys. The Bulgarian military contingent consisted of 10 divisions, 8 brigades, and other supporting units.

From 8 to 14 October 1944, Bulgarian troops launched the Niš operation, during which the elite 7th SS Volunteer Mountain Division "Prinz Eugen" was defeated, and the city of Niš was captured. Concurrently, from 8 October to 19 November, the Stracin–Kumanovo operation was conducted, resulting in the capture of Stracin, Kumanovo, and Skopje. Simultaneously, the Bregalnica–Strumica Operation pushed Wehrmacht forces out of Tsarevo Selo, Kočani, Štip, Strumica, Veles, and surrounding areas.

From 21 October to 30 November, the Kosovo Operation was carried out, during which Bulgarian troops captured Podujevë, Pristina, Mitrovica, Raška, and Novi Pazar.

Despite these successes, Yugoslav partisans, under political instruction, were ordered to treat Bulgarian troops as occupying forces, which they did demonstratively. As a result of pressure from Tito's partisans, following the liberation of Vardar Macedonia and the Morava Valley, the Second and Fourth Bulgarian Armies were ordered to withdraw to Bulgaria’s pre-war borders. Only the First Bulgarian Army remained under the command of the Soviet 3rd Ukrainian Front for continued operations.

This redeployment was in line with the terms of the armistice agreement, under which Bulgaria agreed to place its armed forces under the command of the Soviet High Command and to withdraw all Bulgarian military personnel, administrative authorities, and civilians from Vardar Macedonia, the Morava Valley, and the Aegean region. The agreement also placed Bulgaria under the supervision of an Allied Control Commission, effectively treating it as an occupied state during the post-war transition.

== See also ==
- Bulgarian resistance movement during World War II
- World War II in Yugoslav Macedonia
