= Apio =

Apio may refer to:

- Apio (surname)
- Apio (appetizer), a Balkan Jewish appetizer
- Apios americana, a perennial vine that bears edible beans and large edible tubers, common in Japan and Korea
- Celeriac, Apium graveolens, var. rapaceum, also known as celery root
