= Panhellenic Liberation Organization =

Greek resistance organization during WWII

- Leader: Spyros Spiridis
- Dates active: 1941–1944
- Headquarters: Thessaloniki
- Active regions: Macedonia and Western Thrace
- Ideology: Anti-communism; Greek nationalism
- Size: Several hundred (1944)
- Part of: Greek Resistance (1941–1943); Hellenic State (1944)
- Wars: the Greek Resistance

The Panhellenic Liberation Organization (Greek: Πανελλήνιος Απελευθερωτική Οργάνωσις (ΠΑΟ), Panellinios Apeleftherotiki Organosis (PAO)), was a Greek resistance organization against the Axis occupation of Greece. It was founded in 1941 by a group of Greek army officers, under the name Defenders of Northern Greece (Υπερασπισταί Βορείου Ελλάδος, YBE; Yperaspistai Voreiou Ellados, YVE), employing methods of non violent resistance. In 1943, YVE was renamed as the Panhellenic Liberation Organization (PAO), shifting its focus towards armed struggle. In the August of the same year it came into conflict with Greek People's Liberation Army (ELAS), a communist-led resistance organization. PAO was defeated in the ensuing civil war and its remnants turned towards collaboration with the Germans.

== Background ==
On 28 October 1940, Italy declared war on Greece, expecting a swift victory but the invasion failed and the Italians were pushed back into Albania. As the war dragged on, on 6 April 1941 Germany was forced to intervene to support its struggling ally. The small Greek force defending the Metaxas Line on the Greco–Bulgarian border was defeated by the better equipped and numerically superior Germans. The German penetration deep into Greece made further resistance at the Albanian front pointless, ending the Battle of Greece in the favor of the Axis Powers. Greece was subjected to a triple occupation by Germany, Italy and Bulgaria. Unlike Italy and Germany, Bulgaria did not administer eastern Macedonia and the parts of Western Thrace it controlled through Greek collaborators, but annexed the area to form the province of Belomorie. The Bulgarian language was made compulsory in all administrative matters, as well as in the education and liturgy. Businessmen were forced to accept Bulgarian partners or even hand their property over to Bulgarian control. Efforts to promote Bulgarisation were also enacted in the German-controlled Greek Macedonia, through the creation of Bulgarian clubs in all major towns. The first resistance organization in northern Greece was founded in May 1941; Eleutheria (Liberty) united people from across the political spectrum ranging from communists to Venizelists. The group was short-lived, as internal political disagreements and the work of Axis intelligence services suppressed its activities, but bands belonging to the Communist-led National Liberation Front (EAM) and its Greek People's Liberation Army (ELAS), continued to emerge in the region.

== Operation ==
On 10 July 1941, army officers Majors I. Papathanassiou, Th. Barbas, E. Dortas and Captain Anastasios Sakellaridis founded Defenders of Northern Greece (YBE), a Greek nationalist resistance organization. Its goals were the preservation of the territorial integrity of Greece and the countering any Bulgarian attempts to absorb Greek Macedonia. Its membership was drawn mostly from the pre-war military and the still functioning state administration, and politically belonged to the right, professing loyalty to the Greek government in exile and King George II. Nevertheless, like most resistance groups at the time, by 1943 did accept vague references to post-war "socialism" and accepted the entry of socialist members into its ranks. The organization it was a fierce opponent of EAM-ELAS, especially given the Comintern's well publicized pre-war support for the inclusion of Greek Macedonia into a greater "autonomous Macedonia", which would inevitably fall under Yugoslav or Bulgarian hegemony. Its headquarters were located in the offices of the Prefecture Inspection Service of the General Administration of Thessaloniki.

YBE hoped to halt Bulgarian encroachment in Macedonia by proving their loyalty to the German authorities and in turn gaining their support. YBE member and prefect of Pella Georgios Themelis, issued a declaration which stated that whoever fights the Germans is an enemy of Greece. Their pleas fell on deaf ears, as the Germans continued to tolerate if not encourage Bulgarian efforts. YBE then shifted its focus towards smuggling fighters into the Middle East, where they were to join the Free Greek Forces of the Greek government-in-exile. In September of 1941, the communist-led Drama uprising (since ELAS was created only in 1942) failed and the population was subjected to mass reprisals. Hundreds of Greeks were killed, dozens of villages were razed and thousands of people were made refugees. YBE's persistence with non-violent resistance proved to be unpopular, costing it many defections. In early 1943, agents of the British Special Operations Executive (SOE) landed in Greece to execute Operation Animals, an Allied diversionary operation. The British also sought to foster the expansion of the right wing National Republican Greek League (EDES) in Epirus and YBE in Macedonia, to counterbalance ELAS.

As part of this effort, the leadership of YBE agreed to embrace armed struggle, forming guerilla bands in rural areas. A parallel increase in Axis atrocities after the entry of Bulgarian troops into western Macedonia, reinforced their decision. In July 1943, YBE was renamed Panhellenic Liberation Organization (PAO) and absorbed former members of National Social Defense (EKA) a small right wing resistance organization. PAO's armed wing was named National Army (ES), it also formed a women's branch called PAOE and youth branch called PAON. PAO also illegally published a newspaper called National Voice (EF), its first edition was published in Thessaloniki on 25 May 1943. Its 500 to 1,000 copies were distributed to young officers. Its other branches likewise published their own newspapers. In the Kilkis area, PAO was commanded by Hellenic Gendarmerie members Aiantas Tsamaloukas, Konstantinos Mitsou and Isaac Bechlevanidis. The units in the Chalkidiki region fell under the command of Captain Thanasis Skordas and Lieutenant Vasilis Kiparissis respectively. PAO's main force, consisting of the 19th Battalion, was led by Spyros "Strymonas" Spiridis, stationed around Nigrita. Western Thrace was the theater of operations for three bands, commanded by Panagiotis Koutridis, Giorgos Arvanitidis and Lefteris Tsaousidis Tsochos. Most of PAO's membership was composed of western Pontic Greeks, who had settled in northern Greece following the Greco-Turkish population exchange. ELAS' Macedonian units contained numerous eastern Pontic Greeks, who had migrated to Greece via the Soviet Union and become influenced by the latter in their political convictions.

At the same time, however, ELAS began forcibly disarming smaller non-communist guerrilla groups and either amalgamating them in its own ranks or disbanding them entirely. ELAS justified its action by accusing YBE and other right-wing groups of collaboration with the German occupation authorities, a charge in which, according to SOE officer Chris Woodhouse, "there was some justice [...] because Greek nationalists, like Mihailović in Yugoslavia, regarded the Germans as a less serious enemy than the Bulgarians or the Communists". Despite their anti-autonomist ideology PAO never participated in military engagements against the Italian army, the Vlach Legion or other autonomists. EAM-ELAS constantly viewed any group not belonging to itself with distrust and accused them as "collaborators", but in many cases it was a self-fulfilling prophecy, as ELAS's attacks on the right-wing groups forced the remnants of the latter to make common cause with the Germans against ELAS.

Consequently, from the moment of PAO's formation, relations with ELAS were strained and no effort was put into combining their operations. PAO managed to gain the support of the Turkish-speaking Pontic Greeks, who maintained independent resistance networks and were similarly anti-communist. In August, ELAS fighters in the area of Kilkis began pressuring PAO insurgents into disarming. When ELAS applied the same tactic on the Turkish-speaking Pontians, the latter murdered seven regional ELAS commanders in the village of Imera, near Kozani. By the end of the month the conflict between the two group had escalated into a civil war which continued until December. ELAS managed to destroy PAO's armed units, before they managed to regroup in Chalkidiki. In January 1944, the remnant of PAO, consisting of several hundred men, requested aid from the German authorities and they were reformed into collaborationist, counter-insurgency units. Under German direction, PAO took part in operations against ELAS, while attacking the Bulgarian army with the tacit approval of the Germans. From then on PAO operated under the umbrella of the Security Battalions organized by the collaborationist government in Athens, committing numerous atrocities. Its field commanders Vichos and Dangoulas signed a declaration, pledging to fight the Allies alongside Germany, while others such as Michalagas wore German army uniforms. Only in eastern Macedonia, which lay inside the Bulgarian occupation zone, were nationalist resistance organizations, chiefly that of Tsaous Anton, able to resist ELAS. By June 1944, swelled by officers from PAO and EDES, they were the dominant force in the region.

ELAS remained the dominant resistance organization in the rest of northern Greece until the end of the war. After the Treaty of Varkiza significantly weakened the communists, while the Greek army and gendarmerie were reformed by former members of anti-communist resistance organizations, including former collaborators. The political conflict in Greece continued until the end of the Greek Civil War in 1949, when the communists were defeated.
