= The Holocaust in North Macedonia =

The Holocaust in what is today North Macedonia saw the mass murder of Macedonian Jews in World War II as a result of deportation organized by the governments of Kingdom of Bulgaria and Nazi Germany, with the aim of systematically eliminating the Jewish population from the so-called "Newly liberated lands". Though allied with the Germans, the Bulgarian government refused to deport Jews residing in "Old Bulgaria". Bulgarian authorities did, however, deport Jews without Bulgarian citizenship from all the territories occupied by Bulgaria (Vardar Macedonia and Pomoravie (Kingdom of Yugoslavia) and Belomorie (Kingdom of Greece)). All Jews from Bulgarian-occupied zone of modern North Macedonia were deported to the Treblinka extermination camp in occupied-Poland, where they were suffocated in gas chambers. Not a single witness survived to recount the horrors of the destruction of the Jewish population. Documents are the only witnesses to prove the fate of the Jews in occupied Vardar Banovina.

Over 7,000 Jews were deported from Vardar Macedonia, while including those from Bulgarian-occupied Greece, around 11,400. According to data from October 1945, only 419 people remained on the territory of present-day Macedonia, whose community today numbers around 200.

== Anti-Semitism in Bulgaria ==
Unlike Romania (also an ally of Nazi Germany), where Jewish victimization at the beginning of the war was around 50%, in Bulgaria Jewish victimization was around 20%. In both countries, anti-Semitism was on the rise between 1899 and 1939. However, the situation worsened as the country's economic situation deteriorated, and anti-Semitism grew as the majority of Jews made up the middle class in society.

=== Law for the Protection of the Nation ===
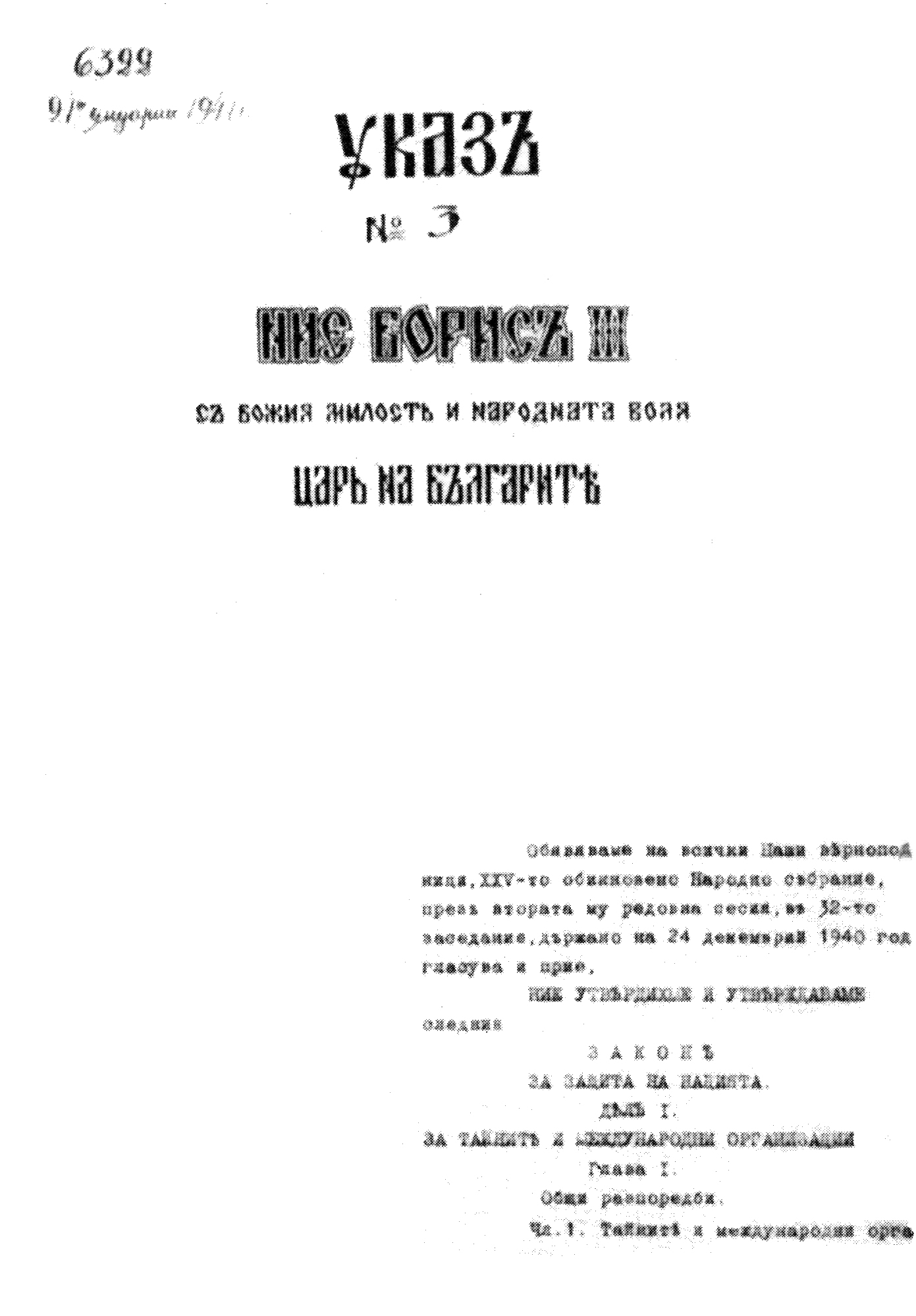
The decree of the King of Bulgaria proclaiming the Law for Protection of the Nation

In July 1940, Bulgaria began to enact anti-Semitic laws. In January 1941, it enacted the "Law for Protection of the Nation". On 1 March 1941, Bulgaria became an ally of the Axis Powers.

When implementing the "Law for the Protection of the Nation", special attention was paid to the fourth chapter, which dealt with "On the Property of Persons of Jewish Origin", as well as the fifth chapter, "On the Professional and Economic Activity of Persons of Jewish Origin". This law listed all possible occupations that Jews were not allowed to engage in, which reduced their ability to earn a decent living. With the deprivation of basic civil rights, the heartless and systematic liquidation of Jews within the borders of the then Third Bulgarian Empire actually began.

From the very beginning of the occupation, the Bulgarians began to implement the law. On April 9, 1941, it was noted that all Jewish houses, commercial and craft shops in Bitola were marked.

The value of all confiscated items was to be entered in Bulgarian leva. The commission responsible for the inventory of the property of Macedonian Jews completed its work towards the end of 1941. For the work of the commission that carried out the confiscation, both the Bulgarians and the Germans blackmailed the Jews by demanding money or other valuables so that they would not enter the real value of the items. In this way, a complete record of the property of the Jews was carried out.

In 1942, the pressure on the Jews increased even more when three special inspectors for the "Jewish question" arrived in Bitola. In fact, their arrival was connected with the start of the full genocide by mutual agreement between the Bulgarian and German fascists. The economic liquidation of the Jews began.

Special notices were sent to Jews who were working abroad outside their homeland, informing them that they had to pay a certain fine to the state. Such notices were sent to Jewish workers in America, Croatia, Bosnia, Palestine, Serbia, Greece, and Aegean Macedonia (Thessaloniki). These Jewish workers paid a total of 34,000,000 leva in fines. Those who did not pay the fines were detained and their property confiscated.

Despite all this, Bulgaria, like Romania, managed to preserve its own Jewish population. However, some consider the rescue of 50,000 Jews in the so-called Old Bulgaria to be a "unique act".

In the face of the fascist government, the Bulgarian Orthodox Church and a large number of Bulgarian intellectuals at that time stood up for the protection of the Jews and against the shameful act that was publicly carried out by the government of Bogdan Filov. Among them was the speaker of the then parliament, Dimitar Peshev, who publicly opposed the servile policy towards Berlin. Patriarch Kirill, the speaker of the parliament, Dimitar Peshev, together with 42 members of parliament, and Bulgarian intellectuals failed to prevent the deportation of the Jews from the occupied Bulgarian territories, Macedonia and Thrace.

== Preparations ==
The liquidation of the Jews of Macedonia was the result of an agreement between Nazi Germany and the Kingdom of Bulgaria. On 2 February 1943, the agreement was signed on behalf of both countries by Adolf-Heinz Beckerle, German Minister Plenipotentiary in Bulgaria and Petar Gabrovski, the Bulgarian Minister of the Interior.

The specific plans for the deportation were documented in a report dated 12 November 1942 from the German Foreign Ministry to the German Legation in Sofia, which stated that "The Bulgarian Government reports with particular satisfaction that the Jewish question will finally be resolved." In addition, the Bulgarian government requested that Germany provide it with detailed plans for the deportation of Jews from Romania so that it could take the necessary measures for the deportation of Jews.

The Bulgarian government ordered the Commissariat for Jewish Affairs to compile lists of the entire Jewish population in Macedonia, with the property of all family members, age, sex, profession and street, number and place of residence. The deadline for submitting the main lists was only a few days. The delegate of the Skopje Jewish municipality was required, in addition to the lists of the Jewish population of Skopje, to submit lists of Jews living in places where, due to the small number of Jews, Jewish municipalities had not been formed. These were: Kumanovo, Preševo, Udovo, Gevgelija, Kriva Palanka and Bujanovac. The collected data showed that in 1941 in Skopje there were 1181 families with 3795 members, in Bitola there were 810 families with 3351 members, in Shtip 140 families with 551 members, in Kumanovo 7 families with 17 members, in Gevgelija 3 families with 11 members, in Veles there were 2 families with 8 members, in Kriva Palanka 1 family with 5 members, and in the remaining places 6 families with 28 members. This amounts to a total of 2,150 families with 7,762 members.

The fascist governments of Bulgaria and Nazi Germany secretly negotiated the transfer of the Jewish population of the occupied Bulgarian territories to the Germans. On February 22, 1943, an agreement was signed in Sofia for the deportation of 20,000 Jews from the territories occupied by Bulgaria, namely from Thrace and Macedonia. The deportation would take place in the eastern German areas (i.e. Poland). The agreement was signed by Alexander Belev, Commissioner of the Commissariat for Jewish Affairs at the Ministry of Internal Affairs and Public Health in Sofia, and by the German captain of the protective detachments (SS divisions) Theodor Dannecker. The agreement was adopted after the approval of the Bulgarian Council of Ministers. The agreement determined the departure railway stations, as follows:

- from Skopje 5,000 people in 5 trains;
- from Bitola 3000 people in 3 trains;
- from Pirot 2000 people in 2 trains;
- from Gorna Dzumaya 3000 people in 3 trains;
- from Dupnitsa 3000 people in 3 trains;
- from Radomir 4000 people in 4 trains.

The Minister of Internal Affairs and Public Health Petar Gabrovski submitted a report to the Council of Ministers that, in accordance with the agreement reached between Bulgaria and Germany, 20,000 people of Jewish origin from the "newly liberated lands" were to be deported from the country and that they would be placed in camps in the cities of: Skopje, Pirot, Gorna Dzumaya, Dupnitsa and Radomir. The Council of Ministers authorized the Commissioner for Jewish Affairs to implement the agreement. From the letter of Beckerle (the German Minister Plenipotentiary to the German Foreign Ministry in Bulgaria), dated January 22, 1943, regarding the talks with the Bulgarian Foreign Minister on the deportation of Jews, it is confirmed that in addition to the activities undertaken against the Jews, the Jews from the “newly liberated territories” would first have to be deported. In the negotiations between the German Nazi government and the Bulgarian fascist government, the deportation, that is, the sending to death camps of not only Jews from the “newly liberated territories”, but also from the old regions of Bulgaria, is constantly present.

In the telegram of April 4, 1943 from Joachim von Ribbentrop, Foreign Minister of Nazi Germany, sent to the German Legation in Sofia regarding the talks in Berlin with Tsar Boris on the Jewish problem, point 4 states “...The Tsar stated that so far he has only given consent for the deportation to Eastern Europe of Jews from Macedonia and Thrace. As for the Jews from Bulgaria itself, he wants only a small number of Bolshevik-communist elements to emigrate. The other 25,000 Jews will be gathered in concentration camps in the country, because there is a need for road construction. I did not dwell on the Tsar's statement and contented myself with emphasising to him that in our opinion only a radical solution is the only true solution to the Jewish question..."

The signing of the agreement was followed by Protocol No. 32 of the Council of Ministers of March 2, 1943, which provided for the organizational measures for the deportation of 20,000 Jews from the "new" and "old" regions of Bulgaria and for the confiscation of their property.

== Arrest and deportation ==
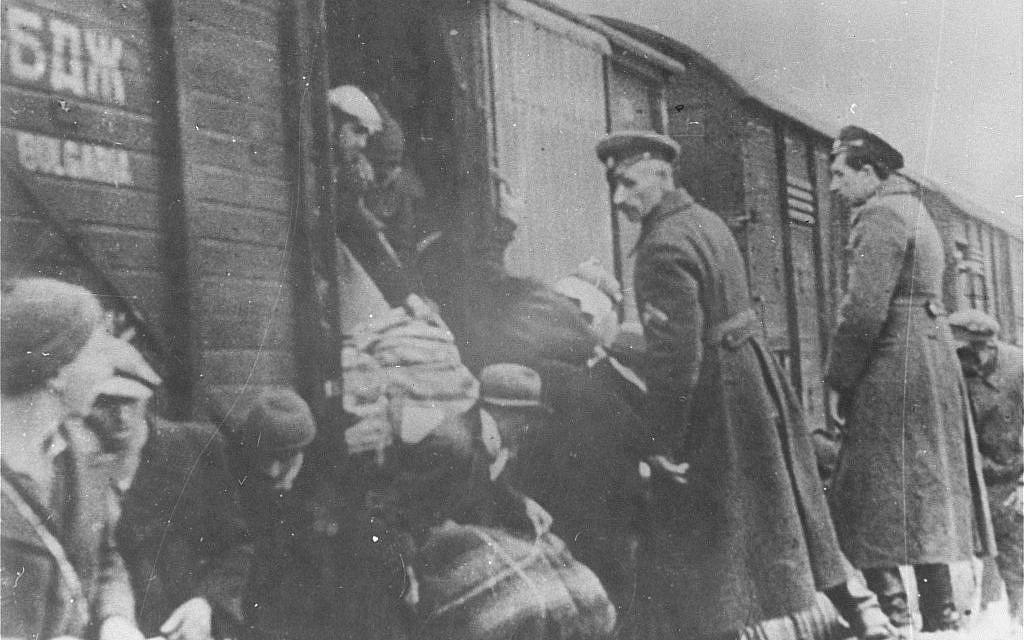
The Bulgarian occupation authorities load Macedonian Jews into the carriages of the Bulgarian State Railways.

On the night between 10 and 11 March 1943, the cities of Bitola, Shtip and Skopje were blocked, and the Jewish neighborhoods were surrounded by Bulgarian troops and police. In the early morning hours of 11 March, the round-up of the Jews began. Several armed policemen, agents and soldiers went from house to house and rounded up the Jews. They loaded the women, children and the sick into trucks or freight cars. The policemen told the people to take all their valuables and money with them, because they would need them, and that they would be transferred to Bulgaria. The looting of property began on the spot, in the houses, during the round-up of the Jews. It continued at the railway stations in Bitola and Shtip, but also at the State Monopoly in Skopje. The property and assets of the deported Jews were estimated to be around 16 million US dollars (estimate made in 2006). A small part of the confiscated items held by the Archives of Macedonia (including a child's bracelet, a gold Turkish coin and earring, eight gold tooth covers, etc.) have been in the Holocaust Memorial Center of the Jews of Macedonia since February 2011.

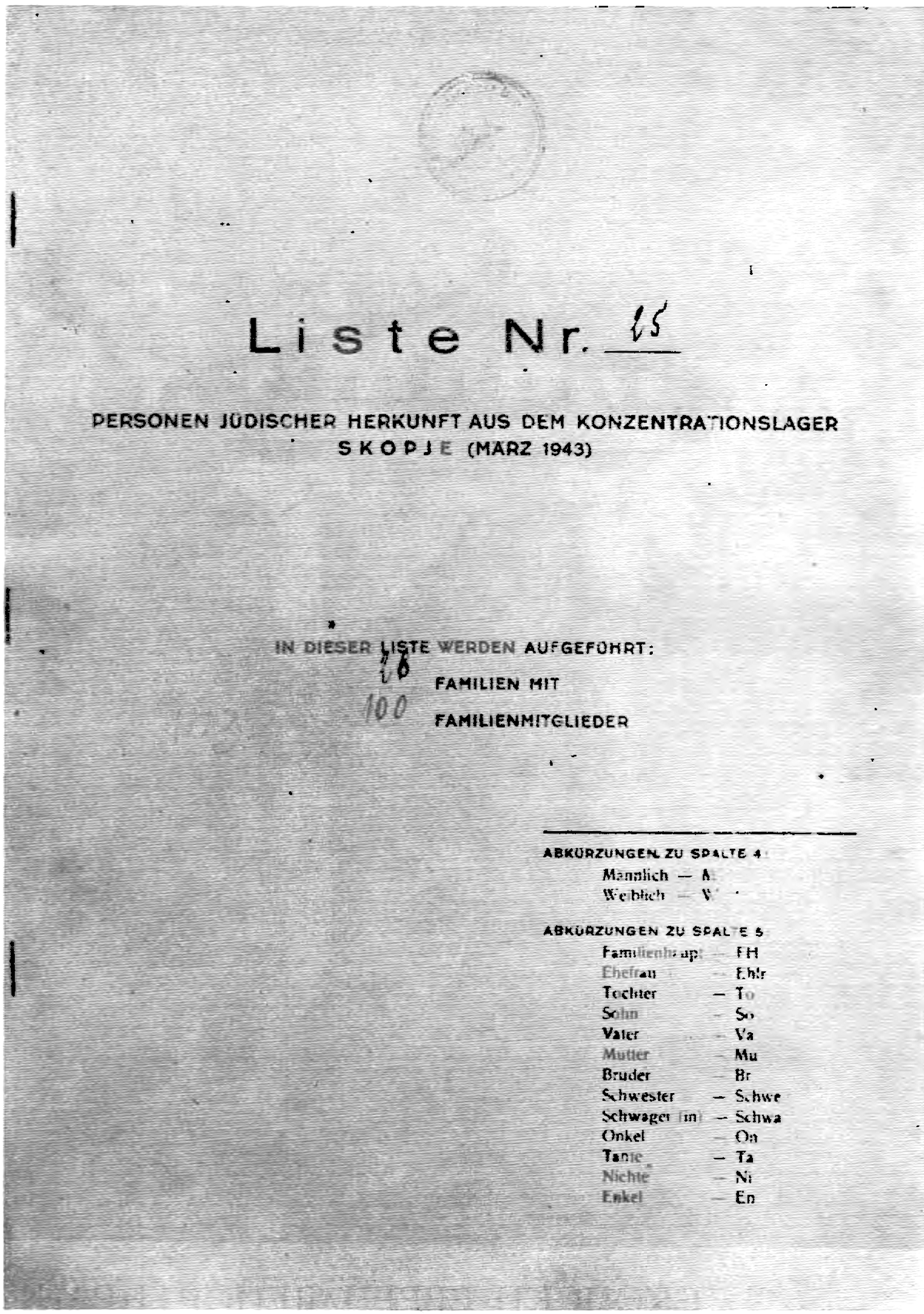
List No.25 of the deported Macedonian Jews

The Main Directorate of Railways was ordered, free of charge, to transport Jews from Macedonia and the Aegean Sea by special trains to places designated by the Commissariat for Jewish Affairs. The requisition commissions were ordered to seize buildings in populated areas designated by the Commissariat for Jewish Affairs necessary for the creation of camps where the deportees would be housed. Civilians were mobilized to guard Jewish property after the Jews were evicted until their liquidation. The guards were paid from the Jewish Municipalities Fund. All immovable property of the deported Jews was confiscated by the Bulgarian state. All movable property of the deported Jews was to be sold by the Commissariat for Jewish Affairs, by special order, and the proceeds were to be transferred to the Jewish Municipalities Fund. The Commissariat for Jewish Affairs was instructed to deport 20,000 Jews, as stipulated in the agreement with the German authorities.

The Commissariat for Jewish Affairs also issued the "Regulations for the Organization and Operation of Temporary Concentration Camps". The Regulations stipulated in advance extremely inhumane procedures. Some of the articles of the Regulations are listed below:

Article 7 of the Regulations stipulated that the use of the latrines was to be done in groups accompanied by guards.

Article 10 prohibited lighting stoves or bringing in braziers - without heating in the winter of 1943, which was exceptionally cold. Article 13 of the Rules states that detainees are left with only blankets, clothing and food, everything else is taken away. Article 18 prohibits looking out the windows, opening them, writing letters and reading newspapers. Article 25 provides for food twice a day, and for children up to 10 years old three times a day, etc. A dozen orders were issued appointing people for various technical services in the camp, starting on March 9.

In Skopje, the buildings of the Skopje State Monopoly, which were located next to the railway station and were suitable for further transport, were adapted for the camp. Although the preparations were carried out in the utmost secrecy through various channels, including activists from the People's Liberation Movement, it became known that something was being prepared against the Jews. It was not known how many and where they would be interned (in Bulgaria or elsewhere). Nothing was known about the death camps. The fascist press of those days said that the Jews would be taken to forced labour.

On March 10, a delegation of Bitola Jews was received by the bishop, who generously promised that he would not let anything happen to them. The delegation was greeted by a large number of Jewish citizens who joyfully received the news.

By the German and Bulgarian fascist authorities, the deportation of Jews from Macedonia was organized in three stages:

- The first transport with Skopje Jews began on March 22, 1943.
- The second transport began on March 25 with part of Skopje Jews, all of Shtip Jews and a group of Bitola Jews.
- The third transport began on March 29 with about 2,500 people.

According to a secret report of the German consul in Skopje to the German legation in Sofia dated March 18, 1943, the local population fully welcomed the internment of the Jews.

After the liberation of Vardar Macedonia in 1944, the total number of surviving Jews, according to Society of Jewish Communities in Yugoslavia, was 419. Some sources state that the remnants of the Jewish community re-gathered in Belgrade, Serbia and only about 140 had survived. Most had survived by going into hiding or fighting with the Yugoslav, Jewish partisans. Of those transported to the death camps, nobody survived. Most survivors chose to immigrate to Israel, with some returning to North Macedonia, and others remaining in Serbia. As a result of this the number of Jews living in North Macedonia dropped to 81 in 1952.
