= Apio (appetizer) =

Balkan Jewish braised celery root and carrot dish

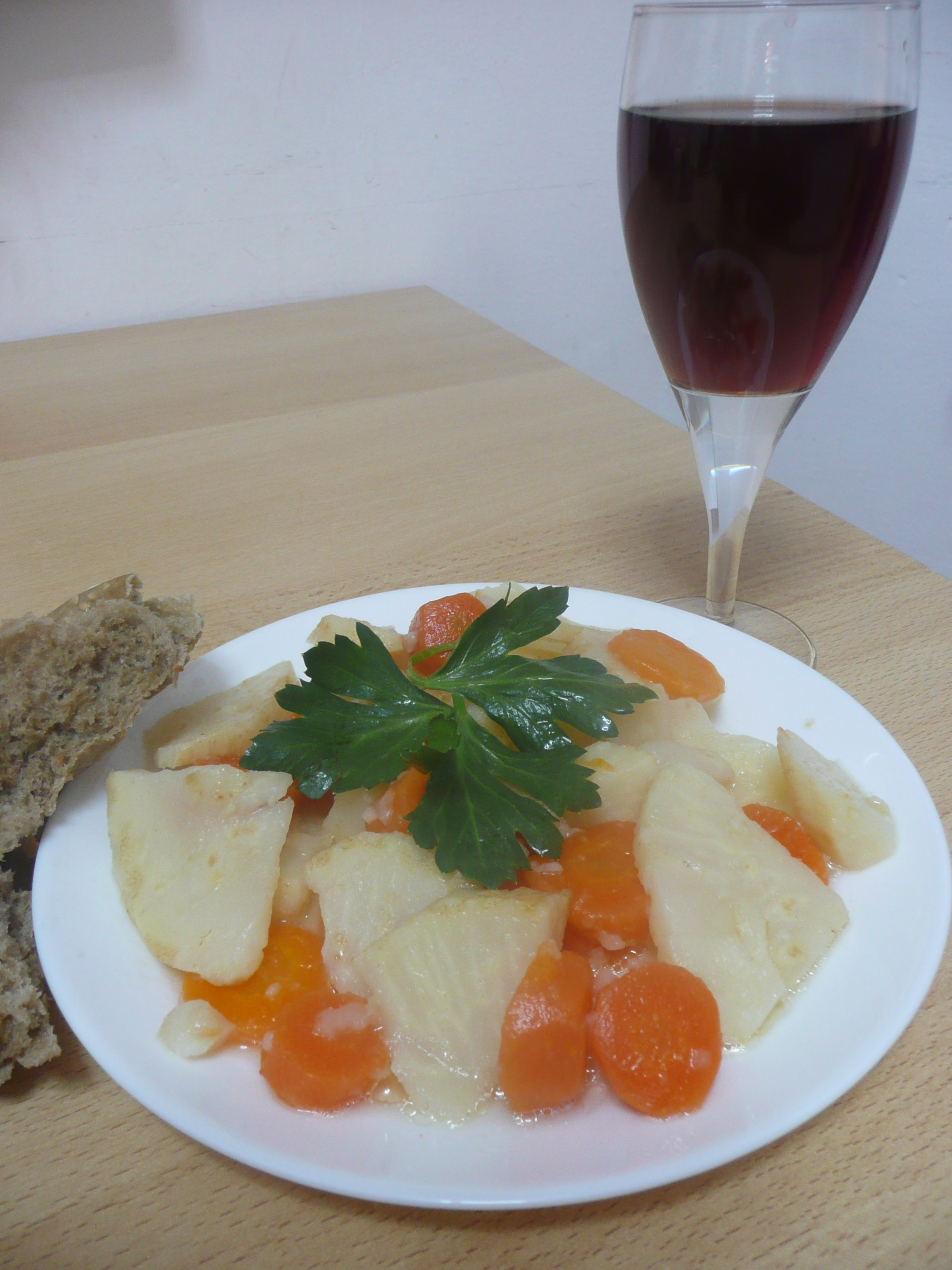
- Apio, garnished with parsley
- Alternative names: Apiu
- Type: Salatim
- Course: Salad
- Place of origin: Today: Israel, Jewish diaspora; historically: Jewish communities in the Balkans
- Region or state: Middle East
- Created by: Sephardic Jews
- Serving temperature: Cold
- Main ingredients: Celery root, carrots, lemon juice or vinegar, olive oil, kosher salt, parsley

Apio, also known as apiu, is a Balkan Jewish appetizer made from celeriac and carrot and served cold. It is customary to serve the appetizer on the three pilgrimage festivals before the ritual meals.

== Etymology ==
The word Apio is likely derived from the word Apium, which is the Spanish terminology for celery.

== History ==
During the 19th century, there was a significant decline in the economic situation of the Balkan Jews in general and the regions of Bulgaria and Macedonia in particular, which coincided with the end of the Ottoman Empire. The Jews lived in poverty and, as happened in many Jewish communities in Europe, purchased the most inexpensive and popular food products and so the food was based on the root of celery and carrots. The Balkan Jews who for many generations preserved the Ladino language called the appetizer after its main ingredient.

== Preparation ==
Apio is prepared by cooking slices of celery root and carrots in a variety of spices suitable for the purpose of the dish, usually herbs and lemon juice or vinegar.
