= Operation Animals =

Part of World War II in Greece

- Part of Operation Barclay
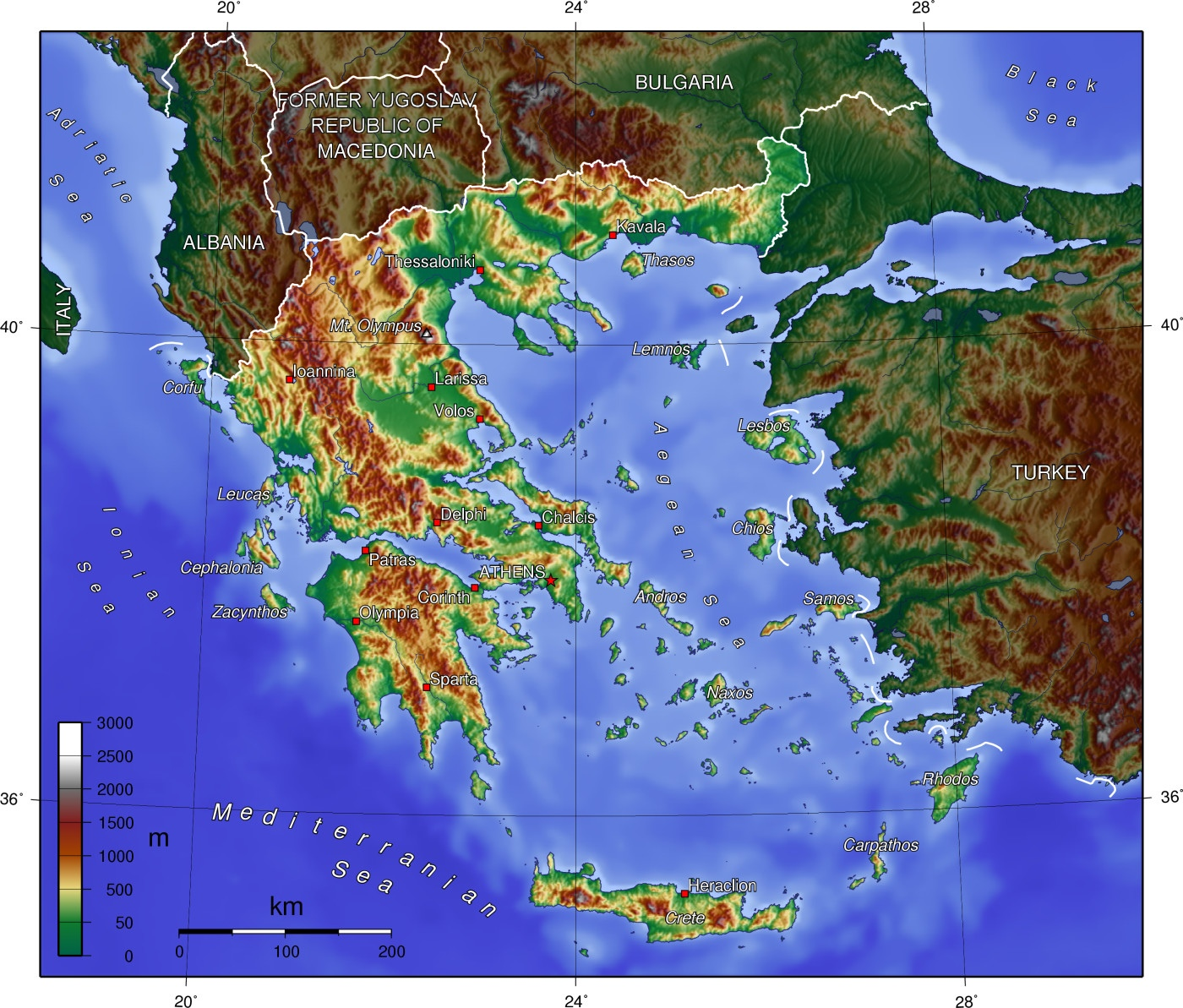
- Topographic map of Greece
Date	21 June – 11 July 1943
Location	Central/Northern Greece
Result	Allied victory

Belligerents
Germany; Italy; Hellenic State	United Kingdom; United States; ELAS; PAO; EDES; Organization Zeus

Commanders and leaders
Alexander Löhr; Georgios Poulos	Henry Wilson; Eddie Myers; Stefanos Sarafis; Napoleon Zervas

Units involved
Army Group E; • 117th Jäger Division; • 1st Mountain Division; Hellenic Gendarmerie; (Greece) Security Battalions; Poulos Verband	SOE; ELAS; PAO; Organization Zeus; USAAF

Casualties and losses
41 killed; 92 executed; 129 wounded; 22 airplanes destroyed; 15 airplanes damaged; 32 killed	165 executed; 16 villages destroyed

Operation Animals was a World War II mission by the British Special Operations Executive (SOE), in cooperation with the Greek Resistance groups ELAS, Zeus, EDES, PAO and the United States Army Air Force. The operation took place between 21 June and 11 July 1943 and included an organized campaign of sabotage in Greece, to deceive the Axis Powers into believing that Greece was the target of an Allied amphibious landing, instead of Sicily. Despite the mission's success, the Greek civilian population suffered from mass reprisals and British intervention into the internal affairs of the Greek resistance exacerbated the tensions between its various components.

== Background ==
On 28 October 1940, Italy began the Italo-Greek War, expecting a swift victory but the invasion failed and the Italians were pushed back into Albania. As the war dragged on into its sixth month, Germany was forced to intervene to support its struggling ally. The small Greek force defending the Greco–Bulgarian border was defeated by the better-equipped and numerically superior Germans. The German penetration deep into Greece made further resistance at the Albanian front pointless, ending the Battle of Greece in favor of the Axis Powers. The British subsequently conducted an evacuation and Greece was subjected to a Triple Occupation by Germany, Italy and Bulgaria. Unlike Italy and Germany, Bulgaria did not administer Eastern Macedonia and Thrace through Greek collaborators but annexed the area to form the province of Belomorie. The first resistance organization in Greece was founded in May 1941; Eleutheria (Liberty) was a common front ranging from communists to Venizelists. The group was short lived as internal political disagreements and the work of Axis intelligence services suppressed its activities and bands belonging to the communist-led Greek People's Liberation Army (ELAS), became the dominant resistance organization in the country. Right-wing resistance organizations such as National Republican Greek League (EDES), National and Social Liberation (EKKA) and Defenders of Northern Greece (YBE) played a much smaller role.

In June 1943, the head of the British Special Operations Executive mission in Greece, Brigadier Eddie Myers, conceived the Agreement of National Groups. Under the terms of the agreement, ELAS and the right-wing EDES and EKKA, united under a common general staff consisting of Myers and the leaders of the units, while also accepting the seniority of the British Middle East Command (General Henry Maitland Wilson). The accord was to pave the way for Operation Animals, part of Operation Barclay, a plan to deceive the Axis powers into believing that the Allied invasion of southern Europe would be in Greece and not Sicily. In late 1942, with on-going Allied success in the North African Campaign, the thoughts of the military planners turned to the next target. British planners considered that an invasion of France from Britain could not take place until 1944, and the Prime Minister, Winston Churchill, wanted to use the Allied forces from North Africa to attack Europe's "soft underbelly". There were two possible targets for the Allies to attack. The first option was Sicily; control of the island would open the Mediterranean Sea to Allied shipping and allow the invasion of continental Europe through Italy. The second option was into Greece and the Balkans, to trap the German forces present between the British and American invaders and the Soviets. (Note: American planners favoured either a cross-channel invasion into northern France in 1943, or to increase pressure in the Pacific War; Roosevelt was undecided on either of the two options, and was persuaded by Churchill to support the invasion of Sicily.) At the Casablanca Conference in January 1943 Allied planners agreed on the selection of Sicily – codenamed Operation Husky – and decided to undertake the invasion no later than July that year. There was concern among the Allied planners that Sicily was an obvious choice – Churchill is reputed to have said "Everyone but a bloody fool would know that it's Sicily" – and that the build-up of resources for the invasion would be detected.

Adolf Hitler was concerned about a Balkan invasion, as the area had been the source of raw materials for the German war industry, including copper, bauxite, chrome and oil. The Allies knew of Hitler's fears, and they launched Operation Barclay, a deception operation to play upon his concerns and to mislead the Germans into thinking the Balkans were the objective, thereby keeping Sicily less defended than it could have been. In doing so, the deception operation reinforced German strategic thinking about the likely British target. To suggest the eastern Mediterranean was the target, the Allies set up a headquarters in Cairo, Egypt, for a fictional formation, the Twelfth Army, consisting of twelve divisions. Military manoeuvres were conducted in Syria, with numbers inflated by dummy tanks and armoured vehicles to deceive observers. Greek interpreters were recruited and the Allies stockpiled Greek maps and currency. Falsified communications about troop movements were generated from the Twelfth Army headquarters, while the Allied command post in Tunis – which was to be the headquarters of the Sicily invasion – reduced radio traffic by using land-lines wherever possible.

On 29 May, Myers was informed by Cairo that Sicily was to be invaded in the second week of July and ordered that Greek resistance organizations were to commence Operation Animals a sabotage campaign throughout Greece. The operation was to begin on 21 June and last until 14 July and Myers immediately contacted local SOE agents and the leadership of ELAS, which agreed to participate in the operation. The strategically important Gorgopotamos bridge which had been destroyed during Operation Harling had been repaired and was to be blown again. Myers proposed to destroy the bridge across the river Asopos but the ELAS commander Stefanos Sarafis, thought it too dangerous and proposed to demolish the Kournovo tunnel; Myers eventually gave in and supplied ELAS with explosives. On the night of 1 June, an ELAS engineer unit, accompanied by 250 fighters, blew up the tunnel while a train loaded with ammunition and Italian soldiers on leave was passing through. About 200–300 Italians and seven Germans were killed while 100 more suffered burn injuries and 60 Greek prisoners of war perished in the explosions that followed. The tunnel suffered no serious damage and the Germans repaired the railroad tracks a week later. The Italian army conducted the reprisal killing of 106 prisoners of war in the Larissa concentration camp. On 20 June, in 'Operation Washing', a group of six SOE officers evaded German guards to scale a steep slope near the Asopos bridge, place explosives at its northern end and set them off. Upon hearing about the demolition, Adolf Hitler expressed his dissatisfaction with the level of protection of the Greek railroad network, while also acknowledging that such subversive acts could not be wholly avoided. The damage caused to the bridge severed the railroad connection between northern and southern Greece until 28 August and paved the way for Operation Animals.

== Operation ==
On the night of 20 June 1943, five bridges were blown up along the Katerini–Lamia railroad, destroying 4 km (2.5 mi) of tracks. In the area of Litochoro, a Macedonian ELAS unit eliminated a small garrison guarding the bridge and disarmed a Hellenic Gendarmerie patrol, before destroying the adjacent bridge. Another group blew up the bridge and cut the telephone line at the village of Petrana between Kozani and Servia. Animals then began in Macedonia; the Germans reinforced their garrisons and arrested hundreds of civilians and forced them to lift mines on the railroads, under threat of death. The civilians were to find explosives by poking about the tracks with sticks and then defuse them, which limited the scope of the Macedonian phase of the operation. In the early morning of 21 June, a column of the 117th Jäger Division was ambushed by a party of 100 ELAS fighters, while passing through the narrow Sarantaporo pass. In an eight-hour exchange of fire, 11 Germans were killed, 97 surrendered, and five escaped. The Sarantaporo bridge and the 64 cars and trucks belonging to the column were destroyed. The captured German soldiers were interrogated, and killed several days later.

Alexander Löhr's telegraphs of 22–23 June, describe a systematic campaign of sabotage against Greek telecommunications and transport networks and the monthly report of Army Group E for June echoed this, adding that the sabotage actions were intended to isolate the south of Greece. On the morning of 24 June, 20 American aircraft bombed the Thermi airfield, where 8 German soldiers were killed and 70 were injured. The runways and 70 percent of its facilities were destroyed along with 10 aircraft, while 15 more were damaged. Information on the airfield location were provided by the Zeus resistance organisation of Thessaloniki. On 24 June, the 1st Mountain Division was ordered to clear the Sarantaporo pass of any scrap and mines left behind and build a temporary bridge. On 25 June, German guards repelled an attack on the Bralos bridge, later defusing an explosive device. On the night of 28 June, eight charges were detonated along the Leptokarya–Litochoro railroad line, damaging it slightly. The following day, resistance fighters assassinated Adolf Ersfeld, the commander of the 621st Army Secret Police Unit, on the Thessaloniki–Edessa highway. On 27 June, Allied raids on the Eleusina and Kalamaki airfields killed 16 Germans and 32 Greeks, 59 people were injured and 12 aeroplanes destroyed.

On 1 July, the 1st Mountain Division and two Italian regiments enacted an anti–partisan operation in the vicinity of Servia and after their rendezvous, the operation was converted to a punitive expedition. The expedition lasted until 5 June and resulted in the burning of 16 villages, the killing of 92 civilians and the looting of large numbers of cattle. After the departure of the Mountain Division towards Ioannina, the area was declared a dead zone and placed under the control of collaborationists under the command of Georgios Poulos. On 2 July, 50 prisoners of war were executed at Vyrsodepseia in reprisal for Ersfeld's death and later in the day, resistance fighters skirmished with a German patrol at Platamonas. On 3 July, resistance fighters shot at a German car, wounding a passenger and blew up a railroad tracks outside Litochoro. On the night of 4 July, the Leptokarya–Litochoro railroad was sabotaged once more leading to the derailing of an ammunition train and in the ensuing explosion 10 Germans were wounded. At the same time a German outpost between Katerini and Pyrgetos was attacked. German reprisals led to the killing of 10 prisoners of war in Thessaloniki and the destruction of part of Litochoro. On the night of 11 July, a bridge was blown up 25 km (16 mi) north-west of Lamia as a German column passed through and 25 wagons of ammunition were destroyed. The following day Germans killed 13 people accused of carrying out the bombing. On 11 July, Myers ordered the cessation of the operation as the landings on Sicily had begun.

== Aftermath ==
Hitler had been deceived as to the real location of the Allied landing, believing that Sardinia and the Peloponnese were more likely to be the target. Following the landing at Sicily, the staff of Army Group E continued to expect a second landing in Greece for a short time, anticipating that the Greek resistance would act as a fifth column. Despite the success of the operation, Maitland Wilson admitted that the civilian population of Greece had suffered much in the German reprisals. This was partially due to inefficient planning by ELAS, which failed to provide the civilian population with adequate warning of German reprisals. Following the end of the operation Greece lost what little strategic importance it had in the Allied war effort.

Operation Animals fostered the expansion of right-wing resistance groups such as EDES and YBE to counterbalance the dominant ELAS. As part of this effort, the leadership of YBE agreed to embrace armed struggle, forming guerilla bands in rural areas. In July 1943, YBE was renamed Panhellenic Liberation Organization (PAO). The formation of PAO strained relations with ELAS and no effort was made to combine their operations. PAO managed to gain the support of the Turkish-speaking Pontic Greeks, who maintained independent resistance networks and were also anti-communist. In August, ELAS fighters in the area of Kilkis began pressuring PAO insurgents into disarming. When ELAS applied the same tactic on the Turkish-speaking Pontians, the latter murdered seven regional ELAS commanders in the village of Imera, near Kozani. By the end of the month the conflict between the two groups had escalated into a civil war, which continued until December. ELAS managed to destroy PAO's armed units, before they managed to regroup in Chalkidiki. Exploiting a mutiny within the Greek Armed Forces in the Middle East, ELAS also clashed with EKKA and EDES, in an effort to solidify its position before the anticipated return of king George II of Greece from exile, whom ELAS vehemently opposed.

In January 1944, the remnants of PAO, consisting of several hundred men, requested aid from the German authorities and they were reformed into collaborationist, counter-insurgency units. Under German direction, PAO took part in operations against ELAS, while attacking the Bulgarian army, with the tacit approval of the Germans. From then on PAO operated under the umbrella of the collaborationist Security Battalions, committing numerous atrocities. ELAS remained the dominant resistance organization in Greece until the end of the war. The Treaty of Varkiza significantly weakened the communists, while the Greek army and gendarmerie were reformed with former members of anti-communist resistance organizations, including ex-collaborators. The Greek Civil War continued until the communists were defeated in 1949.

== Footnotes ==
Notes

Citations
