= Battle of Sarantaporos (1943) =

ELAS guerrilla operation in Greece

- Part of Operation Animals
Date	21 June 1943
Location	Sarantaporos, central Greece 40°03′43″N 22°00′53″E
Result	Allied victory

Belligerents
Germany	ELAS; United Kingdom

Commanders and leaders
Esterbauer	Andreas Beserianos; Theodoros Alexandros; Apostolis Papakonstantinos; Mitsos Stamkos

Units involved
(Nazi Germany) 117th Jäger Division	16th ELAS Division (United Kingdom) SOE

Strength
108	Unknown

Casualties and losses
24 killed 79 captured (most later executed)	Unknown
- Location within Greece

The Battle of Sarantaporos on 21 June 1943 was a successful ambush by the guerrillas of the Greek People's Liberation Army (ELAS) against a column of the German 117th Jäger Division. The ambush, carried out as part of Operation Animals, was one of the most successful operations against the Germans during the Axis occupation of Greece.

== Background ==
In preparation for the Allied landings on Sicily in July 1943, the Allies engaged in a series of strategic deception operations, which aimed to convince the German high command that Greece was the actual target of the expected Allied invasion, notably 'Operation Mincemeat' in May 1943. In view of the increasingly declining combat value of the Italian occupation forces in Greece, however, the relocation of a number of high-value German divisions to Greece had already begun in the first months of 1943, including the 117th Jäger Division. Another operation, codenamed 'Operation Animals', was launched in Greece to accompany 'Mincemeat', involving frequent attacks by Greek guerrillas and SOE saboteurs on military and infrastructure targets throughout Greece. While the SOE officers were aware that no Allied landing in Greece was planned for now, the Greek guerrilla leaders were not informed of this; about 10,000 fighters were mobilized for the upcoming operations.

== Ambush at Sarantaporos ==
On 21 June 1943, the first day of 'Animals', men of the 16th Division of the Greek People's Liberation Army (ELAS) attacked a German supply convoy passing through the straits of Sarantaporos. As the coastal road was then impassable for heavy vehicles, this route was the main supply road between southern and northern Greece for truckborne traffic.

The ELAS men, under the direction of two British officers (codenamed 'Mike' and 'Chris'), had planted remote-controlled explosives at the pass on the previous day on two places, at a distance of about 1500 meters. Command was held by the former army lieutenant Andreas Beserianos, the kapetanioi Theodoros Alexandros and Apostolis Papakonstantinos, and the political representative of the National Liberation Front (EAM), the parent organization of ELAS, Mitsos Stamkos. The target of the ambush was a column coming from Bulgaria and heading to the Peloponnese. It comprised 36 trucks and 46 other vehicles, crewed by 108 men of the 117th Jäger Division under a Lieutenant Esterbauer. No additional escort was provided.

Shortly after the German column entered the pass around 9:30, the explosives on both ends of the column were detonated, and the attack began. Many of the trucks, laden with ammunition and fuel, exploded, while the panicked Germans sometimes abandoned their weapons trying to flee. Only five Germans managed to escape; the rest were either killed in action or taken prisoner, only to be executed by ELAS after the battle. All vehicles were destroyed.

The exact details of what happened to the surrendered Germans are difficult to reconstruct, but it appears that 79 men were taken prisoner in the afternoon of 21 June. They were taken to the headquarters of the 1st Division of ELAS at Kastania, where some of them volunteered to join ELAS. The rest were taken to the nearby village of Doliana and imprisoned in the local monastery of Ypsosis Timiou Stavrou. Sources report some attempts by ELAS at arranging a prisoner exchange, but the details are sketchy and based largely on hearsay. Most of the remaining Germans were executed on 13 July, their bodies thrown down a cliff.

== Aftermath ==
The ambush at Sarantaporos coincided with the sabotage action against the Asopos Bridge, and the slightly earlier Destruction of the Kournovo Tunnel. The effect of these attacks (and of 'Animals' in general) is disputed: post-war memoirs generally claim that it was successful, and Hitler did indeed order his Commander-in-Chief Southeast, Alexander Löhr, to accelerate the deployment of divisions to Greece. At the same time, the German divisions had been arriving in Greece as part of a scheduled process that had begun after the end of the Tunisian campaign, and that also had to do with the expected defection of Italy (and the preparation for the Germans' own 'Operation Achse'). Indeed, the local German command (Army Group E) estimated the sudden upsurge of guerrilla activity as a sign that the invasion would not take place in Greece.

== Sources ==
- Dreidoppel, Kaspar (2009). Der griechische Dämon: Widerstand und Bürgerkrieg im besetzten Griechenland 1941-1944 [The Greek Demon: Resistance and Civil War in Occupied Greece 1941–1944] (in German). Wiesbaden: Otto Harrassowitz. ISBN 978-3-44705929-9.
- Fleischer, Hagen (2020). Krieg und Nachkrieg: Das schwierige deutsch-griechische Jahrhundert [War and Post-War: The Difficult German–Greek Century] (in German). Cologne: Vandenhoeck & Ruprecht. ISBN 978-341251790-8.
- Grigoriadis, Solon (1982). Συνοπτική Ιστορία της Εθνικής Αντίστασης, 1941–1944 [Concise History of the National Resistance, 1941–1944] (in Greek). Athens: Kapopoulos. OCLC 165816421.
- Meyer, Hermann Frank (2009). Von Wien nach Kalavryta: Die blutige Spur der 117. Jäger-Division durch Serbien und Griechenland [From Vienna to Kalavryta: The Bloody Trail of the 117th Jäger Division Across Serbia and Greece] (in German). Mannheim: Bibliopolis. ISBN 978-3-941336-10-0.
- Richter, Heinz A. (2012). Griechenland 1940-1950: Die Zeit der Bürgerkriege [Greece 1940–1950: The Era of Civil Wars] (in German). Mainz: Franz Philipp Rutzen. ISBN 978-3-44706704-1.
