= Donald Stott =

New Zealand soldier (1914–1945)

Donald John Stott
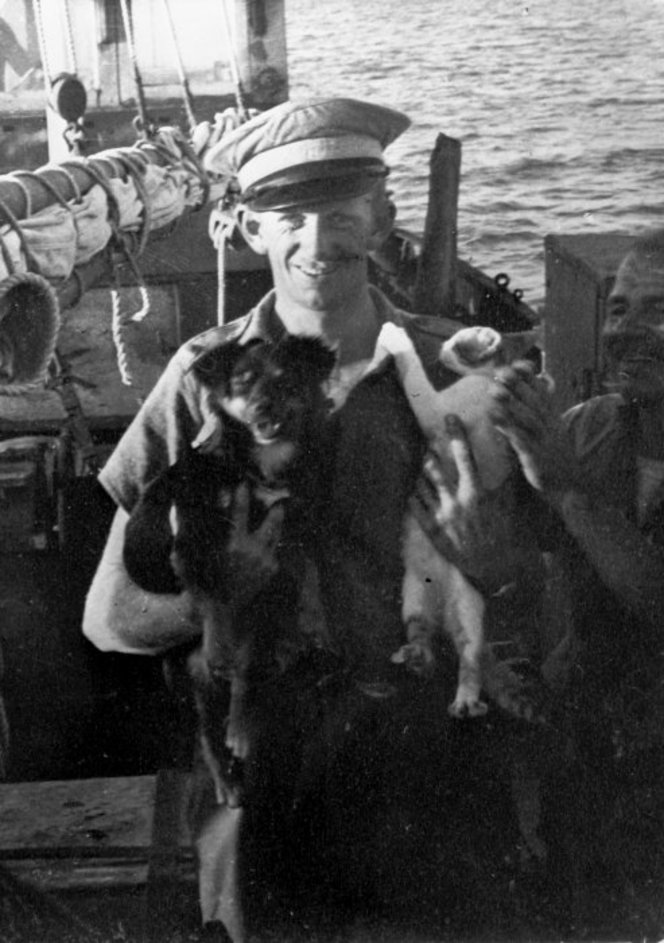
- Stott aboard a ship in the Mediterranean during his time with SOE in Greece
- Born: 23 October 1914; Birkenhead, New Zealand
- Died: 20 March 1945 (aged 30); Balikpapan Bay, Borneo
- Military career
- Allegiance: New Zealand
- Service years: 1939–1945
- Rank: Major
- Units: 5th Field Regiment, Royal New Zealand Artillery; Special Operations Executive; Z Special Unit
- Commands: Robin 1
- Conflicts: Second World War; Battle of Greece; Battle of Crete
- Awards: Distinguished Service Order & Bar

Major Donald John Stott, DSO & Bar (23 October 1914 – 20 March 1945) was a New Zealand soldier and military intelligence agent during the Second World War. Born in Auckland, Stott volunteered for the 2nd New Zealand Expeditionary Force shortly after the outbreak of the Second World War. Serving with an artillery unit, Stott took part in the Battle of Greece, and the subsequent Battle of Crete. Captured by the Germans on Crete, he successfully escaped from a prisoner of war camp after several months of internment.

Making his way back to Egypt, he joined the Special Operations Executive in 1942 and was dispatched to Greece to support the local resistance efforts against the Germans. In 1944, he transferred to the Z Special Unit, which was based in Melbourne, Australia as part of the Services Reconnaissance Department. Appointed commander of Robin 1, a small team formed to collect intelligence in the Southwest Pacific, he disappeared, presumed drowned, on 20 March 1945 while leading his team on a reconnaissance mission to Balikpapan Bay, Indonesia.

== Early life ==
Born on 23 October 1914, Stott was the son of a butcher in Birkenhead in Auckland. Educated at Northcote Primary School and then at Takapuna Grammar School, Stott was a keen sportsman. Upon finishing his education, he was employed at the New Zealand Herald as a rotary machinist.

== Second World War ==
Following the outbreak of the Second World War, Stott enlisted in the New Zealand Military Forces in December 1939 and volunteered for the 2nd New Zealand Expeditionary Force (2NZEF). Posted to 5th Field Regiment, Royal New Zealand Artillery, he was quickly promoted to sergeant. In 1940, he embarked with the 2nd Echelon of the 2nd Division, which had been formed from the personnel of the 2NZEF, for Egypt. However, during transit the ship on which he was traveling, the Aquitania, was diverted to England.

In March 1941, Stott was shipped with the 2nd Echelon to Egypt to join up with the 1st Echelon of the 2nd Division, which had been in the country since February 1940, and then onto Greece to take part in the defence of Greece. The New Zealanders, together with other Allied forces, were forced to retreat to the island of Crete following the German invasion of Greece. He was wounded and captured during the subsequent Battle of Crete.

Stott described the wound in a letter home as being '"not at all severe. I was hit by a bullet just above the knee (right) on the inside of the leg and it did not strike a bone so I was lucky", and it was not so serious as to prevent him escaping a prisoner of war camp in Greece. Together with another New Zealander, Bob Morton, Stott vaulted the fence of the camp in broad daylight and successfully evaded the German guards with the help of Greek police who led the pursuing Germans astray. After spending several months in and around Athens, Stott and Morton were eventually able to get to Egypt, crossing the Mediterranean by sailboat.

=== Special Operations Executive ===
Following recuperation from his adventures in Greece, Stott was posted to Officer Training School (OTC). It was during his time at OTC that he was asked to conduct sabotage missions in Greece for the Special Operations Executive (SOE), a request he gladly accepted. However, Stott, by now commissioned as an officer, initially began working for SOE at Bardia in Egypt, dealing with POWs who had escaped from Crete. In July 1942, he was part of the Post Occupational Force and, as the Allied situation in Egypt deteriorated, was tasked with the destruction of key facilities in the event German forces advance further.

==== Greece ====
Stott, increasingly frustrated that he had yet to reach Greece, sought a new role at SOE and was give charge of the Greek Section in the organisation. With his fellow escapee, Bob Morton, he carried out some reconnaissance missions in North Africa and some islands off the coast of Greece, returning to Egypt each time. In March 1943, he, along with another SOE operative, Geoffrey Gordon-Creed, were parachuted into Greece. They were to join the British Military Mission that was then based in Greece and co-ordinate the Greek resistance efforts.

In June 1943, Stott, together with Gordon-Creed, destroyed the Asopos Viaduct ("Operation Washing"). This was an important operation, as it resulted in the diversion of German troops destined for the frontlines to occupation duties in Greece. For his exploits, Stott was awarded a Distinguished Service Order (DSO), after the commander of the British Military Mission in Greece, Brigadier Eddie Myers originally recommended Stott for a Victoria Cross (VC). Myers considered that the VC would have been awarded had a shot been fired during the Asopos mission. Remaining in Greece and continuing his sabotage operations, Stott received a head wound when blowing up a bridge and was forced seek medical help from acquaintances in Athens.

Now based in Athens and tasked with the sabotage of aerodromes around the capital, Stott was able to get the various factions of the Greek resistance to work together. The main resistance groups in Greece were the EDES, a rightist resistance group and the communist controlled Greek People's Liberation Army (ELAS), the military wing of the National Liberation Front (Ethnikó Apeleftherotikó Métopo or EAM). However, his relations with EAM became very difficult as he accused the group of seeking to hinder his work, describing his EAM liaison as "violently Bolshevistic and anti-British". Stott pressured all of the non-communist resistance groups to work together to prevent EAM from coming to power after the war, promising them arms and money. The planned sabotage operations came to nothing as it was realised the targeted aerodromes were too well defended. His efforts to co-ordinate the Greek resistance meant that Stott became embroiled in the internal power struggle between the various Greek resistance groups. Reputedly a staunch anti-communist, Stott favoured working with the EDES rather than ELAS. Greek SOE operatives became concerned that Stott was being manipulated by his EDES contacts, some of whom were of questionable character.

Many of the Greek officers Stott met were ethnikophron ("nationally-minded"), a Greek expression meaning someone with ultra-nationalist views. One of Stott's principle contacts was Colonel Georgios Grivas of Organization X, a Cypriot-born Greek army officer of extreme right-wing views. Many of the ethnikophron officers Stott met, such as Grivas, had links with both the puppet Hellenic State governed by Ioannis Rallis and the Germans. Moreover, in the Athens, among the ethnikophron officers, there was what the British historian Mark Mazower called a "murky" world where those who professed to be engaged in resistance could just as easily be engaged in collaboration with the Germans under the grounds that EAM constituted a greater threat. Many members of the Athens branch of EDES joined the Security Battalions, which supported the German occupation.

=== Talks with German officials ===
Matters came to a head in November 1943, when the mayor of Athens contacted Stott with back channel peace overtures from the Germans. While the approach was initially dismissed, Stott decided to explore the opportunity in order to collect useful intelligence on Germany's position in Greece. He arrived in Athens and met with senior Geheime Feldpolizei officer Roman Loos on 4 November. The meeting went well, and Loos declared afterwards that Stott could travel around Greece openly. In message he sent to the SOE headquarters in Cairo three days later, Stott described meeting Loos, whom he called "Loss" and mistakenly described as "the Gestapo chief of the Balkans", saying that Loos had direct contact with Adolf Hitler. Stott proceeded to asked the Germans to arrange for the Security Battalions to switch sides and serve the Greek government-in-exile when it returned to Greece, asserting that his government did not want EAM to come to power under any conditions.

However, one of Stott's Greek contacts denounced him to the SOE headquarters in Cairo, charging that he was engaged in treasonous talks. Stott's talks with the Germans had a disastrous impact on Britain's relations with EAM, who believed that he was acting under orders from London. On 8 November, the SOE headquarters in Cairo sent Stott a message stating under no conditions were SOE agents to negotiate with the Germans, ordering him to break off his talks immediately. Stott was later denounced as "rogue agent" acting without orders, and his superior, Brigadier Keble, was fired. The Germans allowed Stott to leave Athens for Cairo in late November 1943 with a message from Loos indicating a desire to explore the possibility of peace in Greece but this was promptly dismissed. Following a debriefing held in Cairo, Stott was awarded a bar to his DSO as a result of the useful intelligence he collected during the negotiations. Sir Reginald Leeper, the British ambassador to the Greek government-in-exile whose relations with the SOE were very difficult, demanded that Stott be banned from Greece permanently.

==== Z Special Unit ====
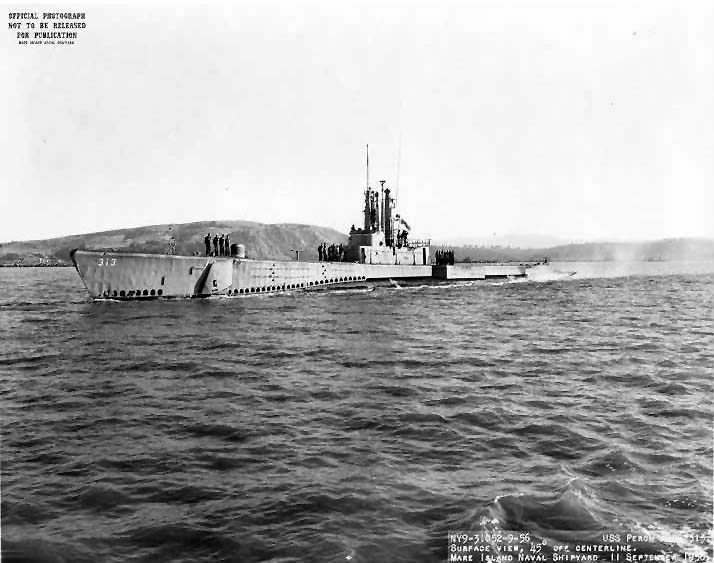
The USS Perch, from which Stott launched his final mission

Stott was not allowed to return to Greece following his recent exploits in the country. Instead, after being offered a staff job which was declined, he opted to be seconded to the Australian equivalent of the SOE, the Services Reconnaissance Department, to undertake operations in the Far East. Stott briefly returned to New Zealand where he married Mary Snow in June 1944.

The following month, Stott commenced intensive training at various bases around Australia, including receiving instructions in small boat handling and submarine insertion. In 1945, and by now promoted to major, he was appointed commander of Operation Robin 1 and tasked with conducting sabotage and intelligence missions in Southeast Borneo. A submarine, the USS Perch, transported Stott and his twelve-man team to Japanese occupied Balikpapan Bay. Arriving in the bay on 20 March 1945, Stott was to lead an initial party of four ashore in a pair of two-man folboats. This was to be followed by the remainder of his team two days later.

Launching at night in heavy swells, Stott had trouble with the motor of his folboat, and he and his companion were forced to use paddles to try to get to shore. En route, the party was detected by the Japanese and were ordered by Stott to seek an alternative landing site. While the second folboat successfully made it to shore, Stott and his companion were never seen again, and were presumed to have drowned.
