= Apio (surname) =

Apio is a surname. Notable people with the surname include:

- Joyce Apio (born 1996), Ugandan cricketer
- Kermet Apio, American stand-up comedian
