= Operation Barclay =

World War II deception operation in support of the Allied invasion of Sicily in 1943

Operation Barclay was a World War II deception by the Allies in support of Operation Husky, the Allied invasion of Sicily in July 1943.

The goal was to deceive the Axis powers as to the location of the Allies' assault across the Mediterranean and to divert the Axis military command's attention and resources. Operation Barclay used bogus troop movements, radio traffic, recruitment of Greek interpreters, and acquisition of Greek maps to indicate an invasion through the Balkans.

Operation Barclay created a sham army in the eastern Mediterranean: the Twelfth Army consisting of 12 fictitious divisions. Adolf Hitler suspected that the Allies would invade Europe through the Balkans, and Barclay served to reinforce this.

As part of Barclay the British also launched Operation Mincemeat, where faked documents were planted via Spain, and Operation Waterfall, in which a decoy invasion force was assembled in Cyrenaica. To reinforce the impression that an Allied invasion was imminent the Special Operations Executive (SOE), in co-operation with the Greek andartes, mounted Operation Animals, a series of attacks on rail and road networks.

The deception was successful. The German High Command concluded there was a greater concentration of Allied forces in the eastern Mediterranean than was the case and held to this assessment, making subsequent deceptions more credible. German forces in the Balkans were reinforced from 8 to 18 divisions, and the Italian fleet was diverted into the Adriatic Sea. The Allied invasion of Sicily thus achieved total surprise.

The greatly increased number of German occupying forces in Greece and whole Balkans resulted in negative consequences for the Greek Resistance and Yugoslav Resistance. Wide-ranging counterguerrilla operations were carried out, culminating in mass reprisals such as the Massacre of Kalavryta and the Distomo massacre.
