= Operation Waterfall =

Operation Waterfall was part of Operation Barclay, which was a deception to try to trick the Germans into thinking the Allies would land elsewhere in the Mediterranean other than Sicily, where they were going to land. It involved creating a decoy army in the eastern Mediterranean to make it look like they were targeting the Balkans. The Anglo-American force also created some dummy inflatable tanks and vehicles.

== See also ==
- Operation Bodyguard
- Operation Mincemeat
