= Operation Washing =

Destruction Operation

Coordinates: 38°47′01″N 22°25′57″E

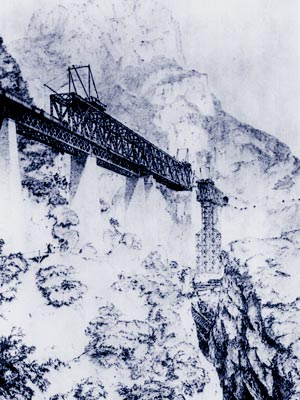
The Asopos viaduct being rebuilt, October 1944

Operation Washing was the successful destruction of the railway bridge over the Asopos River in Central Greece by four British SOE saboteurs. It took place on 21 June 1943, as part of Operation Animals. The British agents included Geoffrey Gordon-Creed and New Zealander Donald Stott. This was detailed in the book Rogue Male by Roger Field. In 1943, British forces planned a daring mission to destroy the heavily guarded Asopos viaduct in Greece, aiming to disrupt German railway communications. The mission, led by Captain Gordon-Creed and a small team, would prove to be a remarkable feat of sabotage.

== Background and planning ==
The Asopos viaduct was one of three key bridges in Greece vital to German supply lines. In 1942, a British sabotage mission targeted the Gorgopotamos viaduct, but Asopos remained a priority for destruction. In May 1943, Brigadier Myers ordered its elimination. Captain Edmonds led the operation, supported by Greek partisans and New Zealand soldiers, including Lieutenant Don Stott and Sergeant Bob Morton, who were known for their resilience in special operations. Edmonds set up headquarters in Anatoli, a remote village strategically located for covert activities. From there, they conducted reconnaissance, making plans for Operation "Washing" to cripple German supply lines.

== The challenges of the Asopos gorge ==
The Asopos viaduct was an imposing structure, spanning a sheer gorge and guarded by a heavily fortified position. Despite the risks, Edmonds and his team, including sapper officers like Gordon-Creed and Stott, were determined to succeed. However, their first attempt to infiltrate the gorge in early June met with extreme difficulties. The team struggled against freezing waters, sheer cliffs, and multiple waterfalls, lacking the necessary equipment. Exhausted and demoralized, they returned to regroup. While waiting for reinforcements and additional supplies, the team participated in Operation ANIMALS, which was designed to divert German attention ahead of the Allied invasion of Sicily. Morton, who had been assigned a separate mission, missed the final attempt.

== The final attempt ==
On June 15, Stott, Mutch, and Khouri set out with the necessary equipment for the final assault. They navigated the treacherous gorge, felled a tree to create a makeshift bridge over a waterfall, and fought through freezing waters. After days of struggle, Stott finally spotted the Asopos viaduct just 100 yards ahead. Observing German workers reinforcing the structure, he quickly retreated and sent a message to Edmonds, informing him that access to the viaduct was feasible via workers' steps carved into the cliffside. Encouraged by this success, Edmonds immediately dispatched the rest of the team to join them.

== Setting the charges ==
On June 18, the team, now complete with Scott and McIntyre, made their way under the viaduct. They worked silently and swiftly, aware that any noise could alert the guards. The tension was palpable, as even the smallest sound seemed amplified in the stillness. At one point, a loose rivet fell, torturing the men as it clattered down. A searchlight swept across the area, and they held their breath, barely avoiding detection. After two hours of meticulous work, the explosives were set. Multiple failsafes ensured that the charges would go off as planned. The "time pencils," which triggered the explosion, were crushed, initiating a timed detonation. The men then quickly descended and began their climb back up the gorge, anxious about the impending explosion.

== The climb and the explosion ==
The climb was grueling. Exhausted and freezing, the men pushed their bodies to the limit, knowing they had little time to escape. They checked their watches constantly, but the hours dragged on, with no explosion in sight. The time limit approached, but still, nothing happened. The men questioned whether something had gone wrong. However, after nearly two hours of uncertainty, a bright flash lit up the gorge, confirming the success of the mission. Though the roar of the stream drowned out any sound, the men knew the viaduct had been destroyed.

== Aftermath and recognition ==
The following morning, Stott confirmed the success of the mission from his vantage point on the northern cliff, where he saw the Germans in disarray. Initially, they suspected the sabotage was an internal error, and several guards were executed. It wasn’t until five days later, when a rope ladder made of parachute cord was found, that the Germans realized they had been attacked by saboteurs. The German attempt to rebuild the viaduct was disastrous. An engineer brought in to supervise the reconstruction oversaw the building of a new structure. However, when the framework was being connected, the entire structure collapsed, killing the engineer and many of his workers.

== Awards and recognition ==
In the aftermath of the mission, Captain Edmonds filed detailed reports to ensure the team received recognition for their extraordinary efforts. While Brigadier Myers initially recommended Stott for the Distinguished Service Order (DSO), he later revised his recommendation for a Victoria Cross (VC) after learning more about Stott’s role. Ultimately, Stott was awarded the DSO, while Gordon-Creed also received the DSO. Scott and McIntyre were awarded the Military Cross (MC), Mutch received the Military Medal (MM), and Khouri was awarded the bar to his MM. The demolition of the Asopos viaduct became one of the most celebrated acts of sabotage during the war, exemplifying the bravery and ingenuity of the soldiers involved.

== Sources ==
- Field, Roger; Gordon-Creed, Geoffrey (2011). Rogue Male: Death and Seduction in World War II with Geoffrey Gordon-Creed. Coronet. ISBN 978-1-4447-0633-8.
- Meyer, Hermann Frank (2009). Von Wien nach Kalavryta: Die blutige Spur der 117. Jäger-Division durch Serbien und Griechenland [From Vienna to Kalavryta: The Bloody Trail of the 117th Jäger Division Across Serbia and Greece] (in German). Mannheim: Bibliopolis. ISBN 978-3-941336-10-0.
