= Balkan Jews =

Balkan Jews refers to Jews who live or lived in the Balkan region of Europe.

== History ==
The Jewish communities of the Balkans were some of the oldest in Europe and date back to antiquity. The oldest communities of Jews in the port cities of the Balkans date back to the 4th century B.C during the reign of Alexander the Great in what would become North Macedonia. Communities continued to form in Dalmatia, Slavonia, and Serbia from the 1st century A.D., partially as a result of the First Jewish–Roman War violently put down by Emperor Titus. In the medieval ages, Jews were recorded as living in Ljubljana in 1213, in Rijeka in 1346, and in Split in 1397. These older Jewish communities predated the arrival of Sephardi Jews and merged with the newer populations that came from Spain and Portugal. Most Jews arrived in the Balkans in the 1490s after the Spanish Inquisition. Many Ashkenazi Jews also came to the Balkans in the 1400s because of persecution in northern European countries.

=== Byzantine Rule ===
As with the majority of Jewish communities throughout history and the world, the safety of the Balkan Jews to practice their religion was set by local governments. In the seventh century, when Avars (Caucasus) attacked Split, Croatia, the Diocletian's Palace gave Jews sanctuary.

=== Ottoman Rule ===
Although being classified as second class citizens along with Catholics, Roma, and Slavs, under nearly four centuries of Ottoman rule, the Jewish communities of the Balkans, considered an Eastern Sephardic heartland, had a stronger sense of communal organization and unity than other groups (i.e. North Africa) that helped maintain a sense of ethno-religious identity. The Jews, Muslims, and other religious minorities were exempt from the "Child Tax" which conscripted young Christian boys, brought them to Istanbul, educating them into a military force.

During this era, Salonika (Thessaloniki in Modern Greece) was widely seen as a refuge for Iberian Jews following their expulsion by the Spanish Inquisition, from the fifteenth all the way to the twentieth century.

=== World War II ===
The Jewish communities in the Balkans suffered immensely during World War II, and the vast majority were killed during the Holocaust. A brief overview on individual countries is below.

==== Croatia & Bosnia ====
The Jewish population of Croatia on the eve of World War II was approximately 25,000. Between the World Wars, Croatian nationalists, calling themselves Ustaše, the Insurgents. The movement emphasized the need for a racially "pure" Croatia and promoted genocide against Serbs, Jews and Roma via Nazi racial theories. Its members murdered hundreds of thousands of Serbs, Jews, and Roma as well as political dissidents in Yugoslavia during World War II.

In 1941 the Ustaše took control of Croatia and acquired Bosnia from Germany, implementing the racial policy of Nazi Germany within its territory. They made Jews wear a yellow star on their clothing, confiscated property, and, among other requirements, closed and destroyed the synagogue in Zagreb. Between October 1941 and April 1942, Ustaše filmed themselves demolishing the building. They later destroyed most of the films as well.

Through village massacres, pogroms, and the establishment of Jasenovac concentration camp, Europe's fourth largest concentration camp complex, the Ustaše murdered 85% of Jews living in Croatia and Bosnia.

==== Serbia ====
German occupied Serbia followed in step with Croatia, establishing concentration camps and extermination policies with the assistance of the puppet government of Milan Nedić.

The Nazi genocide against Yugoslav Jews began in April 1941. The main race laws in the State of Serbia were adopted on 30 April 1941: the Legal Decree on Racial Origins (Serbian: Zakonska odredba o rasnoj pripadnosti). Jews from Syrmia were sent to Croatian camps, as were many Jews from other parts of Serbia. In Serbia, Germans proceeded to round up Jews of Banat and Belgrade, setting up a concentration camp across the river Sava, in the Syrmian part of Belgrade, then given to Independent State of Croatia, the Sajmište concentration camp was established to process and eliminate the captured Jews and Serbs. As a result, then SS-Standartenführer Emanuel Schäfer, the commander of the security police (SiPo) and SD in Serbia, famously cabled Berlin after the last Jews were killed in May 1942:

"Serbien ist judenfrei." "Serbia is free of Jews"

Similarly, SS-Gruppenführer Harald Turner, the chief of the military administration staff in Serbia, stated in 1942 that:

"Serbia is the only country in which the Jewish question and the Gypsy question has been solved."

By the time Serbia and Yugoslavia were liberated in 1944, most of the Serbian Jewry had been murdered. Of the 82,500 Jews of Yugoslavia alive in 1941, only 14,000 (17%) survived the Holocaust. Of the Jewish population of 16,000 in the territory controlled by Nazi puppet government of Milan Nedić, police and secret services murdered approximately 14,500.

===== Hungary =====
There was a similar persecution of Jews in the territory of present-day Vojvodina, which was annexed by Hungary. In the 1942 raid in Novi Sad, the Hungarian troops killed many Jewish and non-Jewish Serb civilians in Bačka.

Historian Christopher Browning who attended the conference on the subject of Holocaust and Serbian involvement stated:

"Serbia was the only country outside Poland and the Soviet Union where all Jewish victims were killed on the spot without deportation, and was the first country after Estonia to be declared "Judenfrei", a term used by the Nazis during the Holocaust to denote an area free of all Jews."

Serbian civilians were involved in saving thousands of Yugoslavian Jews during this period. Miriam Steiner-Aviezer, a researcher into Yugoslavian Jewry and a member of Yad Vashem's Righteous Gentiles committee states that in World War II, "The Serbs saved many Jews." As of 2016, Yad Vashem recognizes 131 Serbians as Righteous Among the Nations, the highest number among Balkan countries.

==== Bulgaria ====
Bulgaria, who granted Jews full citizenship in 1880, who was part of the axis powers, tried to give over Bulgarian Jews to the Germans in exchange for its old territories like Thrace or North Macedonia but was met with strong popular resistance. Nevertheless, Bulgaria sent thousands of Jews from the occupied territories to Nazi concentration camps before the Bulgarians understood what the state was doing. After the war, state propaganda propagated the idea that Tsar Boris III opposed Adolf Hitler and refused to send over the Jews when he was actually the one responsible.

=== Post World War II ===
Almost all of the few survivors have emigrated to the (then) newly founded state of Israel and elsewhere.

==== Socialist Yugoslavia ====
The Federation of Jewish Communities in Yugoslavia was formed in the aftermath of World War II to coordinate the Jewish communities of post-war Yugoslavia and to lobby for the right of Jews to immigrate to Israel. More than half of Yugoslav survivors chose to immigrate to Israel after World War II.

The Jewish community of Serbia, and indeed of all constituent republics in Yugoslavia, was maintained by the unifying power of the Federation of Jewish Communities in Yugoslavia. However, this power ended with the breakup of Yugoslavia in the 1990s.

Almost no Balkan country today has a significant Jewish community.

== Culture ==
The Dubrovnik Synagogue is Europe's second oldest synagogue, also the oldest still in use, established in 1352 in what was then the Jewish ghetto.

The synagogue in Zagreb was completed in 1867 created in the Moorish architecture style, but destroyed between October 1941 and April 1942.

The Balkan Jews were Sephardi Jews, except in Croatia and Slovenia, where the Jewish communities were mainly Ashkenazi Jews. In Bosnia and Herzegovina, the small and close-knit Jewish community is 90% Sephardic, and Ladino is still spoken among the elderly. The Sephardi Jewish cemetery in Sarajevo has tombstones of a unique shape and inscribed in ancient Ladino. Sephardi Jews used to have a large presence in the city of Thessaloniki, and by 1900, some 80,000, or more than half of the population, were Jews.

Ivo Andrić's book The Bridge on the Drina focuses on a multi-ethnic Bosnian town under the rule of the Ottoman Empire. Belgrade Synagogue is currently the only fully active Jewish place of worship in Serbian capital Belgrade, created since at least 1521.

In Bosnia and Herzegovina, there is only one functioning synagogue, which was rebuilt after World War II, and it is the center of Bosnian Jewish communal life. Four other synagogue buildings exist, one of which serves as the Jewish Museum.

== See also ==
- Eastern Sephardim
- History of the Jews in Albania
- History of the Jews in Bosnia and Herzegovina
- History of the Jews in Bulgaria
- History of the Jews in Croatia
- History of the Jews in Greece
- History of the Jews in Italy
- History of the Jews in Kosovo
- History of the Jews in Monastir
- History of the Jews in Montenegro
- History of the Jews in North Macedonia
- History of the Jews in the Ottoman Empire
- History of the Jews in Romania
- History of the Jews in Serbia
- History of the Jews in Slovenia
- History of the Jews in Turkey
