= Geoffrey Gordon-Creed =

British Army officer and Special Operations Executive operative

Geoffrey Anthony Gordon-Creed DSO MC (born Harrison; January 29, 1920 – November 26, 2002) was a British Army officer and Special Operations Executive (SOE) operative renowned for his daring missions during World War II. He was awarded the Distinguished Service Order (DSO) and the Military Cross (MC) for his valor in combat.

== Early life and education ==
Born in Cape Town, South Africa, Gordon-Creed was the son of Wilbur Frederick Harrison and Mary Aurelia Creed. After attending a preparatory school in Kenya, he was educated at Downside School in England, where he excelled in rugby, playing for the first XV. He later changed his surname to Gordon-Creed by deed poll.

== Military career ==
In November 1940, Gordon-Creed was commissioned into the 2nd Battalion, Royal Gloucestershire Hussars. He saw action in North Africa as part of the 7th Armoured Division. On November 19, 1941, during the Battle of Bir el Gubi, he led his troop against the Italian Ariete Armoured Division, destroying two enemy tanks at close range before his own tank was hit. Despite sustaining injuries and his tank being disabled, he managed to rescue his wounded crew under heavy fire and return to Allied lines. For his gallantry, he was awarded the Military Cross

After multiple engagements where he was forced to abandon damaged tanks, Gordon-Creed joined the Special Air Service (SAS) and participated in raids behind enemy lines. His proficiency in unconventional warfare led to his recruitment by the SOE.

== Operations in Greece ==
In March 1943, Gordon-Creed parachuted into occupied Greece to establish resistance networks and conduct sabotage operations. One of his most notable missions was the destruction of the Asopos viaduct on June 21, 1943. This strategic railway bridge was crucial for German supply lines between Salonika and Athens. Leading a small team, he infiltrated the heavily guarded structure, set explosive charges, and successfully demolished the viaduct, significantly disrupting German troop movements. Winston Churchill later noted that this act diverted German divisions from other fronts. Gordon-Creed was awarded an immediate DSO for this operation.

== Later war service ==
After 15 months of clandestine operations in Greece, and with a substantial bounty on his head, Gordon-Creed was extracted to Turkey in June 1944. He then returned to England and was assigned to SOE operations in Belgium, focusing on counter-intelligence. At the war's end, he served as head of counter-intelligence for German-occupied territories north of the Kiel Canal, playing a role in the arrests of high-ranking Nazi officials, including Albert Speer and Admiral Karl Dönitz

== Post-retirement ==
Following the war, Gordon-Creed held diplomatic positions as an attaché in Beirut and Damascus until 1947. He then ventured into various enterprises, including the wine trade and aquaculture in Kenya, where he also founded the Travellers Club in Nairobi. His later years saw him residing in Jamaica, South Africa—where he was a director at Firestone—and finally, South Carolina, US. In 1996, he published his memoir, "A Fool Rushed In," detailing his wartime experiences.
