= Vasil Boydev =

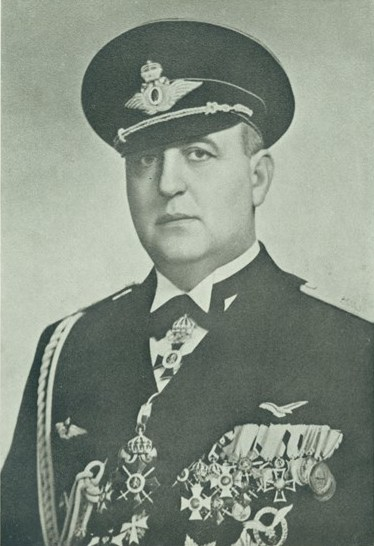
Vasil Boydev

Vasil Boydev (Bulgarian: Васил Бойдев; January 1, 1893 – April 23, 1983) was a Bulgarian Lieutenant-General who fought in World War II.

== Biography ==
Vasil Tenev Boydev was born on January 1, 1893, in the town of Kazanlak. He is the son of Colonel Tenyu Boydev and the older brother of Lieutenant Colonel Anton Boydev. He fought in the Balkan Wars and World War I.

On October 6, 1936, he became commander of the Bulgarian Air Force. Over the next nearly five years, he actively contributed to the restoration and improvement of this new type of armed force, which had previously been severely limited under the provisions of the Treaty of Neuilly-sur-Seine.

In April-May 1941, the Bulgarian Army did not take part in the Wehrmacht's Balkans Campaign against Greece and Yugoslavia, but was ready to occupy its pre-arranged territorial gains immediately after the capitulation of each country.

On August 11, 1941, Boydev replaced General Nikola Mihov at the head of the Fifth Bulgarian Army, which had been newly created for the occupation of Yugoslav Macedonia and Pirot. He remained in command of this occupation Army until May 11, 1944, when he resigned and retired, due to disagreement with the strict pro-German course of the regency around Bogdan Filov and the Minister of War Rusi Rusev.

In 1945, Boydev faced the Bulgarian People's Court, was convicted and sent to a camp. After his sentence expired, he was interned in Troyan, where he lived with his wife until his death on April 23, 1984.

== Sources ==
- generals.dk
- the article in the Bulgarian Wikipedia, Васил Бойдев.
