= Kermet Apio =

American stand up comedian

- Born: Kermet K. Apio; Honolulu, Hawaii, United States
- Notable work: Winner of The Great American Comedy Festival, Unarmed and Lethargic, The Improv

Comedy career
- Medium: Stand-up, television
- Genres: Satire, observational comedy, Improvisational comedy, Sarcasm
- Subjects: education, technology, commercialism, marriage, children, hobbies, health, self-deprecation, everyday life, family, friends, finances, transportation, racism, race relations
- Website: www.ikerm.com/HOME.html

Kermet Apio (pronounced ah-pe-oh) is an American stand-up comedian. He is from Honolulu, Hawaii and resides in Seattle, Washington. He is perhaps best known for being the winner of The Great American Comedy Festival, based out of Norfolk, Nebraska. Similar to other comics, like Brian Regan or Eddie Brill, Apio refrains from off-color humor, instead relying on observational comedy, sarcasm, and satire. Because of this, he has gained even more recognition for being a family friendly comic.

== Biography ==
Apio was born and raised in Honolulu, Hawaii. He often mocks his name, often comparing it to a certain Muppet character in his comedy. After graduating high school, Apio moved to Seattle, Washington, which would later become his home. Apio later became involved in stand-up comedy, where he gained worldwide recognition after winning the Great American Comedy Festival, where he suddenly became swamped with gigs and requests, where Apio used his travel experiences in his comedy. He has appeared at The Improv, The Comedy Cave, The Orpheum of Sioux Falls, the ACME comedy Company in Minneapolis, and comedy festivals all over the world, including China, Israel, New Zealand, and Canada. He has also appeared on channels such as A&E, and PBS. Apio has released his own CD, titled Unarmed and Lethargic.

=== Personal life ===
Apio is married and has two children. He often uses marriage and children in his comedy. He loves baseball and eating pie. Fans regard him as a very humble and friendly man.
