= Jews in Macedonia =

Jews in Macedonia may refer to:

- Jews in Greece, including Greek Macedonia and Thessaloniki
- Jews in North Macedonia
