= Belomorie =

Bulgarian geographical term for Eastern Macedonia and Thrace

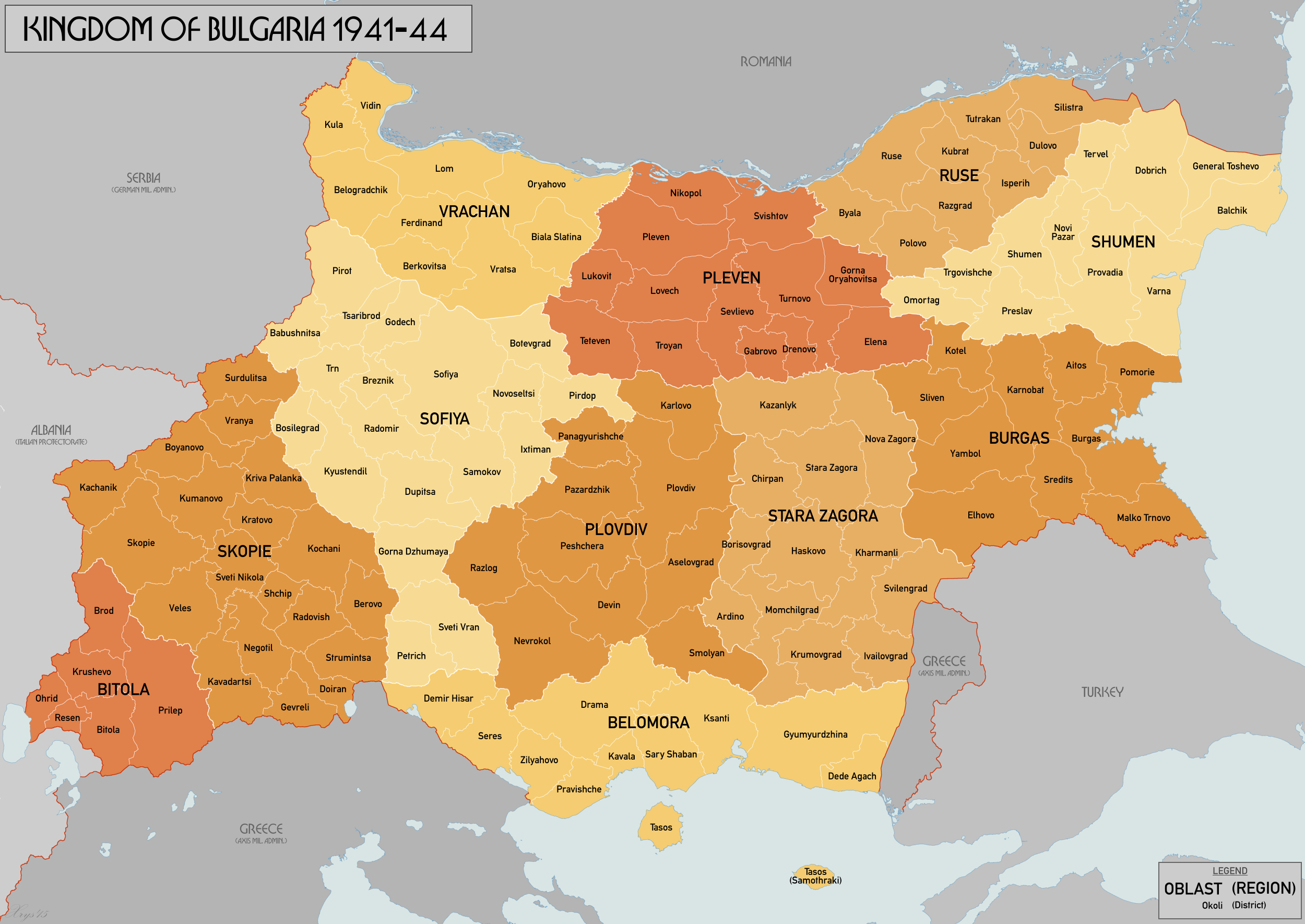
Map of World War II-era Bulgaria with a province "Belomorie" in the territories annexed from Greece.

Belomorie (Bulgarian: Беломорие, lit. 'White Sea seacoast'), meaning Aegean seacoast, is the Bulgarian name for roughly the area of today's Greek province of Eastern Macedonia and Thrace, including the eastern part of Central Macedonia. The name comes from the South Slavic designation of the Aegean Sea, which is translated as the White Sea, in contrast to the Black Sea. The area was fully under Bulgarian control during the First Balkan War, as well as during the First World War and partially in between. It was ruled as a province by Bulgaria with that name during the Axis occupation of Greece in World War II.
