= Fascism in Bulgaria =

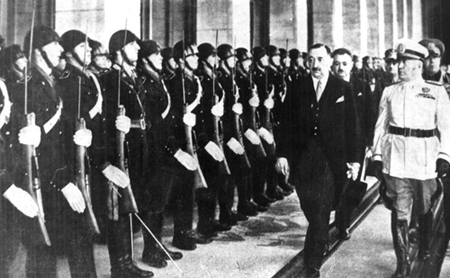
Bulgarian premier Bogdan Filov with Italian leader Benito Mussolini in Rome, 1941

The extent of fascism in Bulgaria is contentious. Many authors state that it never became a mass movement, remaining marginal there, and proved considerably less successful than in the neighboring Balkan states. Bulgaria's fascists were not only weak, divided and lacking clear ideology, but their worldview differed significantly from that of both Italian Fascism and German Nazism. Thus a consensus has been reached between Bulgarian and international experts that Bulgaria's agrarian society and its monarchic system were the barriers before the fascist practices and establishment of fascist regime in the country, while Bulgaria's political system preserved a relative pluralism. An alternative opinion is that some Bulgarian organizations with considerable membership, activity, and social presence had fully developed fascist ideology by the late 1930s, but they neither came to power, nor participated in the government of the country. In fact, fascist organizations did not take power within the framework of the royal dictatorships, but discourses close to fascism can be found in then Bulgarian governing elite.

Although the Bulgarian Marxist historiography labelled the period 1935–1944, as "monarcho-fascism", the 1990s saw the end of the dispute with the Marxist ideological dogmas, and in 1993 came the end of the theory that Bulgarian fascism is an unquestionable fact. Since then the label "fascism" has been openly challenged by Bulgarian scholars, but this led partially, to an untrue radical belief that fascism never existed in Bulgaria. Regardless of the debates about whether or not there was fascism in Bulgaria, no historian denies the existence of political movements and organizations with ideologies sympathetic to Nazism and fascism. What the local fascists were lacking, was enough totalitarian drive, as well as the figure of a führer, without whom they could not contest the authoritarian regime of Tsar Boris. Boris anyway succeeded to preserve the bourgeois social order, but feared the use of these organizations by Germany, and tried to exert a strong control on them.

== History ==
=== Development ===
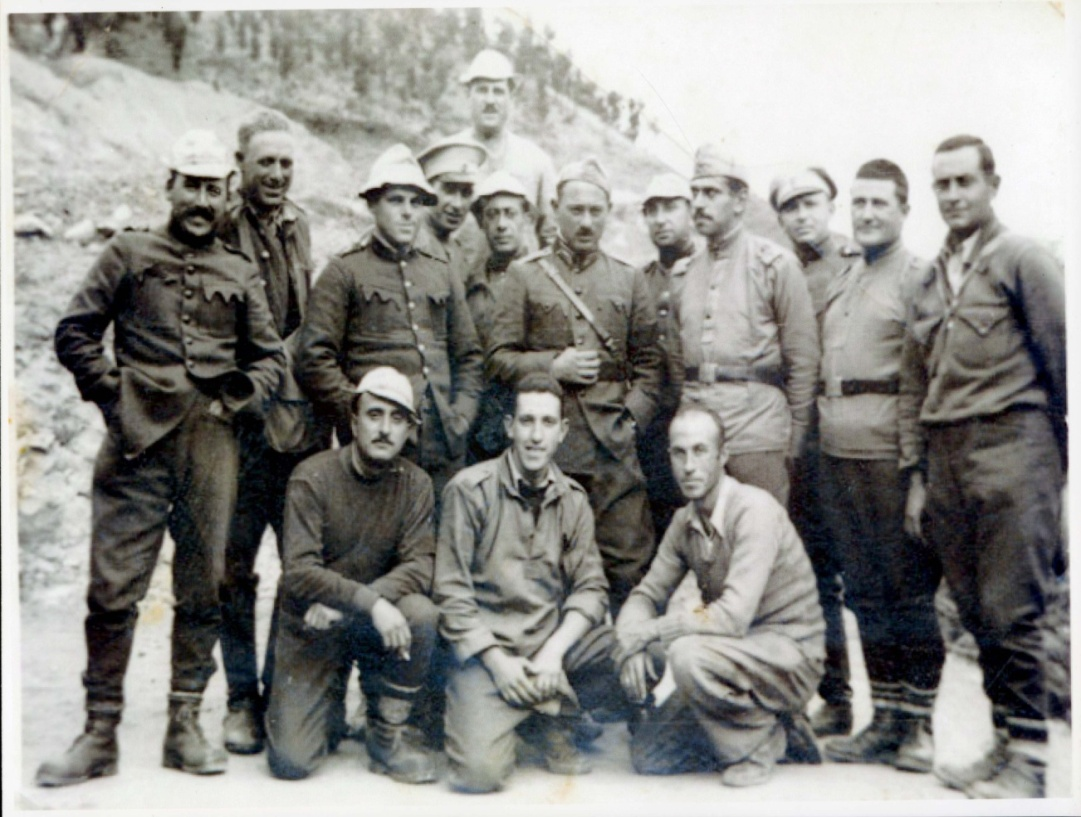
Members of Jewish labour battalion in Bulgaria (1941). All Jewish males who were Bulgarian citizens between the ages of 20 and 46 were conscripted in the Construction corps. Nevertheless, the deportation to extermination camps of nearly all about 48,000 Bulgarian Jews was prevented. The Jews from the occupied Greek and Yugoslav territories (the "Newly liberated lands") had a much worse fate. In this way about 80% of the Jews in then Bulgarian territories survived, while the rest were deported for Nazis' extermination.

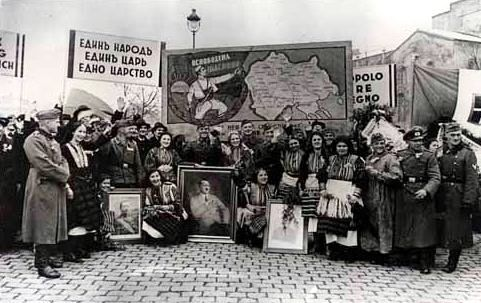
Macedonian Bulgarians in Sofia posing with German soldiers before the invasion in Yugoslavia with portraits of the Axis leaders. The invading Germans were greeted with the same posters in Skopje.

The Bulgarian Marxist historiography labelled the period 1935–1944, as monarcho-fascism and demonized the then rightist movements, due to the authoritarian regime Boris III introduced in 1935, and Bulgaria's accession to the Axis powers during WWII. The personal regime of the Tsar was a mixture of authoritarian, conservative and fascist ideas. While in the West it was considered a "royal dictatorship," in marxist history it is described as "monarcho-fascism". In fact fascists in interwar Bulgaria were split into several small movements as the National Social Movement, the Union of Bulgarian National Legions and the Ratniks. They were unable to become prominent political forces in the country. Bulgarian fascist movements faced problems differentiating their goals from other elements of the far right political authoritarian movements. The temporal power of conservative authoritarian rivals who were in control of the government from 1934 to 1944, contributed to the weakness of these fascist groups. The National Social Movement (NSM) founded by Aleksandar Tsankov as a genuinely fascist group was taking inspiration from the NSDAP and rose by the early to mid 1930s. The second fascist movement, the Union of Bulgarian National Legions, was started by general Hristo Lukov and later became an ally of the NSM, though being more ideologically radical. The third fascist movement, the Union of the Ratniks, was founded by Professor Asen Kantardzhiev. It was also closer to the German Nazis than to Italian fascism.

Fascism became influential in Bulgaria during the 1930s, when parliamentary democracy has failed. In May 1934 Bulgarian coup d'état was carried out by the Zveno military organization, aided by the Bulgarian Army, which abolished political parties altogether. As result the small Bulgarian National Socialist Workers Party disappeared. However, in April 1935, the officers were replaced by Tsar Boris. Since then, the Tsar decided to take power into his own hands, while elections were held in 1939 on a nonpartisan basis. That was some kind of "royal dictatorship" similar to the one implemented by Alexander I of Yugoslavia between 1929 and 1931. In 1940, upon Bulgaria getting into the new war on the Axis side, the regime was institutionalized by creating a fascist-type mass youth movement called Brannik. Despite that organisation became numerically large, Bulgaria hadn't developed a corporate economic system essential to fascism nor any adult counterparts like trade unions or militias were created. Anti-Jewish propaganda gradually intensified in Bulgaria which led to the introduction of antisemitic law. Boris III feared the use of these organizations as a means of pressure from Germany and sought to limit their contacts with German officials. Boris died in 1943 and was replaced by a regent council, while it was itself overthrown the next year, making the country now on side with the Allies. In September 1944, the Zveno and the anti-Axis Fatherland Front engineered a new coup d'état. Curiously, while the fascist influence on the Zveno itself is undisputed, the ideology of that organization in its character was not fascist. Thus, fascism proved considerably less successful in Bulgaria than in WWII Romania, Hungary, Croatia or Serbia.

==== Extreme interpretations in Bulgaria ====
For the extreme left in Bulgaria after the fall of communism, before the coup on September 9, 1944, there was a fascist regime, and the Bulgarian communist guerillas represented the only struggle for freedom, which culminated in the fall of 1944. The same mythological scheme obeys the extreme right narrative, according to which fascism in Bulgaria was completely unknown then. Since the arrival of the Soviet troops in September 1944, the lower social strata took advantage and destroyed the nation's elite, thus interrupting the country's historical development.

=== Interpretations in North Macedonia ===
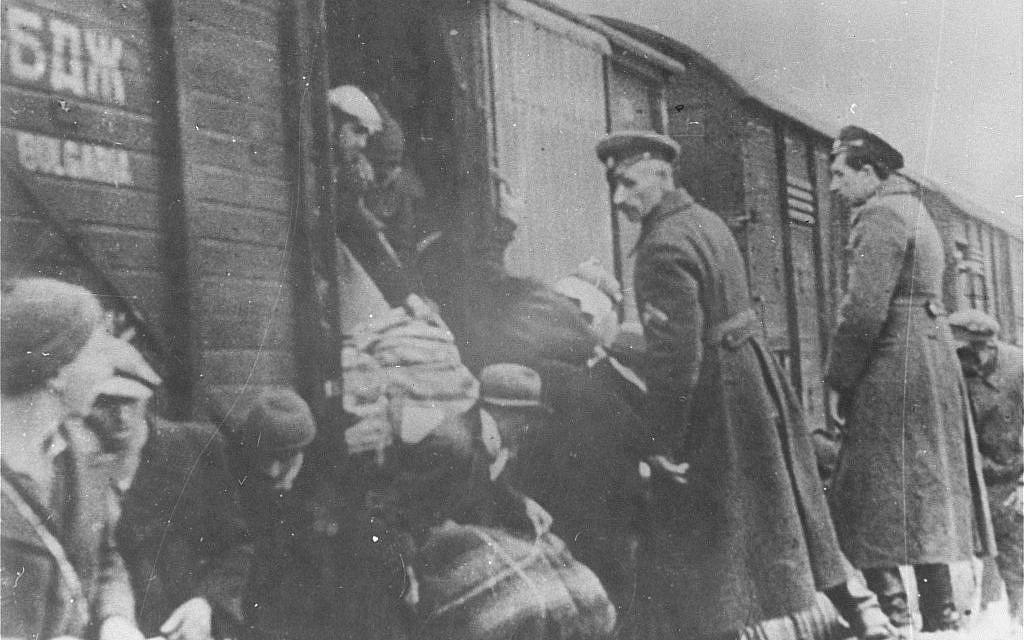
Bulgarian policemеn and soldiers deporting Macedonian Jews in 1943. Many of them were recruited Macedonian Slavs, regarded by the authorities as Bulgarians. Bulgaria insists on the rescue of its Jews, and compares their destiny to the killing of the Jews in Bulgarian-occupied territories.

During the Second World War, the Kingdom of Bulgaria occupied the territory of what is today North Macedonia, then Yugoslav province called Vardar Banovina, where domestic policy of forced Serbianisation was implemented since the Balkan wars. There are evidences, initially the Slavic population greeted Bulgarian army with great enthusiasm, as an effect of the previous repressive Serbian rule, while pro-Bulgarian feelings in it prevailed. However, afterwards the Bulgarian regime started a policy of Bulgarianization, they set up some youth organisations inspired by fascist ideas. Thus estranging the population as the occupation went on. Macedonian historiography considers this period as the "Bulgarian fascist occupation" and have glorified the communist resistance there which was weak until 1943. Bulgaria switched sides in the war in September 1944, and almost all of that area was cleansed of German units by the Bulgarian army, by which the local population, calmly accepted the Bulgarian military presence as a result of the idea of a future federation between Yugoslavia and Bulgaria that was being promoted. Although the Bulgarian army drove the Germans out of this region then, today the Macedonian historiography has played down its role.

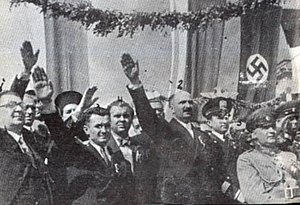
Anton Kozarov, Dimitar Chkatrov, Petar Dumev, the Bulgarian Minister of Internal Affairs Petar Gabrovski, Dimitar Gyuzelov and other local Bulgarian officials in Skopje, doing the fascist salute.

This historical narrative was developed in post-WWII Yugoslav Macedonia and became one of the milestones of the nation-building process there, which is based till today on a deeply anti-Bulgarian stance. The Macedonian communist authorities did a lot to equate the terms Bulgarian and Bulgarophile with "fascist occupier". After the Fall of communism, Macedonian historiography did not significantly revise its communist past, because the very Macedonian nation was a result of the communist policies. The last leader of the pro-Bulgarian Internal Macedonian Revolutionary Organization - Ivan Mihailov, and its activity during the interwar period, including the failed attempt to establish a pro-German Macedonian puppet-state in 1944, are also regarded as "fascist". Per the Holocaust the Macedonian historians have built a narrative of the common suffering and powerlessness of the locals to confront "Bulgarian fascists" in the context of a ruthless occupation. Although filled with 'sympathy' for the Jews, the Macedonians were powerless to prevent their deportation. Paradoxically, in North Macedonia, which declared independence in 1991, the issue of war reparations payment by Bulgaria has been raised, although this case was settled in 1947 between Yugoslavia and Bulgaria. According to a secret report of the German consul in Skopje to the German legation in Sofia dated March 18, 1943, the local population fully welcomed the internment of the Jews.

Today there are revisionist opinions in North Macedonia that question the official historical narrative inherited from the communist era. In a discussion held in Macedonian parliament in 2007, the MP and professor of pathology Vesna Janevska, has stated the conflict between Bulgarian authorities and the local Yugoslav partisans was a fratricidal war or a civil war. According to the speaker of the parliament Ljubiša Georgievski, professor of theater arts, the partisan who fired the bullet, with which symbolically started the so-called Macedonian uprising against Bulgarian fascist occupiers, told him that the Bulgarian policeman he killed, was actually a local resident, his neighbor and friend of his father. This murder weighed on him all his life. In 2020 the then Premier Zoran Zaev claimed that by his order inscriptions with the text "Bulgarian fascist occupier" on some communist era monuments were removed, because that did not correspond with the historical truth. According to the Macedonian researcher Katerina Kolozova, this terminology today is groundless, because significant part of these "occupiers" were practically local collaborators of the Bulgarian authorities. Due to this, she has argued that North Macedonia owes an apology to the Jewish people too. She maintains the descendants of the Yugoslav communist partisans in her country who form the post-Yugoslav elite are the main factor that ignites these anti-Bulgarian sentiments there. According to the former Macedonian Prime Minister Lyubcho Georgievski, the "Bulgarian occupiers" were welcomed as liberators from Serbian occupation, which was much longer and more difficult than the Bulgarian one, but in regard to which, the Macedonian society has fallen into a long historical amnesia. According to Dragi Gjorgiev, director of the Institute of National History in North Macedonia, Bulgaria couldn't be defined as a classic fascist state at that time, but rather a pro-fascist one. The terms which might be used in this case are Bulgarian occupation, Bulgarian invasion and Bulgarian annexation.

==== Bulgarian views ====
Bulgaria has insisted that North Macedonia should stop using the term "fascist occupation" in reference to the country and should remove all such mentions on the World War II monuments in the country. Bulgaria denies that assertion and claims its army liberated its brethren firstly from Serbian oppression and later from German occupation. It insists also the two countries must "harmonize" historic literature about WWII, "overcoming the hate speech" against Bulgaria. On the Holocaust the Bulgarian historiography claims that the citizens of the "Old lands" of the kingdom, who had rescued the Jews there, lacked the time to mobilize themselves against the deportations from the "Newly liberated lands", where their Slavic fellow citizens were apathic to the fate of the local Jews.

== Organizations ==
- Rodna Zashtita
- Union of Bulgarian National Legions
- National Socialist Bulgarian Workers Party
- National Social Movement
- Ratniks

== See also ==
- The Holocaust in Bulgaria
- Bulgarian government-in-exile
- Waffen Grenadier Regiment of the SS (1st Bulgarian)
