= Spiro Kitinchev =

Bulgarian writer, activist, and politician (1895–1946)

- Born: 1895; Skopje, Ottoman Empire
- Died: 1946 (aged 50–51); Idrizovo, FPR Yugoslavia
- Education: University of Lausanne
- Father: Gyore Kitinchev

Spiro Kitinchev (1895–1946) was a Macedonian Bulgarian writer, activist, and politician during the Second World War in Yugoslav Macedonia.

== Biography ==
During his teenage years Spiro attended the Bulgarian Men's High School of Thessaloniki, then part of the Ottoman Empire. In 1912 Skopje was ceded to Serbia where the local Bulgarians were faced with the policy of forced serbianisation. When during World War I Bulgaria occupied Macedonia (1915 - 1918) his father, Georgi Kitinchev became a mayor of Skopje. At the same time he studied in Lausanne, Switzerland. In 1917, Spiro published an article in the Gazette de Lausanne called "Bulgarian Propaganda in Switzerland". He claimed there that during the Bulgarian occupation of Macedonia in the First World War, the Bulgarians who presented themselves as "brothers" and "liberators", yet behaved no better than the Ottomans and the Serbs. Spiro was involved there in the organization of Macedonian students called MYSRO. In 1919, during the meetings of the Paris Peace Conference, the MYSRO issued appeals in favor of an independent multiethnic Macedonian state, based on the principle of the Swiss Confederation.

After 1919, Kitinchev returned to Skopje, then part of Kingdom of Yugoslavia. He was among the founders of Luch magazine and a propagandist of the idea of publishing materials of local dialect. At the time he became a member of the right-wing IMRO regional committee. During 1930s Kitinchev was arrested several times by the Serbian authorities. In 1936, together with Dimitar Chkatrov and Dimitar Gyuzelov, he joined the democratic organization MANAPO. In 1930s a more homogeneous generation was growing up in Vardar Macedonia, which resisted serbianisation, but which also made it clear that the Bulgarian national idea was no more the only option for them.

During the Invasion of Yugoslavia in April 1941, Kitinchev was elected vice-president of the Bulgarian Action Committees After the town subsequently was annexed again by Bulgaria (1941–1944) he became a mayor of Skopje. Despite the slight change of the younger generation in the 1930s, anti-Serbian and pro-Bulgarian sentiments still prevailed. There is a no doubt that the Bulgarians were greeted as liberators. The Macedonian national identity then hardly existed.

In the early September 1944 Bulgaria ordered its troops to prepare for withdrawal from former Yugoslavia and on 8 September, the Bulgarians changed sides and declared war on Germany. On the same day pro-German puppet state was declared by right-wing Macedonian nationalists and among its leaders were Kitinchev, Vasil Hadzhikimov, Stefan Stefanov, Dimitar Gyuzelov and Dimitar Tchkatrov. They had foreseen the future of this independent Macedonia under the protectorate of the Third Reich. The state had to have a Bulgarian character and its official language to be Bulgarian. Without the means to make the state a reality, this pretense dissolved as soon as the Yugoslav Partisans asserted their control following the withdrawal of German troops from the area during November. This event marked the defeat of Bulgarian nationalism and the victory of the Macedonism in the area.

Yugoslav Communists recognized then the existence of a distinct Macedonian nationality to quiet the fears of the Macedonian Slavs that would continue to follow the policy of forced "serbianization". Recognizing ethnic Bulgarian inhabitants in Macedonia would not quell descension toward Macedonian nationalism. The new authorities accused Kitinchev, who was already arrested, of being Bulgarian nationalist and Bulgarian fascist occupiers collaborator. Kitinchev was sentenced to death but it would be commuted to 20-years sentence. He died in Idrizovo prison after a year of tuberculosis and torture.

== See also ==
- Anti-fascist Assembly for the National Liberation of Macedonia
- 1944 Bulgarian coup d'état
- Stratsin-Kumanovo operation

== Literature ==
- "Les Atrocités serbes, d'après les témoignages américains, anglais, français, italiens, russes, serbes, suisses, etc.", Lausanne, 1919 година
- "Показания на Спиро Китинчев пред органите на ОЗНА на Македония за дейността му като политически деец и кмет на Скопие", публикувано в "Българското управление във Вардарска Македония (1941-1944)", София, 2011 година
