= National Socialist Bulgarian Workers Party =

Bulgarian Nazi party

National Socialist Bulgarian Workers Party Националсоциалистическа българска работническа партия
- Leader: Hristo Kunchev
- Founded: May 15, 1932
- Banned: 1934
- Headquarters: Sofia
- Newspaper: Attack!
- Ideology: Nazism; Bulgarian nationalism Antisemitism; Anti-Masonry; Germanophile
- Political position: Far-right
- Religion: Bulgarian Orthodox Church
- Colors: Black and yellow

Party flag

The National Socialist Bulgarian Workers Party (Bulgarian: Националсоциалистическа българска работническа партия) was a Nazi party based in the Kingdom of Bulgaria.

It was one of a number of antisemitic groups to emerge in Bulgaria after the rise of Adolf Hitler in Germany, with other notable groups including the Union of Bulgarian National Legions and Ratniks. The party was established by Doctor Hristo Kunchev in 1932, who had studied medicine in Berlin. The party sought to copy the Nazi Party by adopting the National Socialist Program, the swastika and other symbols of the German party. Unlike some of its competitors on the far right like the Union of Bulgarian National Legions and the Ratniks, it was not a very influential group and had a relatively small membership with only a hundred people active in its core. The party published a newspaper called Ataka ('Attack', a name similar to Der Angriff of Joseph Goebbels) in which it criticized the Bulgarian Freemasonry which, according to the party, had a significant role in Bulgarian politics. In this regard Aleksandar Tsankov, a leader of the rivalling National Social Movement, was attacked. In the September 1932 municipal elections, of 68,000 voters, 47,823 voted, and Bulgarian National Socialists obtained only 147 votes (0.31%) and ranked 18th among the participants. Through 1933, it was divided and disappeared after all political parties were banned after the coup of 9 May 1934.

== See also ==
- Fascism in Bulgaria
