= Bulgarian National Alliance =

Bulgarian neo-fascist organization

Bulgarian National Alliance Edelweiss Български национален съюз
- Leader: Zvezdomir Andronov
- Founder: Boyan Rassate
- Founded: 2001
- Headquarters: Sofia, Bulgaria
- Youth wing: BNA – sports organization
- Ideology: Bulgarian nationalism; Neo-fascism; Bulgarian irredentism; Anti-communism; Anti-Americanism; Anti-Western sentiment; Hard Euroscepticism; Opposition to NATO; Right-wing populism; Islamophobia; Antiziganism; Right-wing antiglobalism; Anti-LGBT sentiment; Homophobia; Anti-abortion
- Political position: Far-right
- Colors: White; Green; Red; Black

Party flag

Website
- https://bgns.net/; https://bns-rassate.bg/

The Bulgarian National Alliance (Note: Bulgarian: Български национален съюз; officially registered as Bulgarian National Alliance Edelweiss (Bulgarian: Български Национален Съюз Еделвайс), shortened as BNA "Edelweiss" (Bulgarian: БНС „Еделвайс“)), also called the Bulgarian National Union, is a Bulgarian far-right informal organization headquartered in Sofia, founded in 2001 by Boyan Rassate, which claims to be a successor to the fascist Union of Bulgarian National Legions, led by general Hristo Lukov.

== History ==
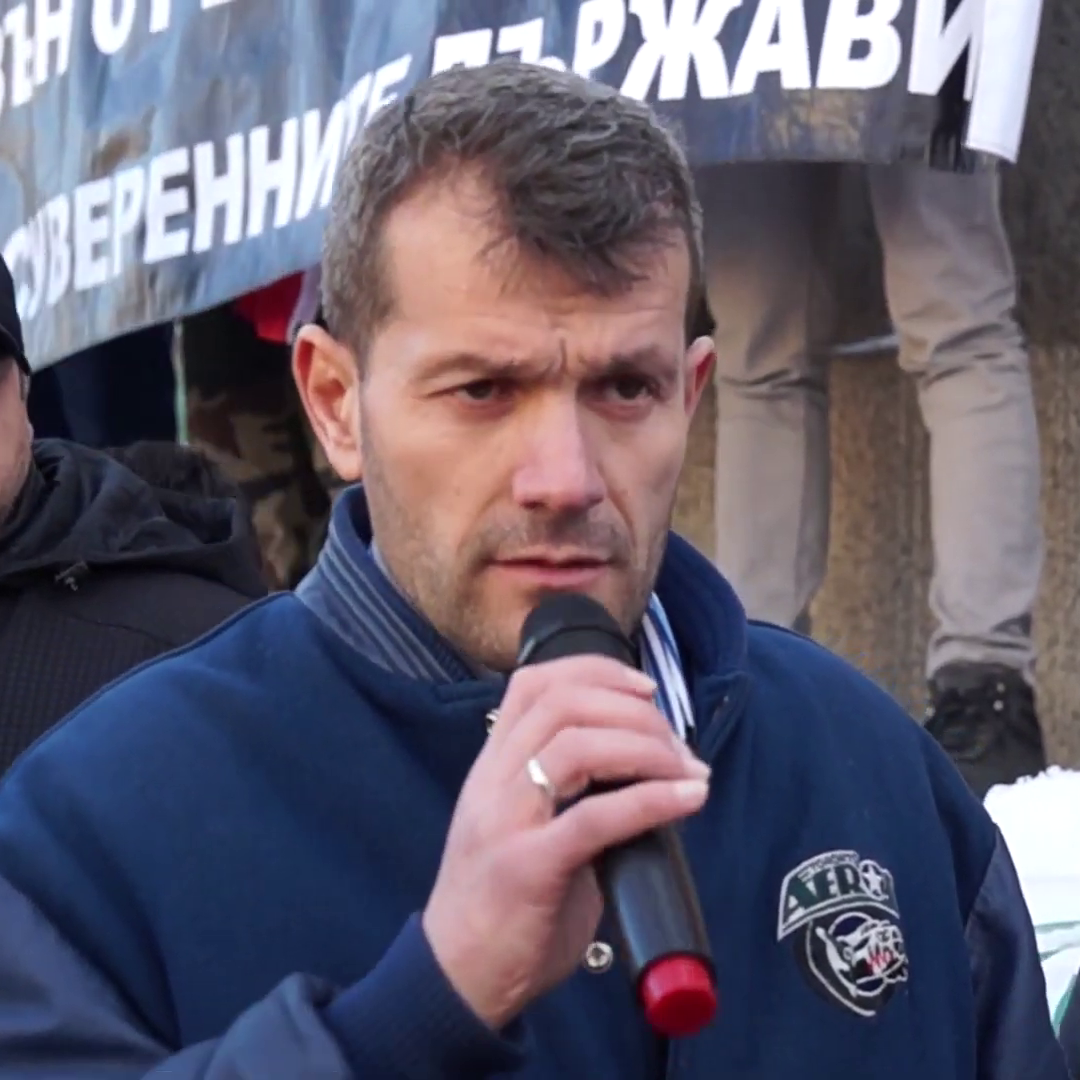
Rasate in 2016

The long-time leader of the organization is Boyan Stankov, who goes under the pseudonym Rasate, host of National Guard (Bulgarian: Национална гвардия) on the Balkan Bulgarian Television channel. In 2010, he stepped down as leader. In his place, Zvezdomir Andronov, Asen Krastev and Nikolai Nikolaev were elected co-leaders.

In August 2007, after riots and demonstrations in the Krasna Polyana district in Sofia, BNA "Edelweiss" announced that they would create a "national guard" – an organization to protect Bulgarians, mainly from "Gypsy terror".

Former leader Boyan Rasate headed the list of the Bulgarian National Union - New Democracy (BNU-ND) for the early parliamentary elections on October 5, 2014. On this occasion, BNA "Edelweiss" issued a public statement emphasizing that they are not related to the BNS-ND party and that BNA "Edelweiss" does not "explicitly or implicitly" support any of the political parties participating in the elections.

The organization cooperates in joint initiatives with the nationalist IMRO – Bulgarian National Movement and Blood & Honor.

The organization has been registered as a non-profit legal entity for private benefit since 2001

== Criticism ==
The Bulgarian National Alliance has been criticized for holding fascist and neo-Nazi views. The organization claims to be the successor to the Union of Bulgarian National Legions (UBNL), an ultranationalist pro-fascist, and pro-Nazi organization in Bulgaria, active from 1932 to 1944 and is considered the most powerful fascist movement in Bulgarian history.

Due to the group's organization in the annual Lukov March, аnd also due to other events, the Bulgarian National Alliance is regarded as a proponent of neo-fascist, neo-Nazi, racist and homophobic ideologies.
