= Independent Macedonia (1944) =

Proposed puppet state of Nazi Germany

The red and black flag used by the Internal Macedonian Revolutionary Organization and more broadly by supporters of an autonomous or independent Macedonia

The Independent State of Macedonia (Note: Macedonian: Независна Држава Македонија; Bulgarian: Независима държава Македония; German: Unabhängiger Staat Mazedonien) was a proposed puppet state of Nazi Germany during the Second World War in the territory of the Kingdom of Yugoslavia that had been occupied by the Tsardom of Bulgaria following the invasion of Yugoslavia in April 1941.

When Soviet Union forces approached the borders of Bulgaria near the end of August 1944, Bulgaria declared neutrality and briefly sought to negotiate with the Western Allies. As the Bulgarian government was not impeding the withdrawal of German forces from Bulgaria or Romania, the Soviet Union treated it with suspicion. On 2 September, a new pro-Western government took power in Sofia, only to be replaced a week later by a pro-Soviet government after a Fatherland Front–led coup. However, on 5 September 1944, the Soviets declared war on Bulgaria.

The Germans turned to Ivan Mihailov to implement the scheme. Mihailov was a Bulgarophile right-wing politician and former leader of the Internal Macedonian Revolutionary Organization (IMRO) who had been engaged in terrorist activity in Yugoslav and Greek Macedonia. Mihailov had become leader of IMRO in 1927 and under his leadership the organisation had joined forces with the Croatian Ustaše in 1929. The two organisations had planned and executed the assassination of King Alexander of Yugoslavia in 1934. After the Bulgarian military coup d'état in the same year, IMRO was banned by the Bulgarian authorities. Mihailov fled to Turkey and then Italy, where most of the Ustaše were also in exile. After the invasion of Yugoslavia in 1941, Mihailov had moved to Zagreb where he had acted as an advisor to Ante Pavelić. In January 1944 he had successfully lobbied the Germans to arm some Ohrana supporters and have them placed under Schutzstaffel (SS) command in Greek Macedonia, which had also been in part annexed by Bulgaria in 1941.

In 1928, Mihailov proposed a plan calling for the unification of the region of Macedonia into a single state, that would be autonomous from Bulgaria. He was a proponent of a pro-Bulgarian United Macedonian multi-ethnic state, calling it: "Switzerland of the Balkans". During the last phase of the Second World War he tried to realise his plan with German political collaboration; however, he abandoned the implementation of this idea due to the lack of real military support. Despite this, an independent state was declared by Macedonian nationalists on 8 September 1944. Without the means to make the state a reality, this pretence dissolved as soon as the Yugoslav Partisans asserted their control following the withdrawal of German troops from the area by mid-November. This event marked the defeat of the Bulgarian nationalism and the victory of the Macedonism in the area.

== Background ==
Bulgaria joined the Axis powers on 1 March 1941, but remained passive during the invasion of Yugoslavia and most of the invasion of Greece. Yugoslavia surrendered on 17 April and Greece on 30 April. On 20 April, the Bulgarian army entered Greece and Yugoslavia with the aim of gaining access to the Aegean Sea in Thrace and eastern Macedonia. During the Second World War, Bulgaria occupied much of what is now North Macedonia, as well as parts of southern Serbia and northern Greece. The western part of present-day North Macedonia was occupied by Italy. Unlike Germany and Italy, on 14 May, Bulgaria annexed the occupied areas, which had long been the target of Bulgarian nationalism. Germany, however, considered the annexation inconclusive and imposed limited Bulgarian sovereignty over the occupied territories. The Bulgarians were initially welcomed by the locals as liberators, since pro-Bulgarian sentiments were prevalent among the local population. In Vardar Macedonia, a powerful Yugoslav partisan movement did not develop until the autumn of 1943.

According to the Bulgarian historian Dobrin Michev, Mihailov, who lived in Zagreb during the war, traveled in disguise to Germany around 1 August 1943, where in the Führer Headquarters and in the premises of the Reich Security Main Office, he met with Hitler, Heinrich Himmler and other senior German officials, with whom, according to scant information, it was agreed that he would raise two or three volunteer battalions, armed with German arms and ammunition, to operate under the operational command and disposition of Reichsführer-SS Himmler. According to Michev, at the same time, talks were also held in Sofia between high-ranking Schutzstaffel officials and the members of the Central Committee of IMRO Vladimir Kurtev, Zhoro Nastev and Dimitar Tsilev.

On 14 August 1943, a few days before his death, the Bulgarian king Boris III met with Adolf Hitler in Germany. During the talks, Hitler advocated the creation of an autonomous Macedonia within the borders of Bulgaria, with Mihailov as its head. Boris agreed to this proposal. Hitler was also determined to convince him to declare war on the Soviet Union and transfer most of the Bulgarian Army to the Eastern Front and the Italian Front. As a result, the IMRO militias were to take over the functions of the Bulgarian Army in the so-called "newly liberated territories" in Greece and Yugoslavia. After Boris' subsequent death, this plan failed. However, it became apparent that Mihailov had broader plans, which included the establishment of an independent Macedonian state under German control. The IMRO also began to actively organize pro-Bulgarian militias in the former Italian and German occupied zones in Greece. Bulgaria watched these activities of Mihailov with concern, fearing that his plan to establish an "Independent Macedonia" might succeed. In an attempt to bring him under its control, Bulgaria lifted his death sentence and offered him to return to the country and take up a leading position in Vardar Macedonia, but he rejected this proposal.

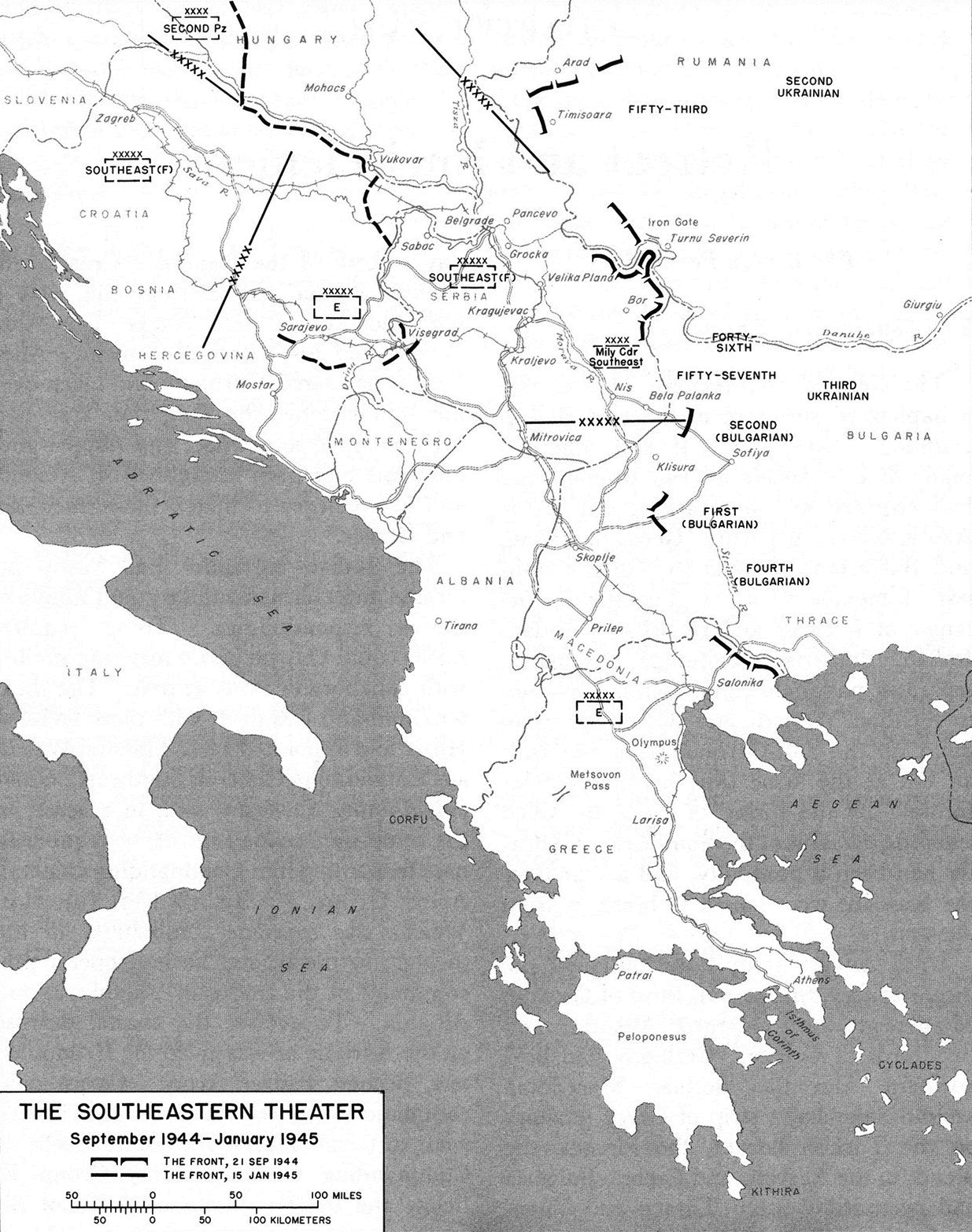
Map of the Balkan military theater during September 1944 – January 1945.

Meanwhile, the Bulgarians, who staffed the new provinces with corrupted officials from Bulgaria proper began to lose the public confidence. This process accelerated after the King's dead which concurred with the capitulation of Italy and the Soviet victories over the Nazi Germany in the summer of 1943. On this basis, the Yugoslav communists, who supported the recognition of a separate Macedonian nation, managed to organize an earnest armed resistance against the Bulgarian forces in the autumn of 1943. Many former IMRO right-wing activists assisted the authorities in fighting Tito's partizans.

In the August 1944, the Soviet Army was approaching the Balkans. On the other hand, at the same time, the Yugoslav Partisans, who "articulated the slogan of Macedonian unification", increased their activities in Macedonia. As result, the Anti-fascist Assembly for the National Liberation of Macedonia (ASNOM) declared the foundation of the Macedonian state on 2 August 1944. The state was proclaimed in the Bulgarian occupation zone of Yugoslavia. On 23 August, Romania left the Axis Powers, declared war on Germany, and allowed Soviet forces to cross its territory to reach Bulgaria. At that time, Bulgaria made a drive to find separate peace, repudiating any alliance with Nazi Germany, and declared neutrality on 26 August. However, its secret negotiations with the Allies in Cairo, to allow it to retain the annexed areas in Greece and Yugoslavia failed, because Bulgaria was "not in a position to argue".

== Proposed state ==
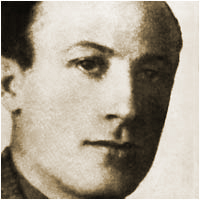
Ivan Mihailov

At that time the Partisans were active in western Macedonia, then under German control, as part of an Albanian puppet-state. Using the situation the Nazis sent a plenipotentiary to meet with Ivan Mihailov, the leader of the IMRO at that time. Mihailov was in Zagreb serving as an adviser to Ante Pavelić where he was pushing for the formation of volunteer units to operate in what is now the Greek province of Macedonia under Schutzstaffel (SS) command. He, as most of the right wing followers of the former IMRO, were pro-Bulgarian orientated, and did not support the existence of Communist Yugoslavia. The Germans were becoming increasingly overwhelmed and, in a last-ditch effort, tried to establish a Macedonian puppet-state. That was the only alternative, instead to leave it to Bulgaria, which was switching the sides. At the evening on 3 September, Mihailov was sent to Sofia, to negotiate here with the Bulgarian authorities and his comrades. When on 5 September, the Soviet Union declared war on Bulgaria Mihailov was transported urgently from Sofia to Skopje.

Contacts were established here with another IMRO leader, Hristo Tatarchev who was offered the position of president of the proposed state. Negotiations were also held with the Macedonian Partisans, mediated by the Bulgarian minister of Internal Affairs Alexandar Stanishev. In spite of all of this, Mihailov's arrival came too late and all negotiations failed. On the next day, 6 September, Mihailov declined the plan for inability to gain support. The failure led to ordering German withdrawal from Greece the same day, when Mihailov and his wife were also evacuated from Skopje. Bulgaria immediately ordered its troops to prepare for withdrawal from former Yugoslavia and on 8 September, the Bulgarians changed sides and joined the Soviet Union. This turn of the events, put the Bulgarian 5th. Army stationed in Macedonia, in a difficult situation, surrounded by German divisions, but it fought its way back to the old borders of Bulgaria.

On 8 September, right-wing IMRO nationalists declared independence. A faction—including Dimitar Chkatrov, Spiro Kitinchev, Dimitar Gyuzelov—had foreseen the future of this independent Macedonian state under the protectorate of the Third Reich. The state had to have a Bulgarian character and its official language to be Bulgarian. However, the self-proclaimed state was left "virtually defenseless" following the withdrawal of German troops.

== Aftermath ==
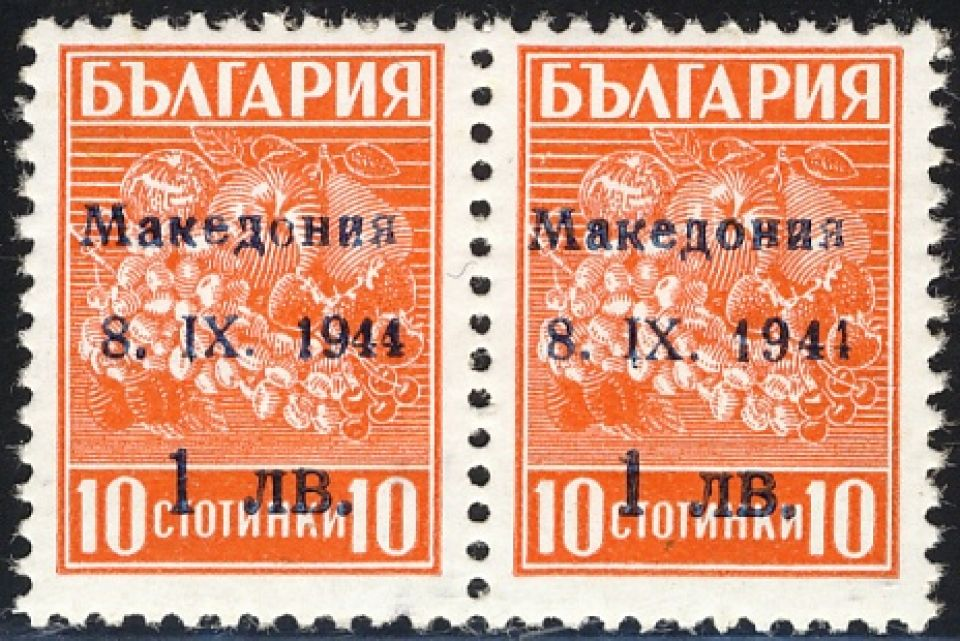
Bulgarian postage stamps overprinted for use in Independent Macedonia. They are dated September 8, 1944 − the date of the proclamation of the state.

The German command in Skopje did not support the "independent" Macedonian state as their forces withdrew from the region. In the chaos, it tried only to use the new-formed "Macedonian committees" as local police services. Their members were people as Vasil Hadzhikimov, Stefan Stefanov, Spiro Kitinchev, Dimitar Gyuzelov and Dimitar Tchkatrov, all of them former activists of the IMRO, the Macedonian Youth Secret Revolutionary Organization and the Bulgarian Action Committees. In between, in the early October 1944, three Bulgarian armies under the leadership of the new Bulgarian pro-Soviet government, together with the Red Army reentered occupied Yugoslavia. The Bulgarian forces entered Yugoslavia on the basis of an agreement between Josip Broz Tito and the Bulgarian partisan leader Dobri Terpeshev signed on 5 October in Craiova, Romania with the mediation of the USSR.

Despite some difficulties in cooperation between the two forces, the Bulgarians worked in conjunction with the Yugoslav Partisans in Macedonia, and managed to delay the German withdrawal through the region by ten to twelve days. By mid-November all German formations had withdrawn to the west and north and the Partisans had established military and administrative control of the region. However, under the political pressure of the Partisans, after the liberation of Vardar Macedonia, the Second and Fourth Bulgarian armies were forced to retreat back to the old borders of Bulgaria at the end of November. The ASNOM became operational in December, shortly after the German retreat. The Macedonian national feelings were already ripe at that time as compared to 1941, but some researchers argue that even then, it was questionable whether the Macedonian Slavs considered themselves to be a nationality separate from the Bulgarians. Subsequently, to wipe out the remaining Bulgarophile sentiments, the new Communist authorities persecuted the right-wing nationalists with the charges of "great-Bulgarian chauvinism". The next task was also to break up all the pro-Bulgarian organisations that opposed the idea of Yugoslavia. So even left-wing politicians were imprisoned and accused of being pro-Bulgarian oriented. Seeing that he had little support, Mihailov went into hiding, first moving from Croatia to Austria and eventually to Spain and finally to Italy where remained until he died in 1990.

== See also ==
- Macedonian question
- Autonomy for Macedonia and Adrianople regions, a nationalist concept ca. end of 19th century
- Independent Macedonia (IMRO), a nationalist concept in the interwar period
- United Macedonia, an irredentist concept ca. 1990s
- Military history of Bulgaria during World War II
- Communist resistance in Vardar Macedonia

== Bibliography ==
- Chary, Frederick B. (1972). The Bulgarian Jews and the Final Solution, 1940-1944. University of Pittsburgh Press. ISBN 0-822984-43-1.
- Danforth, Loring M. (1995). The Macedonian Conflict: Ethnic Nationalism in a Transnational World. Princeton University Press. ISBN 0-691043-56-6.
- Dear, Ian C.B. (2005). "World War II". In Dear, Ian C.B.; Foot, Michael R. D. (eds.). The Oxford Companion to World War II. Oxford University Press. ISBN 0-192806-66-1.
- Fischer, Bernd J. (2007). Balkan Strongmen: Dictators and Authoritian Rulers of Southeast Europe. Purdue University Press. ISBN 978-1-55753-455-2.
- Poulton, Hugh (2003). "Macedonians and Albanians as Yugoslavs". In Đokić, Dejan (ed.). Yugoslavism: Histories of a Failed Idea, 1918-1992. C. Hurst & Co. Publishers. ISBN 1-850656-63-0.
- Ramet, Sabrina P. (2006). The Three Yugoslavias: State-Building and Legitimation, 1918–2005. Bloomington: Indiana University Press. ISBN 978-0-253-34656-8.
- Todorovski, Zoran (1997). Vnatrešnata makedonska revolucionerna organizacija, 1924–1934 (in Serbo-Croatian). Skopje: Robz.
- Tomasevich, Jozo (2001). War and Revolution in Yugoslavia, 1941–1945: Occupation and Collaboration. Stanford: Stanford University Press. ISBN 978-0-8047-3615-2.
- IMRO (United). Documents and materials, book I and II, Ivan Katandzhiev, Skopje, 1991, 1992
- History of Bulgaria, Sofia, 1994
- For independent state Croatia: common struggle of the Croats and Macedonians, Wien, 1932
