= Ivan Dochev =

Bulgarian politician

- Born: Ivan Dimitrov Dochev; January 7, 1906; Shumen, Bulgaria
- Died: May 14, 2005 (aged 99); Shumen, Bulgaria
- Education: Sofia University, University of Heidelberg
- Occupation: Civil servant
- Known for: Political activist
- Notable work: Half century struggle against communism for the freedom of Bulgaria (1982)
- Political party: Union of Bulgarian National Legions, Bulgarian National Front

Ivan Dimitrov Dochev (Bulgarian: Иван Димитров Дочев) (7 January 1906 – 14 May 2005) was a Bulgarian far-right politician active either side of the Second World War.

== Early years ==
Born in Shumen the son of an army colonel, Dochev worked in the civil service from 1926 to 1932 when he went to Sofia University to study law and politics. It was at university that he first became involved in politics, taking charge of the student organisation.

== Fascism ==
In 1933 he was a founder of the Union of Young National Legions and became part of the triumvirate that officially led this movement. The group was initially anti-communist and nationalist but it soon came under the influence of Italian fascism and Nazism and added corporatism and anti-Semitism to its platform. In 1934 Dochev went to Nazi Germany with Nikola Zhekov and met both Adolf Hitler and Alfred Rosenberg. Dochev failed to come fully to terms with Hitler however as he would not support the Nazi demand for the Legions to overthrow Tsar Boris.

His movement adopted its more familiar name of the Union of Bulgarian National Legions in 1937 and the following year it split with Dochev leading one wing away from the main group under Hristo Lukov.

== War-time and European exile ==
Dochev was reconciled to Lukov during the Second World War and became one of the main supporters of the pro-Nazi general. His pro-German stance made him unpopular however, especially as the war neared its end. As a result, he joined Aleksandar Tsankov in accepting German-sponsored exile in Vienna in 1944 and he served out the war there. After the war Dochev was given three separate death sentences in absentia for crimes such as sending Jews to extermination camps whilst mayor of Silistra although he denied committing the crimes.

The sentences were not carried out however as he remained in exile and before long he returned to political activism, with his journal Bulgaria appearing in Salzburg in 1945 followed by the formation of the virulently anti-communist Bulgarian National Front in 1947. Meanwhile, in 1948 he was awarded a doctorate by the University of Heidelberg for a thesis on the Bulgarian economy. Dochev had intended to settle in Germany but the waiting period for German citizenship was too long and so he emigrated to Canada in 1951.

== North American activity ==
Dochev continued his political activity in Canada, organising the Bulgarian National Front both there and in the United States as soon as he arrived in 1951. His new journal Borba soon became central to anti-communist activity amongst North America-based Bulgarians.

Eventually Dochev moved to the United States and settled in New York City. Whilst there he became Bulgarian National President of the Anti-Bolshevik Bloc of Nations to which his Bulgarian National Front was affiliated. In 1982 he published the book Half century struggle against communism for the freedom of Bulgaria, detailing his political activities.

== Final years ==
Dochev, by then Honorary Chairman of the Bulgarian National Front, returned to Bulgaria late in 1991, still unsure about whether or not his death sentence continued to stand, with even President Zhelyu Zhelev uncertain. By this time he claimed to be a supporter of the Union of Democratic Forces although he also stated that he retained the same political ideas that he had had in the Legions. Ultimately he faced no sentence and Dochev—99 years old—died in 2005.
