= Razgrad incident =

Attack on cemetery in 1933

Razgrad Incident or Razgrad Events
- Native name: Razgrad olayları, Razgrad vahşeti, Razgrad hadisesi or Razgrad provokasyonu
- Location: Razgrad, Bulgaria
- Date: 14 April 1933
- Weapons: Axes and shovels
- Victims: 150 dead bodies were exhumed and humiliated
- Perpetrator: Rodna Zashtita (Defence of the Fatherland) organization
- No. of participants: 200
- Motive: Bulgarian nationalism, Islamophobia, Anti-Turkish sentiment

Razgrad Incident refers to the destruction of the Turkish cemetery in Razgrad, Bulgaria. Tombstones were broken and buried bodies were exhumed and humiliated. Axes and shovels were used for the destruction. The incident created numerous rallies in both Turkey and Bulgaria and created discontent in both countries on the eve of the Balkan Pact. Although Ankara and Sofia were able to quickly restore relations, the situation increased nationalism in both countries and affected their minorities.

From a journalistic point of view, three Turks in Bulgaria who were at the center of the spread of the news either illegally left the country or were expelled.

== Background ==
Razgrad is located in the Ludogorie (Deliorman) region, where a large number of ethnic Turks live. After the 1923 Bulgarian coup d'état minority schools (including Turkish) were closed, nationalism gained more popularity in Bulgaria, in 1932 there was a pogrom against the Turkish minority in Kesarevo and in 1933 Feyzi Efendi, the governor of Krumovgrad (Koşukavak) was assassinated and killed.

== History ==
Although some claims that the attack was carried out on 16, 17 or 20 April, according to original sources it happened on 14 April on Easter. On the night of April 14 to April 15, 200-350 members of the Bulgarian organization Rodna Zashtita (Bulgarian: Родна защита) (the Defense of the Fatherland), a Bulgarian paramilitary organization, burned down the watchman's cabin and attacked the local Turkish cemetery with axes and shovels. All tombstones were destroyed, and 150 newly buried bodies and human bones were exhumed and humiliated. The attack caused a great panic among the Turkish population of Razgrad, who cried all night in the cemetery. Due to the attack, part of the population of the city and region emigrated to Romania to go to Turkey.

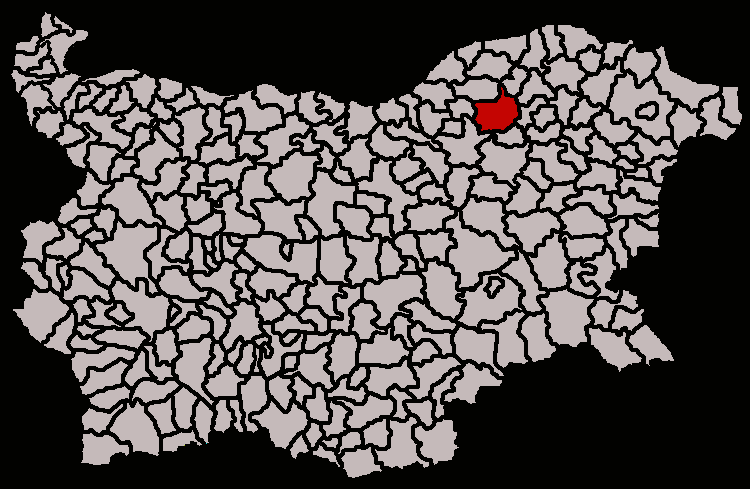
Razgrad in a map

The attack gained popularity when Razgrad journalist Mahmut Necmettin Deliorman and Arif Necib found out about it and published it in their newspapers. Necib's father, who died a week before the incident, was also buried in Razgrad. The two sent protest telegrams to the highest governing bodies of the country, chairmen of political parties and parliamentary groups, wrote letters to some foreign embassies and correspondents, including the Turkish ambassador and correspondent Tevfik Kamil Bey.

The popularization of the events caused unrest among Bulgarians in Razgrad, who created a rally. The protesting Bulgarians claimed that the Bulgarian and Turkish peoples were friends and that the attack was a provocation; they also accused Necmettin Deliorman of spreading the news about the attack. The Razgrad Bulgarians and the authorities began attacking the Turkish population; among the wounded was the Razgrad mufti.

== Reaction ==
=== In Bulgaria ===
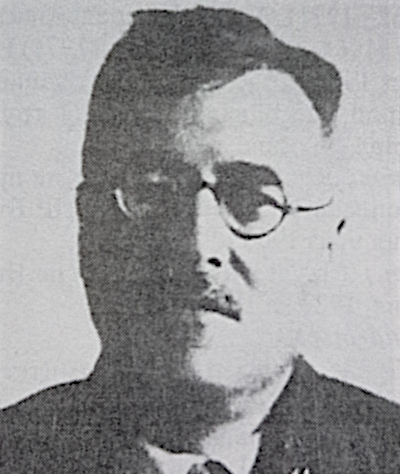
Krastyo Pastuhov

When Bulgarian newspapers such as Utro and Zora wrote about the incident, it created a crisis in the Bulgarian parliament between the leftists and the right-wing. 60 Bulgarians were detained, of whom 20 were arrested. On the same month they were released. Bulgarian authorities did not deny the attack on the Turkish cemetery but accused the Turkish press of exaggerating the event. Slovo, another Bulgarian press called Turkey's reaction a provocation. Krastyo Pastuhov, who blamed Bulgarian nationalist said: "What do you plan to do to prevent our relations with the Republic of Turkey from deteriorating? The incident should not only be closed with an apology, but also the culprits should be found."

The government issued a statement that the attack was not done intentionally and was not supported by the state. In a later statement made by the Bulgarian government it was claimed that the Turkish Cemetery was located within the land expropriated for a park planned to be built in Razgrad, but since the Turks did not comply with the decision to evacuate the area and continued to use it as a cemetery, a group of Bulgarians decided to "accelerate the expropriation decision".

The Turkish national team wanted to cancel the Bulgarian-Turkish football match in Sofia. A few days after the Razgrad Incident, a Turk was hanged in Kardzhali and 5 Turks were arrested in Razgrad. Anadolu Agency's Sofia correspondent center was transferred from Sofia to Bucharest since Ali Naci Bey was subjected to pressure from official Bulgarian authorities for reporting the Razgrat Incident to Turkey. The Razgrad journalist, who first reported the attack, Mahmut Deliorman who hid for days in a Razgrad village, was later detained in Varna, taken to Razgrad, where a protesting Bulgarian crowd tried to lynch him. Released thanks to a conversation with Prime Minister Nikola Mushanov and the Turkish ambassador in Sofia, Deliorman was soon beaten to near death and thrown into a sewer hole by members of the Committee for Free Thrace. Later he and Arif Necib illegally fled to Turkey.

=== In Turkey ===
The news were met with discontent and fury in Turkey. The leader of the National Turkish Student Union organized a protest in Istanbul. On 20 April Darülfünun students also organized a protest in front of the Bulgarian consulate in Maçka. After the speech in front of the consulate, the group marched to the Bulgarian Cemetery in Feriköy and, under the leadership of Ahmet Tevfik İleri, laid a wreath on the Bulgarian graves and sprinkled flowers on them. İleri later said "we do not insult the dead, we respect them." Due to organizing a protest without the state's consent 80 students were detained, 23 of whom were arrested. They were released with the general amnesty on 15 November 1933.

Youth organizations in Izmir showed dissatisfaction both with the attack in Razgrad and with the arresting of Turkish students by the Turkish government. They sent telegrams, requesting Atatürk to the release of the detainees. Another Youth organization in Düzce also sent a telegram to a newspaper, where they condemned the Razgrad Incident. Teachers in Adana organized a protest as well. The Kingdom of Greece, around 200 Bulgarian dental students in Istanbul, Belgrade consulate in Turkey condemned the event, the Times covered the attack as well.

The Turkish newspaper Cumhuriyet covered the incident and called it "an unbelievable event in Bulgaria" and claimed that "around 150 bodies were exhumed". Other newspapers that covered the topic were Deliorman (first newspaper that covered the incident), Anadolu Ajansı, Karadeniz and Trakya; famous columnist and politicians such as Abidin Daver, Necmettin Sadık, Tevfik Rüştü, Peyami Safa, and Yunus Nadi dedicated various articles for the incident. In one of them Yunus Nadi wrote:

Knowing that the Deliorman Turks are a very hard-working, honorable and truly brave element in Bulgaria makes our sorrow for this terrible incident even stronger. Let us also add that although it is quite natural for us to be saddened by any Turks, no matter where they are in the world, if the cemetery that was attacked in Razgrad was not a Turkish Cemetery, we would still use such language to reject and condemn the incident with the same force and conviction. There is no meaning is attacking any cemetery out of blue. The incident is bad even from a human standpoint. We hope that the Bulgarian government will not delay in repairing this rude action that is necessary for the honor and dignity of the Bulgarian nation.

== Aftermath ==
The attack raised ethno-nationalism in both countries. One year after the incident, Thracian Jews were attacked, and the Turkish language campaign became even more popular. On 2 August the Turbe of Demir Baba was attacked by the Bulgarians. A year later 32,6% of settlement toponyms and 14,4% of town toponyms in Bulgaria were renamed.

İsmet İnönü visited Bulgaria in September 1933. Besides negotiations about neutrality he was in Razgrad as well with the aim of getting a closer look at the attack and finding out about the situation of the Turkish minority in the country. İnönü's mother was an ethnic Turkish woman from Razgrad.
