= Anti-Bolshevik Bloc of Nations =

International anti-communist organization

- Abbreviation: ABN
- Predecessor: Committee of Subjugated Nations (CSN)
- Formation: November 21, 1943; 82 years ago (CSN); April 16, 1946; 80 years ago (ABN)
- Founder: Yaroslav Stetsko and Slava Stetsko
- Founded at: Zhytomyr, Reichskommissariat Ukraine (CSN); Munich, American occupation zone in Germany (ABN)
- Dissolved: 1996; 30 years ago (Note: The ABN's magazine, ABN Correspondence, continued publication through 2000.)
- Type: Political organization
- Headquarters: Munich, Germany (1946-1996)

Anti-Bolshevik Bloc of Nations (ABN) was an international anti-communist organization founded as a coordinating center for anti-communist and nationalist émigré political organizations from Soviet and other socialist countries.

The organization was initially known as the Committee of Subjugated Nations (CSN), founded as a conference of non-Russians in November 1943. Based in Zhytomyr, the organization, closely tied with the Organization of Ukrainian Nationalists, advocated for collaboration with Nazi Germany in order to achieve the division of the Soviet Union. After World War II, the CSN's leaders re-founded the organization as the Anti-Bolshevik Bloc of Nations in Munich, where it continued to advocate against the Eastern Bloc. It dissolved in 1996, following the end of the Cold War.

== History ==
=== Background ===
==== The OUN ====
In the 1930s, in the region of Galicia which at the time was a part of Poland, the Organization of Ukrainian Nationalists (OUN) had emerged among the Ukrainians of Galicia to fight for independence from Poland. In turn, the OUN had received support from the Abwehr, German military intelligence, in its struggle against Poland, marking the beginning of a relationship with Germany that continued into World War II. The OUN-B faction led by Stepan Bandera had attracted many veterans of the 14th Waffen Grenadier Division of the SS (1st Galician), a Waffen-SS division mostly made up of Ukrainians from the Galicia region. The OUN in Galicia was in conflict with the Polish state in the 1930s, waging a terrorist campaign of bombings and assassinations. During the Second World War, the OUN fought against the Armia Krajowa (Home Army) resistance group for the control of Galicia, a region the OUN saw as part of the future Ukrainian state it wished to establish. Because of this background, Polish emigre groups shunned the ABN, which was regarded as a vehicle for the anti-Polish OUN.

The OUN was described by the historian Anna Holian as a "deeply anti-Semitic" group, citing the OUN's resolution at its Second Great Congress in 1941 that it "combats Jews as the prop of the Muscovite-Bolshevik regime". American journalist Russ Bellant described the OUN's program as: "OUN, even in its postwar publications, has called for ethno-genetically pure Ukrainian territory, which of course is simply calling for purging Jews, Poles, and Russians from what they consider Ukrainian territory." The OUN activists had provided many of the gunmen working for the SS who shot down 90,000 Ukrainian Jews in 1941-42 and that Stetsko had organized a pogrom in Lviv in 1941 that killed thousands of Jews and Poles.

==== The Nazis' eastern policy ====
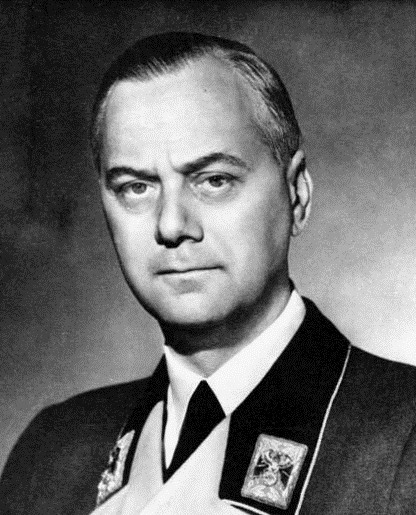
Alfred Rosenberg in his uniform as Minister of the East. What became the ABN was founded at his instigation in 1943.

Alfred Rosenberg, the Minister of the East, had come to identify Russia with the Soviet Union, and Russia in turn with Asia. In contrast to his hostility towards the "Asiatic" Russians, Rosenberg had great hopes of using the non-Russian peoples of the Soviet Union to raise new armies to replace the Wehrmacht's heavy losses on the Eastern Front. Rosenberg favored an approach he called "political warfare", under which Germany would support the independence of the non-Russian peoples to undermine the Soviet Union.

=== Foundation: The Zhytomyr conference ===
According to Stephen Dorril, the Zhytomyr conference of 21–22 November 1943 - where the ABN's forerunner, the Committee of Subjugated Nations (CSN), was established - was part of Rosenberg's "political warfare". Dorril and Mark Aarons argue that the post-war claim that the ABN had been founded as an anti-Nazi and anti-Communist group has no basis in reality as the CSN had been founded by Rosenberg's Ostministerium. At a time when the Red Army was steadily pushing the Wehrmacht back, part of the purpose behind the Anti-Bolshevik Front was to create a framework for waging guerrilla warfare against the Soviets in territories such as Galicia that the Germans expected to lose in the near future.

About the formation of the CSN in 1943, Bellant stated in a 2014 interview:

"The Organization of Ukrainian Nationalists in 1943 under German sponsorship organized a multinational force to fight on behalf of the retreating German army. After the battle of Stalingrad in ’43, the Germans felt a heightened need to get more allies, and so the Romanian Iron Guard, the Hungarian Arrow Cross, the Organization of Ukrainian Nationalists, and others with military formations in place to assist came together and formed the united front called the Committee of Subjugated Nations, and again worked on behalf of the German military. In 1946, they renamed it the Anti-Bolshevik Bloc of Nations or ABN. Stetsko was the leader of that until he died in 1986.
I mention this in part because the OUN tries to say, well, during the war we fought the Germans and the Communists. The fact of the matter is that they were the leadership of this whole multinational alliance on behalf of the Germans the last two years of the war and in the war thereafter. All the postwar leaders of the unrepentant Nazi allies were under the leadership of Yaroslav Stetsko."

Bellant described the ABN as "...the high council for the expatriate nationalist groups that formed the police, military, and militia that worked with Hitler during World War II. Some were organized as mobile killing teams that exterminated villages and sought to murder whole ethnic, racial and cultural groups". Bellant described the ABN as a coordinating group for genocidal collaborationist groups from eastern Europe. In support of this claim, Bellant noted the Byelorussian Central Council of the ABN was a continuation of the Central Rada set up by the German authorities in 1941, and that policemen serving the Central Rada played a decisive role in exterminating the Jewish community of Belarus in 1941–43. When Romania signed the armistice with the Allies in August 1944, the German government set up a Romanian "government-in-exile" headed by Sima of the Iron Guard, and the Romanian Liberation Movement led by Sima was a direct continuation of the "government-in-exile" that had existed in 1944–45. The leadership of the Croatian Liberation Movement of the ABN was led by men who served in the Independent State of Croatia in 1941–45, and most of the men leading the World Federation of Free Latvians had served in the SS and "had assisted the Nazis in exterminating the Jews of their Baltic homeland". The Bulgarian National Front of the ABN led by Ivan Dochev was a continuation of the Union of Bulgarian National Legions, where Dochev had begun his political career.

The driving force at the Zhytomyr conference was the Organization of Ukrainian Nationalists. During the conference, a platform of joint revolutionary struggles against what the participants called Russian communism was formulated. The goal of the ABN was to remove Communists from power, abolish the Soviet Union and divide it into national states.

=== From Zhytomyr to Munich ===
After the war, the loyalty of men with military experience from Galicia, the eastern part of which had just reincorporated back into the Soviet Union, led British military intelligence agency MI6 to see the OUN as possibly useful for subversion against the Soviet Union. For two years after World War II, the UPA, the guerrilla military arm of the OUN waged a guerrilla war in Galicia against the Soviet and Polish authorities.

The OUN comprised the largest contingent in the ABN, and the majority of the OUN members came from Galicia. Given an organizational structure in Munich in 1946 sponsored by MI6, the ABN extended its range of activity and began to include Eastern European emigration from other countries apart from Ukraine. In its founding statement in April 1946, the ABN declared "Bolshevism is the criminal theory and practice of terroristic nonparty dictatorship which excluded even the slightest bit of freedom, democracy and nationality". The ABN declared the Soviet Union to be the "prison of nations", and announced that the break-up of the Soviet Union was its principal goal. As a part of its critique of the USSR, the ABN identified the Soviet Union with Russia, presenting Soviet policies as merely a continuum of the policies of Imperial Russia. Typical of this viewpoint was an ABN pamphlet which stated: "Aggressive and destructive Bolshevism merely exhibits a new, higher form of Russian imperialism, which grew across the centuries by conquering foreign lands and subjecting foreign peoples in Europe as well as in Asia". The ABN presented Russians as biologically different from the rest of humanity, portraying the Russians as having a genetic predisposition towards extreme violence and aggression. The ABN argued that the peoples of Eastern Europe were white and thus had a "natural" love of freedom while the Russians were portrayed as having a "natural" inclination towards cruel despotism owing to an unfortunate infusion of Asian genes going back to the Mongol conquest of Russia in the 13th century. Because of what the ABN argued was this biological difference between the white peoples of Eastern Europe vs. the Russians whose Asian genes had deformed them, the ABN excluded Russia from the list of nations it wished to liberate. Throughout its existence, the ABN equated Russians and Communism as one and the same, engaging in propaganda that sought to "demonize" Russians as an utterly evil people for whom no redemption was possible.

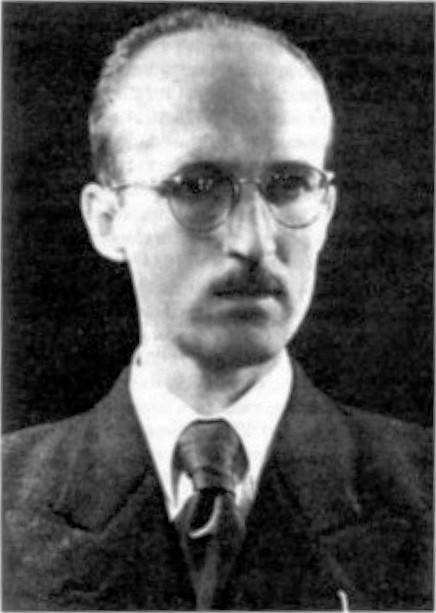
Yaroslav Stetsko, the leader of the ABN from 1946 to 1986

The ABN envisioned a federation of independent states in eastern Europe after it broke up the Soviet Union to be called the "New Order". All of these states were to be "ethnically pure" with no place for minorities. As such, all of the minorities were to "return" to their proper homelands once the "New Order" was established. In particular, there was to be no place for Jews, who were portrayed as an "alien" people who did not belong in any of the envisioned states. Holian wrote that ABN tended to say little about the "Jewish question" after 1945 largely because of the "Final Solution" had largely "solved" the "Jewish question" by exterminating most of the once vast Jewish communities in Eastern Europe, but the group's ideology about the "Jewish Question" largely reflected the OUN's thinking on the subject.

=== Cold War ===
The most active groups among the Bloc were the Ukrainian national organizations. According to Dorril, in 1946–1947, with Anglo-American support, the OUN-B's secret police, the Sluzhba Bezpeky, conducted Operation Ohio, an assassination campaign in displaced persons camps in western Germany. The victims were suspected Soviet agents, members of rival Ukrainian groups, and those who knew too much about the collaborationist background of the ABN's leaders. One American, the controversial ex-military commentator and conspiracy theorist L. Fletcher Prouty, recalled that the assassins "were the best commercial hitmen you ever heard of".

The ABN was headed by Yaroslav Stetsko, a Ukrainian nationalist who supported the Holocaust and anti-Soviet politician, from the time of foundation until 1986, the year of his death. Stetsko was succeeded by his widow, Slava Stetsko. She wrote the foreword to the 1969 book Captive Nations-our first line of defense by Bailey Bernadine that offered the following political definitions:

- Anti-semitism: A smear word used by the Communists against those who effectively oppose and expose them
- Fascist: An anti-Communist
- Nazi or Hitlerite: An active anti-Communist

In her foreword, she praised Captive Nations as "objective, factual" and "highly recommended".

In 1950, Stetsko hosted an ABN conference in Edinburgh funded by MI6 that Dorril describes as attended by several collaborators such as Alfrēds Bērziņš of Latvia; Dr. Stanislaw Stankievich who had headed the Belarusian Central Council; and Veli Kayyum Khan of the National Turkestan Unity Committee. Representing Romania at the conference was the Legion of the Archangel Michael (better known as the Iron Guard); Bulgaria the Bulgarian National Front and Croatia members of the Ustaše. The conference attracted much publicity in Britain, most of it very favorable. Stetsko stated the ABN was ready and willing to fight and claimed to be able to "set up an army of more than ten million soldiers" to fight against the Soviet Union. A number of Polish emigre groups, which had boycotted the Edinburgh conference out of distaste for the OUN, accused the ABN of ignoring the "harsh reality" of Eastern Europe, namely that the vast military forces the ABN claimed to command did not exist. A press release issued by the Polish government-in-exile in London denounced the ABN, saying there was "no opportunity to shake off the hated Bolshevik yoke...Today, any active measures against Russia would be lunacy; it would only bring bloody repression, massacres, and mass deportations, without even the slightest hope of achieving the aim so much desired".

As early as 1951, the American anti-Stalinist magazine The New Leader ran a two-part series under the title "Allies We Don't Need"; the series documented that the ABN was founded at the instigation of Rosenberg's Ostministerium in 1943, and that nearly all the ABN leaders had been on the Axis side. Under a photograph of Rosenberg with the caption "His memory lingers on", the article translated extreme anti-Russian ABN statements that were a direct continuation of wartime Ostministerium propaganda such as one ABN pamphlet that stated the Russians have "never been able to form an order of society worthy of human beings". Such criticism had some effect; the United States government which had initially supported the ABN came to shun it, saying that Stetsko had "totalitarian tendencies", not the least of which was his habit of ordering the assassinations of rivals. Furthermore, the American government came to feel that Stetsko was "too extreme" as his stated aim was to provoke World War III, arguing that this was the best way to achieve his aim of breaking up the Soviet Union. The possibility of a nuclear war killing hundreds of millions of people and that a Soviet-American nuclear exchange would turn Eastern Europe into a radioactive wasteland did not concern Stetsko or any of the other ABN leaders. By the mid-1950s, both the British and American governments had ceased to subsidize the ABN, which was regarded as too dangerous.

The American historian Richard Rashke wrote that the ABN had "at least a dozen well known Nazi collaborators" on its board of directors. The chairmen of the ABN Peoples' Council included A. Bērziņš, V. Kajum-Khan, F. Ďurčanský, F. Farkas de Kisbarnak, and R. Ostrowski. The head of the Romanian Liberation Movement affiliated with the ABN was Horia Sima, formerly the leader of the Iron Guard. The long-time general secretaries were Dr. Niko Nakashidze and C. Pokorný. Bērziņš was a Latvian who served as an obersturmführer in the SS and was accused of torturing and murdering 2, 000 Jews. Also sitting on the ABN's board was Edward O'Connor, a former member of the American National Security Council who had favored using emigre groups to break-up the Soviet Union. O'Connor has been described as the "single most important activist" in the ABN. A number of Holocaust deniers such as Austin App, the author of The Six Million Swindle were ABN members.

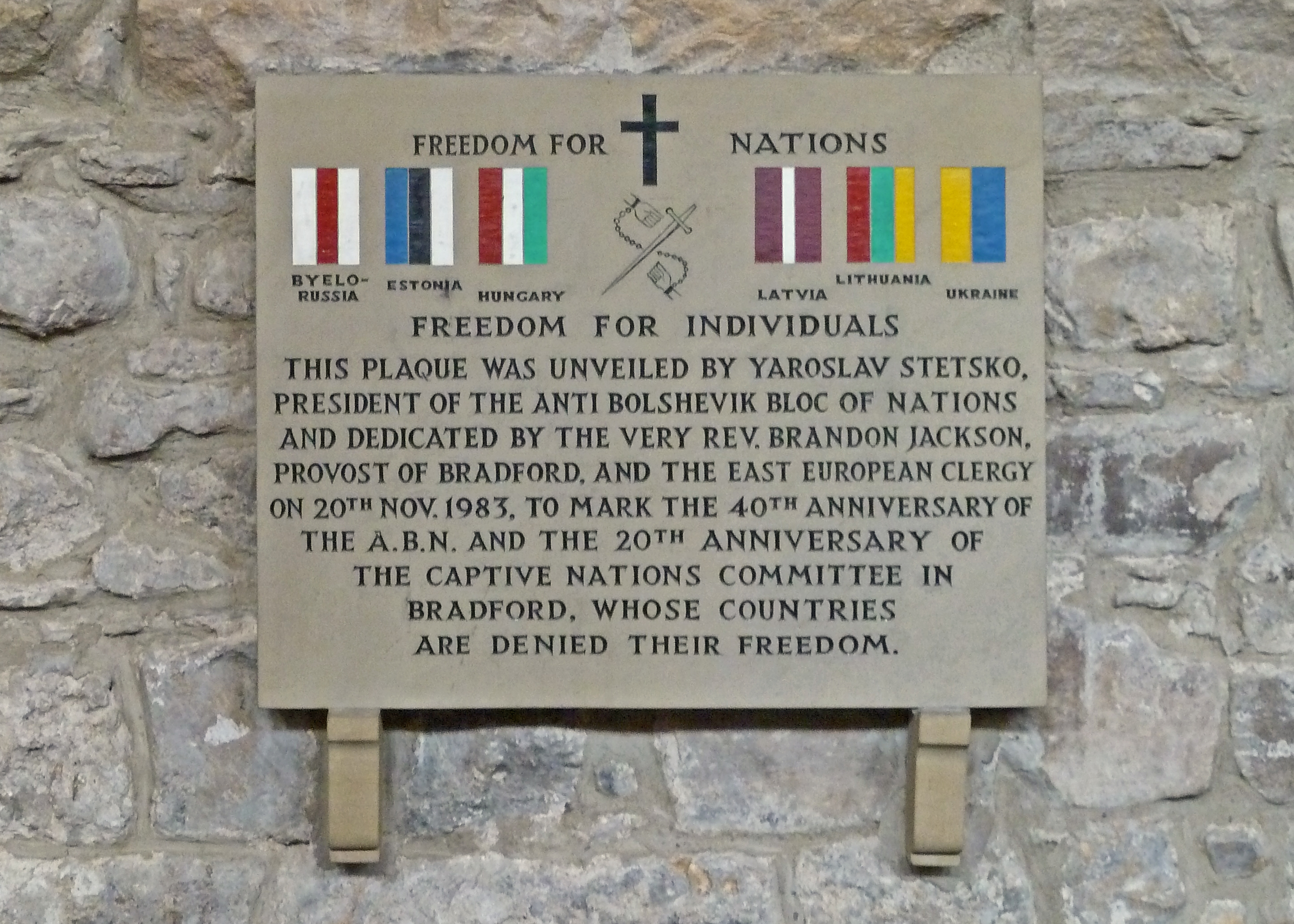
Plaque unveiled by Yaroslav Stetsko, president of the Anti-Bolshevik Bloc of Nations at Bradford Cathedral

The headquarters and cells of the ABN organized mass anti-Soviet rallies, protest demonstrations, press conferences, and international congresses, and the distribution of various memoranda. ABN activists held rallies outside of Soviet embassies and consulates; led boycott campaigns against department stores selling goods made in Eastern Europe; pressured school boards and libraries to remove books they considered to be pro-Communist; threw eggs at Soviet diplomats, and lobbied politicians. The ABN co-operated with the World Anti-Communist League (WACL) and the European Freedom Council (EFC). The ABN's magazine, ABN Correspondence, frequently praised wartime collaborationist leaders such as Ante Pavelić of Croatia and Father Jozef Tiso of Slovakia as "freedom fighters" against Communism. In the United States, ABN excelled at political organizing among Americans who were either immigrants from Eastern Europe and descended from immigrants from Eastern Europe. The ABN came to enjoy a certain power in the United States as many Americans of Eastern European background voted for candidates endorsed by the ABN, causing both Democratic and Republican politicians to court the favor of the ABN. ABN activists in the United States supported politicians who took the most extreme anti-Communist line such as Republican Senator Joseph McCarthy who in turn lavished praise upon the ABN. Besides for the United States, the ABN also came to enjoy power in Canada in the 1950s when there was a significant Ukrainian-Canadian population who voted for candidates endorsed by the ABN.

In March 1958, at a conference in Mexico City, the ABN united with the Asian People's Anti-Communist League, the Committee of One Million Against the Admission of Red China, and the Inter-American Confederation for the Defense of the Continent to form the World Anti-Communist Congress for Liberation and Freedom. The Asian People's Anti-Communist League was an organization supported clandestinely by the governments of the Republic of China (Taiwan), South Korea, the Philippines, and South Vietnam. The ABN wanted an alliance with Asian People's Anti-Communist League largely to get a slice of the money provided by the Asian governments that supported it, and to do so, the ABN toned down the anti-Asian racism that previously characterized it. The cut-off in Anglo-American financial support had caused the ABN serious monetary problems, and thus led the group to seek financing from anti-Communist Asian governments as a way of compensation. The goal of the World Anti-Communist Congress for Liberation and Freedom was to render "moral and material support to forces behind the Iron Curtain in Europe and Asia" and to "achieve the ultimate objective of liberating and restoring national independence, freedom, and liberty to all the enslaved peoples on their ethnic territories". By July 1958, the Congress had collapsed as the leader of the Committee of One Million, Marvin Liebman, had pulled out saying he did not want to work with Stetsko again. Liebman, whose Jewish parents came from Galicia had been shocked to learn Stetsko had been involved in organizing pogroms against Galician Jews in 1941. Liebman called Stetsko and his followers "jerks", stating that Stetsko was an anti-Semite who equated Communism with Jews as he still maintained his belief in "Judeo-Bolshevism". After Liebman left, he started receiving death threats from OUN members calling him a "Jew Bolshevik".

In 1959, the ABN's American branch successfully lobbied Congress to proclaim the public holiday of Captive Nations week and to declare American support for independence for all of the "captive nations" as defined by the ABN. In several states in the Northeast and the Midwest, there were sufficient concentrations of voters influenced by the ABN to give the movement a degree of power as a lobbying group. The resolution was passed unanimously through according to one observer it was "churned out" of Congress "along with casual holiday resolutions such as National Hot Dog Day". The ABN lobbyists help write the resolution, and much of the resolution reflected the ABN's ideas about which nations were "captive nations". The ABN equated Communism in the Soviet Union with Russians, and Russia was conspicuously absent from the list of "captive nations" listed in the resolution. The American journalist Christopher Simpson wrote that two of the "captive nations" mentioned in the resolution, Idel-Ural and Cossackia, were "fictitious entities created as a propaganda ploy by Hitler's racial theoretician Alfred Rosenberg during World War Two".

Public Law 86-90 which established Captive Nations Week in 1959

The American Vice President, Richard Nixon, was visiting Moscow at the time the resolution was passed, and the Soviet leader, Nikita Khrushchev, was extremely angry about the resolution. Khrushchev asked Nixon how it was possible for him to negotiate with a nation that just proclaimed the break-up of his country as its foreign policy goal. Nixon, in effect, was forced to apologize for the resolution, saying that neither he nor President Eisenhower had any control over the resolutions passed by Congress, and stated: "Neither the President nor I would have deliberately chosen to pass a resolution of this type passed just before we visited the USSR". At the time, there was much tension in American-Soviet relations owing to the latest Berlin crisis, and Nixon had been sent to Moscow to find a way to ease tensions in order to end the Berlin crisis peacefully. The general feeling in Eisenhower administration was that the resolution was ill-timed.

The American diplomat George F. Kennan came to deplore the ABN, complaining the group had an over-sized influence over Congress as most congressmen and senators were afraid of being labeled "soft on Communism", and charged that the ABN had a vested interest in inflaming Cold War tensions. Kennan wrote that the ABN in the United States was a classic example of a domestic lobby taking over foreign policy to achieve its own ends, even if those goals were not necessarily in the broader interest of the United States. During his time as the American ambassador to Yugoslavia, Kennan complained that his efforts to influence Marshal Josip Broz Tito to undertake a more pro-American foreign policy were being constantly undercut by the ABN, which successfully lobbied Congress to pass resolutions calling for the overthrow of Tito and for the break-up of Yugoslavia.

From 1962 onward, the ABN worked closely with Lady Birdwood, described as the "largest individual distributor of racist and antisemitic material" in Britain. The leader of the British branch of the European Freedom Council, founded in 1967, was Lady Birdwood. The ABN activists in Britain who worked with Lady Birdwood expressed anti-Semitic and far-right views. Representatives from the ABN and related organizations participated in the congresses of the WACL and EFC.

In November 1967, the ABN organized rallies in Ottawa outside of the Soviet embassy and in Montreal outside of the Soviet consulate to protest the 50th anniversary of the October Revolution. The main speaker at the ABN rally in Ottawa was Stetsko whose speech calling for Ukrainian Independence caused the Ukrainian-Canadian audience to erupt in rapturous joy. At another ABN rally held shortly afterward was attended by the former prime minister, John Diefenbaker, and the Conservative MP Mike Starr, the first Ukrainian-Canadian cabinet minister.

In the 1968 election, a Hungarian-American ABN activist, Laszlo Pasztor, who began his political career as a student activist for the Arrow Cross while attending university in his native Hungary, campaigned hard for the Republican candidate, Richard Nixon. Pasztor had been convicted of crimes against humanity in Hungary in 1946 for his role in the Holocaust in Hungary as he served as a diplomat for the short-lived Arrow Cross regime of 1944–45 in Berlin. In 1969, Nixon rewarded Pasztor by creating the Republican Heritage Groups Council of the Republican National Committee, with Pasztor as its first chairman. Pasztor, in turn, recruited the leaders of ABN-affiliated groups to serve on the Republican Heritage Groups Council, shunning mainstream conservative groups in favor of the fascist groups affiliated with the ABN. For example, the conservative Bulgarian National Committee was denied permission to affiliate with the council, but the fascist Bulgarian National Front led by Ivan Dochev was allowed to join the council. About the leaders of the Heritage Groups Council, Bellant stated: "They didn't have a Russian affiliate because they hated all Russians of all political stripes. There were no African-Americans or Jewish affiliates either. It was just composed of these elements, and for a while, they had a German affiliate, but some exposure of the Nazi character of the German affiliate caused it to be quietly removed, but other [Nazi] elements were retained."

On 21 July 1984, Nikolai Nazarenko, president of the World Federation of the Cossack National Liberation Movement of Cossackia and the Cossack American Republican National Federation, gave a speech at an ABN diner in New York. Nazarenko, who by his own admission spent much of World War II serving as a translator and an interrogator of POWs for the Wehrmacht, praised those who fought for Nazi Germany as heroes. Turning to his main subject, Nazarenko stated: "There is a certain ethnic group that makes its home in Israel. This ethnic group works with the Communists all the time. They were the Fifth Column in Germany and in all the Captive Nations...They would spy, sabotage, and do any act in the interest of Moscow. Of course, there had to be the creation of natural self-defense against this Fifth Column. They had to be isolated. Security was needed. So the Fifth Column was arrested and imprisoned. This particular ethnic group was responsible for aiding the Soviet NKVD. A million of our people were destroyed as a result of them aiding the NKVD...You hear a lot about the Jewish Holocaust, but what about the 140 million Christians, Moslems, and Buddhists killed by Communism? That is the real Holocaust and you never hear about it!" The audience roared its approval and Nazarenko's speech was the best received of the evening.

Nazarenko was accused of executing Red Army POWs and of hanging Jews from the lampposts in Odessa, claims which he denied, though he stated in an interview that Jews were his "ideological enemies". When interviewed by the American journalist Russ Bellant, Nazarenko produced a briefcase full of antisemitic literature on the "Jewish question", Cossack publications and memorabilia from his service in the Wehrmacht. Nazarenko when questioned, denied the Holocaust, saying that "Jews didn't die from gas chambers. Those mountains of bones are from people who starved to death or died of disease". Despite his views, Nazarenko took part in Captive Nations day parades in his Cossack uniform and as the president of the Cossack American Republican National Federation was active in Republican politics.

On 20 July 1988, the Republican candidate for the presidency, Vice President George H. W. Bush, spoke at an ABN rally in the company of a Ukrainian emigre and OUN/ABN member, Bohdan Fedorak. Fedorak, who served as president of Ukrainians for Bush, organized the rally at the Ukrainian Cultural Center in Warren, Michigan. At the rally, Fedorak denounced the Office of Special Investigations (OSI), which was in charge of investigating and deporting Nazi war criminals from the United States. Bellant recalled in 2014 about Bush's campaign appearance: "So they denounced them, the OSI investigations, in front of Bush. Bush nodded his head, but he wouldn't say anything because he didn't want to sound like he was sympathetic to the Nazi war criminals, but at the same time he didn't want to offend his hosts by disputing the issue with them."

=== Post Cold War ===
The Anti-Bolshevik Bloc of Nations was disbanded in 1996 after the collapse of the USSR and Soviet communism.

There are many splinter groups, and heirs, to the former ABN organization around the world. In Ukraine, the Congress of Ukrainian Nationalists, founded in 1992, is perhaps the most notable, as it was led by Yaroslava Stetsko, Yaroslav's wife, until her demise in 1993.

In 2016, ideas began to materialise for the resurrection of the international ABN organisation, now with a stronger focus on anti-Russian anti-imperialism, and less on anti-communism. Later on, these ideas materialised in the Anti-Imperial Block of Nations (ABN), amongst other groups, celebrating the legacy of the Anti-Bolshevik Bloc of Nations and advocating for the independence of minorities in Russia, and the dissolution of the Russian Federation. Other international heirs of the former ABN is Free Nations League (FNL), also known as League of Free Nations.

== Members ==
Member organisation for various times:

- Belarusian Central Rada (Belarus)
- Bulgarian National Front (Bulgaria)
- Cossack National Liberation Movement (see Cossacks)
- Croatian Liberation Movement (Croatia)
- Czech National Committee (Czech Republic): Lev Prchala
- Estonian Liberation Movement (Estonia)
- "Free Armenia" Committee (Armenia)
- Georgian National Organization (Georgia)
- Hungarian Liberation Movement (Hungary)
- Hungarian Mindszenty Movement
- Latvian Association for the Struggle against Communism (Latvia)
- Lithuanian Rebirth Movement (Lithuania)
- National Turkestanian Unity Committee (Turkestan)
- Organization of Ukrainian Nationalists-Bandera (Ukraine)
- Ukrainian Supreme Liberation Council (Ukraine)
- Slovak Liberation Committee (Slovakia)
- Romanian Liberation Movement (Romania)
- Union of the Estonian Fighters for Freedom (Estonia)
- United Hetman Organization (see Hetman)
- World Federation of the Cossack National Liberation Movement of Cossackia (Cossackia)

== Selected publications ==
Periodicals

- ABN Correspondence: Bulletin of the Anti-Bolshevik Bloc of Nations (1950-2000). ISSN 0001-0545. OCLC 1718908.

Pamphlets and flyers

- Letters from Political Prisoners. Munich: Ukrainian Information Service & Press Bureau of the Anti-Bolshevik Bloc of Nations (ABN) (1975).
- Cultural Exchanges and Cooperation: The Double-faced Policy. London: The ABN Delegation in Great Britain (1979).
- Stetsko, Yaroslav. Revolutionary and Reactionary Forces in the World. Munich: Press Bureau of Anti-Bolshevik Bloc of Nations (ABN) (1981).

== See also ==
- Anti-Bolshevist League
- Congress of the Enslaved Peoples of Russia
- Free Nations of Post-Russia Forum
- League for the Liberation of the Peoples of the USSR
- World Anti-Communist League
