= Spas T. Raikin =

Bulgarian historian and anti-communist (1922-2014)

- Спас Райкин
- Born: Spas Todorov Raikin; 22 October 1922; Zelenikovo, Plovdiv Province, Bulgaria
- Died: 18 February 2014 (aged 91); Stroudsburg, Pennsylvania, U.S.
- Education: Sofia University; Columbia University
- Occupations: Historian, activist

Spas Todorov Raikin (Bulgarian: Спас Тодоров Райкин; 22 October 1922 – 18 February 2014) was a Bulgarian historian and anti-communist activist. His historical work focused primarily on the history of the Bulgarian Orthodox Church both prior to and during the Communist era.

== Early and personal life ==
Raikin was born in Zelenikovo, 26 October 1922. He studied theology at the seminary in Plovdiv and at Sofia University, before defecting in 1951 by crossing the Greek border. Prior to his defection he had briefly been a member of the ultranationalist, monarchist Union of Bulgarian National Legions. He eventually reached New York and studied political science at Columbia University.

Raikin died in Stroudsburg on 18 February 2014, aged 91. He was survived by his wife Rudy, two children, and two grandchildren.

== Career ==
He held a professorship at East Stroudsburg University and upon retirement became professor emeritus. His papers are held at the Hoover Archive of the Hoover Institution. He was also involved with the Church World Service and the World Council of Churches.

In 1957 he was hired by the Joint Publications Research Service. For this role he was given a CIA clearance, as Raikin was under contract with the CIA, although without being informed of his true employer. Raikin wrote letters to the head of the CIA, Allen Dulles, and the head of the FBI, J. Edgar Hoover, sending them material from various organizations he was involved with.

Raikin was a member of the far-right Bulgarian National Front (BNF) until 1964 and the editor of the group's newspaper 'Borba' (Struggle). One of the things Raikin did during his involvement with the BNF was approach new arrivals from Europe and attempt to recruit them for the organization. He was also Secretary-General of the 'American Friends of the Anti-Bolshevik Bloc of Nations' from 1960 till 1962. In this capacity he established contacts with the Asian Peoples' Anti-Communist League.

In 2001, he published his memoir Rebel with a Just Cause: A Political Journey against the Winds of the 20th Century.

=== Lee Harvey Oswald ===
Beginning in 1962 Raikin was involved in the Travellers Aid Society. He met with Lee Harvey Oswald and his family upon his return to the United States from the USSR at the port of Hoboken, New Jersey, after being contacted by the US Department of State. Raikin encountered difficulties attempting to locate Oswald when he arrived at the port. He boarded the ship and paged Oswald, but to no avail. He asked the officer in charge about his whereabouts and according to Raikin "He looked at me as if I had hit him on the head. Then he asked, 'Why are you interested in him?'". Eventually Oswald was located and he took him and his family to the New York City Department of Welfare where they were processed. Raikin recalls that Oswald was tight-lipped and that "It was like pulling teeth to get information out of him". Oswald misled Raikin about his defection to the Soviet Union, he claimed that he had been a Marine on duty in the U.S. Embassy in Moscow when he met a Russian girl and defected. In reality, Oswald was never stationed in the embassy and did not meet his wife Marina until after he had defected. He added he had been misled by Soviet propaganda and that things were not as he had thought they were in the USSR.

== Media portrayals ==
The character of 'Stephen Raikin' in the film Journey to Freedom (1957) by Bulgarian filmmaker Stephen C. Apostolof takes his surname from Raikin and shares many biographical similarities to him.

Raikin is played by Warren Mitchell in Lee Oswald - Assassin (1966), an episode of the BBC series Play of the Month.

== Bibliography ==
- The communists and the Bulgarian orthodox church, 1944–48: The rise and fall of Exarch Stefan (1984) in Religion in Communist Lands, Vol. 12 Issue no. 3, pp. 281–292.
- Nationalism and the Bulgarian Orthodox Church (1988) in Religion and Nationalism in Soviet and East European Politics ed. by Pedro Ramet, pp. 187-207.
- Successes and Failures of Atheism in Bulgaria: Part 1 (1988) in RCDA: Religion in Communist Dominated Areas, Vol 27 Issue 2, pp. 55-63.
- The Predicaments of the Bulgarian Orthodox Church Today (1992) in Occasional Papers on Religion in Eastern Europe: Vol. 12, Iss. 1.
- The Schism in the Bulgarian Orthodox Church, 1992–1997 (1998) in Bulgaria In Transition: Politics, Economics, Society, And Culture After Communism ed. by John D. Bell.
