= Yunus Nadi Abalıoğlu =

Turkish journalist (1879–1945)

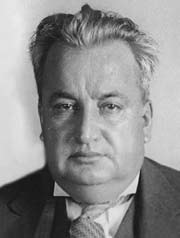
- Born: 1879; Fethiye, Ottoman Empire
- Died: 1945 (aged 65–66); Turkey
- Education: Istanbul University
- Occupation: Journalist
- Known for: Founding the newspaper Cumhuriyet
- Political party: Committee of Union and Progress; Turkish Communist Party (official)

Yunus Nadi Abalıoğlu (1879 – 28 June 1945) was a Turkish journalist and the founder of the newspaper Cumhuriyet. He was known for his support for Turkish nationalism and his sympathies with the Nazi regime, publishing many anti-semitic propaganda articles in praise of Adolf Hitler.

== Early life ==
Yunus Nadi was born to Hadji Halil Efendi and Ayse Hanim in Fethiye, modern-day Muğla Province. He attended primary school in Fethiye, at Süleymaniye Madrasa in Rhodes, high school at Galatasaray High School in Istanbul, and university at İstanbul Law School, where he began writing for the literary magazine Malumat.

During his time in law school, Yunus Nadi became involved in dissident activity against Sultan Abdul Hamid II. As a result, Yunus Nadi was arrested in 1902, in his second year. He spent three years in prison before being released on December 28, 1904. After his release, he was exiled to his hometown of Fethiye, where he worked as a lawyer. It was during this time that he married Nazime Hanım, the daughter of a local customs officer.

== Constitutional period ==
When the constitutional monarchy was restored, Yunus Nadi returned to Istanbul, where he worked for İkdam as a translator and Tasvîr-i Efkâr as a writer and editor. Eventually, he left his position at Tasvîr-i Efkâr to become editor-in-chief at Rumeli, a Thessaloniki publication.

In 1912, Yunus Nadi was elected to represent Aydın in the Ottoman Chamber of Deputies, a position he held for six terms.

Yunus Nadi was a strong supporter of the Committee of Union and Progress, which perpetrated the Armenian genocide. He wrote in support of the genocide in a 1916 article for Tasvîr-i Efkâr, describing the polycommunal solidarity of the Ottoman state as having been proven “bankrupt” and commending the “clean-up of the fatherland.”

== Turkish War of Independence ==
After the dissolution of the Chamber of Deputies, Yunus Nadi founded his own newspaper, Yeni Gün (lit. 'New Day') in 1918. Yeni Gün, which acted as the mouthpiece for the Committee of Union and Progress and eventually the Government of the Grand National Assembly led by Mustafa Kemal, initially operated in Istanbul, but after facing censorship under the occupation, eventually moved to Ankara in 1920 and Kayseri during the Battle of Sakarya in 1921.

Yunus Nadi also served in the Grand National Assembly as the deputy for İzmir and founded the Anadolu Agency in 1920 alongside writer Halide Edip. The agency was backed by Mustafa Kemal, who provided initial support and personally reviewed several of the Agency’s articles before publication. The Agency worked extensively with Yeni Gün to provide coverage during the Battle of Sakarya. After the founding of the Turkish Communist Party, Yunus Nadi became editor of Anadoluda Yeni Gün, the party's newspaper.

Yunus Nadi’s writing during this time was characterized by its militant nationalism and antipathy toward the Istanbul Government. In 1921, he wrote that “if necessary, we will also cover Istanbul in blood from one end to the other,” and that those “miserable souls who wanted a sultan and a padishah” could “choke in their own blood.”

After the Treaty of Lausanne was signed on July 24, 1923, Yunus Nadi became chairman of the committee tasked with writing the new constitution, and on October 29, 1923, on the day of the establishment of the Republic, he gave a speech before the Grand National Assembly discussing its articles.

== Republican period ==
With the establishment of the Republic, the new government sought ways to spread its propaganda in Istanbul. After a failed meeting between Mustafa Kemal and a group of Istanbul journalists, Kemal endorsed the creation of a new republican newspaper titled Cumhuriyet (lit. ‘The Republic’). Yunus Nadi began working for the new paper in 1924, leaving his position at Yeni Gün. Cumhuriyet served as the primary government mouthpiece for the Kemalist regime for over a decade, but lost government support after the death of Kemal in 1938.

Yunus Nadi was known for his coverage of the Razgrad incident in 1933, in which the Turkish cemetery in Razgrad, Bulgaria was destroyed. The attacks were undertaken by Rodna Zashtita, a Bulgarian nationalist group targeting Turks and Jews in Bulgaria. Yunus Nadi wrote in favor of the government of Bulgarian prime minister Nikola Mushanov, expressing a hope for friendship and open dialogue.

With the rise of the Nazi Party in Germany, Cumhuriyet’s coverage began to trend antisemitic, with Yunus Nadi writing several pieces in 1938 about an alleged Jewish boycott of the formerly Armenian-owned Tokatlian Hotel in Istanbul. Yunus Nadi’s antisemitism earned him the nickname “Yunus Nazi,” as well as criticism from fellow journalists Ahmet Emin Yalman and Zekeriya Sertel. It has been alleged that Yunus Nadi was receiving financial remuneration from the Nazi Party and other foreign governments, though this has not been confirmed.

Some have contested that Yunus Nadi held Nazi sympathies, however, claiming that his coverage was generally pro-nationalist but against totalitarianism and expansionism, citing editorials written by Yunus Nadi criticizing the German invasion of Norway and Hitler’s abrogtation of international law. Among the defenders of Cumhuriyet’s coverage was Yunus Nadi’s son, Nadir Nadi, who claimed that Cumhuriyet “maintaned a neutral position vis-à-vis the war.”

Yunus Nadi died in a hospital in Geneva on June 28, 1945, where he was being treated for an illness. He was buried in Edirnekapı Martyr's Cemetery and survived by his son Nadir Nadi, who continued to operate Cumhuriyet after his father’s death.

== Legacy ==
Cumhuriyet has given out Yunus Nadi Awards, named in memory of Yunus Nadi, since 1946. Awards are given for short stories, memoirs, poetry, cartoons, novel research, short anecdotes, children's books, sociology, journalism, photography, and scientific works.
