= MANAPO =

Leftist organization in interwar period

The Macedonian National Movement (Serbo-Croatian and Macedonian: Македонски Национален Покрет, romanized: Makedonski Nacionalen Pokret; Bulgarian: Македонското народно движение; MANAPO) was a leftist movement started in 1936 among the progressive Macedonian students in the Belgrade and Zagreb in the interwar period. It took inspiration from popular front. It considered the Kingdom of Yugoslavia as a "monarcho-fascist dictatorship" and as employing "Greater Serbian hegemony", while also seeking to achieve autonomy for Vardar Macedonia as part of an anti-fascist and federal Yugoslavia. Members, such as Dimitar Gyuzelov and Dimitar Chkatrov, wanted separation from Yugoslavia. Numerous members of the groups subsequently joined Yugoslav Partisans with prominent one being the future first president of independent Macedonia Kiro Gligorov. Other members were Bulgarian nationalists, who became officials during the Bulgarian occupation of Macedonia during World War II. On 26 August 1936 at the University of Zagreb, a group of Macedonian students belonging to the group signed the Political Declaration, a document requesting political and social emancipation of Macedonians in the Kingdom of Yugoslavia.

When MANAPO was dissolved in the beginning of the Second World War, with some of its members entering the ranks of the Communist Party of Yugoslavia, while others felt the aims of the organization had been established with what they perceived as the "liberation" of Vardar Macedonia by Kingdom of Bulgaria in 1941 at the time of Invasion of Yugoslavia.
