= Raikin =

Raikin is a surname. Notable people with the surname include:

- Arkady Raikin (1911–1987), a Soviet stand-up comedian who led the school of Soviet and Russian humorists for about half a century
- Konstantin Raikin (born 1950), a Russian film and theater actor, director of the Moscow Satyricon theater, son of Arkady Raikin
- Spas T. Raikin, Bulgarian anti-communist activist and historian.

Raikin may also mean:

- 4518 Raikin, a minor planet named after Arkady Raikin
