= Ratnici =

Ratnici may refer to:

- Ratniks, a far-right Bulgarian nationalist organization from 1936 to 1944
- Warriors (band), a Yugoslav and later Canadian heavy metal band from 1982 to 1986
