= Violeta Yakova =

Bulgarian communist partisan (1923–1944)

Violeta Jakova
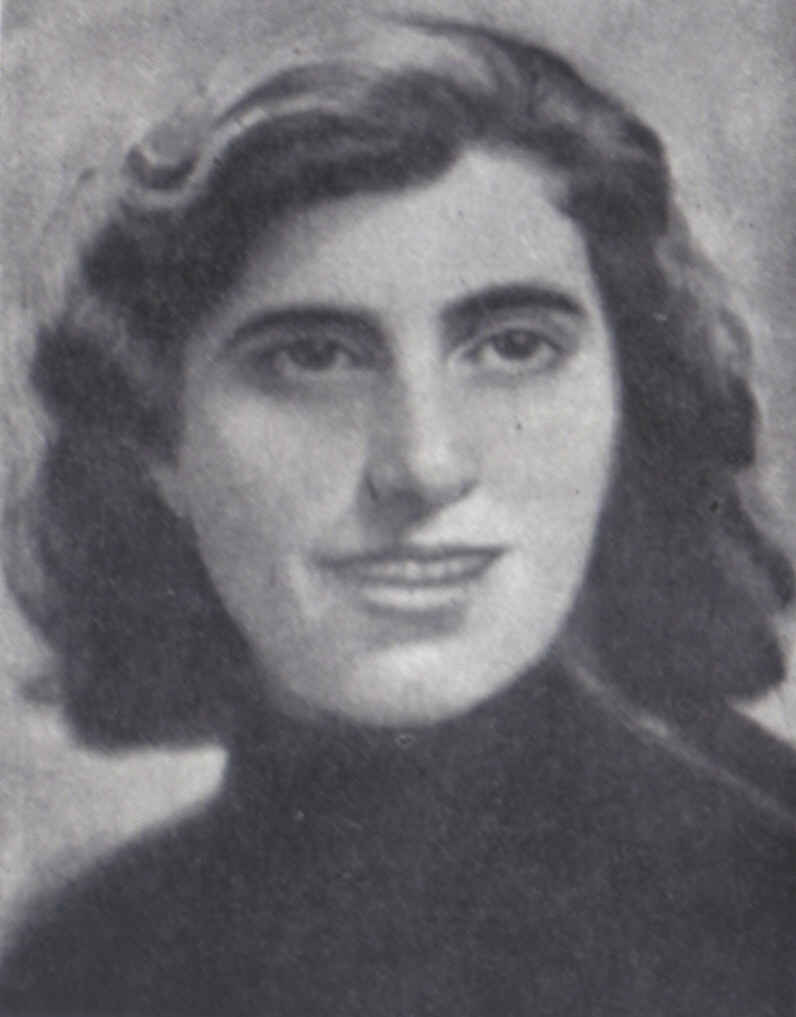
- Born: June 2, 1923; Dupnitsa, Kingdom of Bulgaria
- Died: June 18, 1944 (aged 21); Radomir, Kingdom of Bulgaria

Violeta Yakova or Violeta Jakova (Bulgarian: Виолета Якова; June 2, 1923 – June 18, 1944) was a partisan and member of the Bulgarian Communist Party. Yakova, whose nom de guerre was "Ivanka", participated in the killings of several German and Bulgarian collaborationist military officers operational, including the assassinations of the chief of the Bulgarian Police, Atanas Pantev and Lieutenant general Hristo Lukov. She was arrested by the police of the Bulgarian government, and was killed in a shootout with the police in June 1944.

== Biography ==
Violeta Yosifovna Yakova was born in Dupnitsa; her father, Yosef Yakov, a small trader, died before she was born. The difficult economic situation in Bulgaria after World War I led many Jewish families to migrate from relatively small towns to larger population centers, and under these circumstances, her family moved to the capital Sofia. Violeta learned sewing and was employed as a tailor's apprentice. For many young Bulgarian Jews in the late 1930s and during World War II, the rise of fascism and antisemitism, combined with the Bulgarian regime alignment with the Axis powers, furthered a commitment to left and antifascist organizations. In 1939, she joined the youth organization of the Bulgarian Communist Party. In 1942, after Bulgaria joined the Axis and signed the Tripartite Pact, Yakova joined the underground resistance.

== Assassination of Hristo Lukov ==
Many young Bulgarian Jews participated in direct actions against the government in Sofia. Together, Yakova and Anjel Vagenstein burned the Sofia Leather Jackets Factory in 1942, which produced uniforms for the German forces. Also, together with Leon Kalaora and Dano Albahara, formed a fighting cell which assassinated well-known antisemites and Nazi informers. Out of these, Yakova was considered the most skilled fighter, who assassinated Lieutenant General Hristo Lukov and the chief of the Bulgarian Police, Colonel Atanas Pantev. These crimes drew the attention of the Bulgarian government and at the beginning of March 1944, the Bulgarian police gathered intelligence information about the whereabouts of Yakova in her hometown of Radomir, and the police began a manhunt. Yakova was located in June and was killed in a shootout with the police.

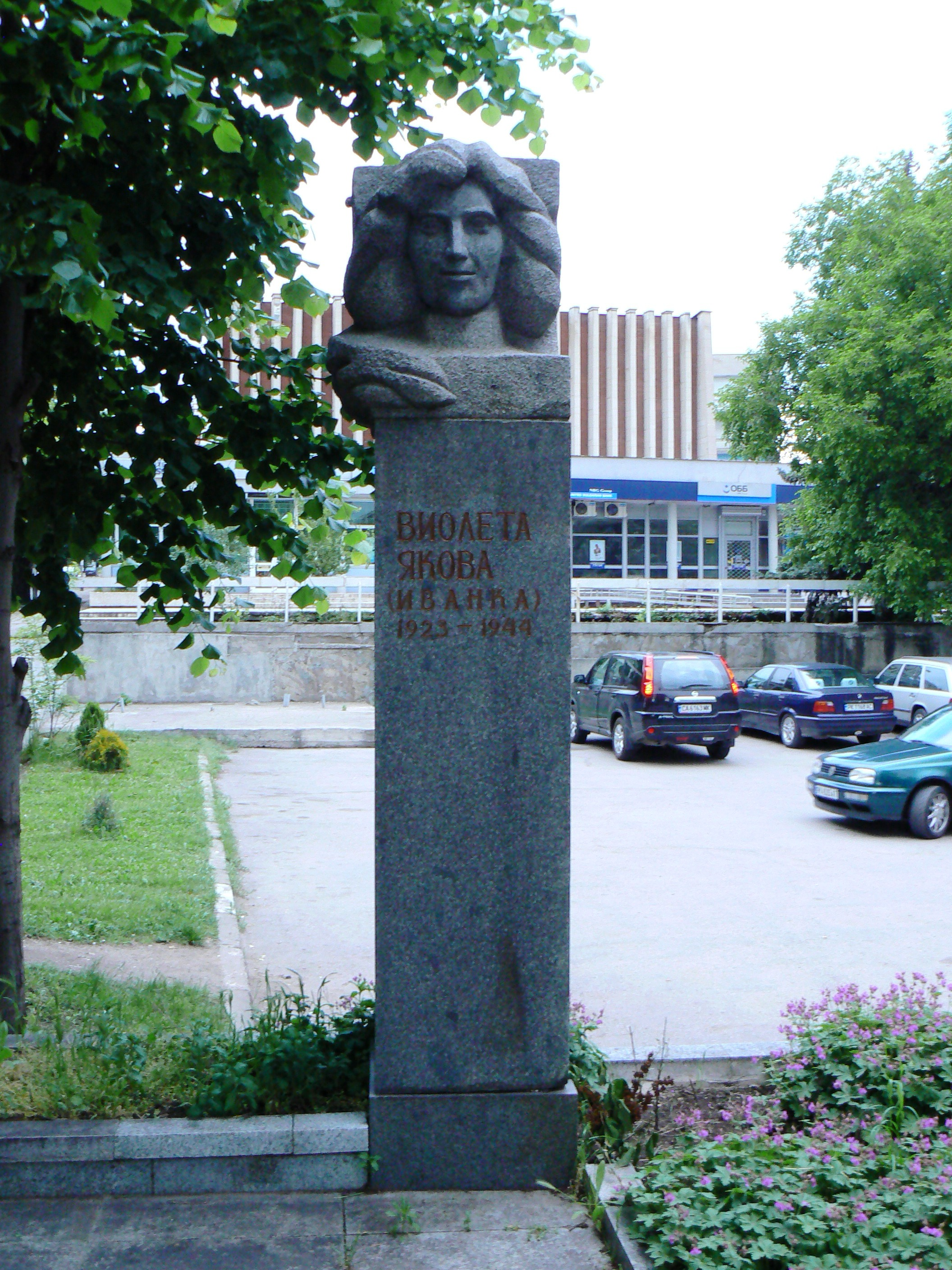
Monument erected in the city of Radomir.

== Memorial ==
Yakova's dedication to communism and the circumstances of her death made her one of the symbols of the resistance against the fascist regime in Bulgaria, and one of the heroines of the Communist movement in socialist Bulgaria. In 1970, Vulo Radev produced a movie called Черните ангели (Black Angels), whose plot is about the assassination of Bulgarian military officers by young communist partisan fighters, in which Yakova and other communist women take a central role. The Communist Party of Bulgaria erected a monument in her memory in 1971. After the fall of communism in 1989, Yakova's place in Bulgarian public memory became more contested, with her former status as a communist partisan contributing to her marginalisation in the country's changing commemorative landscape, later scholarship has also noted renewed public attention to her in connection with the annual Lukov March, which commemorates Hristo Lukov, the general she helped assassinate.
