= Bulgarian National Front =

Anti-communist Bulgarian organisation in exile (1948-1995)

The Bulgarian National Front (Bulgarian:Български Национален Фронт (Bulgarski natsionalen front) or BNF) is an anti-communist political movement active amongst emigrant Bulgarian populations. The group, which is active in a number of countries but not in Bulgaria itself, has been characterised as far-right and a continuation of earlier fascist movements.

== Organisation ==
The BNF was formed in Munich, Germany in 1947 by Bulgarians living in exile in the city under the leadership of Ivan Dochev. The group's stated aim was to oppose communism in Bulgaria and influence western opinion against the communist regime, whilst also seeking to build up activism amongst émigrés. The group's membership was mostly made up of former members of the Union of Bulgarian National Legions, many of whom had collaborated with Nazi Germany. Before long the BNF had established branches in the United States, Western Europe and South America as well as Dochev's base of Canada. Their main journal was Svoboda, a multilingual publication which first appeared in Germany in 1959 before moving to Canada in 1970.

Bulgarian historian Spas T. Raikin was a member and served as editor for their journal 'Borba' (struggle).

== North American activities ==
The group was associated with the Republican Heritage Groups Council, a formalised development of the "Ethnic Division" of the Republican Party that was established in 1969. The Bulgarian National Committee, a conservative émigré group, warned against allowing the BNF to be involved in this group, denouncing them as fascist although Richard Nixon's administration did not move against them and the BNF's Radi Slavoff served as executive director of the Council. In 1984 Dochev stepped aside as leader in favour of George Paprikoff and under Paprikoff the BNF became more involved in Republican Party politics, campaigning for Ronald Reagan and writing in support of him in their journal Borba.

The BNF was also a member of the Coalition for Peace Through Strength (CPTS), an ad hoc lobby group of the American Security Council opposed to nuclear disarmament as well as the World Anti-Communist League.

In Canada the BNF gained attention for the protests it held in Toronto in 1971 against a visit by Alexei Kosygin, a rally held in Ottawa in 1976 and annual masses held on 9 September, the date of the establishment of the People's Republic of Bulgaria, to commemorate Bulgarian war dead.

== Post-communism ==
Following the collapse of communism in Bulgaria the BNF became active in their homeland again, largely in support of the Union of Democratic Forces. As an overseas based organisation the BNF is still active from its base in Chicago.

== Splinter group ==
A separate group using the same name and led by former BNF activist Nikola Altunkov established itself as a far right Bulgarian political party in 1994. Closely linked to Bulgaria's version of the Internal Macedonian Revolutionary Organization this new BNF, which frequently publishes works in praise of the Union of Bulgarian National Legions and other extremist groups of that era, has found little political support with its vote share in the 2001 election being barely negligible.
