= Abidin Daver =

Turkish politician

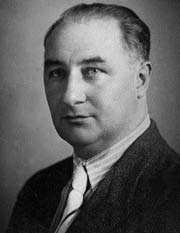

Member of the Grand National Assembly

Personal details
- Born: 1886 Constantinople, Ottoman Empire
- Died: 8 February 1954 (aged 67–68) Istanbul, Turkey
- Education: Galatasaray High School
- Alma mater: Sanâyi-i Nefîse Mektebi

Abidin Daver (1886, Constantinople – 8 February 1954, Istanbul) was a Turkish nationalist writer and politician.

== Biography ==
He is the son of Ali Vahyi Bey and Fatma Revan. He joined Galatasaray Sports Club in 1908 and became a member.

Daver started his education at Soğukçeşme Military Middle School and completed Mekteb-i Sultani in 1917. Daver continued his studies at the Sanayi-i Nefise Mektebi and began to write articles for various newspapers. After 1908, he became a journalist and became a columnist in Tasvîr-i Efkâr, then Yeni Gün, Tercüman-ı Hakikat, İkdam and a columnist in the newspaper Cumhuriyet.

Daver, who was among the founding line-up of Galatasaray SK, was the president of the club between 1929-1930. After the attack on the Turkish cemetery in Razgrad, he dedicated a column related to the event. Between 1939 and 1943 Daver, who served in the Turkish Grand National Assembly as an MP for the term, is also known as a civilian admiral for his contributions to Turkish maritime affairs. After his death on 8 February 1954, his name was given to a constitution of Denizcilik Bankası.
