= Dragi Gjorgiev =

- Драги Ѓоргиев
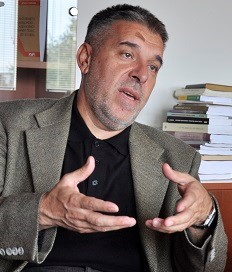
- Born: 28 April 1963 (age 62); Strumica, PR Macedonia, SFR Yugoslavia (present-day North Macedonia)
- Occupation: Historian

Dragi Gjorgiev (Macedonian: Драги Ѓоргиев; 28 April 1963) is a Macedonian academician and historian, specializing in the Ottoman period. He was the director of the Institute of National History of North Macedonia from 2012 to 2023.

== Biography ==
Gjorgiev was born in the town of Strumica. In 1986 he graduated from the History Department of the Faculty of Philosophy at the Ss. Cyril and Methodius University of Skopje and in 1988 he was employed by the Institute of National History as a younger assistant. He later studied Oriental languages at the University of Sarajevo, graduating in 1991.

He obtained his master's degree in 1995 at the Department of History of the Faculty of Philosophy in Skopje, on the thesis "Skopje from the Turkish conquest to the end of the 17th century". Later that year, he became an assistant in the Department of Ottoman-Turkish Period at the Institute of National History. In 2004 he obtained his doctorate at the Ss. Cyril and Methodius University of Skopje, with his dissertation "Population in the Macedonian-Albanian border zone in the 15th and 16th centuries". He returned to the Department of the Ottoman-Turkish Period at the Institute of National History as a research associate, and in 2007 was named a senior research associate, and in 2010 as a scientific advisor. Since 2012 he is the director of the institute. He became an academician of the Macedonian Academy of Sciences and Arts in 2022.

Gjorgiev is a member of multiple editorial boards, councils and institutions. He was also the co-chairman of the Joint Multidisciplinary Expert Commission of Experts on Historical and Educational Issues between North Macedonia and Bulgaria from 2018 to 2024.
