= Rodna Zashtita =

Bulgarian fascist organization in 1920s-1930s

Rodna Zashtita (Bulgarian: Родна Защита), meaning Native Defense, was a nationalist, antisemitic, fascist organization that operated in Bulgaria from before 1923 to 1936. At its peak in the late 1920s, it had tens of thousands of members.

Rodna Zashtita had an anti-agrarian, anti-communist, and antisemitic ideology. In addition, the organization opposed the Freemasons. The organization advocated corporatism and demanded the abolition of political parties. The organisation's members wore black shirts, saluted with a fascist salute and spread propaganda of love for Bulgaria and preaching sacrifice for the homeland. The organization has been classified as "proto-fascist" by the researcher of fascism in Bulgaria, Nikolai Poppetrov. Rodna Zashtita sporadically committed attacks upon Bulgarian Turks. In 1933, the group attacked the Turkish cemetery in Razgrad. After 1936, its members merged with the Ratnik organization.

== See also ==
- Fascism in Bulgaria
