= Ratniks =

Far-right Bulgarian nationalist organization

Union of Warriors for the Advancement of Bulgarianness Съюз на ратниците за напредъка на българщината
- Leader: Asen Kantardzhiev
- Founded: 19 July 1936; 90 years ago
- Banned: 1944; 82 years ago
- Preceded by: Rodna Zashtita
- Headquarters: Sofia, Bulgaria
- Newspaper: Progled
- Ideology: Fascism (Bulgarian)
- Political position: Far-right
- Religion: Bulgarian Orthodox Christianity
- Colours: Red Black

Party flag

The Union of Warriors for the Advancement of Bulgarianness (Bulgarian: Съюз на ратниците за напредъка на българщината, Sayuz na ratnitsite za napredaka na balgarshtinata), commonly known as just the Ratniks (Ратници, Ratnitsi) was a far-right Bulgarian nationalist organization founded in 1936. Its ideas were close to those of Germany's Nazis, including antisemitism and paramilitarism, but also loyalty to the Bulgarian Orthodox Church. The Ratniks wore red uniforms in outright competition with the communists for the hearts and minds of the Bulgarian youth, and also badges bearing the Bogar: a Bulgarian sun cross, which became the organisation's symbol.

== Banned by Boris III, organizing a Bulgarian Kristallnacht ==
Despite decreeing their loyalty to the Bulgarian monarchy and King Boris III of Bulgaria, he officially dissolved the organisation in April 1939. The ban, however, was not enforced, and the Ratniks remained in existence. It was soon after the ban that they carried out one of their more notorious acts, the so-called "Bulgarian Kristallnacht" when, on September 20, 1939, the Ratniks marched in Sofia throwing stones at the Jewish shops. Police did not intervene, and some shop windows were smashed, although ultimately, it proved to have much less impact than the German version and was widely condemned by most politicians. Aleksandar Belev, a leading member of the group, later claimed that the attack had been his idea and that he had personally led the mob.

== Dissolution, with former members joining the government-in-exile and the Wehrmacht ==
With the coming of the Red Army and the Bolsheviks into Bulgaria on September 9, 1944, which led to a coup d'état on the same day, the Ratniks disappeared from the Bulgarian scene. Many of the leaders became members of the Bulgarian national government abroad, and some of the young Ratniks became volunteers in the Wehrmacht. In contrast, others stayed in Bulgaria to fight against the Communists.

== See also ==
- Fascism in Bulgaria
