= Union of Bulgarian National Legions =

Union of Bulgarian National Legions Съюз на българските национални легиони
- Leader: Hristo Lukov
- Founded: 26 August 1932; 93 years ago
- Banned: 9 September 1944; 81 years ago
- Newspaper: Prelom
- Membership: approx. 75,000 (1939 est.)
- Ideology: Monarchism; Bulgarian ultranationalism
- Political position: Far-right
- Religion: Bulgarian Orthodox Church
- Colours: Red Green Black; White

Party flag

The Union of Bulgarian National Legions (UBNL) (Bulgarian: Съюз на Българските Национални Легиони (СБНЛ); Sayuz na Balgarskite Natsionalni Legioni (SBNL)), until 1935 the Union of the National Youth Legions (UNYL); Съюз на Младежките Национални Легиони (СМНЛ); Sayuz na Mladezhkite Natsionalni Legioni (SMNL), was an ultranationalist, monarchist, and right extremist organization in Bulgaria, which was active between 1932 and 1944.

The organization had an ideology close to fascism, including creating a totalitarian one-party regime, a ban on the market economy and total control by the state over the economy and the society, anti-Semitism and hostility towards foreigners, anti-communism, etc. It demonstrated similarity to the Italian fascism and German Nazism, from which it "borrows" ideas, symbols, and slogans.

Emblem of the Union of National Youth Legions (SMNL)

It was initially founded as Union of the National Youth Legions, which gained popularity among youth by using propaganda methods, popular in Nazi Germany at that time, including a march from Sofia to Veliko Tarnovo. It rivalled for political support with other popular nationalist organizations such as the Ratniks and the National Social movement. By 1939 the already-renamed UBNL had 75,000 members. While in that year, it was formally banned by the pro-German government of Tsar Boris III, it continued to function. It supported the close alliance of Bulgaria to Nazi Germany.

In 1942 Hristo Lukov, a retired Bulgarian army lieutenant general and former minister of war became head of the organization. Identifying itself as an extreme monarchist group, it sought unsuccessfully to work with the National Social Movement before finally emerging as an opposition group that was largely supportive of Nazism, but critical of Bogdan Filov's pro-Nazi government, which they defined as consisting of "capitalists, Judeo-Masons and Bolsheviks". SBNL was banned after the 1944 coup d'état along with all other nationalist organizations and parties.

Bulgarian historians define the organization as containing the features of the far right. Besides Nikolay Poppetrov, quoted above, Rumen Daskalov describes it as "having a complete fascist character during the years of WWII", which includes "far nationalistic and chauvinistic, authoritarian and totalitarian ideas, but even more tenacious and irreconcilable to any party-parliamentary forms and liberal-individualistic ideas, but also –more characteristically– leadership and elitism, racism, anti-Semitism, etc."

A yearly march with torches, reminiscent of the Nazi marches from the 1930s, in commemoration of UBNL leader Hristo Lukov, is being organized by a far-right informal organization in Bulgaria, calling themselves Bulgarian National Union (Български национален съюз). The organization describes itself as "ideologically closest to the Union of Bulgarian National Legions".

== See also ==
- Fascism in Bulgaria
