= Hristo Lukov =

Bulgarian lieutenant-general, politician and Minister of War

- Христо Луков
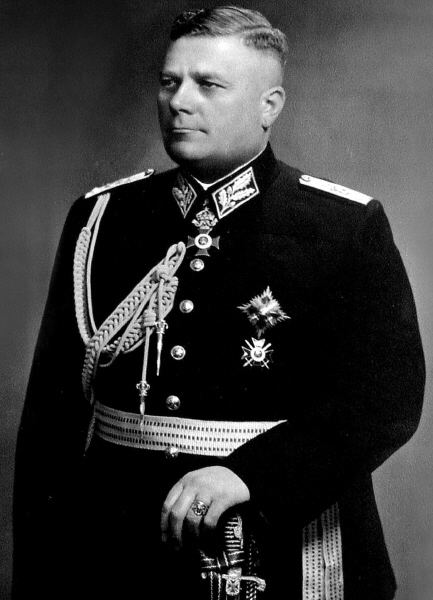
- Hristov Lukov in full military regalia

Minister of War
- In office 23 November 1935 – 24 January 1938
- Prime Minister: Georgi Kyoseivanov
- Preceded by: Stefan Tsanev
- Succeeded by: Teodosi Daskalov

Personal details
- Born: Hristo Nikolov Lukov; 6 January 1887 Varna, Kingdom of Bulgaria
- Died: 13 February 1943 (aged 56) Sofia, Kingdom of Bulgaria
- Cause of death: Assassination by gunshot
- Party: Union of Bulgarian National Legions
- Education: Vasil Levski National Military University

Military service
- Allegiance: Kingdom of Bulgaria
- Branch/service: Bulgarian Land Forces
- Years of service: 1907–1932
- Rank: Lieutenant general
- Battles/wars: First Balkan War; Second Balkan War; World War I
- Awards: Order of Bravery

Hristo Nikolov Lukov (Bulgarian: Христо Николов Луков; 6 January 1887 in Varna – 13 February 1943 in Sofia) was a Bulgarian lieutenant-general, politician, and Minister of War, who led the nationalistic Union of Bulgarian National Legions (UBNL), an organisation largely supportive of Nazi ideology. He was assassinated in 1943 by two members of the Bulgarian resistance movement, Violeta Yakova and Ivan Burudzhiev.

== Military and political career ==
=== First World War ===
Hristo Nikolov Lukov was promoted during World War I to the rank of a major and a commander of an artillery battalion. Abroad he is incorrectly thought to be the commander of the 13th Infantry division during World War I. In fact, that was major-general Hristo Tsonev Lukov, a native of Gabrovo.

=== Interwar period ===
During the interwar period Hristo Nikolov Lukov became the commander of the Army School of Artillery, of the Training Section of the General Staff's Artillery Inspection, and of the 2nd and 3rd Infantry divisions.

Between 1935–1938 Lukov served as Minister of War, in which position he created close ties to high-ranking Nazi officials.

=== Second World War ===
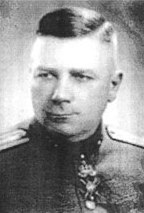
Hristov Lukov earlier in his military career ca. 1930

During the Second World War he was a key supporter of the Axis powers, particularly Nazi Germany. This was largely due to his close relations with the Third Reich and his activities as leader of UBNL. Lukov was considered one of the most prominent advocates of antisemitic ideas in Bulgaria.

== Death ==
Lukov was shot dead by Communist partisans on 13 February 1943 in Sofia. According to the book In the Name of the People, he was ambushed by two resistance fighters in front of his apartment in Sofia. Although struck by one bullet, he fought back one of the partisans, Ivan Burudzhiev, but the second one, Violeta Yakova, fired two more shots and killed him.

== 'Lukov March' ==
From 2003 to 2019, the far-right Bulgarian National Union hosted an annual 'Lukov March' to commemorate "fallen heroes of Bulgaria" with a torch march, taking place in February in Sofia. It persistently caused controversy and was subject to multiple court bans. In 2020, the Supreme Administrative Court upheld a ban by the Sofia municipality so that the evening procession was cancelled. Less than 200 supporters of Lukov still gathered for the laying of wreaths at the house where Lukov was killed. Over one hundred people gathered for a counter-protest in central Sofia earlier in the day, using the slogan of "No Nazis on the streets".

== Awards and decorations ==
- Order of Bravery, 4th degree, first and second class
- Order of St Alexander, 3rd class without swords and 4th class with swords
- Order of Military Merit, 1st class
- Iron Cross of 1939, 2nd class (Germany)

== See also ==
- List of Bulgarian generals in the Kingdom of Bulgaria

== Sources ==
- Biographical Dictionary of the Extreme Right Since 1890 edited by Philip Rees, 1991, ISBN 0-13-089301-3

Political offices
Preceded by Stefan Tsanev	Minister of War of Bulgaria; 23 November 1935 – 24 January 1938	Succeeded by Teodosi Daskalov
