= Dimitar Chkatrov =

Bulgarian activist

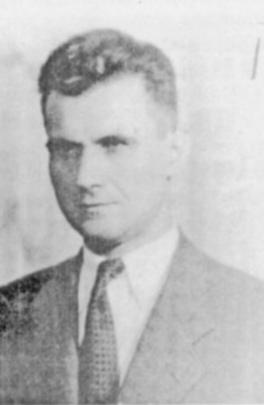
Dimitar Chkatrov photo

Dimitar Chkatrov was Bulgarian activist in Vardar Macedonia. He was born in Prilep, then in the Ottoman Empire in 1900. Chkatrov began to study at the Bulgarian primary school in his hometown, but after the establishment of Serbian rule following the First World War, he completed his education in a Serbian school. In the first half of the 1920s, Chkatrov studied civil engineering at the University of Belgrade. He took an active part in the resistance against the policy of Serbianization in Yugoslav Macedonia. In 1927, a trial was organized in Skopje against a group of Bulgarian students. They were arrested after a failure in the Macedonian Youth Secret Revolutionary Organization. Dimitar Chkatrov was sentenced to 10 years in prison. In an unsuccessful attempt to escape, he was shot in the chest, and was returned to prison to serve his sentence. Chkatrov participated in the establishment of the Bulgarian Action Committees in Prilep in 1941. After the accession of most of Vardar Macedonia to Bulgaria in the same year he was closely involved in the establishment of civic Bulgarian national clubs. In 1945 Dimitar Chkatrov was arrested by the new Yugoslav communist authorities and accused of being pro-Bulgarian fascist collaborator. He was sentenced to death by firing squad. Chkatrov was shot in 1945 near Skopje, together with his friend Dimitar Gyuzelov.

== See also ==
- World War II in Yugoslav Macedonia
- 1944 Bulgarian coup d'état
