= Dimitar Gyuzelov =

Bulgarian revolutionary and philosopher

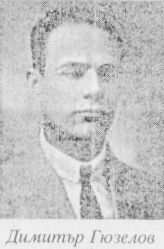
- Portrait of Dimitar Gyuzelov
- Born: 10 January 1903; Dojran, Ottoman Empire
- Died: 1945; Skopje, SFR Yugoslavia
- Cause of death: Execution by firing squad

Dimitar Gyuzelov (Bulgarian: Димитър Гюзелов, Macedonian: Димитар Ѓузелев) was a Macedonian Bulgarian revolutionary and philosopher. He is the father of Macedonian writer Bogomil Gyuzel and artist Liljana Gyuzelova, who between 1996 and 2006 worked on an art installation titled The Perpetual Return, dedicated to her father, his murder, and the stigma that the children of prominent Bulgarians who had been persecuted by the Yugoslav authorities after 1945 had to endure.

== Biography ==
Gyuzelov was born in 1902 in Doyran, then in the Ottoman Empire, but after the destruction of the city during World War I his family moved to Strumica. He finished Serbian high school in that city and then studied philosophy and Slavic studies in the Faculty of Philosophy in Skopje, during which time he was sponsored by Internal Macedonian Revolutionary Organization (IMRO). In 1924 he joined the Macedonian Youth Secret Revolutionary Organization (MYSRO) shortly after its establishment and initial development, and like this organized wide activities by forming a nucleus of organization in many places in than Vardar Banovina.

After the occupation of most of the Yugoslav Vardar Banovina by Bulgaria in 1941, Gyuzelov became director of Radio Skopje. After the end of war, the Communist government of Yugoslavia sentenced him to death, labeling him like many other prominent Bulgarians as a "Bulgarian fascist". He was shot, together with Dimitar Chkatrov, in the vicinity of Zaychev Rid, three kilometers outside of Skopje.
