= Bulgarian irredentism =

Bulgarian nationalist territorial claims

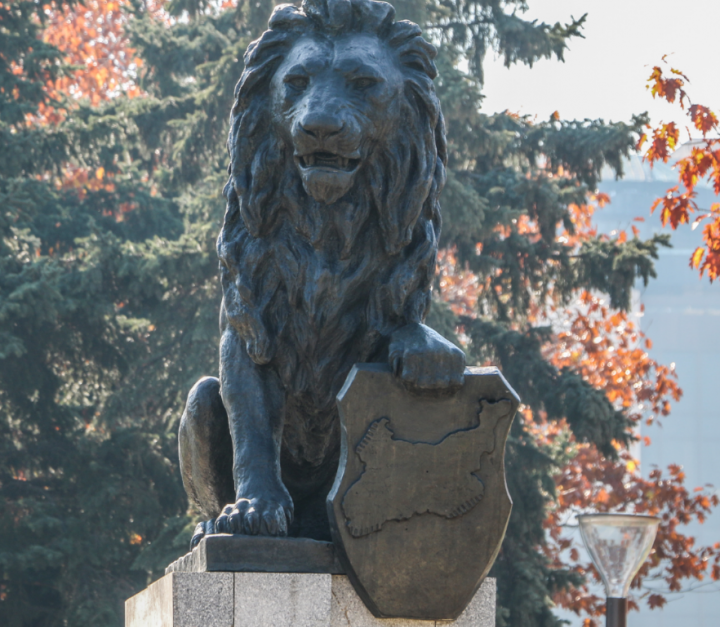
A Bulgarian lion monument holding a shield with a map of Greater Bulgaria depicted on it

Bulgarian irredentism is a term to identify the territory associated with a historical national state and a modern Bulgarian irredentist nationalist movement in the 19th and 20th centuries, which would include most of Macedonia, Thrace and Moesia.

== History ==
The larger proposed Bulgarian state was suggested under the Treaty of San Stefano in 1878.

The issue of irredentism and nationalism gained greater prominence after the Treaty of San Stefano. It established a Principality of Bulgaria, with territory including most of Moesia – the plain between the Danube and the Balkan Mountains (Stara Planina), the regions of Sofia, Pirot, and Vranje in the Morava Valley, Thrace – Northern Thrace, parts of Eastern Thrace, and nearly all of Macedonia. This treaty laid grounds for much of the later claims for a Greater Bulgaria. However, the Treaty of San Stefano was a preliminary one, and the borders of the newly created Bulgaria were established in the Treaty of Berlin. It saw the previous territory divided into three – the Principality of Bulgaria, the autonomous province of Eastern Rumelia, and Macedonia, which remained under Ottoman control.

In the early 20th century, control over Macedonia was a key point of contention between Ottoman Empire, Bulgaria, Greece, and Serbia who fought both the First Balkan War of 1912–1913 and the Second Balkan War of 1913. The area was further fought over during the Macedonian Campaign of World War I (1915–1918).

Just before entering World War II, Bulgaria had peacefully secured the return of Southern Dobruja from Romania in the Treaty of Craiova. Some of the territories in question were, during World War II, briefly added to Bulgaria by Nazi Germany, as a reward to Bulgaria, which had fought with Germany as one of the Axis powers. It was granted territory in Greece, namely Eastern Macedonia and parts of Western Thrace, as well as Yugoslav Macedonia (Vardar Macedonia). With the exception of Southern Dobruja, these concessions were reversed with the Allied victory (i.e. at the 1947 Paris Peace Conference).

== Gallery ==
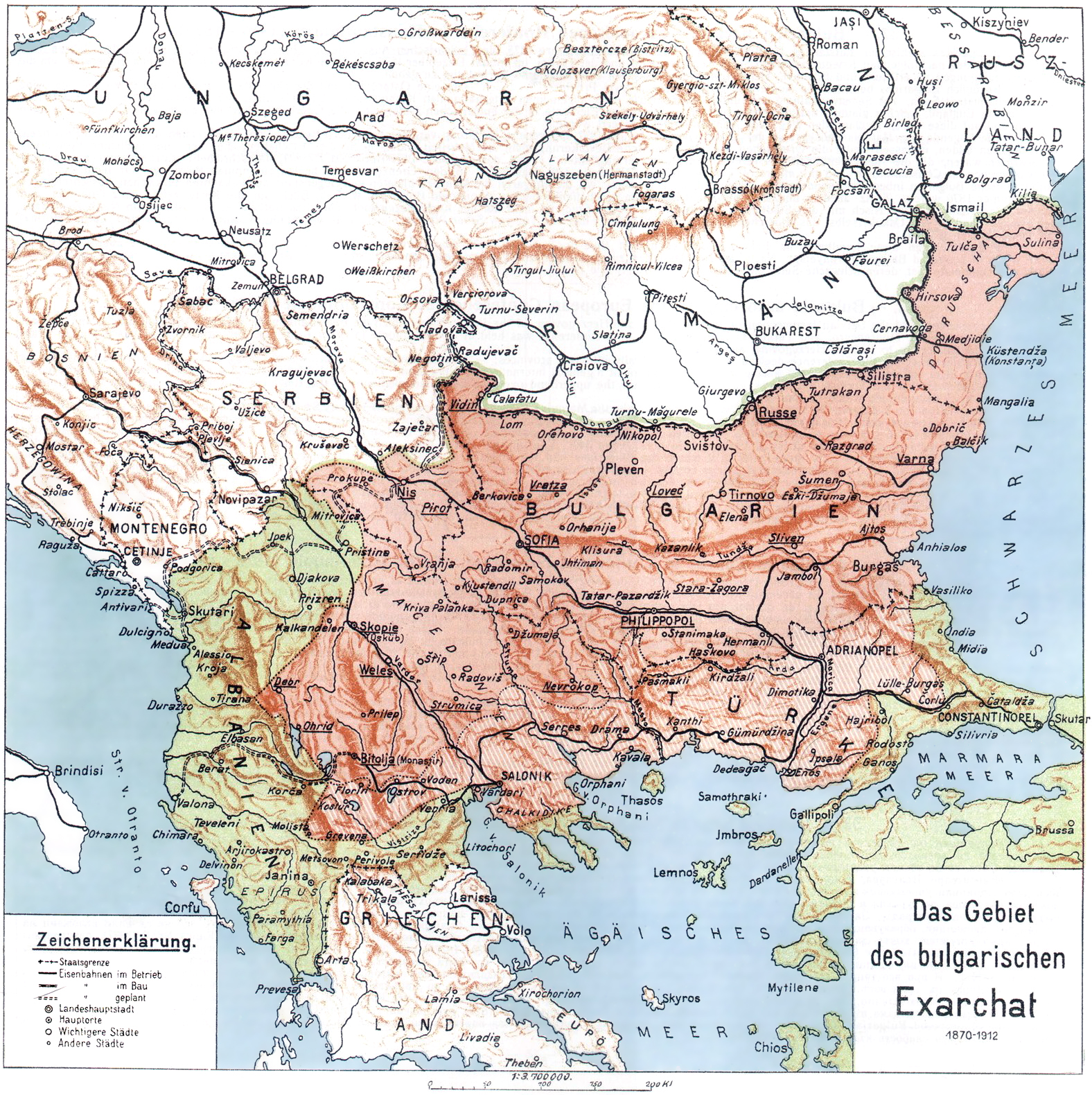
Bulgarian Exarchate (1870–1913).

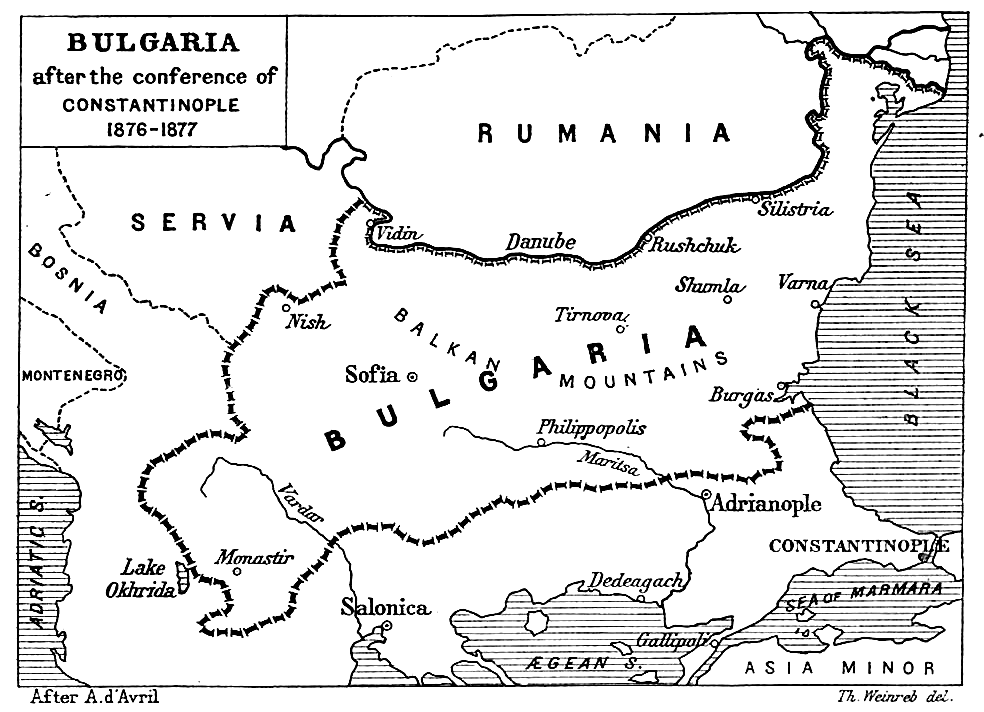
Bulgaria according to the Constantinople Conference of 1876.

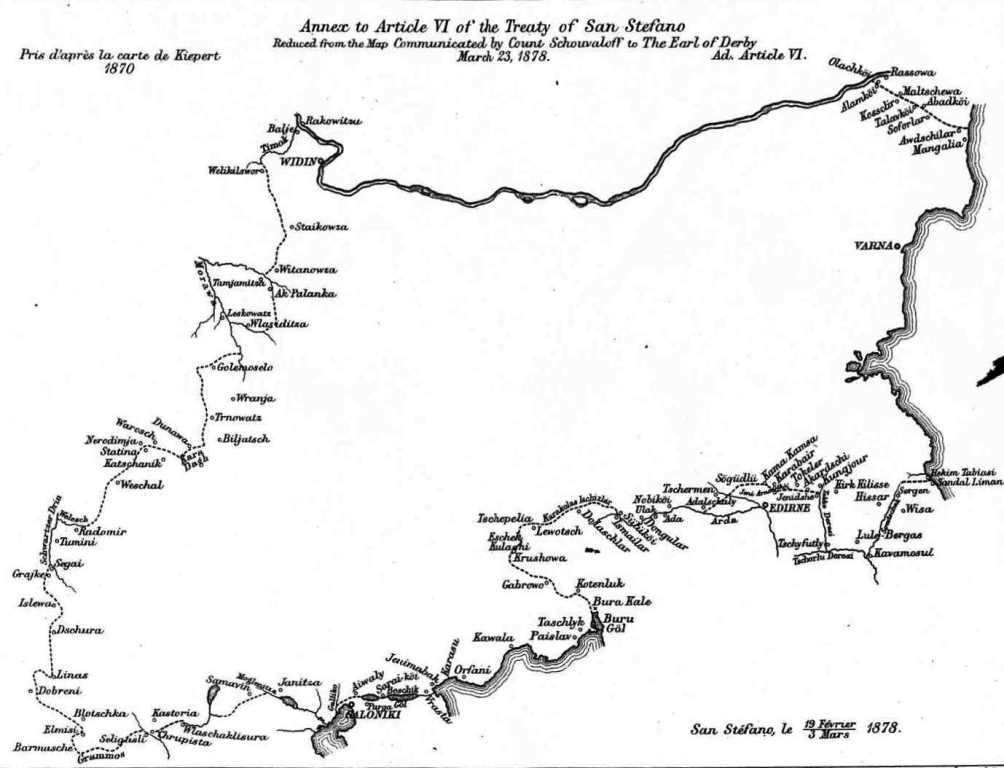
Treaty of San Stefano (1878) showing the boundaries of Bulgaria.

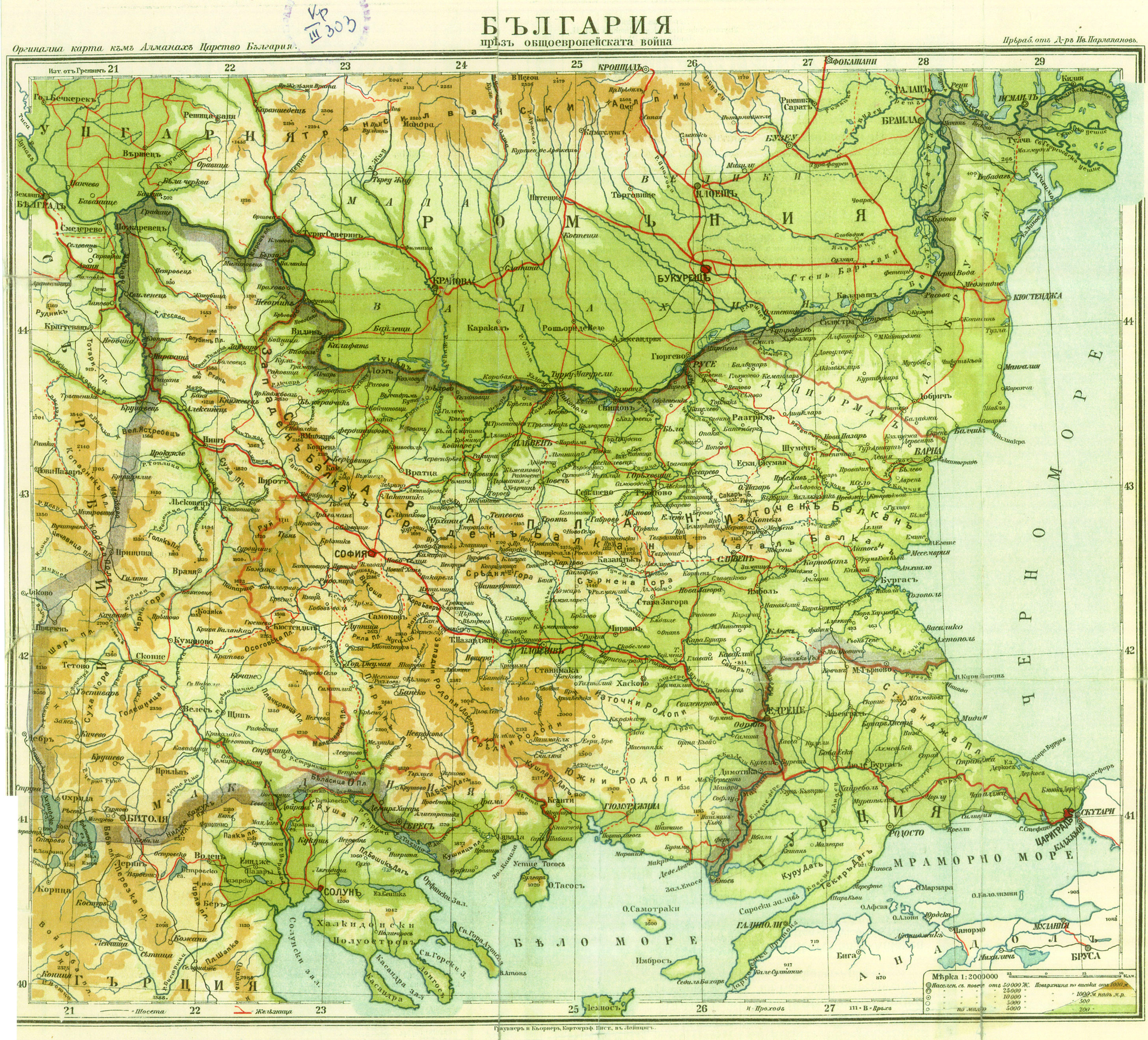
Bulgarian campaigns during World War I (1915-1918).

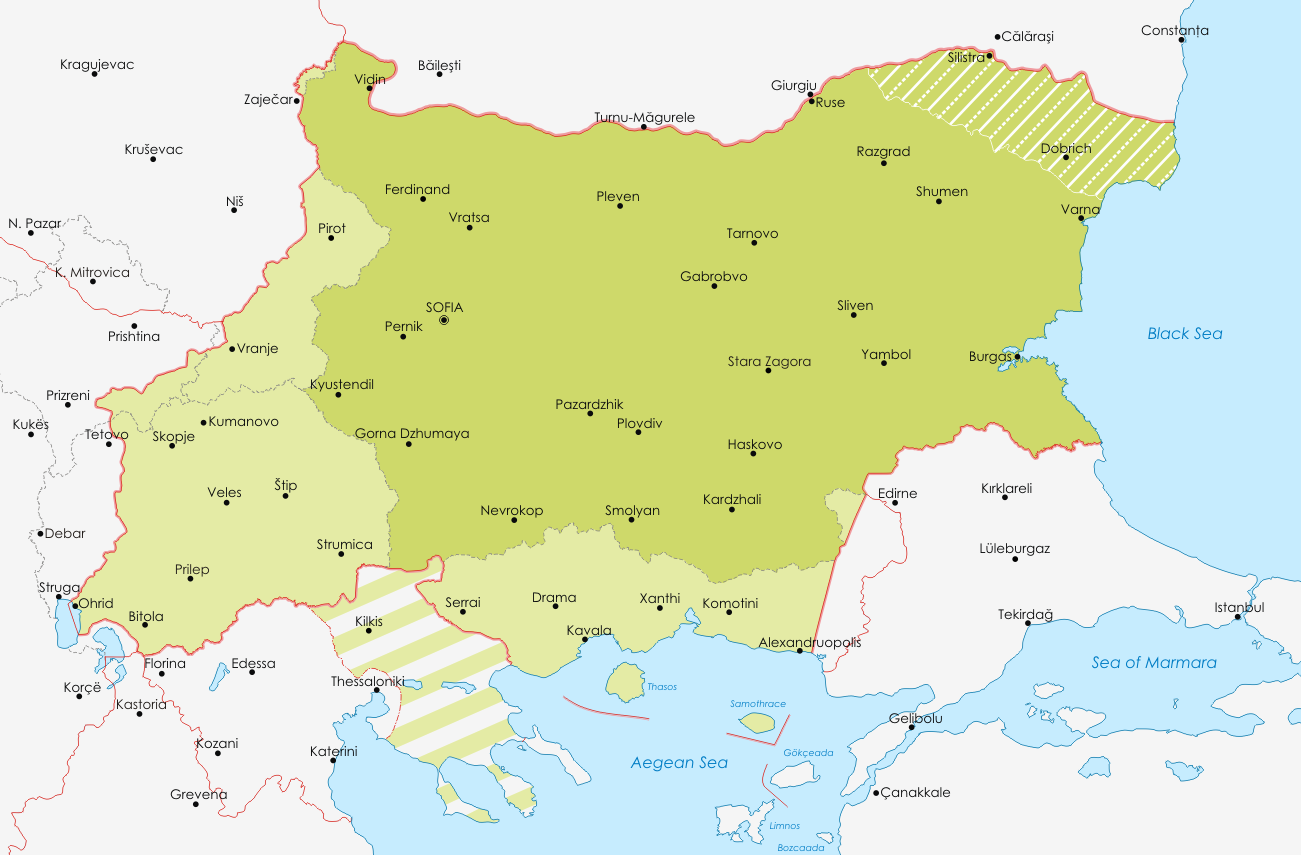
Bulgaria during World War II (1941-1944).

== See also ==
- Bulgarian National Awakening
- Bulgarian Millet
- Bulgarian unification
- Bulgarian Declaration of Independence
