= The Holocaust in Bulgaria =

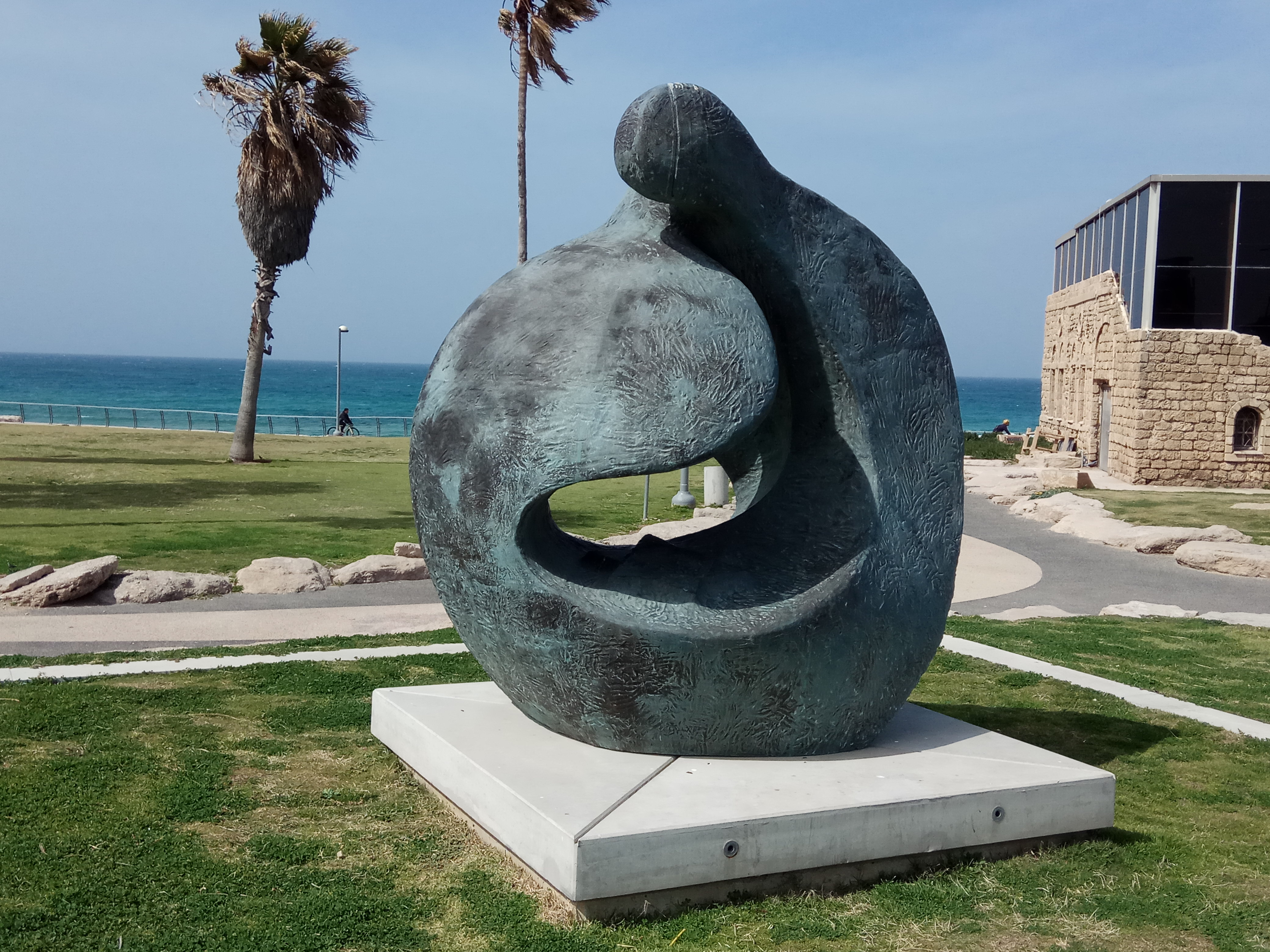
Rescue memorial at Charles Clore Park in Tel Aviv in memory of the salvation of the Jews in Bulgaria

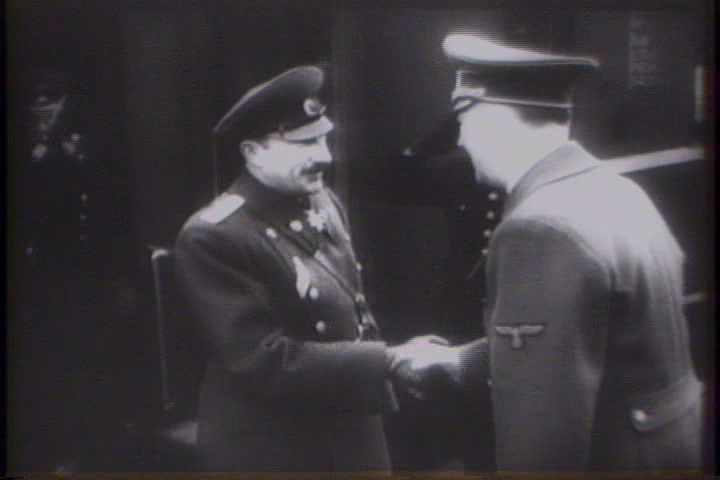
Boris III with Axis ally Adolf Hitler in 1941

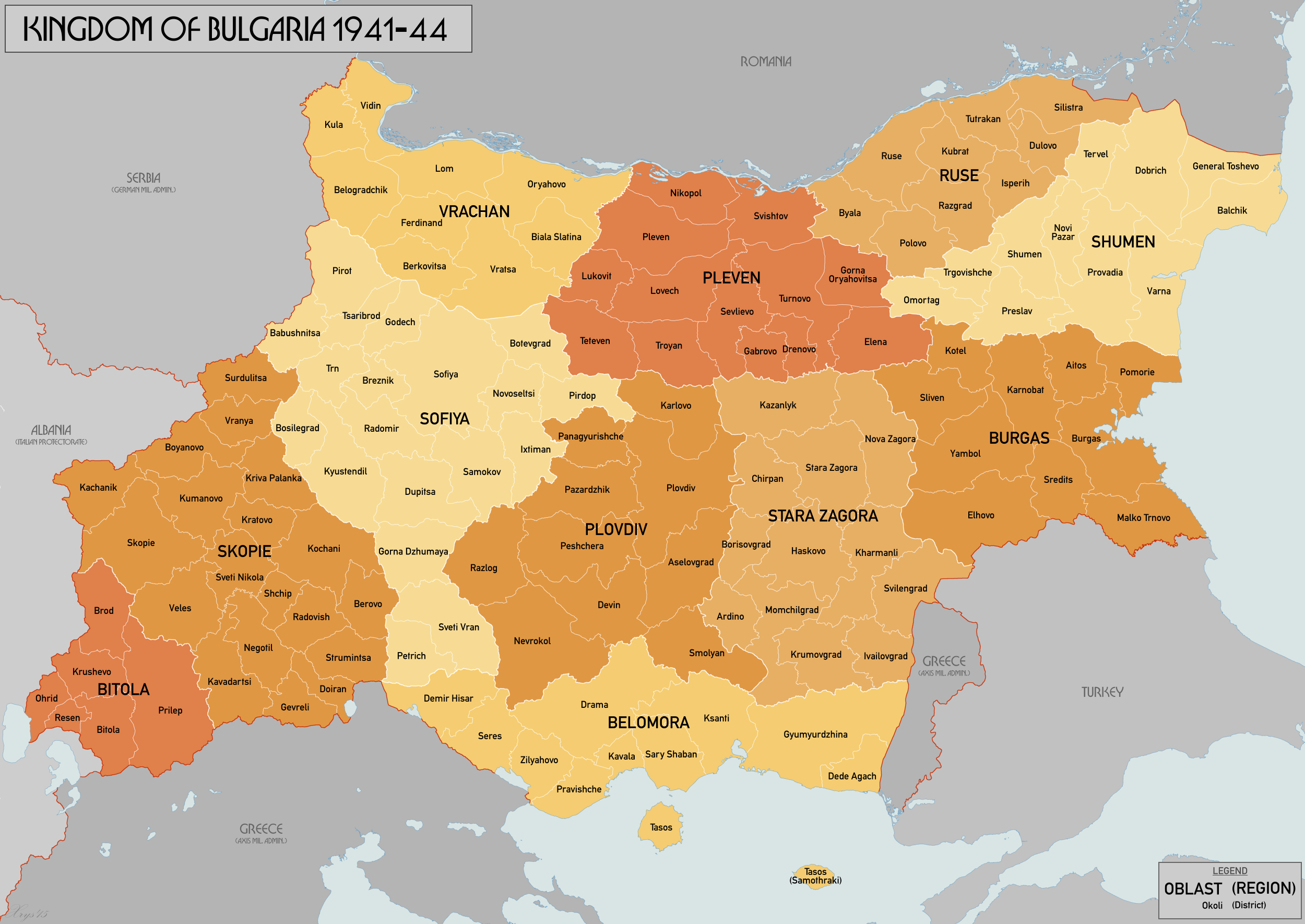
Kingdom of Bulgaria, as it existed between 1941 and 1944

The Holocaust saw the persecution of Jews in the Tsardom of Bulgaria and their deportation and annihilation in the Bulgarian-occupied regions of Yugoslavia and Greece between 1941 and 1944, arranged by the Nazi Germany-allied government of Tsar Boris III and Prime Minister Bogdan Filov. The persecution began in 1941 with the passing of anti-Jewish legislation and culminated in March 1943 with the detention and deportation of almost all – 11,343 – of the Jews living in Bulgarian-occupied regions of Northern Greece, Yugoslav Macedonia and Pirot. These were deported by the Bulgarian authorities to Vienna and ultimately sent to extermination camps in Nazi-occupied Poland.

The deportation of the 48,000 Jews from Bulgaria proper also began at the same time but was found out and halted following the intervention of a group of government members of parliament led by Dimitar Peshev. Subsequent public protests and pressure from prominent figures persuaded the Tsar to reject further plans for the deportation. Instead Sofia's 25,743 Jews were internally deported to the countryside and had their property confiscated. Jewish males between the ages of 20 and 46 were conscripted into the Labour Corps until September 1944. The events that prevented the deportation to extermination camps of about 48,000 Jews in spring 1943 are termed the "Rescue of the Bulgarian Jews". The survival rate of the Jewish population in Bulgaria as a result was one of the highest in Axis Europe.

== Background ==
In the period between the two world wars the Jewish community accounted for around 0.8% of the Bulgarian population, reaching approximately 48,000 people. More than half of them lived in the capital Sofia. Almost 90% of them were born in Bulgaria, 92% were Bulgarian citizens and their total share in the Bulgarian business and trade was 5.17%. The Bulgarian Jewish Community enjoyed excellent relations with the state as demonstrated in 1909 when the grand opening of the impressive new Sofia Synagogue (the third largest in Europe) was attended by the Bulgarian royal family.

The 1930s saw the Bulgarian government under the personal rule of Tsar Boris III become increasingly dependent on Nazi Germany as it sought to break the country's international economic isolation and to counteract the Balkan Pact signed by all of its neighbours. By 1939 almost 70% of Bulgaria's trade was with Germany. As a newly assertive Germany shook off the restrictions of the Treaty of Versailles and recovered its pre-war territories, its erstwhile ally Bulgaria similarly sought to repudiate the Treaty of Neuilly-sur-Seine and to recover territories lost in the war to Greece, Yugoslavia and Romania. The successful recovery of the vital Southern Dobrudja region from Romania in September 1940 following the personal intervention of Adolf Hitler further pushed Bulgaria in the German camp. With Germany poised to invade Greece and requiring transit through Bulgaria the country finally officially joined the Tripartite Pact in March 1941.

The influence of Nazi Germany became increasingly reflected in the political arena. A number of pro-fascist parties were founded in the 1930s, most notably the Legionaries; and the Ratniks who attempted their own version of Kristallnacht in Sofia. These organisations published anti-Jewish propaganda, distributed brochures and copied Nazi racial documents. While none of these organisations achieved any significant national following their close links with German Nazis gave them disproportionate influence. Several pro-Nazi politicians were appointed to senior positions by the Tsar in 1939 to foster a closer relationship with Nazi Germany. Key figures were the minister of the interior Petar Gabrovski and his protege Alexander Belev, both virulent antisemites who eventually architected the country's anti-semitic laws and oversaw their implementation.

For the whole period from 1934 until his death in August 1943 ultimate authority rested with the Tsar (whose personal rule has been characterised as a "mild dictatorship" by modern historians). Boris tried to keep Bulgaria out of the war at all costs, resisting pressure to send troops on the eastern front while otherwise generally aligning with Nazi Germany.

== 1940–1942 anti-Jewish legislation ==
The beginning of World War II and the dependence of Bulgaria on a Nazi Germany that by now dominated most of Europe intensified the pressure to pass anti-Jewish legislation. German support for the rejoining of Southern Dobrudja to Bulgaria in September 1940 proved the tipping point. Within a month, on 8 October 1940, interior minister, Petar Gabrovski, introduced the parliamentary bill for the Law for the Protection of the Nation (Bulgarian: Закон за защита на нацията, romanized: Zakon za zashtita na natsiyata). The law was modelled on the Nuremberg Laws, which Alexander Belev had been sent to Germany to study by Gabrovski. The Law for Protection of the Nation prohibited the granting of Bulgarian citizenship to Jews; it prohibited Jews from holding elected office or serving in the civil service; it prohibited them from serving in a military capacity and mandated that they complete their national service in the Labour Corps.

A number of economic and social marginalisation measures were introduced, such as limits on the numbers of Jews in each profession and in education, residency restrictions and others. The bill triggered a major outcry from the public and most of the intellectual elite. The small parliamentary opposition (Communists and Democrats alike) led by ex-PM Nikola Mushanov and former cabinet ministers Dimo Kazasov, Yanko Sakazov, and Stoyan Kosturkov condemned the law. The Holy Synod of the Bulgarian Orthodox Church published an open protest letter, as did 18 of Bulgaria's most prominent writers. A wave of protests and petitions were sent to the government by unions, professional organisations, prominent citizens, and concerned citizens. The Jewish Central Consistory of Bulgaria made detailed representations to the National Assembly chairman refuting the antisemitic accusations from the government. On the other hand, the bill was endorsed by nationalist and far right groups such as the Legionaries, the Ratniks, Brannik (a Bulgarian version of Nazi Germany's Hitlerjugend), as well as right-wing conservative organisations such as the Federation of Reserve Officers, the Federation of Reserve Sergeants and Soldiers, the Merchants' Association, the Students' Union, the Bulgarian Youth League, and the Pharmacists' Association. It was also supported by leading government delegate Dimitar Peshev, who later played a crucial role in saving Bulgarian Jews from deportation.

The Law for Protection of the nation was passed and received royal assent in January 1941. Throughout 1941, members of Brannik and the "Insurgents" (Chetnitsi) indulged in random acts of violence against Jews. Subsequent legislation continued the marginalisation. A one-time wealth tax of 1/5 to ¼ was imposed in July 1941 on the grounds of the Jews endangering the national economy. Jews who owned property were forced to offer it for sale to the State Land Fund, to Bulgarians or to Bulgarian companies at prices not exceeding 50% of the market value of the property as of 1932. The Commissariat for Jewish Affairs was founded in 1942 in the wake of the Wannsee Conference, with Alexander Belev as director, which issued further policing measures against Jews such as mandatory wearing of yellow stars. This can be interpreted as the immediate precursor of the decision to deport Jews to extermination camps.

== Deportations from the occupied territories ==
Receipt of the transportation costs that the Bulgarian state paid to transport 4137 Jews (3545 adults and 592 children aged 4-10) from Macedonia to Treblinka in 1943.

In April 1941, German forces invaded Greece and Yugoslavia from the territory of Bulgaria, defeating both countries in a matter of weeks. At a summit meeting between King Boris III, Hitler and Italy's Count Ciano on 17 April, Bulgaria was granted responsibility for administering Greek east Macedonia and Western Thrace, plus the Yugoslav provinces of Vardar Macedonia and Pirot, territories Bulgaria had fought over in World War 1 and hoped to annex permanently. Another possibly fatal factor was the newly passed Law for Protection of the Nation, which meant that Jews in the newly acquired regions would be denied Bulgarian citizenship. From April 1941 to September-October 1944 the regions would be under Bulgarian administration.

In January 1942, Nazi Germany outlined what it called the Final Solution to the Jewish Question at the Wannsee Conference and the new Commissariat for Jewish Affairs began to prepare to execute Bulgaria's part in the Final Solution. Belev signed a secret agreement with Germany's SS-Hauptsturmführer Theodor Dannecker on 22 February 1943 to initially deport 20,000 Jews, starting with those in the occupied Greek and Yugoslav regions.

External videos
- Silent film of the deportation of Jews from Kavala, Serres, and Drama in Bulgarian-occupied Thrace, March 1943

The deportation of 11,343 Jews (7,122 from Macedonia and 4,221 from Thrace) was organised and executed by the Bulgarian authorities, with the Treblinka extermination camp in Nazi-occupied Poland as their final destination. The Jews of Greek Eastern Macedonia and Thrace, Yugoslav Macedonia and Pirot began to be rounded up 4 March 1943. They were transported by train via transit camps in Bulgaria to Lom on the Danube, then by boat to Vienna, and again by train to Treblinka. The railway that carried the trains transporting Jewish deportees from Greece was constructed by Bulgarian Jewish forced labourers in the winter of late 1942 and early 1943. By 15 March, all but about a dozen of the Jews had been murdered at Treblinka. Additionally, at least one Bulgarian national was sent to Auschwitz.

== Attempted deportations from Bulgaria proper and rescue ==
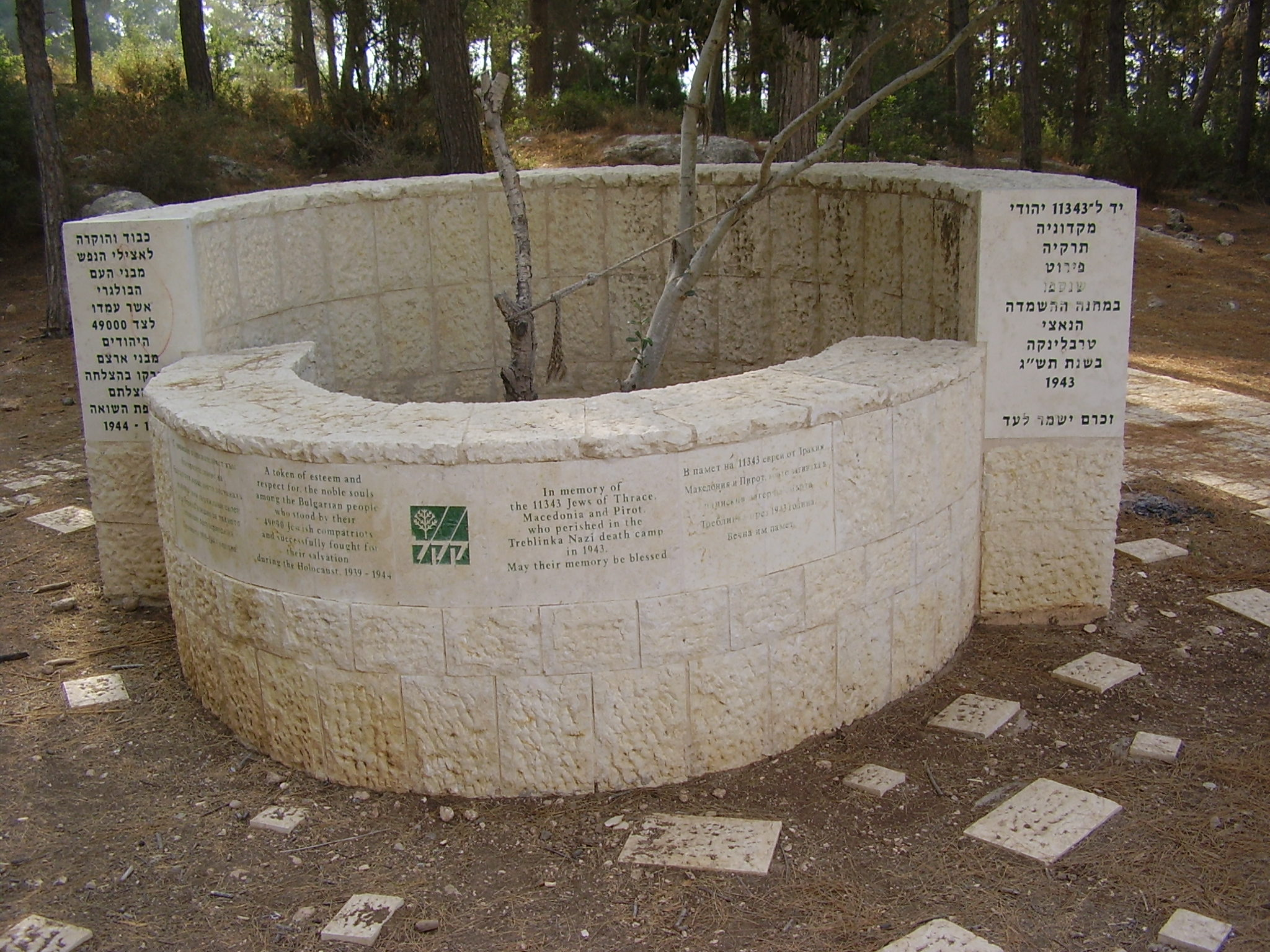
Monument in honor of the Bulgarian people who fought for the salvation of the Bulgarian Jews and in memory of the Jews of Thrace, Macedonia, and Pirot, who were murdered in the Treblinka Nazi death camp

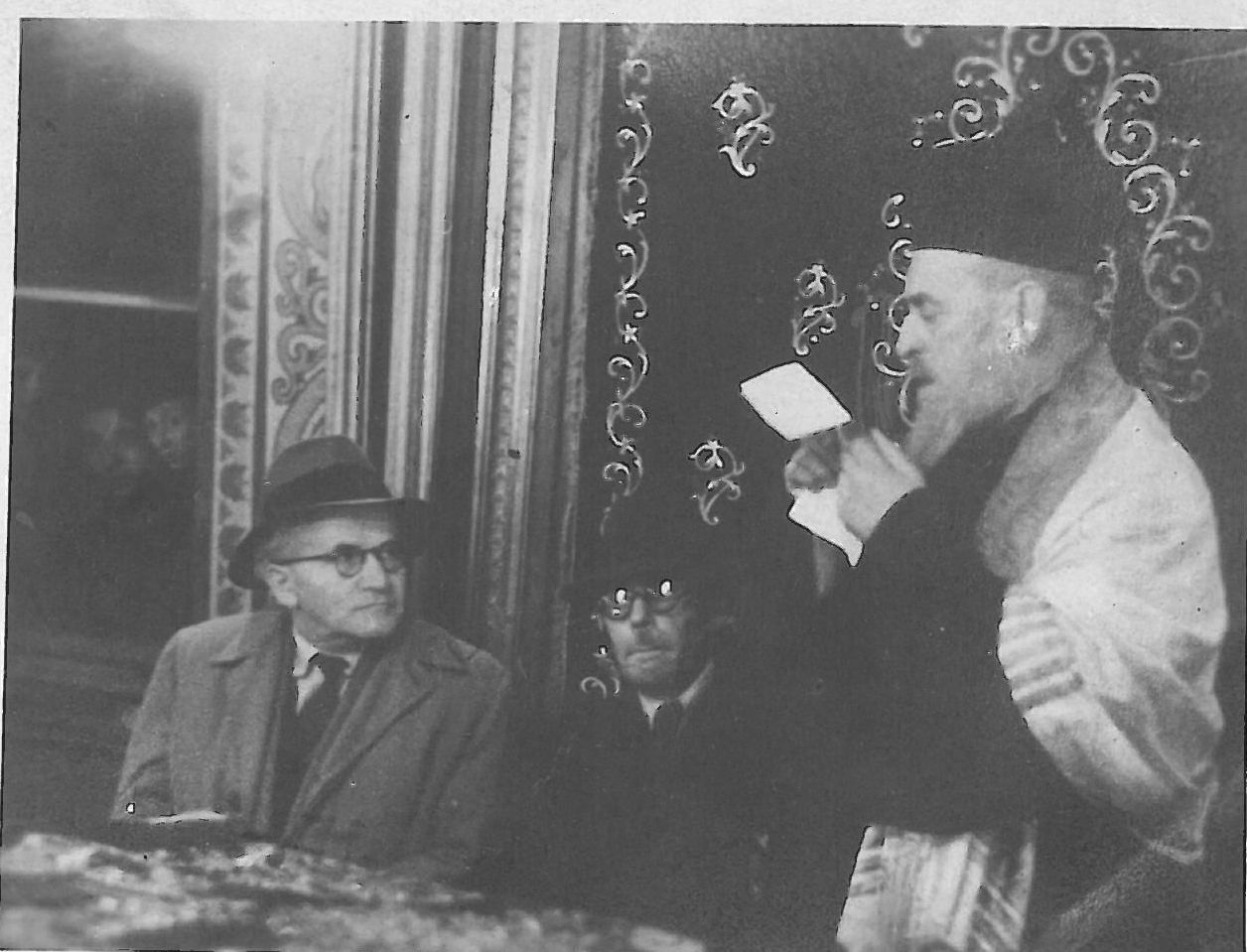
Shmuel Benjamin Bachar, Chief Rabbi of Plovdiv's Jews, at a reception for David Ben-Gurion during Ben-Gurion's December 1944 visit to the city

The Belev-Dannecker agreement provisioned for 20,000 Jews from the "New Lands" to be deported. As there were only 12,000 Jews there the remaining 8,000 were to be deported from "Old Bulgaria". The communities in Kyustendil and Plovdiv were targeted first, followed by Dupnitza, Gorna Dzhumaya and Pazardzhik. On 2 March, the Council of Ministers signed several decrees approving the deportation plans. Jews from "Old Bulgaria" were to be rounded up in local detention centres, transported to the internment camps in Lom and Somovit, and from there deported by boat up the Danube to Vienna then on to German-occupied Poland. They were to be stripped of their Bulgarian citizenship upon leaving the country, and the government agreed not to ask for their return. Importantly, the decree (Order 127) was never publicised in the state gazette and did not specifically refer to Jews from "Old Bulgaria" - something later used as an argument by opponents of the deportations.

Deportations in the "old lands" were due to begin on 9 March. News about them however was leaked as early as 4 March. Belev's secretary Liliana Panitsa (ironically later imprisoned and tortured by the communists for being the secretary of the notorious persecutor of Jews) informed her Jewish friends in Sofia of the plan. Simultaneously, Yako Baruch, an official in the illegal Zionist centre in Sofia, was informed by his brother in Kyustendil of the preparations. Feverish efforts began by the Jews to save themselves as they contacted influential friends to seek help. Baruch's meeting with his friend, Trade minister Zahariev proved crucial as Zahariev informed him of Order 127. Armed with this he met on 7 March with his old Kyustendil school friend, National Assembly vice chairman Dimitar Peshev who began to organise a protest group of MPs. A delegation of four eminent Kyustendil citizens (businessman Asen Suitchmezov, parliamentary representative Petar Mihalev, attorney Ivan Momchilov and IMRO activist Vladimir Kurtev) arriving on 9 March testified as to the preparations. On that day, Peshev and 10 other MPs met with Interior Minister Petar Gabrovski stating their intention to call an emergency debate in parliament if the order was not cancelled. Initially, the minister denied the existence of the plan, but when confronted with the exact text of the order he agreed to speak to the prime minister. Two hours later, in a second meeting, he informed them that the deportations would be cancelled.

A second dramatic action took place in Plovdiv on the same night (9 March), where around 1,500 Jews were detained awaiting deportation by train. Upon being informed, Metropolitan Kiril of Plovdiv immediately sent a protest telegram to the king and then contacted the chief of police, threatening civil disobedience (according to some reports he stated that he would lie across the train tracks if necessary). He then went to the school where the Jews were being held, jumped over the fence and spoke to the detainees, assuring them that he would go wherever they went. The emerging news of the deportations was greeted with outrage. Both opposition and government Protest letters were sent to the king (notably from the Writers' Union, the Lawyers' Union and the Doctors' Union) and eminent citizens went to petition the king in person at the palace.

Metropolitan Stefan of Sofia made a personal appeal to the king, and the Holy Synod sent an official plea on 22 March. External diplomatic pressure was also applied on the king, with the UK monarch warning his cousin of the disastrous consequences of the deportations for the monarchy. On 17 March, Peshev and another 42 government MPs filed a protest with Prime Minister Bogdan Filov against the deportation of Jews from Bulgaria. In a stormy parliamentary session on 24 March the government again prevailed and received approval for the plans. The Assembly also voted to sanction Peshev for exceeding his authority and he was dismissed from his position as vice chairman. The protests however had shaken the king enough to insist in his meeting with Hitler on 1 April that he'd given permission for deportations from the occupied territories only and that the Jews from "Old Bulgaria" were necessary for labour.

On 2 May 1943, Belev prepared a second plan which this time included all 48,000 Bulgarian Jews. Two options were presented: direct deportation of all Jews by boat to Vienna; or “deportation of all Jews from Sofia and other cities of the Kingdom”. Boris III signed off the second option and on 21 May the government authorized the Commissariat of Jewish Affairs to move Jews living in Sofia to villages and towns in the Bulgarian countryside. Jews were given three days to collect their belongings and leave the capital. The relocation orders caused a panic and resistance amongst the Sofia Jews as they assumed this was just the prelude to a deportation outside the country. Metropolitan Stefan offered to baptise any Jews that sought the protection of the church; the Ministry of Religions decided it would not recognise such baptisms and would deport any Jews christened that year regardless. Stefan threatened to reveal this to all parish priests; in response the interior ministry ordered him to close all churches in Sofia. When he refused, the interior ministry sought his arrest, but Belev intervened to prevent action being taken against him.

On 24 May a protest in Sofia was organized by about a thousand Jews and supported by other Bulgarians, including communists and Metropolitan Stefan of Sofia (who condemned government persecution of the Jews in a speech). The protest was dispersed by the police; 120 Jews were arrested and brought to the concentration camp in Somovit, and other activists were scattered throughout the country. Later that day, Metropolitan Stefan advocated for the Jews to Prime Minister Filov and tried to contact Boris III. The protest reportedly deeply affected the king and contributed to his decision to resist further pressure from Hitler. On 25 May, Jews in the larger cities began to be deported to rural settlements across Bulgaria. The deportation of Jews from Sofia began the following day, and 19,153 had left the capital by 7 June. Special trains were arranged and the Jews were assigned specific departures, separating family members. A maximum of 30 kg of property per person was allowed; the rest they were forced to sell at "abusively low" prices or to abandon. Bulgarian officials and neighbours benefited from the proceeds. Across the country, deported Jews were sheltered in the homes of local Jews or housed in empty schools. Deportation to Poland was neither cancelled nor implemented. The sudden death of Tsar Boris in August 1943 put any deportations on the backburner. With the government in turmoil Belev was ousted from his position as head of the Commissariat, putting an end to any further plans.

=== Forced labour ===
In January 1941 the Law for Protection of the Nation came into effect, which required Jews to perform compulsory labour service in lieu of military service and required that all Jews be treated as dangerous subversives. By order of the Bulgarian chief of the general staff, effective 27 January 1941, all Jewish servicemen, officers and reservists were removed from the regular armed forces and transferred to the Labour Corps, initially retaining their rank and privileges. New conscripts were directly drafted into the Labour Corps.

Repressive measures gradually increased as the war progressed. Jewish labour units were transferred from the Labour Corps to the Temporary Labour Service of the Ministry of Public Works, stripping them of their military ranks and privileges. Mandatory conscription applied from August 1941: initially men aged 20–44 were drafted, with the age limit rising to 45 in July 1942 and 50 a year later. The Jews in forced labour were faced with discriminatory policies which became stricter as time went on; with increasing length of service and decreasing the allowance of food, rest, and days off.

==== 1941 ====
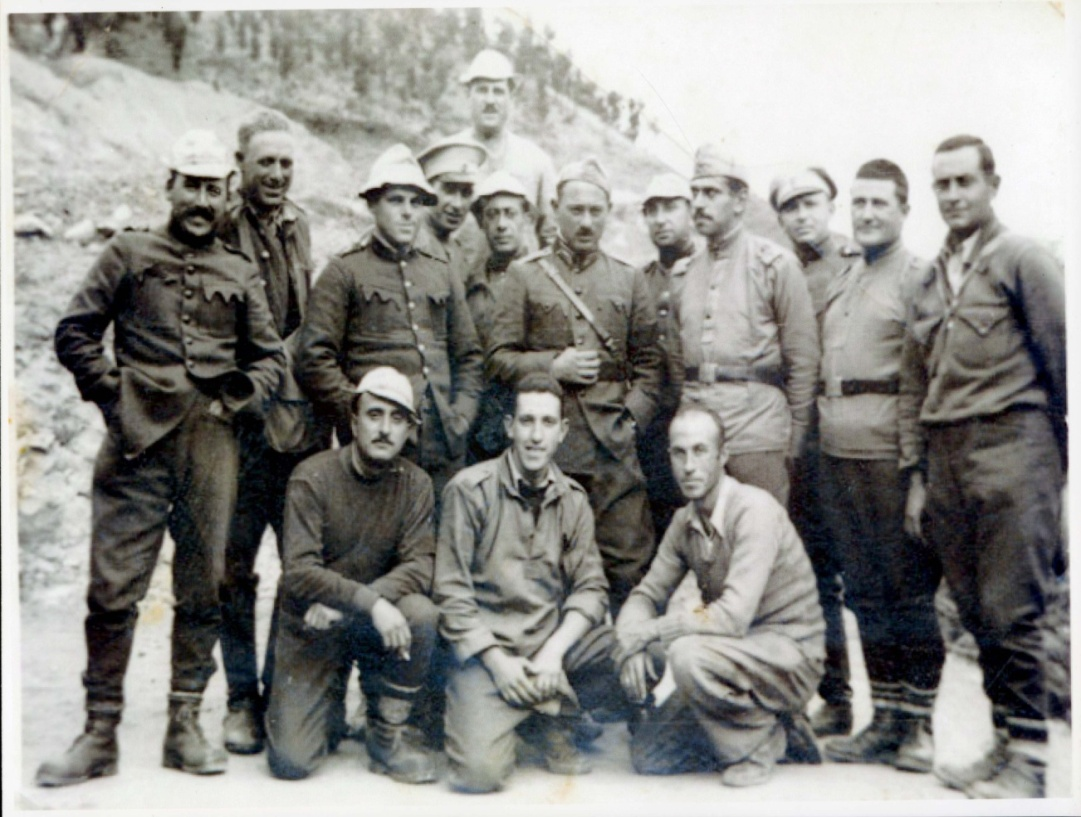
Members of Jewish labour battalion before 1942

The first camps established expressly for Jewish forced labour were opened in spring 1941, with conscripts beginning their work on 1 May. The deployment was supposed to last five months and most were released on 1 October, but some were not dismissed until November. In 1941, under overall command of General-Major Anton Stefanov Ganev, the conditions were less harsh than in the subsequent three years, because of the infrastructure of the existing Bulgarian forced labour service and the tradition of employing members of ethnic minorities, barred from carrying weapons, as uniformed engineering auxiliaries in ethnically segregated units. Turks, Pomaks, and Romani men of military age were already drafted this way, and while second-class citizens, the compulsory work was not penal servitude. Labourers were not entitled to military insignia, but were issued uniforms and military boots and allowed medical treatment. In addition, in 1941 the army continued to classify Jewish junior officers and non-commissioned officers as "reservists" and allowed them uniforms suiting their rank and command over Jews of other ranks; this ended the following year.

Nonetheless, the Jews were discriminated against; the upper age limit for labour duty was much higher for Jews than for Muslims, and unlike the Muslim draftees, the Jews were required to continue serving every year until they were either too old or unfit. Jews were detailed to do heavy construction work, while regulation practice was that in forced labour battalions (druzhina), all service personnel – medical, clerical, and signal staff, together with cooks and orderlies – were ethnic Bulgarians. Jewish labourers continued to be paid, though their wages were lower than Bulgarians'.

With Bulgaria not actively at war in 1941, the forced labourers were deployed on infrastructure projects, as they had been through the 1930s. In August 1941, at the request of Adolf-Heinz Beckerle – German Minister Plenipotentiary at Sofia – the War Ministry relinquished control of all Jewish forced labour to the Ministry of Buildings, Roads, and Public Works. Throughout the year, propaganda and news of German victories intensified antisemitism in Bulgaria, both against the labourers and their families, and expulsion or extermination of the Jews was openly advocated. That summer, Generalmajor Konstantin Hierl, head of the Reich Labour Service (Reichsarbeitsdienst), visited Bulgaria. A command from the labour corps headquarters in Sofia forbidding Jewish conscripts to take photographs regarded as "military" came on 28 October 1941, a sign the Jews' situation was worsening, and in 1942 the treatment of Jews in forced labour became far harsher.

==== 1942 ====
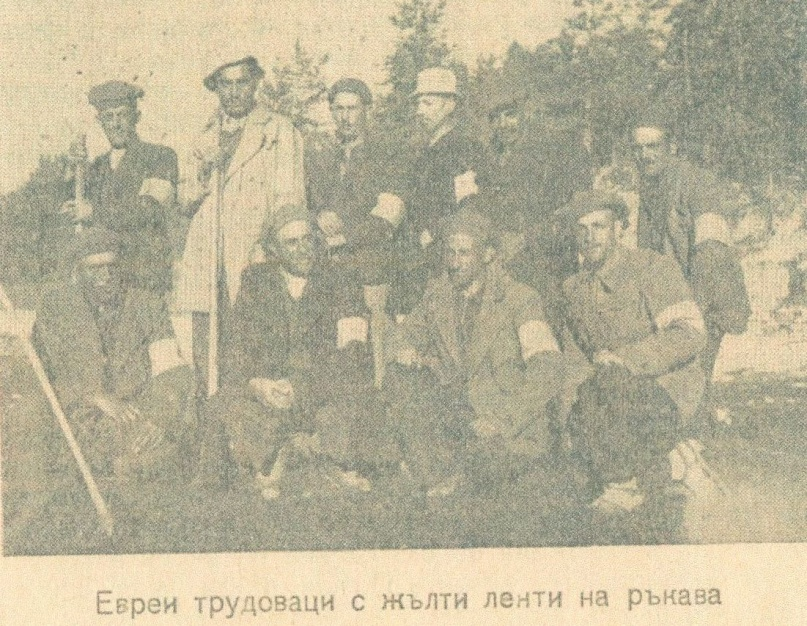
Jewish forced labourers, not entitled to boots or uniforms after 1942, wearing civilian clothes and compulsory yellow armbands.

From 1942 all Jews were entirely denied military status, whether officers, NCOs, or other ranks. Administration of Jewish forced labour was transferred to the civilian Ministry of Public Works or OSPB (Ministerstvo na obshtestvenite sgradi, pŭtishtata i blagoustroistvoto), within which a new "Bureau of Temporary Labour" or OVTP (Otdel vremenna trudova povinnost) was set up, and forced labour units of Jews, Turks, ethnic Serbs, and "unemployed" (that is, Roma) were attached to new OVTP labour battalions. The word "temporary" in the OVTP's name presaged the genocide planned for them. On 29 January 1942, new all-Jewish forced labour battalions had been announced; their number was doubled to twenty-four by the end of 1942. Jewish units were separated from the other ethnicities – three quarters of the labour battalions were from minorities: Turks, Russians, and residents of the territories occupied by Bulgaria – the rest were drawn from the Bulgarian "unemployed".

Military vocabulary was eschewed: each labour "battalion" (druzhina) was renamed "detachment" (otryad); "companies" were renamed "work groups" (trudovi grupi), each divided into "sections" (yadrovi). Forced labourers were no longer issued boots or uniforms, they had to work in civilian clothes and shoes unsuited to hard wear and extremes of weather in marshes and mountainsides; Jewish labourers were furthermore required to wear yellow badges. Nonetheless, military control over the labour battalions continued, because the government's "twin goals of somehow motivating the Jews to achieve results on construction projects, while simultaneously humiliating, robbing, beating, and undernourishing them, constituted a dilemma. A purely civilian entity lacked the means for resolving it." The Jewish company command structure of 1941 was considered too lenient towards desertion to conscripts' families in nearby cities. From 1942, Bulgarians replaced Jews in the commands of the Jewish labour units; Jewish former officers and NCOs were demoted to the ranks. In command was Polkovnik Nikola Halachev, with Polkovnik Ivan Ivanov and Podpolkovnik Todor Boichev Atanasov under him as inspectors.

Both Halachev and Atanasov displayed undisguised antisemitism. On 14 July 1942 Halachev announced new strictures: inveighing against desertion and failures to report for duty, he ordered that a punishment detachment be set up to work through the winter on a new railway line to Sidirokastro (Demir-Hisar) in occupied Greece. On the same day, deprivation of mattresses or of hot food, a "bread-and-water diet", and the barring of visitors were authorized. Visits, leave, letters and packages could be denied for three months at a time, while warm food could be withheld or bread and water rations imposed for 10 consecutive days, mattresses denied for 20 days, and blankets denied indefinitely. Any of these punishments could be imposed concurrently. Confinement to the brig was to be avoided as a punishment and these measures allowed work to continue while deprivation was enforced. A week afterwards, on 22 July, Halachev again railed against the Jews in a memorandum, castigating desertion and malingering in the infirmaries; he then forbade Jews from visiting settlements near their work sites, on the pretext that they might be able to communicate using the post office. On 15 September, Halachev banned Jewish conscripts from meeting their wives and required that food parcels Jews received had to be shared among the units.

A new tax confiscating most Jews' liquid assets was imposed in summer 1942, along with the duty of all Jews to wear yellow badges. In August 1942, the Commissariat for Jewish Affairs was created and began to register the Jewish populations of Bulgarian territory, including the occupied lands, in preparation for their deportation into Nazi hands, organized since February by Commissioner Belev. The OVTP was not, however, informed of the Commissariat's plans, and it continued to plan its construction timetables on the assumption that its Jewish work force would be available for work in the 1943 season.

==== 1943 ====
On 4 February 1943 Belev had recommended to the Council of Ministers that "swift measures" be taken to ensure the Jewish men working as forced labourers would not escape. His Commissariat for Jewish Affairs planned the destruction of Bulgaria's Jews before the end of the year. In the course of 1943 nearly all Jews in Bulgaria were incarcerated in prisons, camps, or ghettos. As round-ups of Jews began in 1943, Jews made more numerous efforts to escape and punishments became increasingly harsh. Halachev was replaced in command of the forced labour corps by Polkovnik Tsvetan Mumdzhiev. Under him were his inspectors Podpolkovnik Cholakov and Podpolkovnik Rogozarov. Mumdzhiev had commanded military labourers in 1940, during the acquisition of South Dobruja from Romania (following the Treaty of Craiova), and in 1941 Rogazarov had been commander of the 1st Jewish Labour Battalion and was known to be humane towards conscripts. At the end of March 1943, some Jewish labourers who had been doctors or pharmacists were seconded to the military districts to prevent a shortage of medical skills.

The work season mandated for conscripts began earlier than before, with some forced labourers summoned before the end of January. Jews of conscription age in occupied Macedonia were not called up, however, and remained at home while others travelled to their work sites. In February Mumdzhiev sought to eradicate the widespread practice of extorting bribes from prisoners for the granting of home leave. The divergence in policy between the OVTP and the Jewish Affairs Commissariat grew in the spring; Mumdzhiev granted, in accordance with standard army procedures, compassionate leave to many Jewish forced labourers, on the grounds their families' looming expulsion from Bulgaria constituted a family emergency. Many also deserted without leave to see their families, but even deserters remained under the OVTP's jurisdiction – unlike all the rest of Bulgaria's Jews, the Commissariat of Jewish Affairs had no control over the OVTP's forced labourers (or those in prison and directly under Interior Ministry control) and they were thus near-immune from deportations organized by Belev. In occupied Thrace, male Greek Jews were conscripted in 1943, but their families were deported to Bulgaria and thence to Treblinka. Asked to intervene on behalf of these homeless Jews by the Jews of his native city of Plovdiv, Mumdzhiev issued indefinite furlough documents at the end of the work season, rather than the usual seasonal leave papers, and "several dozen" Jews were thus shielded from the Jewish Commissariat's purview.

Jews forced to work on the new railway between Krupnik and Sidirokastro were expected to continue work until 15 December, though in the event Mumdzhiev ordered in October that the ill-equipped Jews be allowed to stop working on 15 November. Others working at Lovech were only dismissed in early December. It is not known when or if the instructions of Belev on increased security at the camps were passed to the OVTP, but it appears they were not implemented. Jewish forced labourers deserted much more often than those from other ethnicities, as most of their families had been evicted from their homes and were now restricted to transit camps and temporary ghettos to await deportation from Bulgaria; Jewish men often returned with cash their families had given them in fear of impending deportation. Although by 1944 the effective danger of deportation had passed, this was not known to the Jews, who continued to fear imminent deportation. In the winter of 1943–1944, the Jewish labourers were released from work to the temporary transit camps and ghettos established by the Commissariat for Jewish Affairs, rather than to their homes, from which most of their families were evicted earlier in 1943.

==== 1944 ====
The war was now against Germany, and the increasing successes of partisans in Bulgarian territory worsened friction between Jews and their Bulgarian overseers. Mumdzhiev's attempts to alleviate conditions at the forced labour camps were unevenly adhered to, and the dispositions of individual camp commanders towards the Jews led to varying levels of abuses. The forced labourers were again deployed to work camps, mostly building motorways and other roads. By autumn, the approach of the Red Army was the catalyst for mass desertions from the labour camps: by 5 September one Jewish unit lost 20% of its labourers and by 9 September, fewer than 20% were left and the feldfebel in command appealed in vain for the police in Plovdiv to arrest the deserters. Slowly, the Jewish forced labourers returned to their former hometowns, along with the residents of the ghettos. The general in command of the forced labour deployments, Polkovnik Tsvetan Mumdzhiev was a defendant in the People's Court Panel VII Holocaust trial, but petitions in his favour from labourers resulted in his acquittal.

=== Labour service ===
The Law for Protection of the Nation created precedents and inconsistencies with other Bulgarian laws, including the Law on Military Forces. Many Jews who were assigned to the military had to be released from service. They returned to their homes and resumed their peacetime activities. The Civilian Mobilization Directorate recommended in a report that Jews subject to recruitment in the military be redirected to the state Labor Force – a special branch, established in 1920, militarised in 1940 and existing until 2000.

Shortly after this report, a special ordinance was promulgated governing the service of the Jews in the army, which stipulated that they would be called up for employment under the Military Forces Law. They were recruited in companies in which soldiers, sergeants and officers of Jewish descent could serve together. They were recruited to do their regular labour service and the ones called for training had all the obligations and rights set out in the 1936 Disciplinary Code for Employment. To this end, Major-General Anton Ganev, the chief of the Labor Force, issued an order defining the structure and composition in terms of the recruited for training and service, as well as the mobilised ranks. In a complementary order from 18 April 1941 General Ganev pointed out that the relations with the Jews must be based on strictly established legal norms. Having in mind that most of the recruited Jews had not previously been used on physical work, they were required to meet at least 50% of the norm in the first week, 66% in the second, 75% in the third and from then on to work in accordance with the established standards. The Jewish workers had all the obligations and enjoyed all the rights that the ethnic Bulgarian workers had. With an order on 14 July 1941 Ganev defined their salary, and with another order the sergeants and officers of Jewish descent were allowed 15 days home leave in August and September 1941.

On 29 January 1942 the minister of defence of Bulgaria issued a new ordinance regarding the service of citizens of Jewish origin, according to which their service in the Labour Force was replaced with labour service at the Ministry of Public Buildings, Roads and Public Works. It retained the mechanism for engaging Bulgarian Jews to protect them from the escalation of their persecution by engaging in the Labor Force system, giving additional flexibility to the entire system of parrying the external pressure on the Jewish issue. The Jews that were found unfit for work were released from duty. During the autumn and winter the groups were released and the labour soldiers returned to their homes, to return to work the following spring.

In his diary the prime minister Bogdan Filov, after meeting with Tsar Boris on 13 April 1943, noted: "We then spoke on the Jewish issue. The Tzar thinks that we should take the able-bodied into working groups and thus avoid sending the Jews from the old borders to Poland." In a secret letter to the Legation Counselor Eberhard von Thadden, the police attaché at the German Embassy in Sofia, Adolf Hoffmann, wrote on 17 May 1943: "The Bulgarian government too transparently uses the labor force of the Jews solely as a pretext against our desired deportation of the Jews, the purpose of which is to evade it."

== Ghettos ==
Between early 1943 and late 1944, nearly all Bulgaria's surviving Jews were confined involuntarily to ghettos and transit camps as well as to the labour camps and prisons. After the protests of Dimitar Peshev and a sit-in at the office of Petar Gabrovski prompted the deferment of plans for the extermination of the remaining 8,000 Jews of the Belev-Dannecker agreement, Commissioner for Jewish Affairs Alexander Belev drew up new plans for the deportations of all Jews to be completed by September 1943. Sofia, home to half of the Jewish population, was the greatest logistical problem, and Belev arranged for a survey of vacant schools and Jewish residences throughout the provinces to determine where deportees from Sofia might be forcibly billeted in the homes of local Jews to form temporary transit ghettos before their final expulsion from Bulgaria; no consideration was given to spatial adequacy. In addition to the existing transit camps at Gorna Dzhumaya (Blagoevgrad) and Dupnitsa, another was planned at the existing internment camp at Somivit, the Danube port from where, as well Lom, Jews would be embarked on boats to transport the victims upriver out of Bulgaria. Belev had chartered six steamships for the Jews' journey and they waited in the Danube ports. Families were to be deported together, but without the working age men, who were deployed at the forced labour camps.

The first evictions were those from Sofia and Kazanlak, whose deported Jews were distributed to the temporary ghettos as planned. Their belongings were seized and the property inventoried and sold at auction by the Jewish Affairs Commissariat. The expulsion of Sofia's Jews began on 24 May 1943; they were deported to Berkovitsa, Burgas, Byala Slatina, Dupnitsa, Ferdinand, Gorna Dzhumaya, Haskovo, Karnobat, Kyustendil, Lukovit, Pleven, Razgrad, Ruse, Samokov, Shumen, Troyan, Varna, Vidin and Vratsa. Some were also sent to Stara Zagora, but were shortly afterwards expelled again and dispersed elsewhere on the orders of the Bulgarian Army, which operated a base there and objected to the Jews' presence in the city. The Jews' billets in the residences of local Jews operated as so-called open ghettos, within which Jews were confined by specific movement restrictions and a general and punitive curfew. Jews were banned from public amenities, were allowed outdoors for only a few hours a day, could not leave their assigned towns at all, and were forbidden to engage in any commerce. Jews were barred from living together with non-Jews, "Jewish residences" (Evreisko zhilishte) had to be marked as such, and Jewish people had to mark themselves with yellow badges.

The tight curfew was intended to keep the Jews concentrated to facilitate their eviction en masse at short notice, but because the ghettoization was intended to be temporary, the Jewish Affairs Commissariat did not formulate permanent ghetto restrictions centrally; instead it was the Commissariat's local "delegate", the municipal governments, and the police that were responsible for the varied ghetto policies imposed in each town. According to the Encyclopedia of Camps and Ghettos, the spring deportations' postponement left the Jewish population "in limbo — demoted to an untouchable subcaste status, penniless, uprooted, and removed from the body politic, yet not expelled beyond the country’s borders". The authority of Belev's Commissariat did not extend to non-Jews, and in consequence, it was unable to fully segregate the Jewish and non-Jewish populations by evicting non-Jews from areas deemed ghettos, which would have provoked opposition, since the Jews were invariably billeted in the older and more ethnically mixed districts, usually neighbourhoods of low-grade tenement housing. Neither did the Commissariat's powers enable it to construct physical barriers between Jews and non-Jews to create closed ghettos. The word ghetto (Bulgarian: гето, romanized: geto) was not used officially; the euphemistic "Jewish Quarter" (evreiski kvartal) was applied instead.

== Aftermath and legacy ==
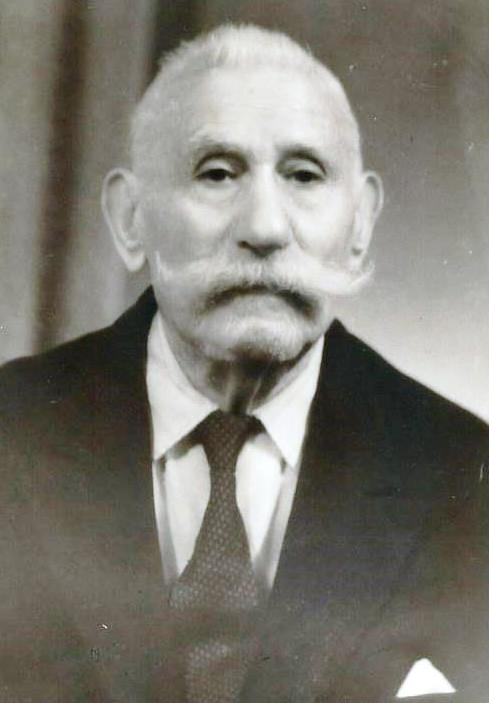
The centenarian Rafael Kamhi was among the few survivors of the Holocaust from Thessaloniki after being saved by Bulgarian authorities.

The world's first Holocaust trial was held in Bulgaria in early 1945. Earlier wartime trials had punished war criminals and others, but the "hastily convened" People's Court Panel VII tried 64 Bulgarian officials for crimes committed in the enforcement of the pro-Axis Bulgarian government's policies against the Jews as part of the Final Solution. The court was formed on the initiative of the Fatherland Front's Jewish committee. Unlike the later Nuremberg trials, and despite radical change to a communist-led government, the court's decisions were based on the pre-existing Bulgarian criminal code. Although this legitimized the new state, it made prosecutions for complicity in the mass murders itself difficult, because the regime had created the legal framework within which the crimes were lawful, like the 1940 Law for the Protection of the Nation and the 1942 decree-law. Instead, prosecutions were mainly for "incidental malfeasance" and convictions were hard to secure.

Now fighting with the Soviets against the Nazis, the Bulgarian Army tried to shield from liability officers who had abused Jewish forced labourers and lawyers engaged in the liquidation of Jews' assets mostly escaped sanction. Most defendants were acquitted or received lenient penalties and most offenders were never charged. Two death sentences were handed down, including one for Alexander Belev, but he had already died in 1944 and was tried in absentia. Shortly afterwards, records of the People's Court Panel VII trial were suppressed, including the "abundant testimony", and secreted, unpublished, in the exclusive archives of the communist People's Republic of Bulgaria's Interior Ministry. Until the end of the Cold War, they were seldom cited.

The post-war People's Republic, in accordance with communist principles, compared the survival of most of Bulgaria's wartime Jewish population to the rescue of the Jews from Nazi-occupied Denmark in 1943. State-controlled historiography attributed the survival to principled and righteous popular action by the Bulgarian people inspired by the then-outlawed Bulgarian Communist Party in 1943. The fate of the Jews of Macedonia and Thrace was "simply ignored", by which means "the narrative cast Bulgaria alongside Denmark as a nation of rescuers, even exceeding that Scandinavian country in the percentage of Jews saved". One work to make the comparison was Haim Oliver's We Were Saved: How the Jews in Bulgaria Were Kept from the Death Camps, published in Bulgarian and in English in 1967. Most of Bulgaria's surviving Jews emigrated soon after the war, joining the global Aliyah. Some Jews who stayed in the country were committed Communists that assisted in spreading the story of the 'rescue' through various media including articles in the state-controlled Sofia Jewish organization's annual volume Godishnik, and a small museum in Sofia. A publication by the Bulgarian Academy of Sciences in 1978 was typical – it was entitled: The Struggle of the Bulgarian People for the Defence and Salvation of the Jews in Bulgaria during the Second World War.

After the November 1989 fall of Communism in Bulgaria, the fate of Bulgaria's Jews remained "a cornerstone of national pride" and "an unassailable historiographic a priori". Historiographical debate focused on who should be credited with responsibility for the early 1943 'rescue'. The Tsar, the Church, and the legislators led by Dimitar Peshev all joined the Communists among those to whom responsibility was being apportioned. In reaction to the view promulgated officially by Communist Bulgarian state, a dissenting view emerged that Tsar Boris was not an antisemite or a convinced Nazi-sympathizer and should be credited with the Jews' survival. Binyamin Arditi, an Israeli politician of Bulgarian Jewish origin and sometime chair of the pre-war Zionist Organization of Bulgaria in Sofia, published The Role of King Boris in the Expulsion of Bulgarian Jewry in 1952. The view that Boris had ordered the deportations was repeated in the first major academic account of the events outside Bulgaria, the 1972 The Bulgarian Jews and the Final Solution, by Frederick B. Chary. Both Bulgarian writer Stephan Groueff's 1987 Crown of Thorns: The Reign of King Boris III of Bulgaria and Israeli politician Michael Bar-Zohar's 1998 Beyond Hitler’s Grasp: The Heroic Rescue of Bulgaria’s Jews also took this view. The perspective favouring the Tsar was also useful to his son and briefly heir as Tsar Simeon II of Saxe-Coburg-Gotha. During his tenure as Prime Minister of Bulgaria under the name Simeon Sakskoburggotsk, a 2003 resolution in the United States Congress honoured Bulgaria's saving of the Jews.

By contrast, controversy arose in Israel over a memorial to Tsar Boris at Yad Vashem in Jerusalem in 2000. A specially convened panel of jurists concluded there was historical evidence that showed Boris had personally approved the deportations of his Jewish subjects; the memorial in the Tsar's name was removed. In 2008, Bulgarian president Georgi Parvanov on a visit to Israel said Bulgaria accepted responsibility for the genocide of Jews deported from its jurisdiction. He said: "when we express justifiable pride at what we have done to save Jews, we do not forget that at the same time there was an anti-Semitic regime in Bulgaria and we do not shirk our responsibility for the fate of more than 11,000 Jews who were deported from Thrace and Macedonia to death camps".

The role of Dimitar Peshev, recognized as Righteous Among the Nations by Yad Vashem, was emphasized by Italian journalist of Bulgarian Jewish heritage Gabriele Nissim in his 1998 L’uomo che fermò Hitler ["The Man Who Stopped Hitler"]. His petition of 17 March 1943 was inspired by Jewish residents in his constituency, who were ultimately not exterminated on the same timetable as Jews outside the 1940 borders of Bulgaria as planned but were nonetheless deported from Kyustendil for ghettos in the countryside. Tzvetan Todorov highlighted Peshev's role in 1999 using excerpts of Peshev's post-war diary in La fragilité du bien: le sauvetage des juifs bulgares ["The Fragility of Good: the Rescue of the Bulgarian Jews"]. After the judgement reached in 2000 in Israel on the culpability of Boris III for the massacre of the Macedonian and Thracian Jews, Todorov's book's English translation was released in 2001 with the subtitle's wording changed to Why Bulgaria's Jews Survived the Holocaust.

Also in 1999, Nissim's work L’uomo che fermò Hitler appeared in Bulgarian translation, published with assistance from the Bulgarian National Assembly. Subsequently, official commemoration of Peshev intensified. Statues, postage stamps, and other honours followed. In 2002, the Dimitar Peshev House-Museum was inaugurated in Kyustendil, Peshev's home town, to commemorate his life and actions to prevent the deportation of Bulgarian Jews during the Holocaust. In 2013, a street intersection outside the Bulgarian embassy in Washington, DC was named Dimitar Peshev Plaza. This move was opposed by the United States Holocaust Memorial Museum; the antisemitic Law for the Protection of the Nation was supported by Peshev in the winter of 1940–1941.

In 2002, the synod of the Bulgarian Orthodox Church published protocols (later translated into English and entitled The Power of Civil Society in a Time of Genocide: Proceedings of the Holy Synod of the Bulgarian Orthodox Church on the Rescue of the Jews in Bulgaria, 1940-1944) emphasizing the role its members played in the Bulgarian Jews survival, a perspective less politically fraught than praise of the Tsar. Proponents advocate the award of a corporate Nobel Peace Prize to the Church, in spite of a paucity of evidence that Church statements and the imprecations of the Metropolitans of Sofia and Plovdiv were heeded or anything other than dismissed by Boris.

The 73rd anniversary – 10 March 2016 – of the cancelling of the deportations was commemorated in Bulgaria as Holocaust Memorial Day. A monument of gratitude for the rescue of Bulgarian Jews from the Holocaust was dedicated in the presence of the Israeli ambassador and other dignitaries in Bourgas, Bulgaria, 75 years after the rescue of the Bulgarian Jews and the deportation of Jews from areas of northern Greece and Yugoslavia under Bulgarian administration. The rescue of the Bulgarian Jews has been feted by some historians, including Bulgarians and Jews alike, as a remarkable act of heroic defiance, while some other historians describe it as an "eleventh hour" episode of cynical opportunism that occurred due to the desire for favourable treatment if and when the Nazis lost the war, noting the much less rosy fate of Jews in Macedonia and Thrace, while still others take a middle position.

== In popular media ==
In 2012, The Third Half, a Macedonian-Czech-Serbian movie about Macedonian football during World War II, and the deportation of Jews from Yugoslav Macedonia presented through the real-life story of Neta Koen, a Holocaust survivor, was shortlisted as the country's entry for Best Foreign Language Oscar at the 85th Academy Awards, but it did not make the final cut for nomination.

== See also ==
- History of the Jews in Bulgaria
- The Holocaust
- Jewish history
- Nazi war crimes
- Rescue of the Danish Jews

== Bibliography ==
- Bar Zohar, Michael (1998). Beyond Hitler's Grasp. The Heroic Rescue of Bulgaria's Jews. Holbrook: Adams Media Corporation.
- Boyadjieff, Christo (1989). Saving the Bulgarian Jews. Ottawa: Free Bulgarian Center.
- Chary, Frederick B. (1972). The Bulgarian Jews and the final solution, 1940-1944. University of Pittsburgh Press. ISBN 9780822932512.
- Cohen, David (1995). Оцеляването [The Survival]. Sofia: Shalom.
- Ioanid, Radu (2010) "Occupied and Satellite States." P. Hayes & J. K. Roth (eds.) The Oxford Handbook of Holocaust Studies. Oxford: Oxford University Press.
- Nissim, Gabriele (1998). L'uomo che fermo Hitler. Milan: Mondadori.
- Oliver, Haim (1978). We Were Saved: How the Jews in Bulgaria Were Kept from the Death Camps. Sofia: Sofia Press.
- Todorov, Tzvetan (2001). The Fragility of Goodness. Why Bulgaria's Jews Survived the Holocaust. London: Weidenfeld & Nicolson.
- "Bulgaria", United States Holocaust Memorial Museum, Holocaust Encyclopedia, https://encyclopedia.ushmm.org/content/en/article/bulgaria
- The power of the civil society: Proceedings of the Holy Synod of the Bulgarian Orthodox Church on the Rescue of the Jews in Bulgaria (1940-1944), Sofia, 2005, The Sofia University Center for Jewish Studies, Sofia University Press St. Kliment Ohridski, ISBN 954-07-2122-9
- Comforty, Jacky; Aladjem Bloomfield, Martha (2021). The Stolen Narrative of the Bulgarian Jews and the Holocaust. Maryland: Rowman & Littlefield. p. 456. ISBN 978-1-7936-3291-3. Archived from the original on 29 March 2021.
