= Adolf-Heinz Beckerle =

German politician, SA officer, and diplomat

- Born: 4 February 1902; Frankfurt am Main, Province of Hesse-Nassau, Kingdom of Prussia, German Empire
- Died: 3 April 1976 (aged 74); Frankfurt am Main, Hesse, West Germany
- Years active: 1922–1968
- Known for: German ambassador to Bulgaria

Adolf-Heinz Beckerle (4 February 1902 – 3 April 1976) was a German politician, SA officer and diplomat who played a significant role in the Holocaust in Bulgaria.

== Völkisch Activist ==
Beckerle was born in Frankfurt am Main, the son of a post office official. Beckerle was educated at the elementary school and at the Realgymnasium (the type of high school that prepares one for university in Germany) in Frankfurt from 1908 to 1921. In March 1921, he passed the Abitur (university entrance exam). From 1921 to 1927, he attended the University of Frankfurt, where he graduated with a degree in economics in 1927. While at university, he joined a fraternity, the Coburger Convent. In 1921–1922, he served in the Reichswehr as a reserve officer. As a student, he also became active in several völkisch groups on campus, joining the Viking League in 1922. On 29 August 1922, he joined the NSDAP, but dropped out shortly afterwards. Beckerle broke off his studies several times, serving in May 1925 – June 1926 as an officer candidate with the Prussian police.

Beckerle made regular trips to South America in the 1920s which he regarded as a backward continent full of backward people that might one day be colonised by Germany. Beckerle's only book was an autobiographical adventure novel set in South America whose hero was a thinly disguised version of himself. The book Wir wollten arbeiten: Erlebnisse deutscher Auswanderer in Südamerika (We wanted to work: Experiences of German emigrants in South America) was published under the pseudonym Heinz Edelmann. The plot of Wir wollten arbeiten concerned an young German man, disillusioned with the Weimar Republic, who travels to South America, depicted in colonialist terms as a place of bountiful natural resources mostly inhabited by racially inferior people of entirely or partial indigenous descent which was waiting to be exploited by Aryans. German immigrants to South America are depicted in the most positive terms as a people who bring order and prosperity to wherever they go. After many adventures in South America, the hero learns in 1925 that Adolf Hitler has been released from prison, which shows that there is still hope for Germany and inspires him to return to the Fatherland to join the Nazi "freedom struggle". Though the book was published in 1942, much of the book had been written in the 1920s during Beckerle's visits to South America. The choice of the pseudonym Edelmann ("noble person") revealed much about Beckerle's desire for social advancement. Reflecting the völkisch concept that art, politics, culture and race were all one and the same, Beckerle saw himself as a Führungspersönlichkeit (a "political leader"), a natural leader of men and an artist who was just as comfortable writing a poem as he was fighting in a street brawl.

On 1 September 1928, he rejoined the NSDAP while also joining the SA. On 1 April 1929, he became the leader of the SA detachment in Frankfurt. Beckerle was unusual among the SA leaders in that he was too young to have served in either the First World War and/or the Freikorps, and to make up for his lack of military experience, he became an especially zealous Nazi. From July 1931 to April 1932, he served as the leader of the SA group Hessen-Nassau South. On 24 April 1932, he was elected to the Landtag of Prussia as a Nazi. On 31 July 1932, he was elected to the Reichstag on the Nazi ticket from electoral constituency 19 (Hesse-Nassau) and retained this seat until the fall of the Nazi regime in May 1945.

== Under the Third Reich ==
On 1 March 1933, he was promoted to the rank of Gruppenführer. From 1 July 1933 to 31 January 1942, he was in charge of the SA detachment in Hesse. On 14 September 1933, he was appointed acting police chief of Frankfurt and in February 1934 was appointed full-time police chief. Beckerle was one of the SA leaders scheduled for execution by the SS during the Night of Long Knives and only narrowly escaped execution due to the personal intervention of Adolf Hitler himself. Hitler's intervention in 1934 guaranteed Beckerle's unflinching loyalty towards der Führer that lasted for the rest of his life. On 27 February 1935, he married the actress Silke Edelmann. In 1937, he was promoted to the rank of SA-Obergruppenführer. As police chief of Frankfurt and SA leader, Beckerle played a major role in the Kristallnacht pogrom in Frankfurt, organising the burning of all the synagogues in Frankfurt.

After Germany invaded Poland in September 1939, Beckerle served as the police chief of Łódź, Poland from September 1939 to November 1939 where he was noted for his harsh treatment of the Polish, Jewish and Romany communities in Łódź. In report he wrote in the fall of 1939, Beckerle called the Jewish community in Łódź one of "the most dirty places of the most disgusting East European Jewry". Beckerle wrote about how much he hated the Orthodox Jewish men of Łódź in their long breads and "draped in dirty caftans" and the "insolent Jewish women". A leitmotiv of his report was linking the Ashkenazim (Yiddish-speaking Jews) with dirt and filth. From November 1939 – June 1940, Beckerle served in the Wehrmacht.

== Minister in Sofia ==
In January 1941, long-standing rivalries between the Auswärtiges Amt (Foreign Office) and the SS exploded with the attempted coup d'état in Bucharest that saw SS back the coup by the Iron Guard under its leader Horia Sima against the Prime Minister, General Ion Antonescu while the Auswärtiges Amt together with the Wehrmacht backed Antonescu. In the aftermath of the coup, the Foreign Minister Joachim von Ribbentrop made an effort to club the power of the SS to conduct a foreign policy independent of the Auswärtiges Amt. Taking an advantage of the long-standing rivalries between the SS and the SA, in 1941, Ribbentrop appointed an assemblage of SA men to head the German embassies in Eastern Europe, with Beckerle going to Bulgaria, Manfred Freiherr von Killinger going to Romania, Siegfried Kasche to Croatia, Dietrich von Jagow to Hungary, and Hanns Ludin to Slovakia in order to ensure that there would be minimal co-operation with the SS. The SA leader Viktor Lutze was asked by Martin Luther for a list of SA officers suitable to serve as diplomats and Beckerle was one of the names on the list. The role of the SA ambassadors was that of "quasi-Reich governors" as they aggressively supervised the internal affairs of the nations they were stationed in, making them very much unlike traditional ambassadors. The German historian Daniel Siemens wrote that it was significant that four of the five SA ambassadors had served as policemen in their careers, suggesting it was their ability to impose their will on others as police chiefs that led to them being appointed as ambassadors.

The role of the SA ambassadors were conceived of as being an essentially colonial role whose task was to impose the power the German state onto "the natives" rather than that of a traditional diplomat, whose role was to conduct relations between theoretically equal nations. It was believed that Beckerle's role in forcefully upholding the authority of the German state as the police chief of Frankfurt and then in Łódź prepared him well for a diplomatic mission in Bulgaria. From the viewpoint of Berlin, southeast Europe was viewed as the ergänzungsraum ("complementary space") to the lebensraum ("living space") in Eastern Europe. Unlike the lebensraum, which was to be colonised with millions of German settlers while the indigenous peoples living there would be exterminated, expelled or enslaved, the ergänzungsraum were seen as a source of food, raw materials and manpower that would assist the Reich in its quest for "world power status". Because the states in the ergänzungsraum were not to be colonised, the role of these states were seen as essentially protectorates of Germany that would be allowed a nominal independence as long as they played their role in the "New Order in Europe". The nations marked out as being in Germany's lebensraum such as Poland and the Soviet Union were often described by Hitler and the other Nazi leaders as the "wild East", which like the "wild West" in the 19th century was to be conquered with the indigenous peoples displaced. By contrast, the model for the states in the ergänzungsraum were the princely states of the Raj. In just in the same way that Indian maharajahs of the Princely states were allowed a nominal independence, but the real power rested with the British "resident" stationed to monitor the maharajah, Hitler emulated this practice starting with the Protectorate of Bohemia-Moravia as the German media quite explicitly compared the relationship between the Reich Protector, Baron Neurath who provided "avuncular guidance" to President Hácha to that of a British "resident" and an Indian maharajah. Significantly, the five SA ambassadors in south-east Europe were all told that their diplomatic postings were only temporary, and that after the "final victory" the German embassies and legations in Bratislava, Zagreb, Sofia, Bucharest, and Budapest would all be converted into formal colonial institutions along the same lines as the Protectorate of Bohemia-Moravia.

On 28 June 1941, he arrived in Sofia, Bulgaria as the German minister-plenipotentiary (ambassador). Beckerle was so crude and vulgar in his manners that King Boris III almost refused to allow him to present his credentials at the Vrana Palace. The king much preferred that Beckerle's predecessor, Herbert von Richthofen, stay on. It was a great relief to Boris that Beckerle did not press for a Bulgarian declaration of war against the Soviet Union, which would be unpopular in traditionally Russophile Bulgaria. The Russo-Ottoman war of 1877–1878, which saw the Imperial Russian Army expel the Ottomans from Bulgaria led the Russians to be viewed as liberators in Bulgaria, and Boris was highly concerned about being forced to make an unpopular declaration of war. However, Bulgaria's biggest export was tobacco with some 80% of the tobacco harvest going to Germany by 1940, giving the Reich a powerful form of economic leverage over Bulgaria.

Beckerle saw his duty in Bulgaria to "represent National Socialism in its entirety". His overbearing, arrogant and bullying manner did not impress either the king or the Bulgarian elite in general. At least part of the reason for Beckerle's appointment in Sofia was the perception in Berlin that the anti-Semitic laws in Bulgaria, most notably the Law for Protection of the Nation passed in December 1940, were not being enforced with sufficient vigor and it was believed that his background as a tough police chief would motivate a more aggressive enforcement of the laws. Beckerle's presence did yield results as over the next 18 months a series of decrees were passed to ensure that the Law for Protection of the Nation would be enforced while the definition of Jewishness was changed from being religious to racial and a 20% surtax was applied to all Jewish businesses. During the course of the years 1940–44, the Jewish community in Bulgaria was systematically impoverished with some 95% of Bulgarian Jews living in poverty by 1942. As harvesting and refining tobacco was the biggest industry in Bulgaria and many Bulgarian Jews were involved in the tobacco business, a host of German businessmen descended upon Bulgaria looking to buy on the cheap the businesses formally owned by the Jews. As a minister-plenipotentiary, Beckerle supported the efforts of German businessmen to play a larger role in the Bulgarian economy.

Reflecting his self-image as a great artist who would bring the benefits of German power and culture to the Balkans, Beckerle spent his spare time in Sofia writing poems and short stories while also drypointing. Beckerle was shocked to learn that the professional diplomats of the Auswärtiges Amt did not accept his claims to be a cultured man and instead learned from one diplomat at the legation in Sofia that he and the other SA ambassadors were seen to be "brutal KZ [concentration camp] men with a personal concentration camp at their disposal". The five SA ambassadors had all known each other from the 1920s onward and formed a very tight clique who were so close that the five ambassadors and their families took their summer vacations together, a practice the families continued after 1945. The five ambassadors also exchanged information on a regular basis, and Beckerle was especially close to Kasche who was serving as the German minister-plenipotentiary in Zagreb. Beckerle was extremely unpopular in Bulgaria and even the Bulgarian volksdeutsche (ethnic German) community leaders whom he sought to cultivate intensely disliked him. His diary shows that he was extremely lonely in Sofia and homesick for Germany as he expressed considerable disdain for Bulgaria. The fact that Bulgaria until late 1943 was spared from the Allied strategic bombing offensive was for Beckerle the only consolation to serving in Bulgaria as he expressed much concern in his diary that he might be killed in an Allied bombing raid.

During his time as ambassador, Beckerle pressured the Bulgarian government to do its part in "Final Solution of the Jewish Question". In July 1942, he scored a success when he reported that he had pressured the Bulgarian government to agree to allow Bulgarian Jews living in Germany and in places occupied by Germany to be deported to the death camps. Despite Beckerle's efforts, laws meant to stigmatize Jews such as the wearing of the yellow star were not widely enforced, and it was estimated in October 1942 that only 20% of Bulgarian Jews were wearing the yellow star on a daily basis. By contrast, measures to confiscate property and business owned by Jews proceeded with much vigor. In October 1941, in one of the first acts of resistance in Bulgaria, a Bulgarian Jewish Communist named Leon Tadzher blew up a fuel depot in Ruse. Beckerle, who prided himself on his toughness, demanded in retaliation that the Bulgarian government execute 50 Jews in Sofia and another 50 Jews in Ruse, saying that the only way for the state to fight "terrorism" was with even greater terror. The Bulgarians refused, saying it would shock public opinion if the government were to resort to such methods. In July 1942, Josef Geron, the president of the central consistory of the Jews, sent a telegram to King Boris for the fifth birthday of Crown Prince Simeon, which led the king to send back a telegram thanking Geron and the rest of Bulgarian Jewish community for their well wishes to his son. The telegrams were then published in the Bulletin of the Central Consistory of the Jews in Bulgaria. Through the exchange of telegrams was quite routine, Beckerle was greatly exercised by what his staff had told him had been published in the Bulletin, causing him to send a stream of excited dispatches to Berlin, warning that the king was falling under "Jewish influence". In August 1942, the Bulgarian government set up a Commissariat of Jewish Affairs headed by an anti-Semitic lawyer, Alexander Belev, whose major concern at first was seizing assets owned by Jews. The staff of the Commissariat of Jewish Affairs-who were mostly lawyers and accountants-tended to be more motivated by greed than by hatred, and though extremely efficient when it came to asset-seizing, the staff were also very corrupt and took bribes for exemptions from the anti-Semitic laws. Beckerle complained in his dispatches to Berlin about the venality of the commissariat, saying that for, all their zeal when it came to asset-seizing, the staff of the commissariat had also allowed a number of wealthy Bulgarian Jews to illegally leave Bulgaria for Turkey and thence for Palestine.

On 16 October 1942, Martin Luther, the head of the Jewish Office in the Auswärtiges Amt, ordered Beckerle "to discuss the question of a transport to the East of the Jews due to resettlement under the new Bulgarian regulations". Beckerle met with the Bulgarian Prime Minister Bogdan Filov, who told him that he welcomed the German offer, but stated that the "resettlement in the East" would have to wait for some time as his government wanted to use the Bulgarian Jews for "road-building". After meeting with Filov in November 1942, Beckerle reported to Berlin the deportation of "the majority of the Bulgarian Jews" was still possible in the near-future. In early 1943, Filov told Beckerle that he learned via the Swiss minister that the British government was prepared to accept 5,000 Bulgarian Jewish children whose parents held valid passports into the Palestine Mandate (modern Israel) via Turkey. Beckerle played a major role in vetoing this offer, saying he did not want to see any Jews leave Bulgaria. On 22 February 1943, an agreement was signed calling for the "resettlement" of 20,000 Jews from Bulgaria to Poland.

The first deportation of Jews from areas under Bulgarian control took place on 4 March 1943 in what had formerly been Greek Macedonia and Thrace. The attempt to deport Bulgarian Jews from "old Bulgaria" (i.e. pre-1941 Bulgaria) provoked widespread protests as various politicians; community leaders; the Orthodox Metropolitan of Sofia, Stefan; and a great many ordinary Bulgarians all protested, starting on 9 March 1943. On 10 March 1943, the government announced that the deportations from "old Bulgaria" would cease, and the police were ordered to free the Jews they had arrested the previous day. Belev was furious with the protests that occurred on 9–10 March 1943 in "old Bulgaria" and promised Becklele that the halt order was only "temporary", saying that the Bulgarian people needed to be "educated" more via antisemitic propaganda before the Jews could be deported from "old Bulgaria". However, the government never gave the Jews living in "new Bulgaria" as the annexed regions were called Bulgarian citizenship and on 11 March 1943 deportations began in what had been Yugoslav Macedonia. After 10 March 1943, the Bulgarians refused to deport the Jews who lived within the pre-1941 frontiers of Bulgaria, but agreed to deport the Jews from the areas that Bulgaria had annexed in 1941, namely Yugoslav Macedonia together with Greek Macedonia and Greek Thrace. The position of the Bulgarian government was that the Jews living in "new Bulgaria" were Yugoslav or Greek citizens, and thus of lesser concern. Unlike the Jews with Bulgarian citizenship in "old Bulgaria", the Jews living in "new Bulgaria" were considered to be "Serbs" and "Greeks" by the Bulgarian state and by many ordinary Bulgarians.

On 21 March 1943, Beckerle arrived in Skopje, the former capital of Yugoslav Macedonia (modern North Macedonia), to personally oversee the deportation of the Jews of Skopje to Treblinka. Accompanying Beckerle to Skopje were the Bulgarian Jewish Affairs commissioner Alexander Belev, SS-Hauptsturmführer Theodor Dannecker, and two police chiefs, Penco Lukov and Zahari Velkov. After being greeted by the mayor and police chief of Skopje at the train station and attending a ceremony where Stojan Novakovic Street was renamed in his honor, Beckerle went to the tobacco warehouse where the Jews of Skopje were being held. The police rounded up 3,943 Jews from Skopje and forced them into the Monopole tobacco warehouse to be joined by 3,342 Jews from Bitola in what came to be known as the "tobacco camp" where the "galling stench of tobacco permeated the skin, hair, the bones" as one survivor put it. Beckerle personally oversaw the marching out of the inmates from the "tobacco camp" to be loaded onto the freight-cars that took them to Treblinka. To avoid the sort of protests that occurred in "old Bulgaria", the trains that took the Jews from Skopje to Treblinka did not cross "old Bulgaria" and instead went north into Serbia. Beckerle was "significantly" involved in the deportation of about 11,000 Jews from the annexed areas of greater Bulgaria to Auschwitz.

From April 1943 – July 1943, Beckerle worked closely with SS-Hauptsturmführer Theodor Dannecker in plans to deport the Bulgarian Jews, but in July 1943 he was forced to report that "to insist on the deportation at the present time makes no sense whatever" as the Bulgarian government was not prepared to co-operate. In June 1943, he complained in a dispatch to Berlin about the "Bulgarian mentality", charging that the Bulgarians lived in a multicultural society typical of the Balkans with substantial Greek, Armenian, and "Gypsy" (Romany) minorities and so were not obsessed with racial purity in the same way that people in northern Europe were. In the same dispatch, Beckerle complained that most Bulgarian Jews were lower-class artisans and "diligent workers", and so the propaganda portraying the Jews as either exploitative capitalists or alternatively as an underclass living in criminality and "filth" was ineffective. Beckerle did not mention this, but at least one of the reasons for the failure of anti-Semitic propaganda in Bulgaria was because there was much greater prejudice directed against the Turkish minority who numbered about a half million people.

In August 1943, King Boris III of Bulgaria suddenly died after a meeting with Hitler. Several German doctors told Beckerle that the possibility of the king being poisoned could not be ruled out, saying a more through autopsy would be needed to determine the cause of Boris's death. Beckerle ordered the doctors not to speak to anyone about this possible cause of Boris's death, and in a dispatch to Berlin stated that the doctors believed it was possible that the king had been poisoned without stating his view of the issue. As late as January 1944, he thought it was still "possible" that the Bulgarians might finally agree to deport the rest of the Jews. On 7 September 1944, the Soviet Union declared war on Bulgaria and invaded. Within a day, Bulgaria had signed an armistice with the Soviets. On 18 September 1944, Beckerle was captured by the Red Army in Svilengrad while attempting to flee to Turkey. After his capture, Beckerle expressed considerable pride in his role in deporting the Jews from Macedonia and Thrace, saying it was his greatest achievement.

== After the war ==
A Soviet military court convicted Beckerle of war crimes and sentenced him to 25 years of hard labor. On 13 October 1955, the Soviet government released the last of the German prisoners and Beckerle was one of those freed. Upon his return to Frankfurt, Beckerle was greeted as a hero with the mayor of Frankfurt shaking his hand. To compensate him for his suffering in the Soviet Union, a court awarded Beckerle 6,000 deutschmarks. However, Beckerle was saddened to learn that his wife had committed suicide in 1951 after the Jewish owners of a luxurious villa he had "Aryanized" in the 1930s successfully sued to get it back. The award of compensation to Beckerle was controversial as Beckerle was a diplomat, not a POW. The Association of Politically Persecuted Social Democrats complained about this award, stating "with indignation the crying injustice" of the financial compensation to a war criminal. Beckerle was investigated for acts of persecution he had committed as police chief of Frankfurt against anti-Nazis, but the prosecutor-general of Hesse closed the case in 1957 without bringing charges. Under West German law in the 1950s–1980s, Nazis could be prosecuted if it could be shown that they acted for "base motives" on their own, while those who merely obeyed the law at the time such Beckerle usually enjoyed legal immunity.

Afterwards, he settled in Neu-Isenburg, where he worked as a notary. Fritz Bauer, a German Jewish prosecutor in Hesse – who was one of the few German prosecutors who actively pursued Nazi war criminals in the 1950s – opened an investigation of Beckerle after it was decided not to charge him with political persecution in 1957. In September 1959, Bauer had Beckerle arrested and charged for his role in arranging the deportation of Jews from greater Bulgaria. Beckerle's lawyers were able to delay the proceedings and his trial did not finally begin until November 1967. In 1965, Beckerle was interviewed at his home by the American historian Frederick B. Chary who was writing a PhD thesis on wartime Bulgaria, where he insisted that he was really opposed to the Nazi regime and successfully worked to save Bulgaria's Jewish population from deportation. Chary wrote in 2014 that nearly everything Beckerle had told him was a lie.

In what appeared to be an attempt at blackmail, when the trial finally began in 1967, Beckerle's lawyers tried repeatedly to call the West German chancellor Kurt Georg Kiesinger – who was a friend of Beckerle under the Third Reich – as a witness for his trial. Kiesinger had been a member of the National Socialist Legal Guild and the NSDAP in the Nazi era and through he joined both only for opportunistic reasons as he was an ambitious lawyer hoping to advance his career, his past was a constant issue during his chancellorship. On 27 June 1968, in an unusual legal ruling, the judge declared that Beckerle's health was such that to try him might kill him and dismissed all of the charges against him. Beckerle died of a heart attack in 1976, a free man.

== Books and articles ==
- Bloch, Michael (1992). Ribbentrop. New York: Crown Publishers. ISBN 0517593106.
- Browning, Christopher R. (1978). The Final Solution and the German Foreign Office: A Study of Referat D III of Abteilung Deutschland 1940-1943. Madison: University of Wisconsin. ISBN 0841904030.
- Campbell, Bruce (2004). The SA Generals and the Rise of Nazism. Lexington: University of Kentucky. ISBN 0813190983.
- Chary, Frederick B. (1972). The Bulgarian Jews and the Final Solution, 1940-1944. Pittsburgh: University of Pittsburgh. ISBN 0822976013.
- Chary, Frederick B. (2014). Chutzpah and Naivete. Bloomington: Xlibris Corporation. ISBN 978-1499044423.
- Groueff, Stephane (1998). The Crown of Thorns: The Reign of King Boris III of Bulgaria, 1918-1943. Lanham: Madison Books. ISBN 1461730538.
- Kakel, Carroll (2011). The American West and the Nazi East: A Comparative and Interpretive Perspective. London: Palgrave Macmillan. ISBN 978-0230275157.
- Jacobsen, Hans-Adolf (1999). "The Structure of Nazi Foreign Policy, 1933-1945". In Christian Leitz (ed.). The Third Reich The Essential Readings. Blackwell. pp. 49–94. ISBN 9-780631-207009.
- Lebel, G'eni; Lebl, Ženi (2008). Tide and Wreck: History of the Jews of Vardar Macedonia. New Haven: Avotaynu. ISBN 978-1886223370.
- Longerich, Peter L. (2010). Holocaust: The Nazi Persecution and Murder of the Jews. Oxford: Oxford University Press. ISBN 978-0192804365.
- Neuburger, Mary (2012). Balkan Smoke: Tobacco and the Making of Modern Bulgaria. Ithaca: Cornell University Press. ISBN 978-0801465949.
- Siemens, Daniel (2017). Stormtroopers: A New History of Hitler's Brownshirts. New Haven: Yale University Press. ISBN 978-0300231250.
- Strobl, Gerwin (2000). The Germanic Isle: Nazi Perceptions of Britain. Cambridge: Cambridge University Press. ISBN 0521782651.
