= The Holocaust in Bulgarian-occupied Greece =

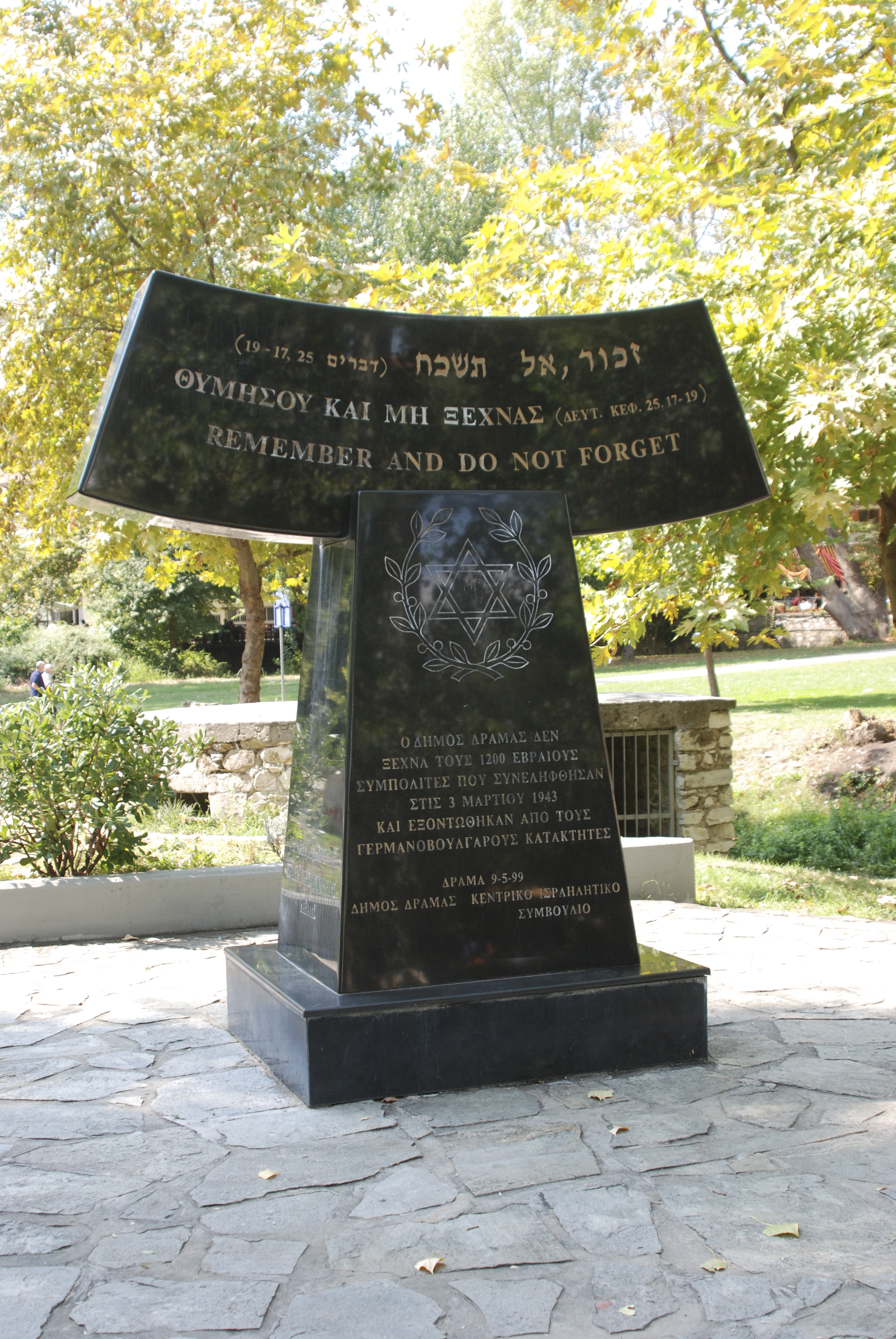
Holocaust memorial in Drama, Greece

In March 1943, about 4,075 Jews living in Bulgarian-occupied eastern Greek Macedonia and Western Thrace (annexed as the Bulgarian province of Belomorie) were deported to Treblinka extermination camp and murdered. In an operation coordinated by Bulgaria and Germany, almost all Jews in Bulgarian-occupied Greece were rounded up on the early morning of 4 March 1943, held in camps in Bulgaria, and reached Treblinka by the end of the month. The death rate of 97 percent of the Jews living in the area in 1943 was one of the highest in Europe.

== Background ==
The ancient Greek-speaking Romaniote Jewish communities of Thrace and Macedonia were almost erased by their forced resettlement in Constantinople in 1455 by the Ottoman sultan Mehmet II. At the end of the fifteenth century, the Ottomans allowed Judeo-Spanish-speaking Sephardic Jews who had been expelled from Spain to resettle the area; they were joined by later Ashkenazi migrants, but the Sephardim remained dominant.

The area was conquered from the Ottoman Empire by Bulgaria during the Balkan Wars, but its western part (Eastern Macedonia) was ceded to Greece afterwards. The Greek part was occupied by Bulgaria during World War I. Greece regained it, including the Bulgarian eastern part (Western Thrace), per the 1919 Treaty of Neuilly. It provided for a mandatory population exchange that tilted the region's demography in favor of Greeks.

== Bulgarian occupation ==
In April 1941, the German invasion of Greece resulted in the occupation of all of the country. Some Jews tried to flee via Turkey, but most were turned back at the border.

In mid-1941, Greece was partitioned into different occupation zones by Germany, Italy, and Bulgaria. Germany occupied strategically important areas, including Salonica and the surrounding area and a strip of land along what had been Greece's border with Turkey. Western Thrace and eastern Macedonia were annexed as the Bulgarian province of Belomorie, where Bulgaria immediately undertook a harsh Bulgarianization program. Bulgaria executed 40,000 Greeks during the occupation—more than Germany and Italy combined—including 2–3,000 during the brutal suppression of the Drama uprising in September 1941. About 100,000 Greeks were forced to flee westward and the overall population fell by 217,000 by 1942, despite mass immigration of Bulgarian settlers.

Greeks and Jews were allotted smaller food rations than Bulgarians, which meant that Jews were disproportionately affected by the Greek famine. Hundreds of Thracian Jews were forced into Bulgarian labor battalions and many of these forced to work on the rail line between Sidirokastro and Simitli, which was intended to economically tie the annexed areas into Bulgaria and was later used to carry the Belomorie Jews to their deaths. Some Jews, around 20 percent of the prewar population of 5,490, fled to Salonica in the German occupation zone or farther to the Italian-occupied area.

== Planning ==
Preparations for a possible Allied attack in the northern Aegean coincided with preparations for the deportation of Salonica's Jews and the deployment of German advisor Theodor Dannecker to Bulgaria in late 1942, in order to ensure that Western Thrace was also cleared. According to historian Steven Bowman, Hitler believed that Jewish populations would hamper the Axis defenses in the event of invasion.

In October 1942, all Jews, including those in Belomorie, were registered by the authorities. On 4 February 1943, Alexander Belev of Bulgaria's Commissariat for Jewish Affairs (KEV) outlined plans to deport Jews from Bulgarian-occupied Thrace and Yugoslavia in a report to Interior Minister Petar Gabrovski. Belev wanted the Jews to be arrested immediately on the pretext that they would be relocated elsewhere in Bulgaria and held in camps in Bulgaria until they could be deported. He planned that the KEV would dispose of the Jews' property. Initially there was a plan to build several transit camps in Bulgaria, but after inspections Belev narrowed the sites to Gorna Dzhumaya and Dupnica where he felt local cooperation would be forthcoming. On 22 February, Dannecker and Belev signed an agreement for the deportation of 20,000 Jews from the Bulgarian-occupied territories.

On 2 March 1943, the cabinet issued a series of decrees approving the deportation of Jews from Bulgarian-occupied Greece and ordering various ministries to prepare for and execute it. All the KEV personnel were forbidden to resign or refuse to complete assigned tasks until 31 March. The cabinet agreed that Jews of Bulgarian nationality would be stripped of it as soon as they were deported and that immobile property would be confiscated by the government, while the KEV was empowered to sell mobile property for the benefit of local Bulgarians. These decrees were signed by all ministers present (but not Justice Minister Konstantin Partov, who was absent) and were not published in the government gazette, Durzhaven Vestnik, to maintain secrecy. The KEV was led in Belomorie by Jaroslav Kalicin, who directed the deportation.

== Roundup ==
External videos
- Silent film of the deportation of Jews from Kavala, Serres, and Drama

The operation was executed at 04:00 on 4 March 1943 in all the places in Belomorie with a significant Jewish population—Komotini, Alexandroupoli, Kavala, Drama, Xanthi, and Serres—and came as a surprise to the Jews awakened, some arrested wearing only underwear. From sometime after midnight until around 08:00, the Bulgarian Army sealed off neighborhoods so that the police could conduct arrests based on lists of names and addresses. Jews were told that they would be temporarily removed to Bulgaria and allowed to return soon. They were marched through the main streets of the cities and temporarily detained in tobacco warehouses. Although there were no major disturbances many locals sympathized with the Jews and offered assistance, helping Jews hide their property or offering them food.

The KEV reported that 42 people were arrested in Alexandroupolis, 3 in Samothrace, 589 in Drama, 878 in Komotini, 1,484 in Kavala, 19 in Eleftheroupoli, 16 in Thasos, 526 in Xanthi, 12 in Chrysoupoli, 471 from Serres, and 18 in Ziliahovo. Overall 4,058 of the 4,273 Jews in Western Thrace were arrested during the roundup. The majority of those not deported were citizens of neutral or Axis-allied countries, who were exempt, as well as a few Greek citizens who managed to escape or were in jail or hospitalized at the time. Another 42 Jews from Greece who were in labor battalions were arrested and deported along with the Jews from Vardar Macedonia, while others were not sent to the KEV before the deportations were over, thus escaping death. Belev asked for and obtained declarations of gratitude from local Bulgarian authorities for depriving them of their Jewish population.

== Deportation ==
Places through which Thracian Jews were deported

The Jews were then sent in open railway cars to the camps in Gorna Dzhumaya and Dupnica, guarded by police or soldiers. At Sidirokastro and Simitli they were transferred to different railway cars as the Bulgarian railway had a narrower gauge than the Greek one. The conditions were so harsh that many Jews fell ill and a few died, while pregnant women had to give birth in the open cars. Their misery was exacerbated by mistreatment by the Bulgarian guards. The 1,500 Jews from Komotini and Xanthi arrived at Dupnica from 7 March, while 2,500 Jews from the other locations were sent to Gorna Dzhumaya, arriving between 6 and 10 March.

At Gorna Dzhumaya, Jews had to walk a mile from the train station to the transit camps at the Rainov tobacco warehouse and the School of Economics. There was only one water faucet for 1,000 people and only one toilet per 300–500 detainees. Poor conditions led to 1–3 people dying in the camp each day. At Dupnica, five people died at the camp and were buried in the city's Jewish cemetery. Jewish doctor Marko A. Perets reported that little of some supplies donated by the local Jewish community reached the prisoners as it was appropriated by the guards. The Jews in the camp had to submit to searches during which money was stolen from them. Some Bulgarian residents of Dupnica suggested interning the local Jews in the camp as well as they were blamed for shortages. On 9 March, some Jews with Bulgarian citizenship were released. The rest of the Jews were told that there was a plan to send them to Mandatory Palestine via Black Sea ports.

On 18 and 19 March, the Jews were deported again from Gorna Dzhumaya (the first train) and Gorna Dzhumaya and Dupnica (the second) to the Danube port city of Lom via Sofia by rail. In Sofia a representative of the railway company counted the passengers to determine the fare, charged to the KEV, which was covered using the proceeds of Jewish property sales. At this point there were 4,057 Jews, minus some deaths but with a few additional stragglers as well as births added. Arriving in Lom on 19 and 20 March, Jews were deported again on ships. Kara G'orgi departed at 14:00, 20 March; the second, Voivoda Mashil, left later that day. Saturnus and Tsar Dushan departed in the evening of 21 March. Each ship carried between 875 and 1,100 people, for a total of 4,219 deported (including some from Pirot in Bulgarian-occupied Yugoslavia). Several people died during the journey, which took five to ten days depending on the vessel. In Vienna, they were surrendered to Nazi authorities. The Jews were then deported to Katowice on 26 and 27 March, where the Bulgarian guards returned home. Bulgaria was responsible for the paying the fare as far as Katowice, also charged to the KEV.

The Jews continued by rail to Treblinka extermination camp, where all were immediately killed in the gas chamber. Ninety other Jews from Kavala were deported along with the Jews of Vardar Macedonia from the camp in Skopje to Treblinka on 29 March. Historian Frederick B. Chary estimates that in all, 4,075 Jews from Bulgarian-occupied Greece were deported by Bulgaria. In less than a month 97 percent of the Jews under Bulgarian control were murdered. This death rate was one of the highest in Europe.

== Property ==
After the deportation, the KEV sold the movable property of the deportees for the "Jewish community fund" placed at the disposal of the agency. Property belonging to different people was not registered according to its original owner in order to speed up the process. There were also instances of unofficial looting, especially in Kavala and Komotini. The government bought up much of the property and the rest was often sold off to friends of the liquidators for a fraction of its actual value, often to be resold for personal profit. Those involved in this organized despoliation included policemen, judges, KEV officials, laborers, and civil servants assigned to the liquidation committees.

The total profit to the government was 6,163,978 leva from Komotini, 4,162,272 from Drama, 5,803,380 from Kavala, 2,528,175 from Selres, and 1,978,079 from Ksanti, totaling 20,635,884 leva (around $257,000 in contemporary dollars or $4,800,000 today). After the deportation, Germany demanded that Bulgaria pay 250 Reichsmarks per Jew deported, but Bulgaria refused to pay.

== Aftermath ==
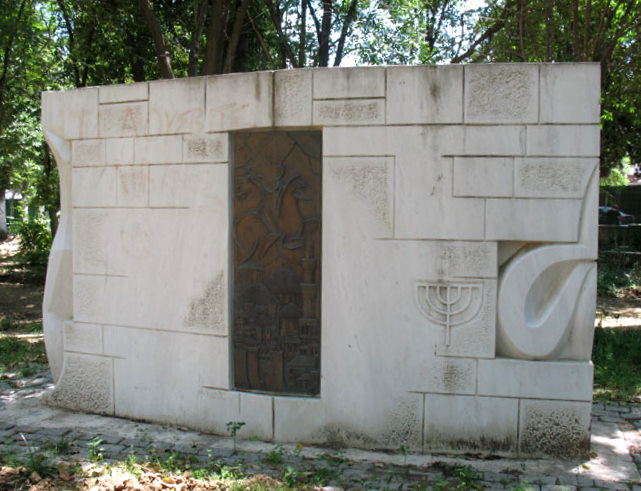
Holocaust memorial in Komotini

On 4 May 1943, the Jews in the German-occupied strip along the Turkish border, who lived in Didymoteicho (740 Jews), Orestiada (197 Jews), and Soufli (32 Jews), were rounded up and deported to Auschwitz concentration camp via Baron Hirsch ghetto in Salonica. Marco Nahon, a Jewish doctor from Didymoteicho, was the author of the first published Holocaust memoir. He and his son were two of the twenty Jews from that town and Orestiada who survived to return after the war.

In 2016, researcher Vassilis Ritzaleos organized a conference at Democritus University of Thrace in Komotini, during which academics from Germany, Israel, Bulgaria and Greece gathered to discuss the Holocaust in Bulgarian-occupied areas of Greece.

== See also ==
- 1934 Thrace pogroms
- Holocaust Museum of Greece
- The Holocaust in Bulgaria
