= Law for Protection of the Nation =

Bulgarian anti-Jewish law (1941–1944)

Law for Protection of the Nation Закон за защита на нацията
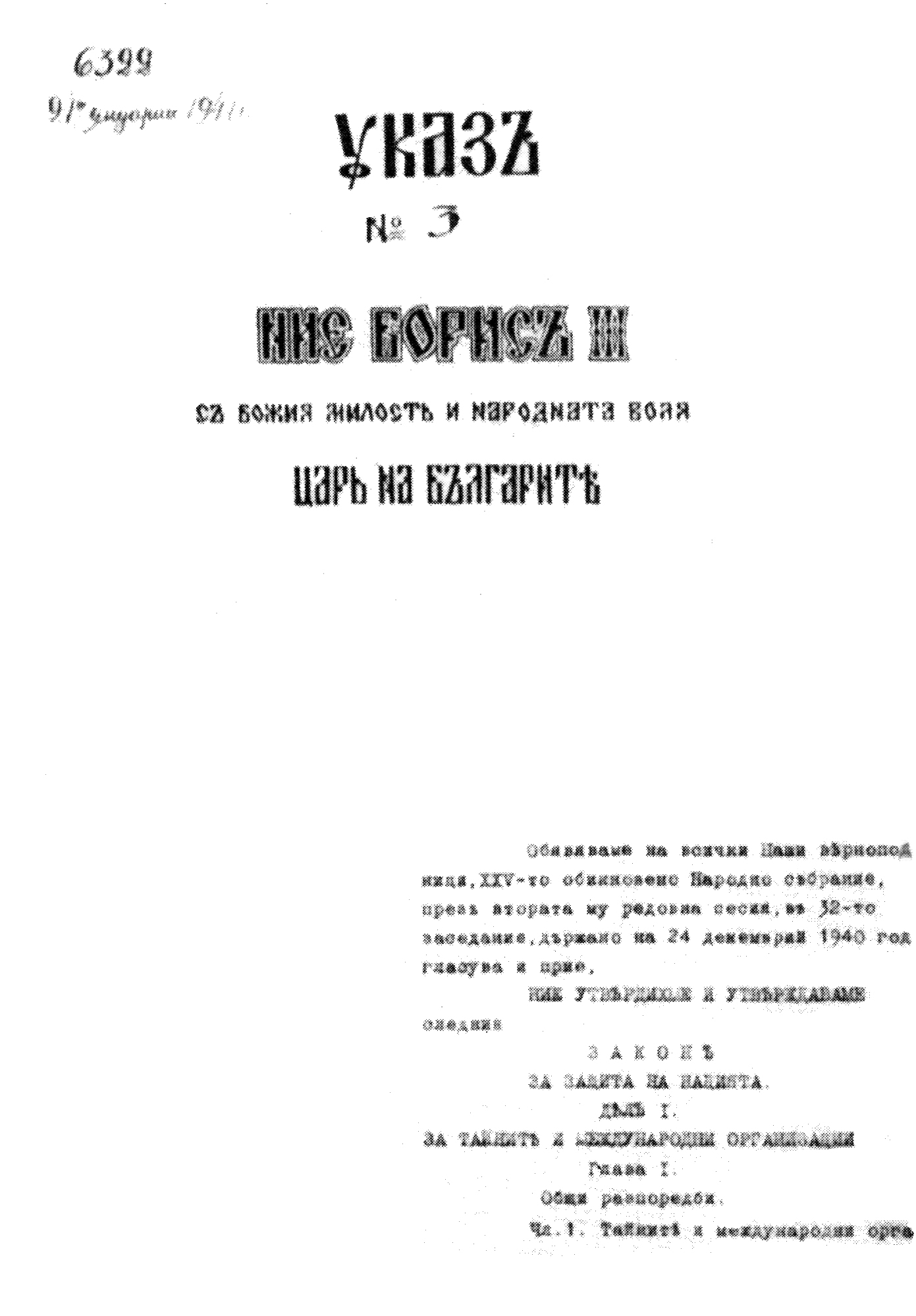
- Decree of Boris III approving the Law for Protection of the Nation

National Assembly
- Citation: D.V., 16, 23.01.1941
- Territorial extent: Kingdom of Bulgaria; Bulgarian Macedonia and occupied Greece (from April 1941)
- Enacted by: National Assembly of Bulgaria
- Assented to: 19 January 1941
- Commenced: 23 January 1941
- Repealed: 27 November 1944

Legislative history
- Introduced by: Petar Gabrovski
- Introduced: October 1940
- First reading: 15 November 1940
- Second reading: 20 November 1940
- Third reading: 24 December 1940
- Voting summary: 115–121 voted for

Summary
- directs measures against Jews and other groups

Keywords
- Antisemitism, anti-Masonry, the Holocaust, history of the Jews in Bulgaria, racial segregation
- Status: Repealed

The Law for Protection of the Nation (Bulgarian: Закон за защита на нацията — ЗЗН) was a Bulgarian law, effective from 23 January 1941 to 27 November 1944, which directed measures against Jews and others whose legal definition it established. The law was an anti-Jewish racial law passed by the parliament of the Kingdom of Bulgaria in December 1940 along the example of the Nuremberg Laws in Nazi Germany. Under it, Jews were to be refused Bulgarian citizenship, in addition to:

- changes in the names of Jews.
- exclusion from public service and politics.
- restrictions on their place of residence.
- prohibitions on economic and professional activity.
- confiscation of property.

After April 1941, the Law's provisions were applied beyond Bulgaria's pre-war borders to territories occupied by the Bulgarian army, as well as claimed and administered by Bulgaria. This culminated in the deaths of most Jews living in these areas in the Holocaust.

== History ==
The bill was proposed to parliament by Petar Gabrovski, Interior Minister and former Ratnik leader in October 1940. His protégé, government lawyer and fellow Ratnik, Alexander Belev, had been sent to study the 1933 Nuremberg Laws in Germany and was closely involved in its drafting. Modelled on this precedent, the law targeted Jews, together with Freemasonry and other intentional organizations deemed "threatening" to Bulgarian national security.

Bulgaria, as a potential beneficiary from the Molotov–Ribbentrop Pact in August 1939, had competed with other such nations to curry favour with Nazi Germany by gestures of antisemitic legislation. Bulgaria was economically dependent on Germany, with 65% Bulgaria's trade in 1939 accounted for by Germany, and militarily bound by an arms deal. Bulgarian extreme nationalists lobbied for a return to the enlarged borders of the 1878 Treaty of San Stefano. On 7 September 1940, Southern Dobruja, lost to Romania under the 1913 Treaty of Bucharest, was returned to Bulgarian control by the Treaty of Craiova, formulated under German pressure. A citizenship law followed on 21 November 1940, which transferred Bulgarian citizenship to the inhabitants of the annexed territory, including to around 500 Jews, alongside the territory's Roma, Greeks, Turks, and Romanians.

Petar Gabrovski and Alexander Belev were aligned to Nazism and were both members of the fascist group "Combatants for the Advancement of the Bulgarian National Spirit" or Ratniks. Also in support of the legislation were the pro-fascist organizations the Union of Bulgarian National Legions, the Union of Bulgarian Youth (Otets Pajsi), the National Union of Bulgarian Students, and Brannik. The unions of pharmacists and shopkeepers were likewise in favour.

The bill made legislative progress through the winter of late 1940, with parliament reviewing the it on the 15, 19, and 20 November. The week before the debates over the bill continued to second reading on 20 December 1940, a ship carrying 326 Bulgarian Jewish and other Jewish refugees heading to British-administered Palestine, the Salvador, was wrecked in the Sea of Marmara on 14 December with 230 lives lost. Of the 160 seats in the National Assembly, a majority of between 115 and 121 members voted with the government. The parliament ratified the bill on Christmas Eve, 1940. It received royal assent from Tsar Boris III on 15 January the following year, being published in the State Gazette on 23 January 1941.

After April 1941, the Law's jurisdiction was extended beyond Bulgaria's pre-war borders to territories in Greece and Yugoslavia occupied by the Bulgarian army, as well as claimed and administered by Bulgaria.

== Content ==
The law forbade the granting of Bulgarian citizenship to Jews as defined by the law. The law's second chapter ordered measures for the definition, identification, segregation, and economic and social marginalization of Jews. The definition of "persons of Jewish origin" (licata ot evrejski proizhod) was of both racial and religious character. Anyone with one or more Jewish parents was considered Jewish. The Law excluded those who "adopted or who are going to adopt Christianity as their first religion" prior to the date of the law's enactment.

The law removed the right of Jews to hold any elected office or position in the civil service.

Jews were forbidden to have names ending in the suffixes typical of Bulgarian patronymic names: -ov, -v, or –ič. This was intended to facilitate the identification of Jews and reverse assimilation.

Jews were to be segregated from non-Jews in various ways. Mixed marriages were banned and Jews were forbidden to employ Bulgarian household staff. Jews could not move residence without police permission, while the Council of Ministers and Interior Ministry were empowered to decide where Jews were to be allowed to live. Jews were required within one month of the Law's taking effect to declare all their real estate and other property to the Bulgarian Central Bank.

The law provided for the introduction of quotas limiting the numbers of Jews allowed in professions and financial limits were imposed on capital defined as Jewish in publishing, banking, the arms trade, credit firms, the pharmaceutical and medical sectors, leisure, and the arts.

Jews converted to Christianity before 1 September 1940 were exempted from classification as Jews, as were those whose had married a person "of Bulgarian descent" before that date and who had subsequently converted before the law's enactment. Baptized children and mixed couples were also excluded and the Nazi concept of Mischling was not reproduced in the law. Likewise, military war orphans and veterans (volunteers, not conscripts) who had been disabled or awarded medals or honours were exempt. Distinctions of this kind were increasingly overlooked later in WWII.

Foreign Jews were forbidden to claim Bulgarian citizenship by naturalization in Bulgaria, a measure that in December 1940 was directed at recently-arrived Central European Jews.

== Opposition ==
Although anti-Jewish measures were seen as supporting the aim of Bulgaria's territorial expansion via closer with alignment to Germany among politicians and the royal court of Tsar Boris, the bill's announcement in October 1940 divided opinion among Bulgarian society and elite. Opponents argued that the bill's text violated equality before the law, that the Jewish minority of Bulgaria posed no "threat to national security" as alleged by its proponents, and that the legislation was in any case immoral, invoking the "national tolerance" of Bulgarians. Objections were instantly raised, and numerous open letters, petitions, and demands for audiences with the Tsar and Prime Minister Bogdan Filov were lodged.

The Central Consistory of Jews in Bulgaria led opposition, alongside senior clerics of the Bulgarian Orthodox Church. Professional organizations, notably the unions of lawyers, doctors, and writers were opposed. The prominent journalist Dimo Kazasov and many other ordinary voters and workers submitted protests.

Political opposition came from the jurist and ex-PM Nikola Mušanov, ex-minister, diplomat and law professor Petko Stajnov, and from Communist members of parliament Ljuben Djugmedžiev and Todor Poljakov. Member of the ruling majority Ivan Petrov lobbied against his government.

Jewish leaders protested against the law, and the Bulgarian Orthodox Church, some professional organizations, and twenty-one writers also opposed it.

== Consequences ==
Citizens of Jewish origin were also banned from certain public areas, restricted economically, and marriages between Jews and Bulgarians were prohibited. Jews were forced to pay a one-time tax of 20 percent of their net worth. The legislation also established quotas that limited the number of Jews in Bulgarian universities.

The Law for the Protection of the Nation stipulated that Jews fulfil their compulsory military service in the Labour Corps instead of the regular armed forces. Mandatory conscription applied from August 1941: initially men 20-44 were drafted, with the age limit rising to 45 in July 1942 and 50 a year later. Jewish soldiers and officers were transferred to the Labour Corps, initially retaining their ranks and privileges. These were soon lost however, as from 1942 it was deemed inappropriate for Jews to serve in the military and they were transferred to civil labour battalions (typically with harsher conditions and fewer privileges than in the military).

The Law was passed under direct influence from Nazi Germany, but did not lead to the deportation of the Bulgarian Jews to Nazi extermination camps, except for the Jews from former Greek and Yugoslavian territories occupied by Bulgaria.

Although Bulgarian citizenship was granted jus soli to residents of newly annexed South Dobruja, the Law for the Protection of the Nation forbade to granting of citizenship to Jews in the subsequently occupied territories, and no action was taken to determine the status of any of the inhabitants at all until 1942. Jews were merely issued with identity cards in a different colour to non-Jews'. A decree-law issued on 10 June 1942 (Nerada za podantstvo v osvobodenite prez 1941 godina zemi) confirmed that the "liberated" territories' Jewish residents were ineligible for Bulgarian citizenship. This effectively made them stateless.

The law introduced restrictions on foreign Jews as well. In late 1938 and early 1939 Bulgarian police officials and the Interior Ministry were already increasingly opposed to the admittance of Jewish refugees from persecution in Central Europe. In response to a query by British diplomats in Sofia, the Foreign Ministry confirmed the policy that from April 1939, Jews from Germany, Romania, Poland, Italy, and what remained of Czechoslovakia (and later Hungary) would be required to obtain consent from the ministry to secure entry, transit, or passage visas. Nevertheless, at least 430 visas (and probably around 1,000) were issued by Bulgarian diplomats to foreign Jews, of which there were as many as 4,000 in Bulgaria in 1941. On 1 April 1941 the Police Directorate allowed the departure of 302 Jewish refugees, mostly underage, from Central Europe for the express purpose of Bulgaria "freeing itself from the foreign element".

From early in the war, Bulgarian occupation authorities in Greece and Yugoslavia handed over Jewish refugees fleeing from Axis Europe to the Gestapo. In October 1941 Bulgarian authorities demanded the registration of 213 Serbian Jews detected by the Gestapo in Bulgarian-administered Skopje; they were arrested on 24 November and 47 of these were taken to Banjica concentration camp in Belgrade, Serbia and killed on 3 December 1941.

The law was followed by a decree-law (naredbi) on 26 August 1942, which tightened restrictions on Jews, widened the definition of Jewishness, and increased the burdens of proof required to prove non-Jewish status and exemptions. Jews were thereafter required to wear yellow stars, excepting only those baptized who practised the Christian eucharist. Bulgarian Jews married to non-Jews by Christian rite before 1 September 1940 and baptized before the 23 January 1941 enforcement of the Law for the Protection of the Nation, rescinding the exemptions allowed to such cases allowed by the law. Exemptions for war orphans, war widows, and the disabled veterans were henceforth applicable only "in the event of competition with other Jews", and all such exemptions could be revoked or denied if the individual were convicted of a crime or deemed "anti-government" or "communist".

== See also ==
- History of the Jews in Bulgaria
- The Holocaust in Bulgaria
- Organization of the Jews in Bulgaria
- Law for the Protection of German Blood and German Honour
- Law for the Protection of Macedonian National Honour
