= Scouting in Bulgaria =

The Scout movement of Bulgaria consists of several associations with slightly different aims. Among them are:

- Organizatsia na Bulgarskite Skauty (OBS), belonging to the World Organization of the Scout Movement, founded in 1995 with 2,711 members
- National Scout Organization of Bulgaria "Saint George" (Национална скаутска организация на България "Свети Георги", NSOB) were in contact with the Union Internationale des Guides et Scouts d'Europe from 2000 to 2005; this association was disbanded and currently it is under the name National Scout Organization of Bulgaria (Национална скаутска организация на България, НСОБ, NSOB)
- Bulgarska Skautska Organizatsiya, belonging to the World Federation of Independent Scouts (WFIS)

== International Scout units in Bulgaria ==
Boy Scout Troop 359 was reactivated in January 2014, chartered under the American English Academy as part of the Transatlantic Council, Mediterranean District of BSA. In addition, there are USA Girl Scouts Overseas in Sofia, serviced by way of USAGSO headquarters in New York City. Girl Scout Junior and Cadette Troops meet weekly at the American English Academy. Cub Scout Pack 3359 is in the process of reactivation under the charter of American English Academy.

== Pioneer movements of the past ==
- During the Communist period in Bulgaria, the pioneer movement Pioneri was the only allowed youth movement.

== See also ==
- Organization of Young Bulgarian Scouts
