= Organization of Young Bulgarian Scouts =

First Bulgarian Scout Organization founded in 1923

Organization of Young Bulgarian Scouts (ОБМР)
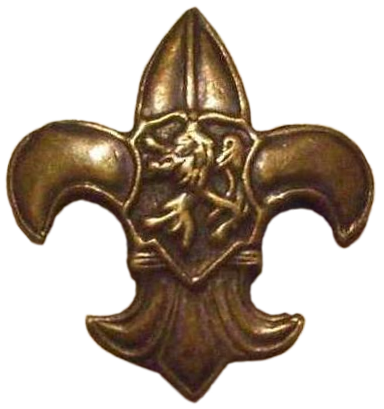
- ОБМР badge
- Country: Bulgaria
- Founded: 1923
- Defunct: 1940
- Founder: Nikola Zhekov
- Membership: 4,040 (1929)

The Organization of Young Bulgarian Scouts (in Bulgarian: Организацията на българските младежи разузнавачи - ОБМР) was a children's and youth organization founded in 1923 inspired by the boy scouts of Robert Baden-Powell, whose objective was physical, moral, civic and patriotic education.

== History ==
=== Origin ===
The first notice of Scouting in Bulgaria started as early as 1911. General Nikola Zhekov, commander of the 1st infantry regiment, received information about the emerging youth movement and remained fascinated by the method of out-of-school boy training. Thus, excited by what he saw, he made the first attempts to implement it around the country. At Zhekov initiative under his direct leadership the first Scout troop was formed in Sofia.

=== War ===
The Balkan War broke out so every step to develop Scouting for the next few years stopped. In 1915, more people in the country became interested like Colonel Y. Velchev, who received mainly on translation materials as well as issued a memorandum of the earlier Scouts who responded to many of the questions he was looking for. The country fell in a deep crisis due to its participation in World War I, so it was imperative an attempt to motivate new generations build a Scout organization. The years of World War I and the following ones were severe, Bulgaria suffered a deep crisis affecting statehood and society. A large percentage of children were involved in production to help feed their families, malnutrition and dead dramatically increased among young people. Child crime was also a big issue. In order to improve the situation of the young generations, a number of youth movements and organizations were emerging like Red Cross, various religious, cultural organizations and Scouting too.

=== Foreign organization of Scouting in Bulgaria ===
Under the influence of White Russian emigrants and their experience with the Russian Scout organization, the first Scout units in Bulgaria were established. The Scout's seed had finally been sown. In 1921 under the leadership of an English Scoutmaster, Mr. Michael Wells, an Englishman of Russian service, the first troop of Scouts was founded in Varna. It includes Russian emigrants children mostly, the chief executive of the troop was the Russian emigration general Smedrov.

On September 28, 1922, a troop was founded in the American Boys High School in Samokov under the leadership of Pavel Roland, Scoutmaster and director of the high school, and teacher Iliya Mutafchiev. The troop had 30 boys, divided into three patrols - "Leo", "Wolf" and "Flying Eagle". The Scout idea quickly spread across the country. In the same year, the Russian emigrant Scouts founded its own troop in Sofia.

=== Bulgarian involvement, expansion ===
Gradually, Bulgarians are also included. Under the patronage of the reserve Colonel Petar Trayanov the Bulgarian boys, members of the Sofia Russian Scout Troop, separated into their own troop. The first Bulgarian Scoutmasters to develop Bulgarian Scouting aims were Dimitar Dimitrov and Stefan Yanchulev. From these first sprouts in Varna, Sofia and Samokov, the Organization of Bulgarian Young Scouts (Организацията на българските младежи разузнавачи - ОБМР) was founded in 1923.

In the second half of 1924, ОБМР was recognized and admitted as a member of the World Bureau of Boy Scouts, based in London. In 1925, a camp-school of the organization was opened near the town of Vladaya, Sofia. Scoutmasters, Wolf Cub Leaders, and Patrol Leaders were trained there. The training program included theoretical, practical and administration skills. The first director of the school was Stefan Yanchulev, he was the first director of the training school, who completed the courses for Wolf Cub leaders in France (the "Chamarande" school).

Dated May 1928 the world census reflected 219 instructors, 69 rovers, 1598 scouts, 36 sea scouts and 336 wolf cubs. Adding a total of 2258 members. In 1929 the Boy Scout movement in Bulgaria had in this short period made rapid progress. There were 180 troops in Sofia and the larger towns in the Provinces, with 4040 registered members. The Bulgarian army viewed with great interest the creation and consolidation of Scout troops and actively participated in the management and organization of its divisions.

=== Decline and dissolution ===
Since 1932 there was a totalitarian drift and the Scout Movement suffered the attacks of power to force a merger into a single state youth organization on several occasions, without success. In 1940, with a brief letter to the International Scout Office in London, the leaders of the ОБМР reported on their self-dissolution, forced by the Ministry of War, General Hristo Lukov, and his assistant Colonel Svetoslav Akrabov. Officially Bulgarian Scouting was disbanded. Since then, the ОБМР began its transformation towards a militarized state youth organization. On December 29, the 25th National Assembly passed a law on the organization of Bulgarian youth in a state organization that would later become "Brannik", initiative of the then prime minister Bogdan Filov. Since Bulgaria was not a German-occupied country, the dissolution did not affect the Russian Scout troops, which continued to function normally to a certain extent until the end of the war.

John S. Wilson, director of the International Office, tried unsuccessfully to bring positions in Bulgaria, Romania and Yugoslavia closer together to maintain links between the International Scout Office with the new organizations reconverted into unique youth movements, to work for a common cause, facilitate exchanges, train courses in Gilwell Park or participate in international conferences as observers. It was unsuccessful due to subsequent events that prevented compliance with the signed agreements.

Scouting was outlawed after the war as well, when communists controlled Bulgaria. Scout resources during the communist period were confiscated and redistributed to the Pioneri and the chavdari of the Dimitrovist Pioneer Organization "Septemberists" for communist youth.
