= Petar Gabrovski =

Bulgarian politician (1898–1945)

- Петър Габровски
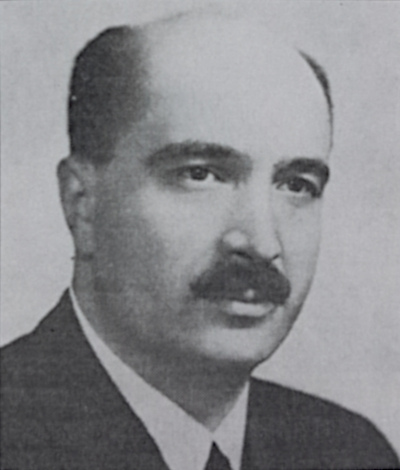

Prime Minister of Bulgaria
- In office Acting: 9–14 September 1943
- Monarch: Simeon II
- Preceded by: Bogdan Filov
- Succeeded by: Dobri Bozhilov

Personal details
- Born: Petar Dimitrov Gabrovski; 9 July 1898 Razgrad, Principality of Bulgaria
- Died: 1 February 1945 (aged 46) Sofia, Kingdom of Bulgaria
- Party: Ratniks of the Advancement of the Bulgarian National Spirit (1936–1944)
- Occupation: Lawyer

Petar Dimitrov Gabrovski (Bulgarian: Петър Димитров Габровски) (9 July 1898 – 1 February 1945) was a Bulgarian politician who briefly served as Prime Minister during the Second World War. Gabrovski was a lawyer by profession. He was also a member of the Grand Masonic Lodge of Bulgaria.

== Early years ==
Gabrovski began his political career as a Nazi, forming his own movement the Ratniks of the Advancement of the Bulgarian National Spirit (Ratnitsi Napreduka na Bulgarshtinata) - more commonly known as Ratnik or the Ratnitsi. The group was virulently Anti-Semitic and was said to have links to Nazi Germany, although it failed to achieve anything approaching a mass following. In 1939 a law banning members of the group from government office was passed although it was not observed for long.

== Minister of the Interior ==
Gabrovski's political career took off in October 1939 when he was brought into the cabinet of Georgi Kyoseivanov as minister responsible for the railways, with his appointment to the cabinet seeing him resigning from the Ratnitsi. In the cabinet established by Bogdan Filov in 1940 he was promoted to the post of Minister of the Interior. The appointment had been made by King Boris III as an attempt to demonstrate to the Nazis that Bulgaria was largely favourable towards them. In this role Gabrovski was quick to enact laws limiting the role of Jews in Bulgarian life and expelled several hundred recently arrived Jews, who had hoped to gain entry into Mandatory Palestine from Bulgaria, forcing them to go to Turkey instead. His bill, the Law for the Defence of the Nation, was modelled on similar legislation in Nazi Germany.

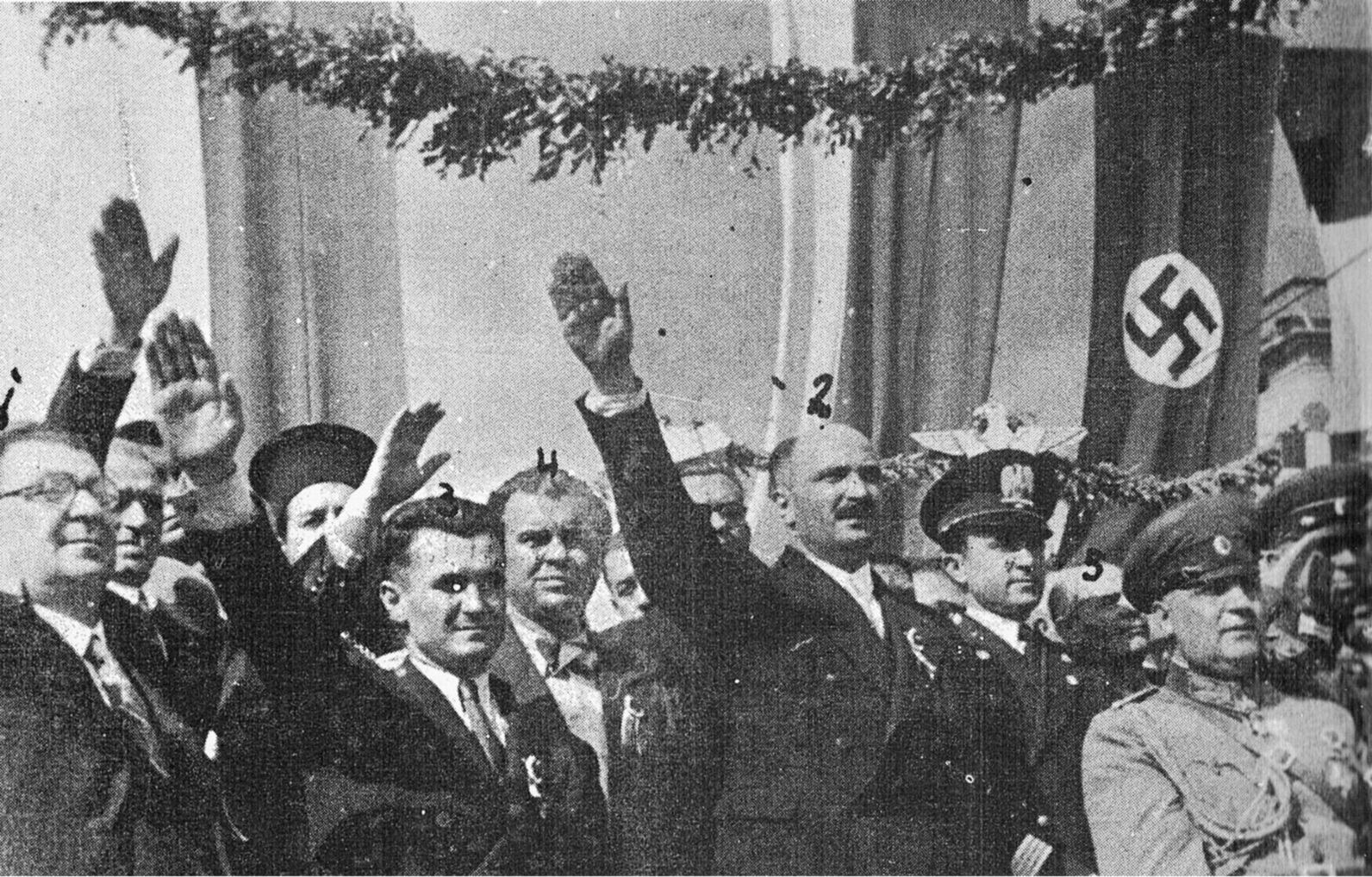
Petar Gabrovski in Skopje

Gabrovski also sent Alexander Belev, a fellow lawyer and Ratnik whom he appointed to a post in the ministry, to Nazi Germany to make a study of their racial laws. He subsequently became associated with the deportation of Jews to extermination camps and most notoriously signed a written agreement to approve the deportation of 11,343 Jews from Macedonia and Thrace on 22 February 1943. As 12,00 of these Tracian and Macedonian Jews had been denied Bulgarian citizenship because of Bulgarian anti-Jewish legislation following the Nazi and Bulgarian occupation of Thrace and Macedonia, Gabrovski told German ambassador Adolf Beckerle that their deportation to Treblinka would be a much simpler matter than any similar attempts against those Jews with citizenship. The plan, as developed by Gabrovski and Belev under the authoritarian, pro-fascist leadership of King Boris III, was partially completed, with 11,363 Tracian and Macedonian Jews deported to Treblinka extermination camp. All but 12 of those deported were exterminated there. As news spread about the deportation, Bulgarian Jews lead an intensive campaign to stop the second scheduled deportation of the 48,000 Bulgarian Jews to Treblinka that King Boris had originally agreed to. The campaign succeeded in forcing King Boris to delay the deportation agreement with Germany. King Boris never cancelled the agreement, which was only the "first" deportation planned.

== Fall from power ==
Following the death of Boris III Gabrovski served as acting Prime Minister between 9 September and 14 September 1943, whilst the country's main political leaders served as regents for Simeon II. He was overlooked for the job full-time however and his position waned from there on as he was seen as too strong a rival for power.

== Execution ==
Following the establishment of Fatherland Front government Gabrovski was arrested and brought before the People's Court where a sentence of death was passed. He was executed on 1 February 1945. In a move widely condemned by Jewish groups Gabrovski was rehabilitated by the Bulgarian Supreme Court in 1996, with the stated reason being that his initial trial contained several irregularities.

Political offices
Preceded by Bogdan Filov	Prime Minister of Bulgaria; 1943	Succeeded by Dobri Bozhilov
