= Stefan I of Bulgaria =

Bulgarian priest (1878–1957)

His Holiness Stefan I
- Bulgarian Exarch and Metropolitan of Sofia
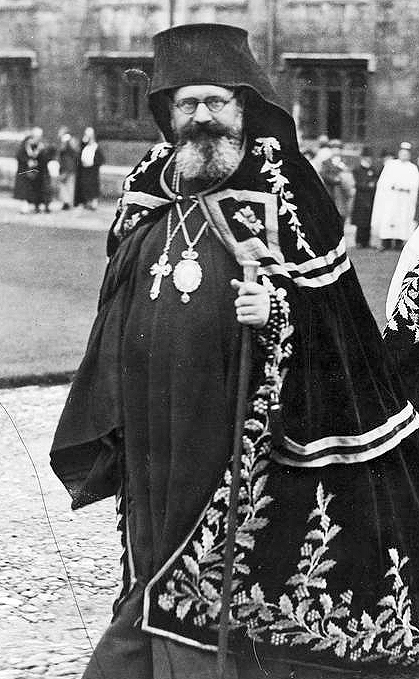
- Church: Bulgarian Orthodox Church (Bulgarian Exarchate)
- See: Sofia
- Installed: 21 January 1945
- Term ended: 6 September 1948
- Predecessor: Neophyte of Vidin
- Successor: Mihail of Dorostol

Personal details
- Born: Stoyan Popgeorgiev Shokov; 19 September 1878 Shiroka Laka, Ottoman Empire
- Died: 12 May 1957 (aged 78) Banya, Bulgaria
- Buried: Bachkovo Monastery
- Denomination: Eastern Orthodox Church
- Residence: Sofia, Bulgaria

Stefan I was a Bulgarian prelate. He was elected Metropolitan of Sofia in 1922 and, from 1945, also served as Exarch of the Bulgarian Orthodox Church. He actively contributed to the rescue of the Bulgarian Jews in World War II. He was awarded the Order of the White Eagle and other decorations.

== Biography ==
=== Early Years ===
Stefan was born on September 7 (new style 19 September) 1878 with the secular name Stoyan Popgeorgiev Shokov in the village of Shiroka Laka, Kaaza Ahi Celebi. He received primary and primary education in his birthplace (1886 – 1892), and continued his III grade in the village of Orehovo (1892 – 1893). He graduated from the School for Reserve Officers in the village of Knyazhevo, then from the Theological Seminary (1893 – 1896) in Samokov as an excellent student and leader of the class. In the period 1896 – 1900 he worked as a teacher in the village of Solishta, near Shiroka Laka. He is a member of the revolutionary committee organized by Valcho Sarafov in Shiroka Laka.

He studied at the Kiev Theological Academy (1900 – 1904), which he graduated with the degree of "candidate of theology". From 1904 to 1907 he worked as a teacher at the Plovdiv Boys' High School, and from 1907 to 1910 he taught at the Constantinople Theological Seminary. On October 16 (new style 29), 1910, he was tonsured into a monastic order with the name Stefan, and three days later, on October 19 (new style 22), 1910, he became protosyngel of the Bulgarian Exarchate in Constantinople. On September 8 (21) 1911, Hieromonk Stefan was elevated to the rank of archimandrite. He supported the Christianization of the Pomaks in the lands newly annexed to Bulgaria after the Balkan Wars.

In the late autumn of 1913, Archimandrite Stephen, together with Exarch Joseph I, returned to Bulgaria and settled in Sofia, where the seat of the Exarchate was already located.

From 1915 to 1919 he specialized in theology in Geneva and defended his doctorate at the University of Fribourg, Switzerland.

=== Metropolitan of Sofia ===
In 1921 he was ordained Bishop of Markiannople, and in 1922 he was elected Metropolitan of Sofia. In his capacity as Metropolitan of Sofia, he served the prayer for the deceased in the church of Sveta Nedelya on April 16, 1925, when an assassination was carried out there.

He served in this position for 26 years. Between the two world wars, he actively participated in the ecumenical movement and represented the Bulgarian Orthodox Church at numerous international conferences. He worked to remove the schism imposed in 1872 on the Bulgarian Exarchate. Thanks to his active work and personal authority, he managed to get Nansen's assistance. He became the godfather of the Shiroko Lak community center "Prosveta", opened in 1934, which today bears his name again.

In the mid-1930s, Metropolitan Stefan was an active supporter of rapprochement with Yugoslavia and in a letter to the recently removed Prime Minister Kimon Georgiev in January 1935 wrote that this position put his life in danger. In 1943 he actively participated in the movement for the salvation of Bulgarian Jews. From 1944 to 1945 he was vice-president of the Holy Synod.

According to the political scientist Anton Todorov (referring to the fourth volume (pp. 507-509) of the book "History of Russian Foreign Intelligence", edited by Soviet and Russian scientist, diplomat and politician Yevgeny Primakov), Metropolitan Stefan was recruited in 1942-43 by the NKVD resident and counselor at the Soviet embassy in Bulgaria - Dmitry Fedichkin (agent Yakovlev), and began to transmit valuable information while a member of the entourage of the royal court.

=== Exarch of Bulgaria ===
On January 21, 1945, he was elected Bulgarian Exarch, and on February 22 of the same year the schism of the Bulgarian Orthodox Church was lifted. As an exarch, he opposed the participation of priests in the political life of the country. Due to his open disagreement with the policy of the communist authorities in the People's Republic of Bulgaria towards the Bulgarian Orthodox Church and its attitude towards religion, on September 6, 1948, he was forced to resign as Bulgarian Exarch.

On November 24, 1948, he was interned in the village of Banya, Karlovo region. In the following years, he was constantly ill. The Holy Synod provided him with some assistance, but refused to allow him to return to Sofia, stating in June 1952 that he "continues to be illegally considered Metropolitan of Sofia and Exarch of Bulgaria", which would cause "a number of disturbances" in the diocese.

Exarch Stefan died in Banya in 1957 and was buried in the main church of the Assumption of the Virgin Mary of the Bachkovo Monastery.

His heirs are Lyuben Nikolaev (sculptor), his son Volen Nikolaev (1954 – 2011, poet and writer) and, as the last heir, Volen Nikolaev's daughter - Bella Volen - an artist, born in 1982 and living in Vienna, Austria.

== Memory ==
Exarch Stefan is the author of numerous speeches and theological works, including "On the Road to Damascus" (1932), "The Bulgarian Church" (1932), "The Essence of Pastoral Ministry" (1935), "Religion and Science" (1937).

Interest in the life and work of Exarch Stefan I began to increase in the 1990s. The first publications about his personality appeared in the press, and later in serious scientific research. In 1998, the 120th anniversary of his birth was celebrated. The name of Exarch Stephen I made a splash in connection with the celebrations on the occasion of the rescue of the Bulgarian Jews during the Second World War. At its session held on November 19, 2001, the Israeli Memorial Institute "Yad Vashem" awarded him with an honorary diploma, a medal and the title of "Righteous among the Nations" for his contribution to the salvation of Bulgarian Jews in 1943.

In 2003, a bust of him was unveiled in his birthplace of Shiroka Laka. The celebrations on this occasion were attended by the former Israeli ambassador to Bulgaria Emanuel Zisman, as well as the then ambassador Avram Sharon, together with 43 of their compatriots from Israel. Avram Sharon appreciates the merits of Exarch Stefan with the words: "For the Bulgarian Jews and for the people of Israel, Exarch Stefan is a symbol of salvation, an emanation of Bulgarian tolerance. The people of Israel and Jews all over the world will never forget this and will always be deeply grateful to their saviors." The life and merits of Exarch Stephen I give reason to Emanuel Zisman in his heartfelt speech to declare: "If humanism were a criterion, Bulgaria should have accepted Europe, not the other way around."
