= Brannik =

Bulgarian pro-fascist youth organization during World War II

Brannik emblem

Brannik (Bulgarian: Бранник; Defenders - English translation) was a Bulgarian pro-fascist youth organization during World War II. The "Brannik" organization was founded on the initiative of the then prime minister prof. Bogdan Filov at the XXV National Youth Meeting on December 29, 1940. It was modeled on the Nazi Hitler Youth. Her motto was: "Boris, Bulgaria, God!" (Bulgarian: „Борис, България, Бог!“) The armbands worn on uniforms and on the banners had the letter "B" on them. The organization was closely related with the Bulgarian authorities and Tsar Boris III personally.

Organizationally, it was divided into 3 structures: for children from 10 to 14 years, for the younger part of the youth from 14 to 16 years and for older youths from 16 to 21 years. The youth were concentrated in teams (boys) and wreaths (girls), and above were the chetas (40-50 people). From April 1941, i.e. the occupation of parts of the territory of Yugoslavia by the Bulgarian army, it also included representatives of occupied Vardar Macedonia. In 1942, members of the Bulgarian Red Cross joined the "Brannik". The organization became mass, reaching a population of approx. 450 thousand. members. On September 9, 1944, after Bulgaria switched to the Allied side, specifically the Soviet one, "Brannik" was outlawed as a fascist organization. Many members were sentenced or repressed in the post-war years by Communist authorities.

== Anthem ==
Ний Бранници сме щедро надарени,

с мощни и стоманени гърди.

Българийо за тебе сме родени,

Съдба велика Бог ни отреди.

С младежки жар обичаме народа,

сплотени сме край българския Цар.

На свободата свята и свещена днес

Бранникът е най-добър пазач. (х2)

English translation:

We, the Brannik, are generously gifted,

with powerful and steel chests.

Bulgaria, we were born for you,

Great destiny God has ordained for us.

With youthful zeal we love the people,

we are united by the Bulgarian Tzar.

Holy and sacred freedom today

The defender is the best guard. (x2)

== Ideology ==
The organization was a typical authoritarian entity, the creation of which was entirely the work of the government. It reported directly to the Prime Minister. It was characterized by pre-barracks physical and ideological training, including wearing uniforms and military training. He propagandized against communism, democracy, liberalism and Western plutocratic regimes.
