= Frederick B. Chary =

American historian

Frederick B. Chary (August 18, 1939 – November 14, 2020) was an American historian, emeritus professor of history at Indiana University Northwest, College of Arts and Sciences. He was past president and sponsor of the North American Bulgarian Studies Association.

== Education ==
Chary earned an A.B. at University of Pennsylvania in 1962, and an M.A. and Ph.D. at University of Pittsburgh in 1963 and 1968, respectively. He was a Fulbright Scholar.

== Career ==
Chary had been at the faculty of Indiana University Northwest since 1967.

Chary served as guest lecturer at the U.S. State Department's Foreign Service Institute.

He was the author of numerous published articles on the history of Bulgaria and the Bulgarian Jews. His book "The Bulgarian Jews and the Final Solution" was published in 1972. It earned a very positive echo in Bulgaria and in Jewish circles. The book described the methods of the country's leadership and public to save the Bulgarian Jews from deportation to German death camps, the only case where the entire Jewish community of a German ally survived during the Second World War.

Chary traveled for his research Germany, Great Britain, Poland and the former Soviet Union. He visited also Israel for studies on the Holocaust. In Bulgaria, he spent several months for studies in history archives and libraries. For his merits on Bulgarian and Jewish studies he was decorated by the Bulgarian National Assembly.

== Death ==
Chary was in physical therapy when he contracted COVID-19, amidst the COVID-19 pandemic in Indiana. He died from complications of COVID-19 in November 2020, at the age of 81.

== Selected publications ==
- The Bulgarian Jews and the Final Solution 1940–1944. University of Pittsburgh Press. 1972. ISBN 0-8229-3251-2.
- The History of Bulgaria. Greenwood Histories of the Modern Nations, 2011, ISBN 978-0-313-38446-2
- CHUTZPAH AND NAÏVETÉ: AN AMERICAN GRADUATE STUDENT BURSTS THROUGH THE IRON CURTAIN TO DO RESEARCH IN BULGARIA. Xlibris. 2014. ISBN 978-1-4990-4440-9 – via Google Books.
