= Aleksandar Belev =

Bulgarian politician (1898–1944)

Aleksandar Georgiev Belev (Bulgarian: Александър Георгиев Белев; 1898, in Lom, Bulgaria – 9 September 1944, in Bulgaria) was the Bulgarian commissar of Jewish Affairs during World War II, famous for his antisemitic and strongly nationalistic views. He played a central role in the deportation of some 12,000 Jews to Nazi concentration camps in occupied Poland. He was also one of the founders of the Bulgarian nationalist Ratniks.

== Early years ==
Belev was born in 1898. His mother was an Italian from Dalmatia named Melanese, and Belev was often dogged by unsubstantiated rumours that her father was Jewish. His father was in fact the revolutionary from SMAC Georgi Belev.

Belev studied law at Sofia University and in Germany before returning to Bulgaria to work as a lawyer. He spent a number of years working within the Ministry of the Interior. The protégé of Interior Minister Petar Gabrovski, a strong supporter of fascism, Belev was sent to Nazi Germany in 1941 on Gabrovski's initiative in order to study the Nuremberg laws with a view to introducing a similar system for Bulgaria. Belev was already notorious as one of the country's most outspoken anti-Semitic politicians.

== Commissariat of Jewish Affairs ==
In February 1942, the Commissariat of Jewish Affairs was established as a department within the Interior Ministry. Gabrovski appointed Belev to serve as the new body's first chairman. He promulgated a new set of laws in August 1942 governing the treatment of Bulgaria's Jews. Based on the Nuremberg Laws, Belev's decrees instituted the wearing of identification stars, corralling into ghettoes and strong restrictions on the movement of Jews.

During this time Belev was a close associate and political ally of SS-Hauptsturmfuhrer Theodor Dannecker, chief of the Gestapo in Bulgaria and deputy to Adolf Eichmann.

Belev's role had officially been to resettle Bulgaria's Jewish population but in June 1942 he reported that such a solution would be impossible during wartime, unless the Bulgarian government was prepared to turn the task over to the Germans. As such on 22 February 1943 he signed a pact with Dannecker to deliver 20,000 Jews to Eichmann, with 12,000 coming from the newly annexed territories of Western Thrace and east Macedonia and the rest from Bulgaria, although ultimately the deportation of the 8,000 citizen Jews was blocked. Those transported ended up in concentration camps with the vast majority not surviving the war

Enthusiasm for the deportation of the Bulgarian Jews was very limited within the political establishment and indeed news of the plan was leaked to the public, who were encouraged to publicly protest. By the time the protests started however, the Thracian and Macedonian Jews had already left. It has been argued that the fact that those deported first were not Bulgarian citizens meant there was less public outrage over their deportation, thus protests were not forthcoming in their case.

The protests helped to ensure that nineteen Bulgarians were later awarded the status of Righteous Among the Nations. Belev was ultimately forced to abandon the plans altogether when ordered to in a telephone conversation with King Boris III.

In an attempt to deal with the Bulgarian Jews he forcibly moved Sofia's 19,000 Jews to smaller towns and villages across the country in May 1943, although these dispossessed Jews largely survived the war.

== Last years and death ==
In October 1943 the newly appointed government of Prime Minister Dobri Bozhilov dismissed Belev from his position as chairman of the Commissariat of Jewish Affairs, replacing him with the more moderate Christo Stomanyakov.

Belev was subsequently reassigned to the Interior Ministry's Central Directorate of Control. Estranged from Gabrovski, whom Belev felt had done too little to protect him from the political machinations that resulted in his fall from power, and having become convinced that a German defeat was inevitable, Belev became embittered and told his reputed lover and former secretary Liliana Panitza he intended to flee to Germany and disappear underground.

Belev disappeared on 9 September 1944, with a rumour having gone round Sofia that he had committed suicide in a bank in Sofia. This however proved to be untrue. Other rumours circulated that he had fled to Germany or even the United States and so widely was it believed that he was still alive that the People's Court tried, convicted and sentenced him to death in absentia. Belev had fled to Kyustendil, from whence he intended to travel to Germany, but when he arrived he was captured by partisans who arrested him and sent him back to Sofia. For the journey Belev was accompanied by an armed guard, a Jewish partisan, who, as soon as they left Kyustendil, turned his gun on Belev and killed him. His body was dumped in a ditch by the roadside, with the incident not reported until several years later.
