= Bulgarian Jews in Israel =

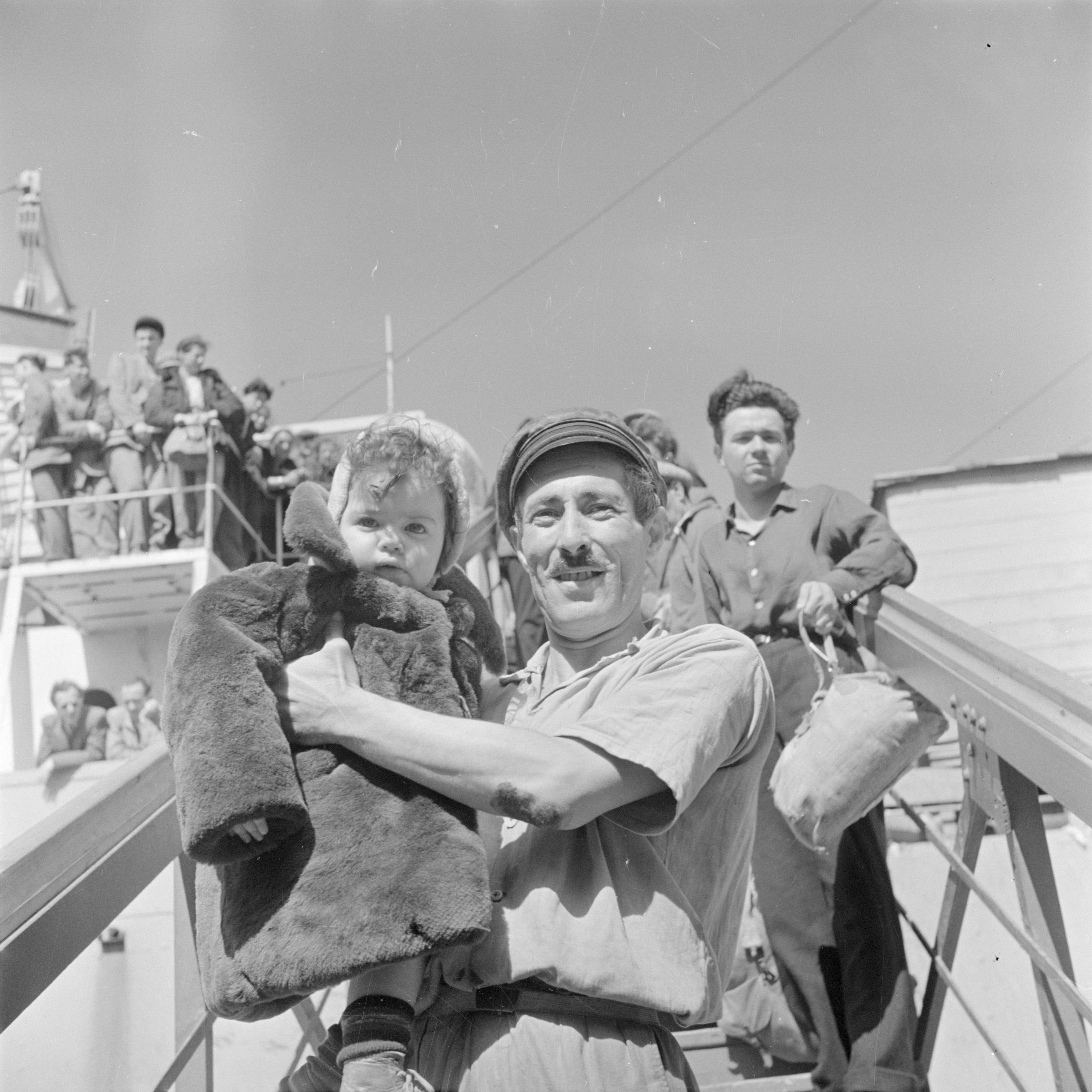

Total population
- 75,000 (Bulgarian citizens)

Regions with significant populations
- Jerusalem and Tel Aviv

Languages
- Hebrew (Main language for all generations); Older generation: Ladino, Bulgarian

Religion
- Judaism

Bulgarian Jews in Israel are Jewish immigrants and descendants of the immigrants of the Bulgarian Jewish communities, who now reside within the state of Israel. They number around 75,000 in the wider definition, and 7,500 in the narrower scope (those with Bulgarian citizenship).

== History ==
After the establishment of the state of Israel, most of the Bulgarian Jewish population left for Israel, leaving only about a thousand Bulgarian Jews living in Bulgaria today (1,162 according to the 2011 census). According to Israeli government statistics, 43,961 people from Bulgaria emigrated to Israel between 1948 and 2006, making Bulgarian Jews in Israel the fourth largest group to come from a European country, after the Soviet Union, Romania and Poland. The current population estimates are 48,900 Jews born or with a father born in Bulgaria or Greece. 32,000 Jews with a Bulgarian- or Greek-born father. 17,000 Bulgarian- and Greek-born Jews.

== Notable people ==
- Binyamin Arditi
- Gabi Ashkenazi
- Menachem Ashkenazi
- Michael Bar-Zohar
- Shimon Bejarano
- Albert Cohen
- Ya'akov Eilon
- Levana Finkelstein
- Moshe Gueron
- Avner Hizkiyahu
- Shlomo Kalo
- Rafael Moshe Kamhi
- Oshrat Kotler
- Shabtai Konorti
- Shmuel Levi
- Yehuda Levi
- Emanuel Levy
- Raphael Mechoulam
- Moni Moshonov
- Aryeh Moskona
- Ya'akov Nehoshtan
- Ya'akov Nitzani
- Avraham Ofek
- Israel Pincas
- David Primo
- Albert Salomon
- Shulamit Shamir
- Victor Shem-Tov
- Rachamim Talbi
- Rami Yosifov
- Daniel Zion
- Emanuel Zisman
- Boris Gelfand

== See also ==
- Aliyah
- History of the Jews in Bulgaria
- Jewish ethnic divisions
- Bulgaria–Israel relations
