= History of the Jews in Bulgaria =

Bulgarian Jews יהודות בולגריה Български Евреи
- The location of Bulgaria (dark green) in the European Union (green).

Regions with significant populations
- Bulgaria: 1,153 (2021 census) (OJB estimates 6,000 citizens have Jewish ancestry)
- Israel: 75,000

Languages
- Hebrew, Bulgarian, Ladino

Religion
- Judaism

Related ethnic groups
- Sephardic Jews, Ashkenazi Jews, Russian Jews, Polish Jews

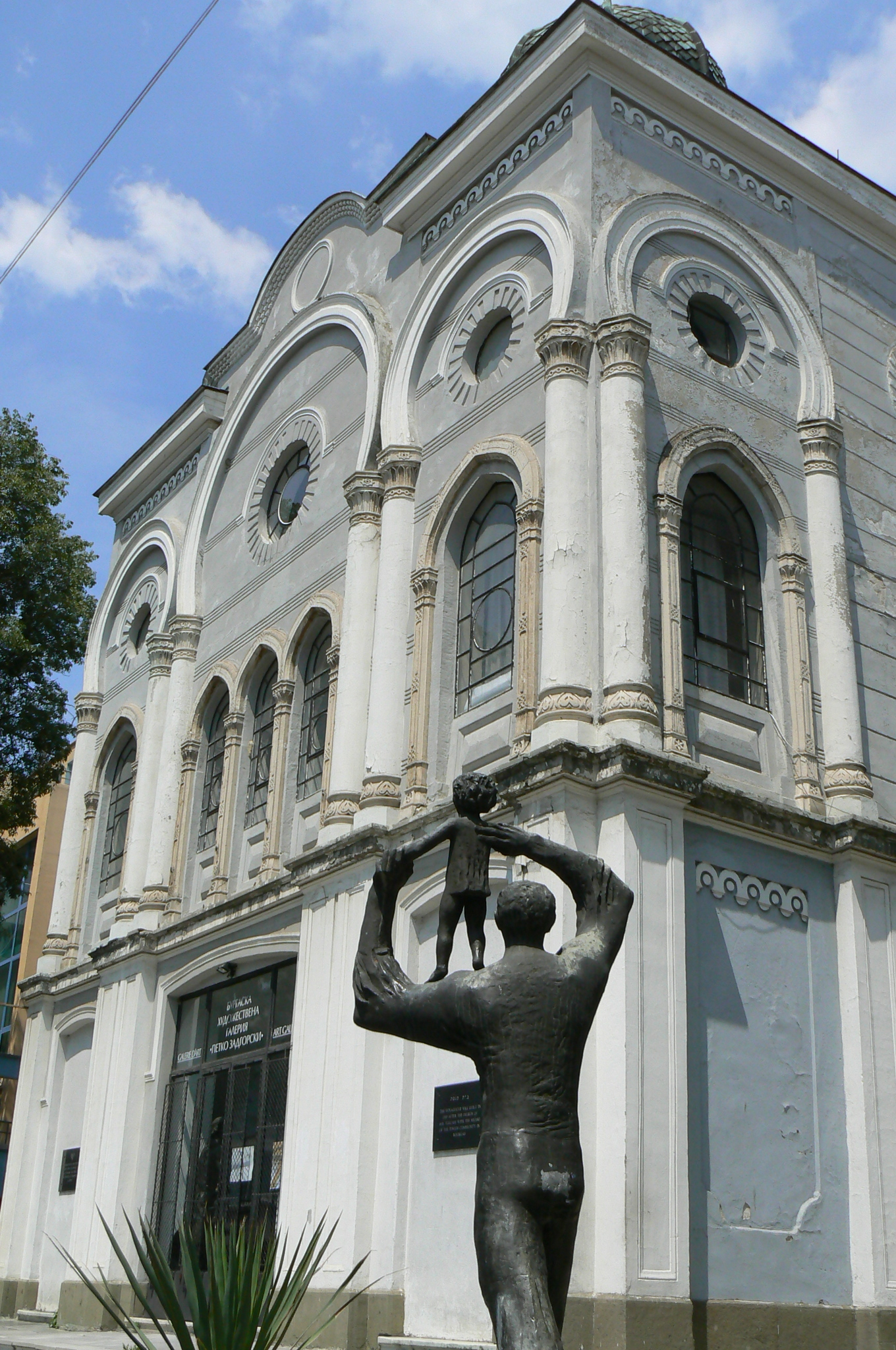
Burgas Synagogue (now an art gallery)

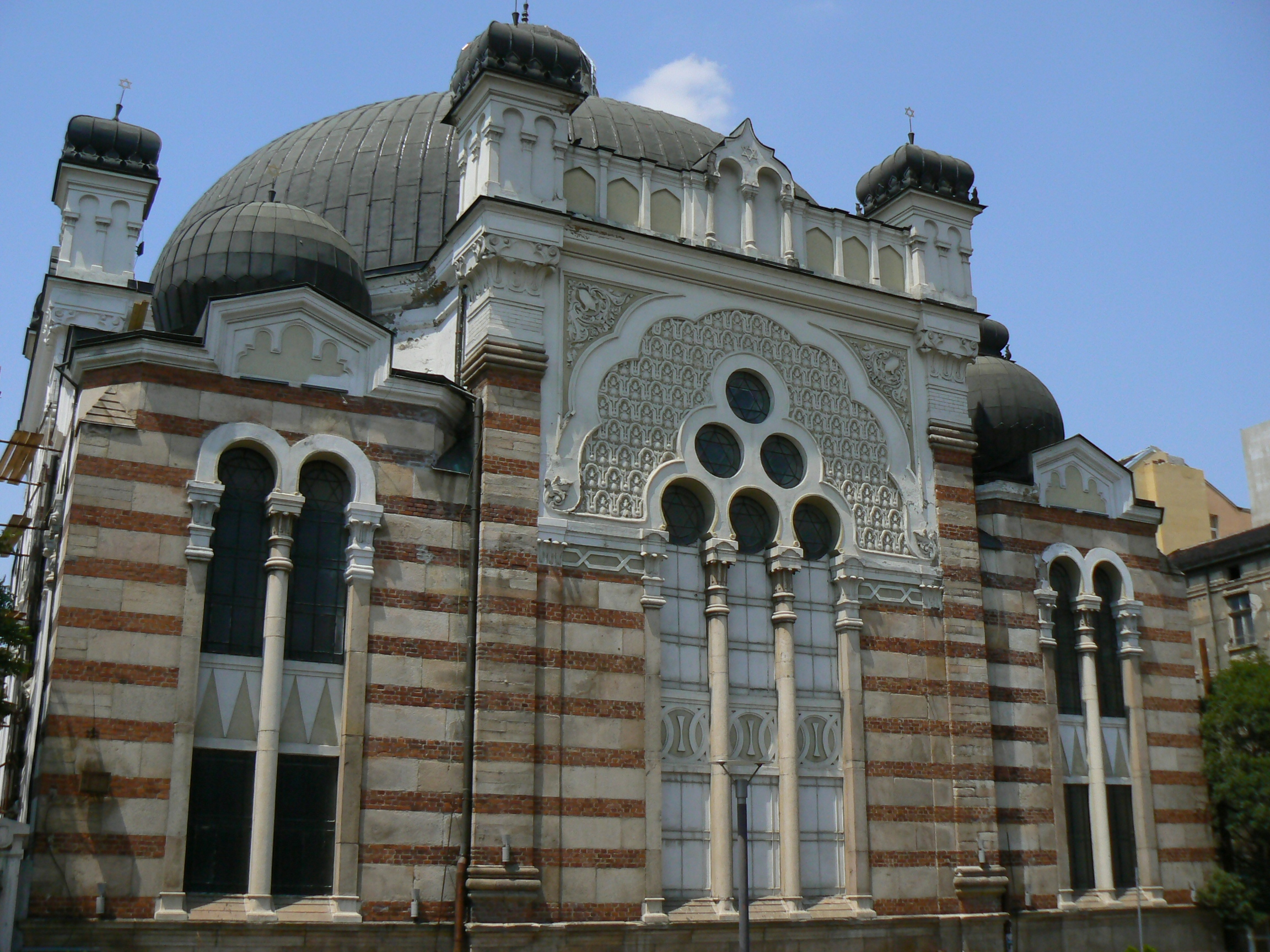
Sofia Synagogue designed by Austrian architect Friedrich Grünanger, established in 1909

The history of the Jews in Bulgaria goes back almost 2,000 years. Jews have had a continuous presence in historic Bulgarian lands since before the 2nd century CE, and have often played an important part in the history of Bulgaria.

Today, the majority of Bulgarian Jews live in Israel, while modern-day Bulgaria continues to host a modest Jewish population.

== Roman era ==
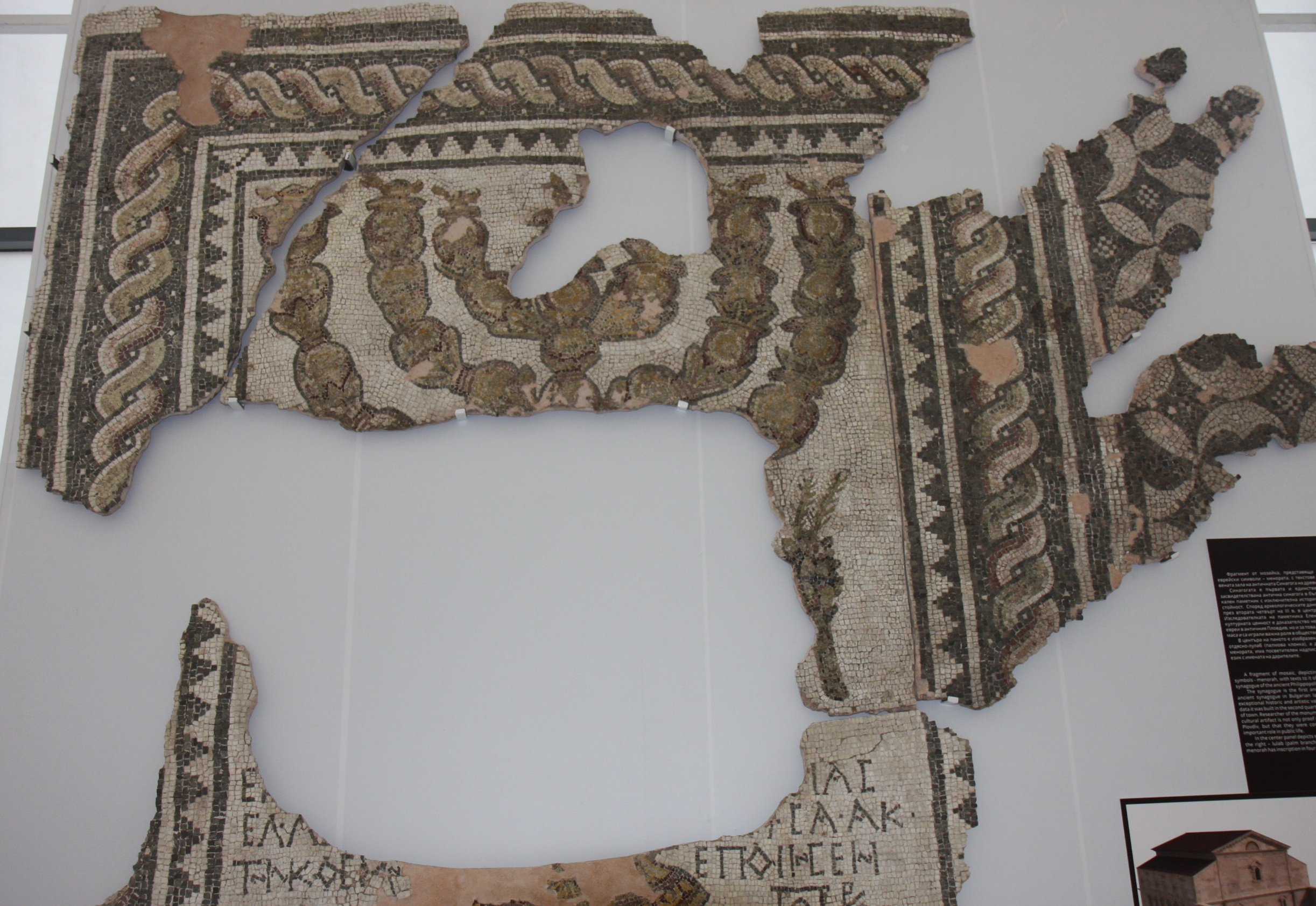
Mosaic fragment from the ancient synagogue of Philippopolis in the Regional Archeological Museum of Plovdiv

Jews are believed to have settled in the region after the Roman conquest in 46 CE. Ruins of "sumptuous" second-century synagogues have been unearthed in Philipopolis (modern Plovdiv), Nicopolis (Nikopol), Ulpia Oescus (Gigen, Pleven Province), and Stobi (now in North Macedonia). The earliest written artifact attesting to the presence of a Jewish community in the Roman province of Moesia Inferior is a late 2nd-century CE Latin inscription found at Ulpia Oescus bearing a menorah and mentioning archisynagogos. Josephus testifies to the presence of a Jewish population in the city. A decree of Roman Emperor Theodosius I from 379 regarding the persecution of Jews and destruction of synagogues in Illyria and Thrace is also proof of early Jewish settlement in Bulgaria.

== 1st & 2nd Bulgarian Empires ==
After the establishment of the First Bulgarian Empire and its recognition in 681, a number of Jews suffering persecution in the Byzantine Empire may have settled in Bulgaria. At its maximum extent in the 9th century Bulgaria included 9th century sites associated with Jews such as Vojvodina, Crișana and Mihai Viteazu, Cluj. Jews also settled in Nikopol in 967.

Some arrived from the Republic of Ragusa and Italy, when merchants from these lands were allowed to trade in the Second Bulgarian Empire by Ivan Asen II. Later, Tsar Ivan Alexander married a Jewish woman, Sarah (renamed Theodora), who had converted to Christianity and had considerable influence in the court. She influenced her spouse to create the Tsardom of Vidin for her son Ivan Shishman, who was also a Jew according to Jewish law, which determines religion according to the mother. Despite her Jewish past, she was fiercely pro-Church, which in those times was accompanied with anti-semitism. For example, in 1352, the church council ordered the expulsion of Jews from Bulgaria for "heretical activity", (though this decree was not rigorously implemented). Physical attacks on Jews followed. In one case, three Jews who had been sentenced to death were killed by a mob despite the sentences having been repealed by the tsar.

The medieval Jewish population of Bulgaria was Romaniote until the 14th to 15th centuries, when Ashkenazim from Hungary (1376) and other parts of Europe began to arrive.

== Ottoman rule ==
By the completion of the Ottoman conquest of the Bulgarian Empire (1396), there were sizable Jewish communities in Vidin, Nikopol, Silistra, Pleven, Sofia, Yambol, Plovdiv (Philippopolis) and Stara Zagora.

In 1470, Ashkenazim banished from Bavaria arrived, and contemporary travellers remarked that Yiddish could often be heard in Sofia. An Ashkenazi prayer book was printed in Saloniki by the rabbi of Sofia in the middle of the 16th century. Beginning in 1494, Sephardic exiles from Spain migrated to Bulgaria via Salonika, Macedonia, Italy, Ragusa, and Bosnia. They settled in pre-existing Jewish population-centres, which were also the major trade centres of Ottoman-ruled Bulgaria. At this point, Sofia was host to three separate Jewish communities: Romaniotes, Ashkenazim and Sephardim. This would continue until 1640, when a single rabbi was appointed for all three groups.

In the 17th century, the ideas of Sabbatai Zevi became popular in Bulgaria, and supporters of his movement, such as Nathan of Gaza and Samuel Primo, were active in Sofia. Jews continued to settle in various parts of the country (including in new trade centres such as Pazardzhik), and were able to expand their economic activities due to the privileges they were given and due to the banishment of many Ragusan merchants who had taken part in the Chiprovtsi Uprising of 1688.

== Modern Bulgaria ==
A modern nation-state of Bulgaria was formed under the terms of the Treaty of Berlin, which ended the Russo-Turkish War of 1877–78. Under the terms of that treaty, Bulgarian Jews of the new country were granted equal rights. In 1909, the massive and grand new Sofia Synagogue was consecrated in the presence of Tsar Ferdinand I of Bulgaria as well as ministers and other important guests, an important event for Bulgarian Jewry. Jews were drafted into the Bulgarian army and fought in the Serbo-Bulgarian War (1885), in the Balkan Wars (1912–13), and in the First World War. 211 Jewish soldiers of the Bulgarian army were recorded as having died during World War I. The Treaty of Neuilly after World War I emphasized Jews' equality with other Bulgarian citizens. In the 1920s and 1930s, fascist and anti-Semitic organizations like Rodna Zashtita and Ratnik were established and grew in influence.

In the years preceding World War II, the population growth rate of the Jewish community lagged behind that of other ethnic groups. In 1920, there were 16,000 Jews, amounting to 0.9% of Bulgarians. By 1934, although the size of the Jewish community had grown to 48,565, with more than half living in Sofia, that only amounted to 0.8% of the general population. Ladino was the dominant language in most communities, but the young often preferred speaking Bulgarian. The Zionist movement was completely dominant among the local population ever since Hovevei Zion.

== World War II ==
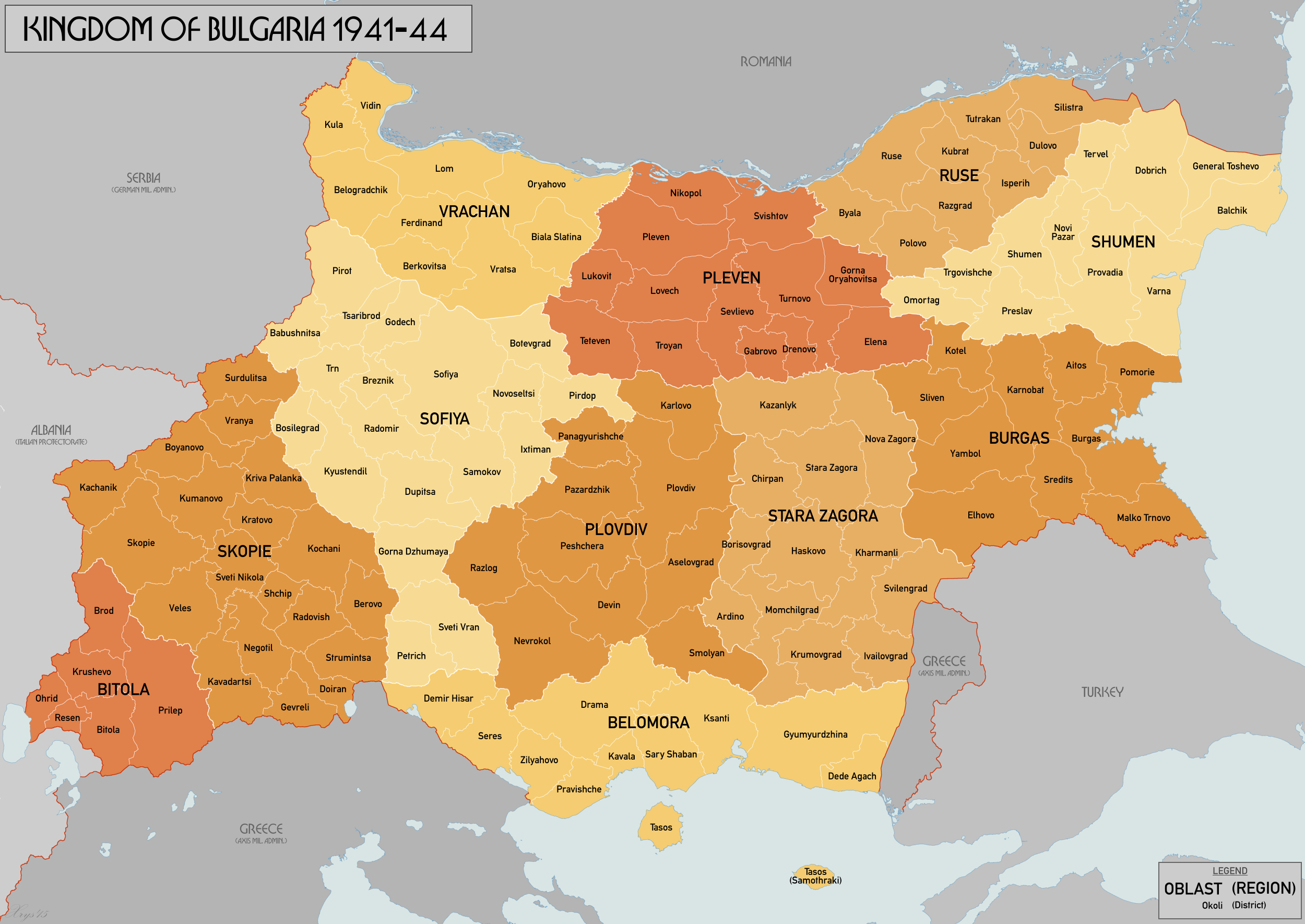
Map of Bulgaria, 1941-44 showing wartime borders.

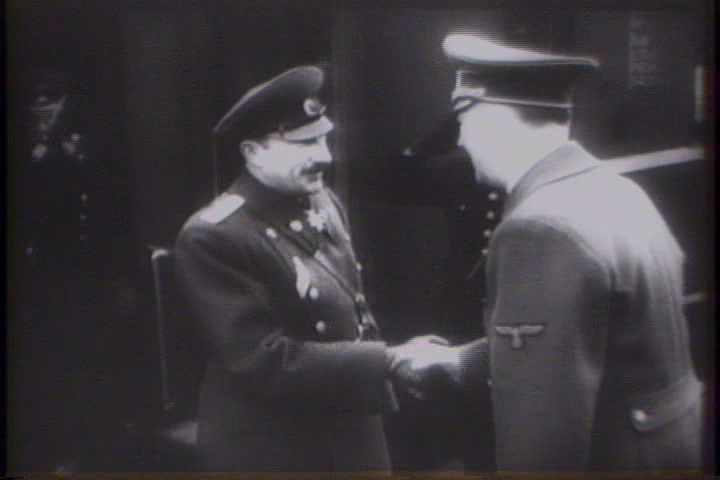
Tsar Boris III and Adolf Hitler in 1943

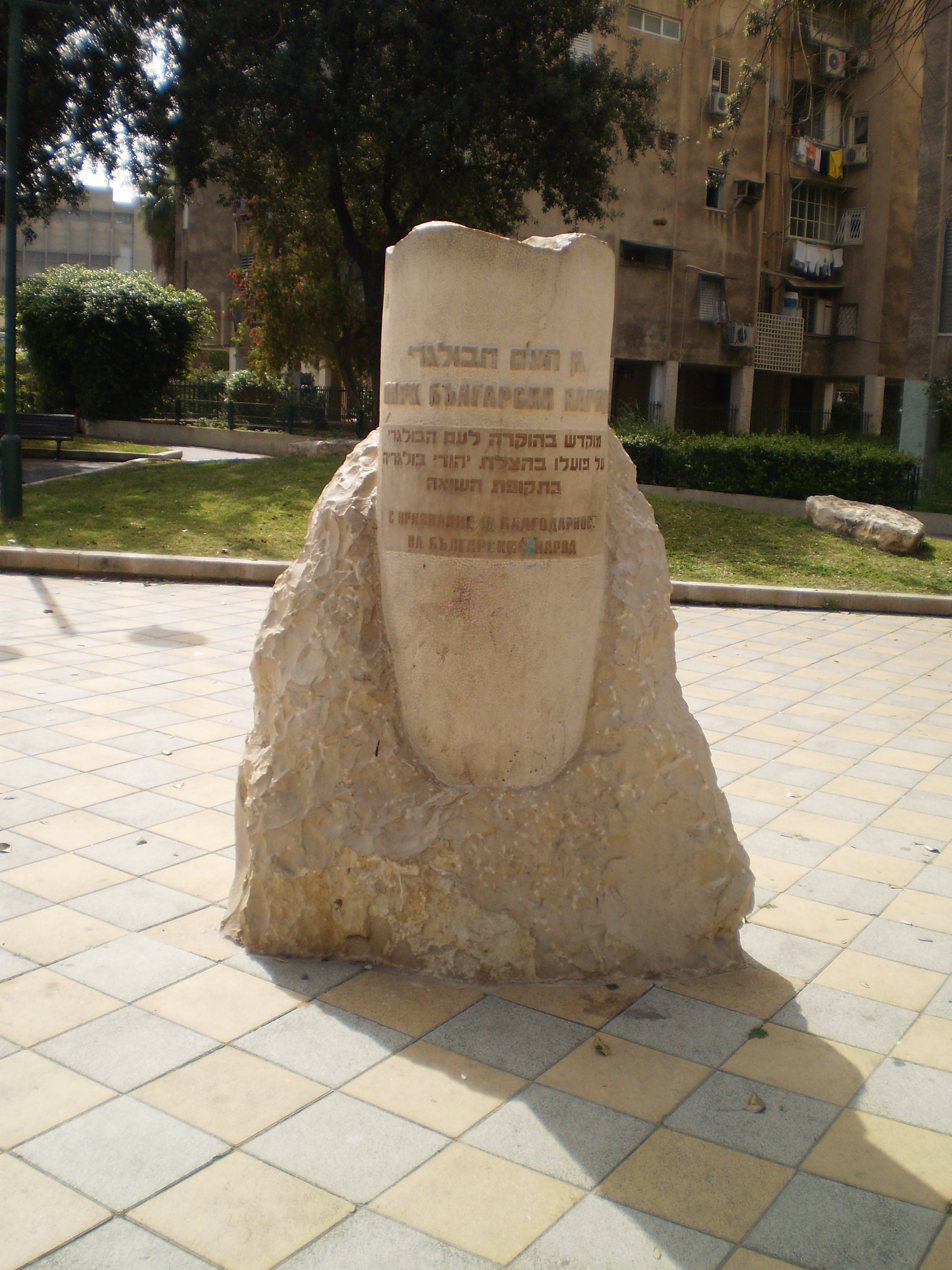
Monument in honour of the Bulgarian people who saved Bulgarian Jews during the Holocaust, Jaffa

Bulgaria, as a potential beneficiary from the Molotov–Ribbentrop Pact in August 1939, had competed with other such nations to curry favour with Nazi Germany by gestures of antisemitic legislation. Bulgaria was economically dependent on Germany, with 65% of Bulgaria's trade in 1939 accounted for by Germany, and militarily bound by an arms deal. Bulgarian extreme nationalists lobbied for a return to the enlarged borders of the 1878 Treaty of San Stefano. On 7 September 1940, Southern Dobruja, lost to Romania under the 1913 Treaty of Bucharest, was returned to Bulgarian control by the Treaty of Craiova, formulated under German pressure. A citizenship law followed on 21 November 1940, which transferred Bulgarian citizenship to the inhabitants of the annexed territory, including around 500 Jews, alongside the territory's Roma, Greeks, Turks, and Romanians. This policy was not replicated in the territories occupied by Bulgaria during the war.

In 1939 Jews who were foreign citizens were forced to leave Bulgaria. This act marked the beginning of the Anti-Jewish propaganda and legislation. Starting in July 1940, Bulgarian authorities began to institute discriminatory policies against Jews. In December 1940, 352 members of the Bulgarian Jewish community boarded the S.S. Salvador at Varna bound for Palestine. The ship sank after running aground 100 metres off the coast of Silivri, west of Istanbul. 223 passengers drowned or died of exposure to frigid waters. Half of the 123 survivors were sent back to Bulgaria, while the remainder were allowed to board the Darien II and continue to Palestine, where they were imprisoned at Atlit by the British Mandate authorities.

A few days later, Tsar Boris III enacted the Law for Protection of the Nation, introduced to the Bulgarian Parliament the preceding October and passed by parliament on 24 December 1940, which imposed numerous legal restrictions on Jews in Bulgaria. The bill was proposed to parliament by Petar Gabrovski, Interior Minister and former Ratnik leader in October 1940. Come into force on January 24, 1941, it was written on the model of the Nuremberg Laws. The law forbade mixed marriages, the access to a set of professions and imposed a 20% additional tax of any Jewish property. Jews were obliged to "wear Davidic badges, to respect curfews, to buy food from particular shops, to avoid public areas and even to stop discussing political and social matters." They were persecuted alongside secret societies like the Freemasons.

Ratniks' protégé, government lawyer and fellow Ratnik, Alexander Belev, had been sent to study the 1933 Nuremberg Laws in Germany and was closely involved in its drafting. Modelled on this precedent, the law targeted Jews, together with Freemasonry and other intentional organizations deemed "threatening" to Bulgarian national security. Specifically, the law prohibited Jews from voting, running for office, working in government positions, serving in the army, marrying or cohabitating with ethnic Bulgarians, using Bulgarian names, or owning rural land. Authorities began confiscating all radios and telephones owned by Jews, and Jews were forced to pay a one-time tax of 20 percent of their net worth. The legislation also established quotas that limited the number of Jews in Bulgarian universities. The law was protested not only by Jewish leaders, but also by the Bulgarian Orthodox Church, some professional organizations, and twenty-one writers. Later that year in March 1941, the Kingdom of Bulgaria acceded to German demands and entered into a military alliance with the Axis powers.

The Law for the Protection of the Nation stipulated that Jews fulfil their compulsory military service in the labour battalions and not the regular army. Forced labour battalions were instituted in Bulgaria in 1920 as a way of circumventing the Treaty of Neuilly-sur-Seine, which limited the size of the Bulgarian military and ended conscription into the regular military. The forced labour service (trudova povinnost) set up by the government of Aleksandar Stamboliyski supplied cheap labour for government projects and employment for demobilised soldiers from the First World War. In the first decade of its existence, more than 150,000 Bulgarian subjects, "primarily minorities (particularly Muslims) and other poor segments of society" had been drafted to serve. In the 1930s, in the lead-up to the Second World War, the trudova povinnost were militarised: attached to the War Ministry in 1934, they were given military ranks in 1936.

After the start of war, in 1940 "labour soldiers" (trudovi vojski) were established as a separate corps "used to enforce anti-Jewish policies during World War Two" as part of an overall "deprivation" plan. In August 1941, at the request of Adolf-Heinz Beckerle – German Minister Plenipotentiary at Sofia – the War Ministry relinquished control of all Jewish forced labour to the Ministry of Buildings, Roads, and Public Works. Mandatory conscription applied from August 1941: initially men 20–44 were drafted, with the age limit rising to 45 in July 1942 and to 50 a year later. Bulgarians replaced Jews in the commands of the Jewish labour units, which were no longer entitled to uniforms. On 29 January 1942, new all-Jewish forced labour battalions were announced; their number was doubled to twenty-four by the end of 1942. Jewish units were separated from the other ethnicities – three quarters of the forced labour battalions were from minorities: Turks, Russians, and residents of the territories occupied by Bulgaria – the rest were drawn from the Bulgarian unemployed.

The Jews in forced labour were faced with discriminatory policies which became stricter as time went on; with increasing length of service and decreasing the allowance of food, rest, and days off. On 14 July 1942 a disciplinary unit was established to impose new punitive strictures: deprivation of mattresses or hot food, a "bread-and-water diet", and the barring of visitors for months at time. As the war progressed, and round-ups of Jews began in 1943, Jews made more numerous efforts to escape and punishments became increasingly harsh.

In late 1938 and early 1939 Bulgarian police officials and the Interior Ministry were already increasingly opposed to the admittance of Jewish refugees from persecution in Central Europe. In response to a query by British diplomats in Sofia, the Foreign Ministry confirmed the policy that from April 1939, Jews from Germany, Romania, Poland, Italy, and what remained of Czechoslovakia (and later Hungary) would be required to obtain consent from the ministry to secure entry, transit, or passage visas. Nevertheless, at least 430 visas (and probably around 1,000) were issued by Bulgarian diplomats to foreign Jews, of which there were as many as 4,000 in Bulgaria in 1941. On 1 April 1941 the Police Directorate allowed the departure of 302 Jewish refugees, mostly underage, from Central Europe for the express purpose of Bulgaria "freeing itself from the foreign element".

The Bulgarian irredentist seizure in 1941 of coveted territory from Greece and Yugoslavia and the formation of the new oblasts of Skopje, Bitola, and Belomora increased Bulgaria's Jewish population to around 60,000. These were forbidden to have Bulgarian citizenship under the Law for the Protection of the Nation.

From early in the war, Bulgarian occupation authorities in Greece and Yugoslavia handed over Jewish refugees fleeing from Axis Europe to the Gestapo. In October 1941 Bulgarian authorities demanded the registration of 213 Serbian Jews detected by the Gestapo in Bulgarian-administered Skopje; they were arrested on 24 November and 47 of these were taken to Banjica concentration camp in Belgrade, Serbia and killed on 3 December 1941.

In the wake of the Wannsee Conference, German diplomats requested, in the spring of 1942, that the Kingdom release into German custody all Jews residing in Bulgarian-administered territory. The Bulgarian side agreed and began to take steps for the planned deportations of Jews.

The Law was followed by a decree-law (naredbi) on 26 August 1942, which tightened restrictions on Jews, widened the definition of Jewishness, and increased the burdens of proof required to prove non-Jewish status and exemptions (privilegii). Jews were thereafter required to wear yellow stars, excepting only those baptized who practised the Christian eucharist. Bulgarian Jews married to non-Jews by Christian rite before 1 September 1940 and baptized before the 23 January 1941 enforcement of the Law for the Protection of the Nation had the exemptions allowed to such cases by the Law rescinded. Exemptions for war orphans, war widows, and the disabled veterans were henceforth applicable only "in the event of competition with other Jews", and all such privilegii could be revoked or denied if the individual was convicted of a crime or deemed "anti-government" or "communist".

On 22 February 1943, the Bulgarian authorities finalized arrangements with Adolf Eichmann's office for the first wave of planned deportations, targeting total of 20,000 Jews, of which 8,000 were in Bulgaria and about 12,000 were in the Bulgarian-occupied territories of Thrace, Macedonia. On 27 March 1943 U.S. President Roosevelt discussed "the question of the 60 or 70 thousand Jews that are in Bulgaria and are threatened with extermination..." with the British Foreign Secretary Anthony Eden, who effectively refused such an effort, on the grounds that "if we do that then the Jews of the world will be wanting us to make a similar offer in Poland and Germany [...] there are simply not enough ships."

In the first days of March 1943, Bulgarian military and police carried out the deportation of all 11,343 Jews from the Bulgarian-occupied territories of Macedonia, Thrace and Pirot, transported them by train through Bulgaria via transit camps established for the purpose there, and embarked them on boats bound for Vienna in Nazi Germany. Twelve of them would survive. Also in March 1943 Bulgarian military police, assisted by German soldiers, massacred deported Jews from Komotini and Kavala, who were on board passenger steamship Karageorge, and sank the vessel.

When the deportation moved from the occupied territories to the pre-1941 ones, news of the preparations for the deportations incited protest among opposition politicians, members of the clergy and intellectuals in Bulgaria. While Tsar Boris III was initially inclined to continue with the planned deportations, on March 9 several members of the ruling party in the Parliament - Petar Mikhalev, Dimitar Ikonomov, the deputy speaker Dimitar Peshev and others forced the interior minister Gabrovski to temporary halt the deportation of the rest of the Jews. On March 17, 1943, Peshev sent a letter, signed by 42 more members of the Parliament, to the prime-minister Bogdan Filov, in which he wrote that "It is impossible for us to accept that plans have been made to deport these people, even though ill-minded rumours attribute this intention to the Bulgarian government." For his role in preparing the letter, Peshev was forced to resign. More protests took place, notably those from Metropolitan Stefan I, which pressured the tsar to suspend the deportations indefinitely in May 1943. Shortly thereafter, the Bulgarian government expelled 20,000 Jews from Sofia to the provinces. Special trains were arranged and the Jews were assigned specific departures, separating family members. A maximum of 30 kg of property per person was allowed; the rest they were forced to leave behind or to sell at "abusively low" prices, and part of it was otherwise pilfered or stolen. Bulgarian officials and neighbours benefited from this process.

The Bulgarian government cited labour shortages as the reason for refusing to transfer Bulgarian Jews into German custody. Expelled men were conscripted as forced labour within Bulgaria. Some of the property left behind was confiscated. Shortly after returning to Sofia from an August 14 meeting with Hitler, Boris died of apparent heart failure on 28 August 1943.

Dimitar Peshev, opposition politicians, the Bulgarian Church, prominent writers and artists, lawyers and former diplomats, have been variously credited with rescuing the Bulgarian Jews.

In 1998, Bulgarian Jews in the United States and a private organization, called Jewish National Fund, erected a monument in the Bulgarian Forest in Israel honouring Tsar Boris. However, in July 2003, a public committee headed by Chief Justice Moshe Bejski decided to remove the memorial because Tsar Boris had consented to the deportation of the Jews from occupied territories of Macedonia, Thrace and Pirot to the Germans.

== After World War II and diaspora ==
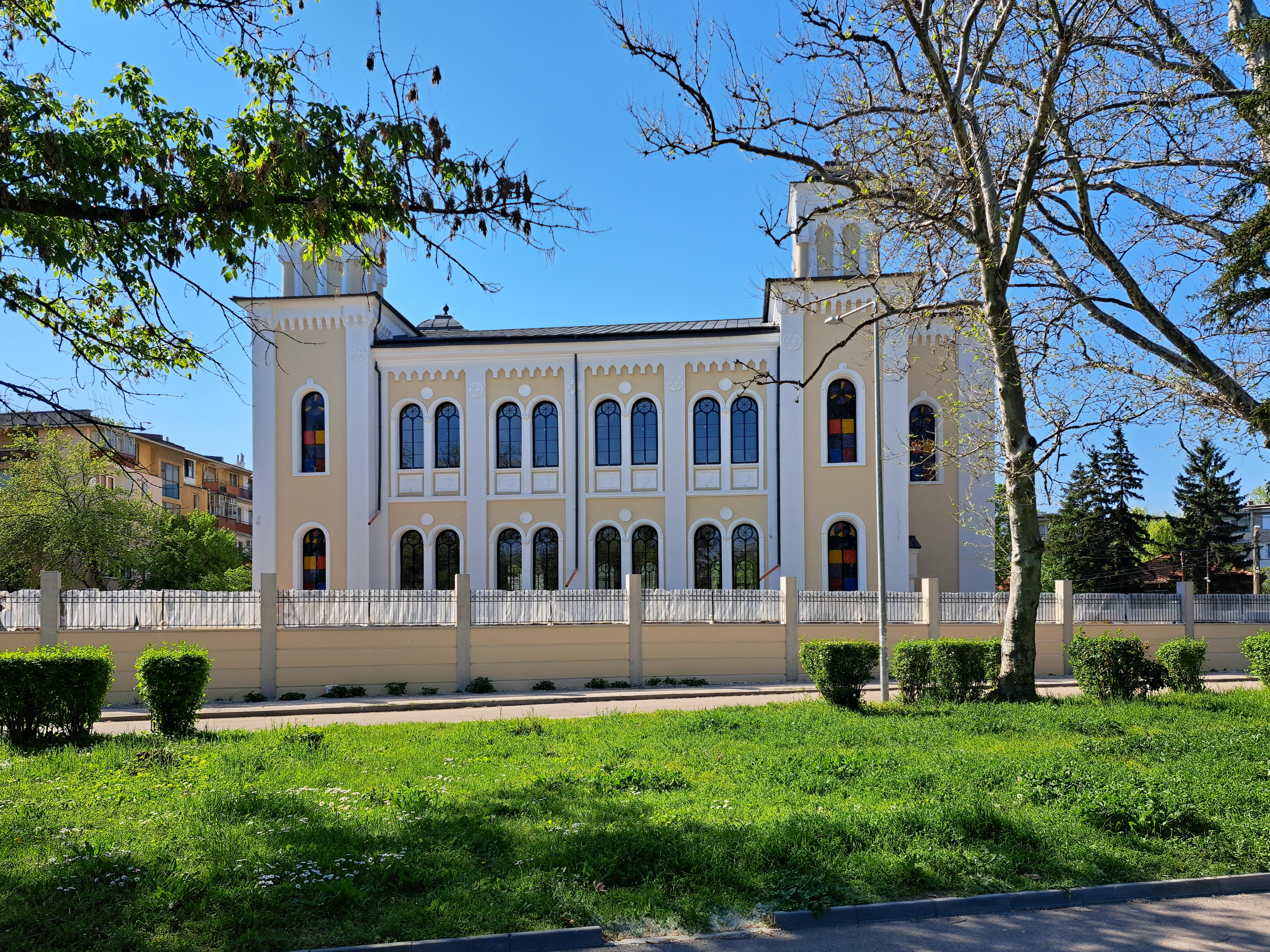
Newly renovated Vidin Synagogue (2023)

After the war, most of the Jewish population left for Israel, leaving only about a thousand Jews living in Bulgaria today (1,162 according to the 2011 census). According to Israeli government statistics, 43,961 people from Bulgaria emigrated to Israel between 1948 and 2006, making Bulgarian Jews the fourth largest group to come from a European country, after the Soviet Union, Romania and Poland. The various migrations outside of Bulgaria has produced descendants of Bulgarian Jews mainly in Israel, but also in the United States, Canada, Australia, and some Western European and Latin American countries.

Representatives of Bulgaria's Jewish community did not attend an official ceremony in March 2023 celebrating the 80th anniversary of Tsar Boris III's decision to save the country's Jews from the Holocaust. Alexander Oscar, president of the Shalom Bulgarian Jewish organization, cited Bulgaria being an ally of Nazi Germany and Bulgaria's facilitation of the murders of the Jews of adjacent regions it occupied during World War II as among the reasons for not attending.

== Historical Jewish population ==
Info from the Bulgarian censuses, with the exception of 2010:

Historical population
Year	Pop.	±%
1880	18,519	—
1887	23,571	+27.3%
1892	27,531	+16.8%
1900	33,661	+22.3%
1905	37,663	+11.9%
1910	40,133	+6.6%
1920	43,209	+7.7%
1926	46,558	+7.8%
1934	48,565	+4.3%
1946	44,209	−9.0%
1956	6,027	−86.4%
1965	5,108	−15.2%
1992	3,461	−32.2%
2010	2,000	−42.2%
2021	1,153	−42.4%

Year	% Jewish
1900	0.90%
1905	0.93%
1910	0.93%
1920	0.89%
1926	0.84%
1934	0.80%
1946	0.63%
1956	0.08%
1965	0.06%
1992	0.04%
2010	0.03%

== Notable Bulgarian Jews ==
- Albert Aftalion (1874–1956), economist, from Ruse
- Mira Aroyo (born 1977), musician and member of Ladytron, from Sofia
- Gredi Assa (born 1954 in Pleven), professor, Academy of Fine Arts, Sofia
- Maksim Behar (born 1955), businessman and public relations professional, from Shumen
- Avram Benaroya (1887–1979), left-wing political activist
- Israel Calmi (1885–1966), member of the Jewish Consistory of Bulgaria
- Elias Canetti (1905–1994), Nobel Prize-winning writer, from Ruse
- Tobiah ben Eliezer (11th century), talmudist and poet, from Kostur
- Itzhak Fintzi (born 1933), actor, from Sofia
- Samuel Finzi (born 1966), actor, from Plovdiv
- Solomon Goldstein (1884–1968–1969), communist politician, from Shumen
- Moshe Gueron (born 1926), cardiologist and researcher, from Sofia
- Joseph Karo (1488–1575), author of Shulchan Aruch, raised in Nikopol
- Nikolay Kaufman (1925–2018), musicologist and composer, from Ruse
- Milcho Leviev (born 1937), composer and musician, from Plovdiv
- Yehuda Levi (born 1979), Israeli actor and male model
- Emanuel Levy (born 1949), professor of film and sociology, author of The Habima: Israel's National Theater
- Kiril Marichkov (1944–2024), singer, bassist and songwriter, founder of Shturcite
- Jacob L. Moreno (1889–1974), founder of psychodrama, father from Pleven
- Judah Leon ben Moses Mosconi (1328–?), talmudist born at Ohrid
- Eliezer Papo (1785–1828) writer on religious subjects, born in Sarajevo, became rabbi in Silistra
- Jules Pascin (1885–1930), modernist painter, from Vidin
- Isaac Passy (1928–2010), philosopher, from Plovdiv
- Solomon Passy (born 1956), politician and former Minister of Foreign Affairs, from Plovdiv
- Valeri Petrov (1920–2014), writer, from Sofia
- Solomon Abraham Rosanes (1862–1938), historian, major contributor on the history of the Jews in the Balkans, from Ruschuk (Ruse)
- Solomon Rozanis (1919–2004), supreme court judge and lawyer, from Ruse
- Shulamit Shamir (1923–2011), militant and activist, wife of Israeli prime minister Yitzhak Shamir, from Sofia
- Sarah-Theodora (14th century), wife of Tsar Ivan Alexander
- Pancho Vladigerov (1899–1978) composer, teacher. Mother was Jewish. Bulgaria's National Academy of Music in Sofia is named after him.
- Angel Wagenstein (1922–2023), film director, from Plovdiv
- Alexis Weissenberg (1929–2012), pianist, from Plovdiv

=== Knesset members ===
- Binyamin Arditi (1897–1981), from Sofia
- Michael Bar-Zohar (born 1938), from Sofia
- Shimon Bejarano (1910–1971), from Plovdiv
- Ya'akov Nehoshtan (1925–2019), from Kazanlak
- Ya'akov Nitzani (1900–1962), from Plovdiv
- Victor Shem-Tov (1915–2014), from Samokov
- Emanuel Zisman (1935–2009), from Plovdiv

== See also ==
- History of the Jews in Sofia
- Bulgaria–Israel relations
- List of synagogues in Bulgaria
- Bulgarian Jews in Israel
