= Ivan Dimitrov Strogov =

Former Bulgarian diplomat and attorney

Dr. Ivan Dimitrov Strogov (Bulgarian: Иван Димитров Строгов); was a former Bulgarian diplomat and an attorney. On May 25, 1944, he addressed Tsar Boris III in a letter protesting the deportation of Bulgarian Jews during World War II. His letter was received by Royal Adviser Khandzhiev in lieu of the tsar, and responded to accordingly: "His majesty fully concurs with you regarding the Jews. He will do everything in his power to alleviate the lot of our compatriots of Jewish origin." Strogov played a role in preventing the deportation of some 8,000 Jews from Bulgaria to the German East, intended for November that same year.

Strogov was the father to Piotr Dimitrov Strogov, who had one son, Kaloyan Dimitrov Strogov, a living descendant with three children: Leelila, Peter, and Tara.

== Letter to Tsar Boris III ==
Strogov's letter to Tsar Boris III was a strongly-worded declaration, written in the height of protests and demonstrations against the deportation of 8,000 of Bulgaria's Jewish population. The letter read as follows:

"I protest the cruel persecution of Bulgarian Jewry, now awaiting relocation and/or deportation with only 15 kilos of luggage and 500 leva in money ... Having been most shrewdly robbed, Bulgarian Jews are now being sent to obvious ruination, indeed to physical destruction and certain death, just as the Jews of Thrace and Macedonia were ... Your responsibility for what is happening today and what will happen tomorrow to our compatriots in foreign, hostile lands is personal and irrefutable. I therefore raise my voice of indignation against the insanity of a policy that sentences Bulgarian Jewry to sure and senseless annihilation, and I beseech Your Majesty to stop the order immediately, without delay!"

This letter succeeded the deportation of 4,000 Jews of Thrace and 7,400 of Macedonia, as they lived in Bulgarian-controlled lands.
