= Albert Salomon =

Albert Salomon may refer to:

- Albert Salomon Anselm von Rothschild, banker in Austria-Hungary
- Albert Salomon (sociologist), German sociologist
- Albert Salomon (surgeon), German surgeon
- Albert Salomon (musician), Bulgarian-Israeli troubadour and accordionist
