= Novinite =

Bulgarian newspaper and news website

- Format: Online newspaper
- Founder: Maxim Behar
- Publisher: One Click Media Group
- Founded: March 11, 2001; 24 years ago
- Language: American English
- City: Sofia
- Country: Bulgaria
- Sister newspapers: Sofia Morning News; The Sofia Weekly
- Website: www.novinite.com

Novinite is a Bulgarian English-language news provider based in Sofia. "Novinite" (Bulgarian: Новините) means "The News" in Bulgarian. It is also sometimes referred to as SNA (Sofia News Agency) by its forum users. Through its website novinite.com/sofianewsagency.com and its Breaking News newsletter, Novinite.com provides coverage of events and developments in Bulgaria and around the world.

Novinite publishes Sofia Morning News, an online daily newspaper with paid subscription, and The Sofia Weekly, a free online weekly newspaper which comes out every Saturday.

Its website includes a forum, a free archive with more than 101,000 articles, a search engine, and news alerts.

Novinite is part of One Click Media Group.

== History ==
Novinite was founded in 2001 by the Bulgarian journalist, businessman, and public relations expert, Maxim Behar. It was formally launched on March 11, 2001.

In addition to the website, Novinite's first online daily newspaper, Sofia Morning News (called Bulgarian Breaking News at the time), was launched on June 1, 2001.

== Articles ==
- On December 21, 2008, Novinite published its 100,000th news article, an average of 35 news articles per day.
- The first news article published by Novinite was: "Radisson SAS Opens in Sofia" (March 11, 2001).
- Novinite's 10,000th news article was: "Israeli PM Ariel Sharon Won't Allow Ultra-Orthodox Parties to Rejoin Coalition" (May 22, 2002).
- Novinite's 50,000th news article was: "King's Party: Saxe-Coburg May Not Head Next Cabinet" (July 14, 2005).
- Novinite's 100,000th news article was about Novinite itself: "Novinite.com Becomes Media Partner of Invest in Bulgaria 2009 Business Summit" (December 21, 2008).

== Coverage ==
The editorial team of Novinite provides news coverage in English of every aspect of contemporary Bulgaria including business and economy, politics, sports, society, culture, and lifestyle. Novinite features headlines covering the major world events and developments.

Novinite uses American English.

== Readership ==
Novinite's readers include foreign businessmen and managers of multinational corporations doing or planning to do business in Bulgaria, diplomats in foreign embassies in Sofia and from all over the world, foreign citizens living in Bulgaria, foreign tourists, members of the Bulgarian immigrant communities around the world, and Bulgaria lovers.
