= Daniel Zion =

Bulgarian rabbi (1883–1979)

Rabbi Daniel Solomon Zion דניאל ציון
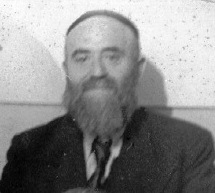

Personal life
- Born: 3 August 1883 Salonica, Ottoman Empire
- Died: 13 November 1979 (aged 96) Jaffa, Tel Aviv, Israel

Religious life
- Religion: Judaism
- Denomination: Orthodox (later Messianic Judaism)

Daniel Solomon Zion (Hebrew: דניאל ציון; 3 August 1883, Salonica – 13 November 1979, Jaffa) was an Orthodox rabbi, Kabbalist and political activist. Zion moved to Sofia, Bulgaria, as a shochet (ritual butcher) and cantor. Bulgaria's Jewish community at the time was almost completely assimilated, and there were no ultra-Orthodox communities in the country during World War II. In 1950, after emigrating to Israel, Zion was removed from his position on the local rabbinical court for his newfound belief that Jesus of Nazareth was the Jewish Messiah.

== The Holocaust in Bulgaria and subsequent life in Israel ==
In May 1943, alongside Chief Rabbi Dr. Asher Hananel (1895–1964), Zion helped prevent the deportation of nearly 50,000 Jews from Sofia. They did so by appealing to the Metropolitan Bishop of Sofia, Metropolitan Stefan, then head of the Bulgarian Orthodox Church in Sofia. Bishop Stefan then appealed to Tsar Boris III.

On 24 May 1943, Rabbi Zion addressed a gathering at a synagogue, then participated in a mass street demonstration against the anti-Jewish Law for protection of the nation. This law was in effect between 23 January 1941 to 27 November 1944. Two days after the demonstration, Zion was arrested among many others. Having previously enjoyed refuge under the protection of Bishop Stefan, he was transported to a concentration camp for Jews at Somovit, on the bank of the Danube.

After the war, Communist interests appointed Zion Chief Rabbi of Sofia. As a result, he was given the moniker "the Red Rabbi.". In 1949, Zion immigrated to Jaffa in the newly formed state of Israel.

In June 1950, for reasons to be discussed in the following section, a panel of Israeli rabbis ruled that Zion was mentally ill and removed him from the rabbinical court in Jaffa.

== Relationship with Christianity ==
Not long after his arrival in Israel, Rabbi Zion was accused of having an interest in Dunovism, a Bulgarian mystical Christian sect led by Peter Dunov. Dunovism combined elements of Orthodox Christianity with local Bulgarian religious practices.

On 13 June 1950, an Israeli periodical reported that the then Chief Ashkenazi Rabbi of Tel Aviv, Rabbi Isser Yehuda Unterman (1946-1964), had interviewed Sephardi Jews who knew Zion personally.

The Sephardim reported that Zion had become increasingly anxious in recent times. They claimed that he had fasted for three days and he was hallucinating and experiencing visions. Ultimately, a conference of rabbis declared him "insane." Zion was not allowed to enter any synagogue in the city of Jaffa. He was relieved from his duties as a judge on the Beit din, ostensibly because Zion had come to hold a faith in Jesus.

Zion was interviewed on 14 September 1952 by Kol Yisrael Radio, the national radio station, which was broadcast in Jerusalem. He expressed his view that Jesus fulfilled the various messianic prophecies. Zion further claimed that he served as the president of the Union of Messianic Jews in Israel (Ichud Yehudim Meshihiim Be-Israel), an organization founded by Abram Poljak.

The Israeli newspaper Herut ran a detailed piece on Daniel Zion in 1960 that highlighted his insistence that he was not a convert and that he opposed Jewish assimilation.

== Later life and death ==
Despite being removed from the rabbinical court, Zion continued to serve as a rabbi for Bulgarian Jews until 1973. He died in Jaffa in 1979.

== Works ==
- Iz Nov Put,(Sofia, 1941)
- Pet godini pod fashistki gnet, (Memoir: Five Years Under Fascist Oppression), (Sofia, 1945)
- Troiniya put na Noviya Chovek, (Sofia, 1946)
- Seder ha-Tephilot: Tephilat Daniel(Sofia, 1946)
