= Nikolay Kaufman =

Bulgarian musicologist, folklorist, and composer (1925–2018)

Nikolay Yankov Kaufman (Bulgarian: Николай Янков Кауфман; 23 September 1925 – 26 March 2018) was a Bulgarian musicologist, folklorist and composer, sometimes cited as Bulgaria's foremost scholar in his field.

Kaufman was born in the Danubian town of Ruse to an Ashkenazi Jewish Bulgarian family. In 1952, he graduated in trumpet and music theory from the National Academy of Music in Sofia.

From 1952-88, he worked at the Bulgarian Academy of Sciences' Institute of Music; he then moved to the Institute of Folkloristics. Beginning in 1978, he was a lecturer at the National Academy of Music. He was awarded a doctor's degree in 1973.

Kaufman's compositions include over a thousand arrangements of Bulgarian, Ashkenazi and Sephardi Jewish folk songs, his own songs composed in a Bulgarian folk style and piano pieces. Some of the Bulgarian State Television Female Vocal Choir's recordings were based on Kaufman's arrangements of Bulgarian folk songs, including some in the choir's Grammy Award-winning album Le Mystère des Voix Bulgares, Vol. II.

Kaufman's work as a musicologist covers the recording of over 30,000 Bulgarian folk songs and tunes, the result of his theoretical and field studies. He produced a number of books, collections and articles. Since 1997, he has been a corresponding member of the Bulgarian Academy of Sciences and an academician since 2003. He received a number of professional prizes and awards.
