= Bulgaria–Israel relations =

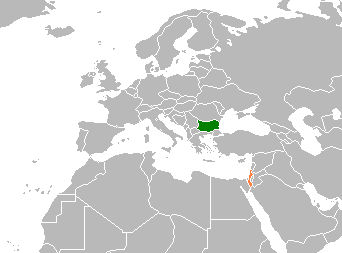

- Bulgaria: Israel

Diplomatic mission
- Bulgarian embassy, Tel Aviv: Israeli embassy, Sofia

Bulgaria–Israel relations are foreign relations between Bulgaria and Israel. Bulgaria recognized Israel on 29 November 1948 and the two countries opened embassies in 1952. Bulgaria, along with the rest of the Soviet bloc, severed diplomatic relations with Israel following the Six-Days War on 10 June 1967. Relations were officially restored at the level of embassies on 3 May 1990.

Bulgaria and Israel maintain a strong friendly relationship.The Bulgarian-Israeli relationship covers many aspects of tourism, military, trade, culture, economics, education, and more. Bulgaria has an embassy in Tel Aviv and Israel has an embassy in Sofia.

== History ==
=== 1948–1990 ===
Bulgaria recognized Israel on 29 November 1948 and opened an embassy in 1952.

On 27 July 1955, the Bulgarian Air Force accidentally shot down El Al Flight 402 from London to Tel Aviv via Vienna. All 7 crew and 51 passengers on board were killed.

On 10 June 1967 Bulgaria closed the embassy in Tel Aviv and severed diplomatic relations with Israel due to the Six-Day War. The Austrian embassy in Tel Aviv served as a Protecting power for Bulgarian interests. Bulgaria, as part of the Soviet Bloc, voted in favor of the United Nations General Assembly Resolution 3379, which determined "that Zionism is a form of racism and racial discrimination"

=== From 1990 ===
After the collapse of the People's Republic of Bulgaria and the establishment of the Republic of Bulgaria, Bulgaria and Israel restored their relationship at the level of embassies on 3 May 1990. In 1991 was the first state visit of Israeli prime minister, Yitzhak Shamir, to Bulgaria, and a year after in 1992, was the first state visit of Bulgarian prime minister, Filip Dimitrov, to Israel.

On 16 December 1996, Bulgaria and Israel signed a Protection on Investment Agreement.

On 18 January 2000, Bulgaria and Israel signed an Avoidance of Double Taxation Agreement.

On 15 July 2007, Bulgaria and Israel signed a visa free agreement.

== Economic relations ==
Since Bulgaria joined the European Union in 2007, Bulgaria and Israel have a Free Trade Agreement as part of the European Union Association Agreement.

Bulgaria – Israel trade in millions USD-$
	Israel imports Bulgaria exports	Bulgaria imports Israel exports	Total trade value
2023	151.2	78.9	230.1
2022	165.8	64.7	230.5
2021	143.2	51.2	194.4
2020	111.7	47.5	159.2
2019	106.6	39.9	146.5
2018	92	41	133
2017	97.8	51.9	149.7
2016	91	38.7	129.7
2015	82.7	88.8	171.5
2014	62.1	128.7	190.8
2013	62.2	53.8	116
2012	56.9	75.3	132.2
2011	62.1	219.3	281.4
2010	60.6	112.4	173
2009	42	69.8	111.8
2008	52	56.2	108.2
2007	63.8	54.3	118.1
2006	48.1	48	96.1
2005	48.2	42.2	90.4
2004	46	30.3	76.3
2003	35.2	23.7	58.9
2002	32.3	20.8	53.1

== Tourism ==
Tourism of Bulgarians in Israel and Israelis in Bulgaria
	2023	2022	2021	2020	2019	2018	2017	2016	2015
Tourists from Bulgaria Arriving to Israel	20.5	9.6	0.7	3.2	19.8	16.4	11.8	8.4	8.7
Tourists from Israel Arriving to Bulgaria	206.6	174.0	54.3	54.2	246.4	245.6	209.3	183.8	155.3

== Resident diplomatic missions ==
- Bulgaria has an embassy in Tel Aviv.
- Israel has an embassy in Sofia.

== See also ==
- Foreign relations of Bulgaria
- Foreign relations of Israel
- History of the Jews in Bulgaria
- The Holocaust in Bulgaria
- Bulgarian Jews in Israel
- List of synagogues in Bulgaria
