= Maxim Behar =

Bulgarian businessman of Jewish descent

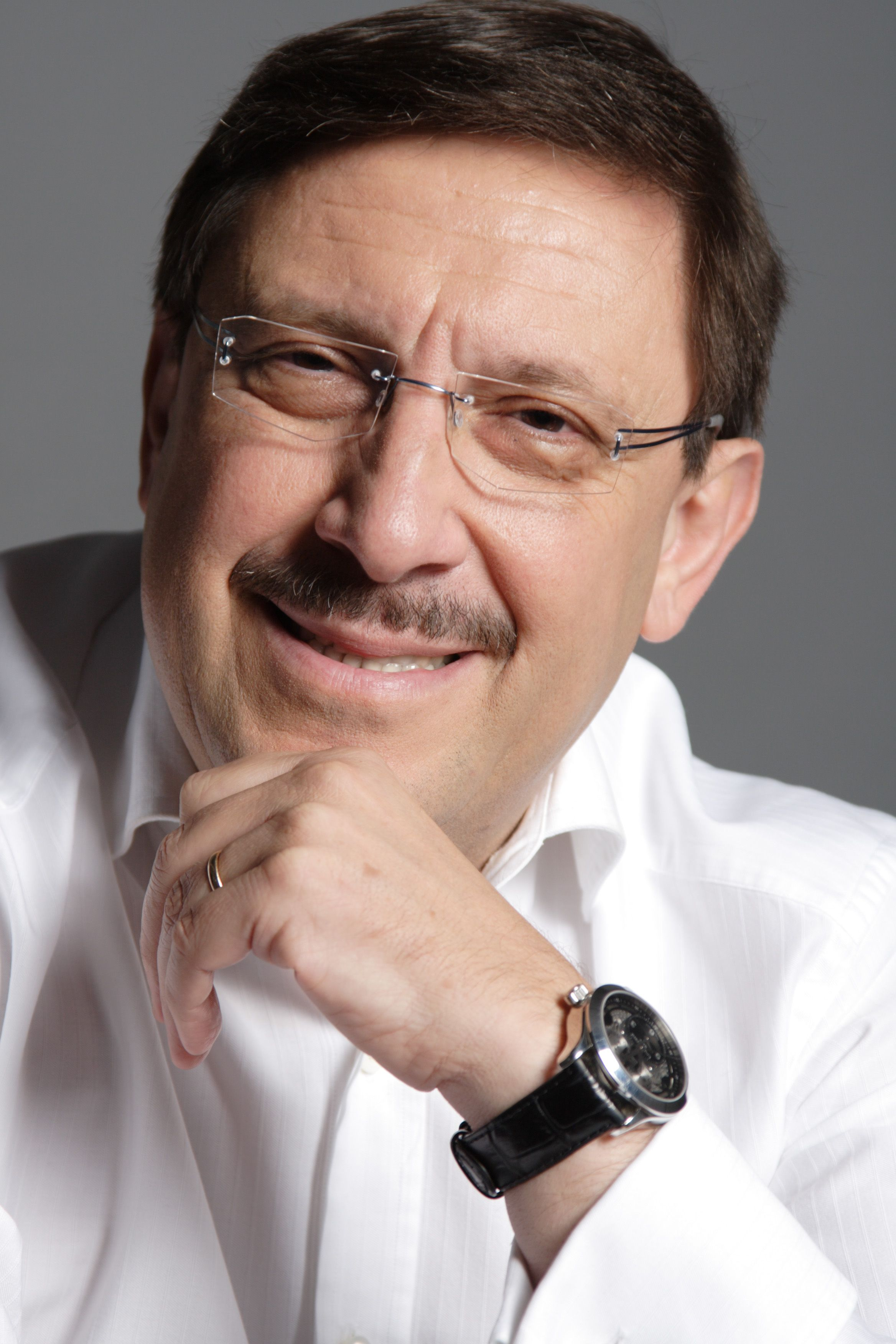
- Born: December 10, 1955 (age 70); Shumen, Bulgaria
- Occupations: PR expert, diplomat, journalist

Maxim Behar (Bulgarian: Максим Бехар; Hebrew: מקסים בכר) is a Bulgarian businessman of Jewish descent. He is the CEO and Chairman of the Board of M3 Communications Group, Inc, a public relations and public affairs company, and a Hill+Knowlton Strategies partner since 2000. Behar is also president of the International Communications Consultancy Organization, board member of PR Museum in New York, and a frequent speaker at national and international events. He is also Chairman of the Board of World Communications Forum in Davos.

== Life and career ==
=== Journalism ===
- 1985-1989: Correspondent of Rabotnichesko delo daily in Shumen, Bulgaria.
- 1989-1991: Correspondent of Rabotnichesko delo daily in Warsaw, Poland.
- 1992-1995: Co-founder of the Standard Daily, one of the first private daily newspapers in Bulgaria, where he was the Managing Editor.

=== Businesses ===
- 1994: Founded M3 Communications Group, Inc.
- 2003: Co-founder and shareholder, with former Nevada Governor Bob Miller, of a Bulgarian-American consultancy company Miller & Behar Strategies.
- 2003: Founder and Chairman of the Board of M3 Communications College, the first and the only fully licensed college in Bulgaria of Public communication studies, now associated with the Manhattan Institute of Management in New York.

=== Education ===
- 1983: Graduated international economic relations at the Prague Economic University.
- 1999: Graduated the Full Corporate Program of Japanese Style of Management, AOTS, Yokohama Kenshu Center, Japan.
- 2011: Executive Management Training at the Pacific Institute by Lou Tice in Seattle, WA

== Executive positions and organizational memberships ==
- 1997-2000: Board member and Executive Director for the Bulgarian Investment Forum.
- 1999-2012: Member of the Boards of Junior Achievement Bulgaria.
- 1999-current: Full member of the International Public Relations Association.
- 2001-2007: President of the Bulgarian Business Leaders Forum.
- 2002-current: Founder and Chairman of the Bulgarian-Polish Business Club.
- 2002-current: Founding member of the Board of Trustees of Every Child Foundation.
- 2003-2011: Member of the Central Israelite Spiritual Council in Bulgaria.
- 2005-current: Full member of the Public Relations Society of America
- 2005-current: Vice-President of the Atlantic Club in Bulgaria.
- 2012-current: Chairman at Hill+Knowlton Strategies, Czech Republic.

== Diplomatic service ==
- 2004: Appointed as Honorary Consul of the Republic of Seychelles to Bulgaria.

== Awards and recognition ==
- 2005: Honorary citizen of Shumen.
- 2012: The Bulgarian monthly Economy magazine presented its yearly award to Maxim Behar for achievements in Business Communications.
- 2012: Named "Manager of the year" in an independent online vote by the Bulgarian Manager magazine and TV Channel bTV.
- 2012: The Association of Business Communications of India announced Behar as "Communicator of the Decade".
- 2015: The Gold Stevie Award.
