= Salomon Rosanes =

Salomon Rosanes (b. 1862-d.1938) was a historian of Ottoman Jewry and himself a Sephardic Jew from Bulgaria. He is the author of Divre yeme Yisrael be-Togarmah (History of the Jews in Turkey), called an "important book" by Avraham Elmaleh in his inaugural Hebrew language essay published in 1919 for the journal Mizarah u-Ma'arav. The History of the Jews in Turkey has been described as a "classic" and "celebrated" work.

The six volume Divre yeme Yisrael be-Togarmah is considered the standard general history of Jews in the Ottoman Empire. It has been described as "a monument to Turkish Jewish learning" because of its emphasis on Ottoman rabbinic sources. Despite its shortcomings, like an unrealistic and uncritical portrayal of Jewish political and economic life in a "benevolent" Ottoman Empire, Rosanes' work is unmatched in its attention to the literary and scholarly culture of Ottoman Jews and has been an essential primary source for studies of Ottoman Jewish communities.

After hearing of the Dolya massacre from Baruch Ben-Jacob, who was at the time trying to have the pogrom recognized in the Jewish histories Rosanes included an excerpt from Ben-Jacob's study in the History of Jews in Turkey.

According to Nissim Behar, Rosanes was influenced by the Hebrew language teacher Rabbi Hayyim Babani who taught at the Alliance Israelite Universelle school in Constantinople.
