= Albert Salomon (musician) =

Israeli troubadour, accordion player and social activist (1935-2020)

- אלברט סלומון
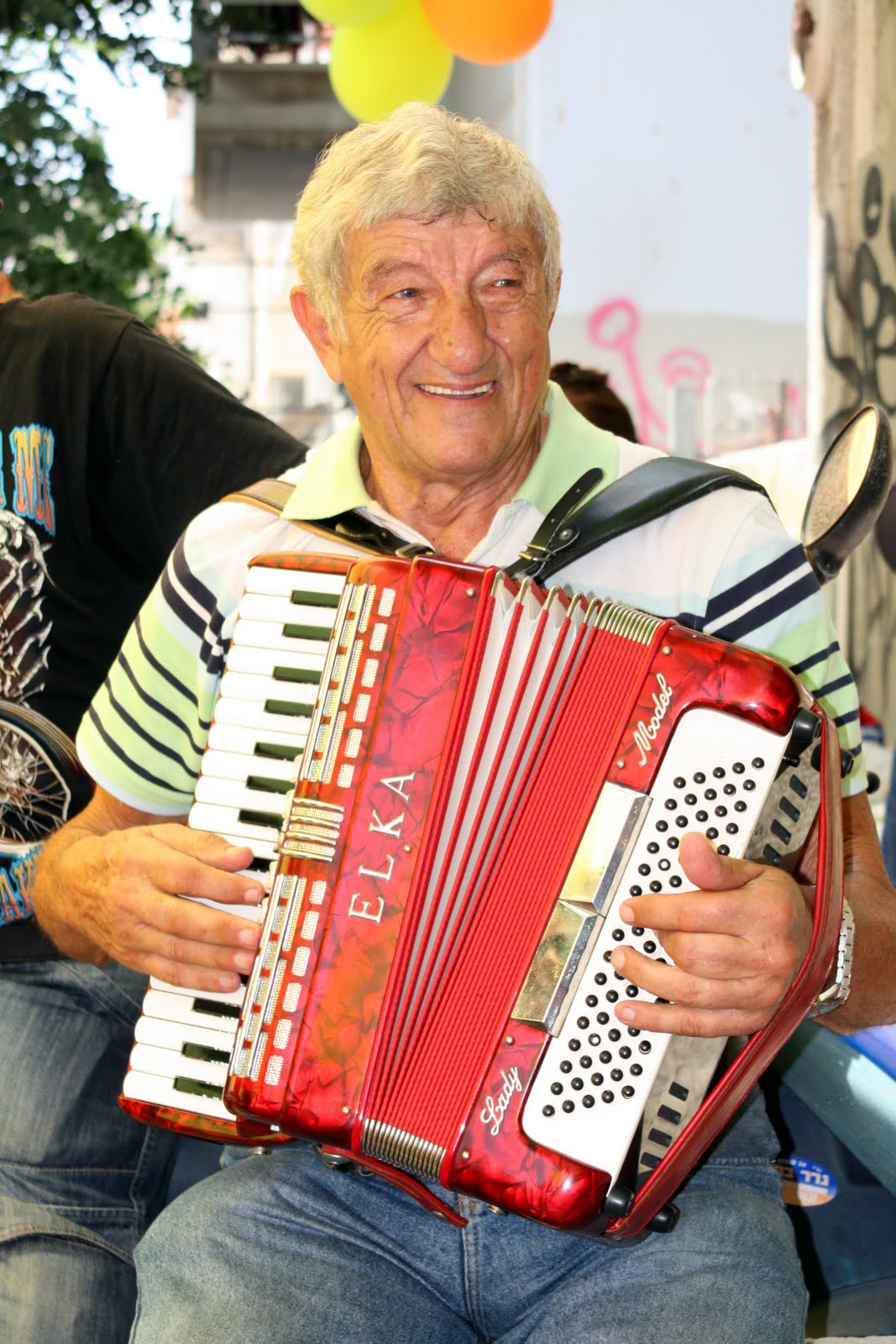
- Albert Salomon, aka "Albert the Bulgarian", 2013
- Born: 21 July 1935; Sofia, Bulgaria
- Died: 20 November 2020 (aged 85); Tel Aviv, Israel
- Other names: Albert the Bulgarian; Albert the Upholsterer; Betona; Betko
- Occupation: Upholsterer
- Years active: 1955–2020
- Known for: singing; playing accordion; social activism

Albert Salomon (Hebrew: אלברט סלומון; 21 July 1935 – 20 November 2020), also known as "Albert the Bulgarian" (Hebrew: אלברט הבולגרי), was a Bulgarian-born Israeli accordionist and social activist. He was also known for aiding the homeless in Tel Aviv for which he was recognized as a beloved resident of the city. Salomon used to throw street parties on a regular basis at his former upholstery shop in Tel Aviv and would invite the homeless under his care to come and attend.

== Biography ==
Albert Salomon was born July 21, 1935, in Sofia, Bulgaria to Jacob and Regina Salomon. He had a younger sister named Beatrice. In 1943, during the Holocaust, Salomon was deported to the Somovit labor camp while many of his family members were murdered. From 1944–1948, Salomon was a member of the "Young Communists" in Bulgaria. During the mass migration in 1948, Salomon immigrated to Israel through Yugoslavia along with his family and settled in Bat Yam and Jaffa where most of the Bulgarian Jews had settled.

During his army service, Salomon served in a minority unit and participated in an ambush against infiltrators from Egypt. Salomon was recognized by the sector commander and also received a letter of recognition from the late president of Israel, Itzhak Ben-Zvi.

Despite having been an accomplished student back in Bulgaria, Salomon was confronted with assimilation difficulties and was forced to help and provide for the family at a young age. He apprenticed in the upholstery trade with his father and worked alongside him in the family-owned business on Merkaz Ba'alei Melacha Street in Tel Aviv. Salomon would go on to inherit his father's business.

Salomon received country-wide recognition for his musical performances while playing the accordion. Salomon knew over 600 folk songs which he sang in Bulgarian, Macedonian, Serbian and Hebrew.

Salomon would go on to be featured in articles, TV and radio talk shows and participated in discussion panels alongside many well-known celebrities such as Alex Ansky, Yossi Alphy, Albert Cohen, Dov Elbaum, Eli Yatzpan, Gidi Gov, Freddy Gruber in addition to being featured in various short films and documentaries.

Albert Salomon died on November 20, 2020, leaving behind three children and seven grandchildren. Hundreds of people attended his funeral.

A month after Salomon's death, a street party was held at his old upholstery shop location in his honor and was attended by street residents, family and friends. A commemorative plaque in his honor was unveiled to the attendees.

In May 2022, his wife of nearly sixty years, Shosh, died and was buried in the couple's plot.

== Social activism ==
Salomon would often take care of the homeless. In the backyard of his upholstery shop compound, Salomon would put up beds, made sure running water and hygiene facilities were in place and provided clothing for his homeless guests. For his work, Salomon was nominated to be recognized as a beloved city resident by Tel Aviv Municipality which claimed that the paperwork was not submitted on time.

At his upholstery shop in Tel Aviv, Salomon would throw street parties on a daily basis every Friday afternoon, where he would play the accordion and put out a spread of food and drinks for the homeless who were invited to attend.

In 2019, following protests against the closure of Jerusalem Avenue in Jaffa, Mayor Ron Huldai was asked about Albert Salomon (Albert the Bulgarian) who used to frequent the avenue and play his accordion. Huldai replied that "Another Bulgarian will come along". In response, Salomon stated that it was hard for him to accept this especially since Huldai was a personal close friend and that he had lived in Tel Aviv since 1948.
