= Ya'akov Nitzani =

Israeli politician (1900–1962)

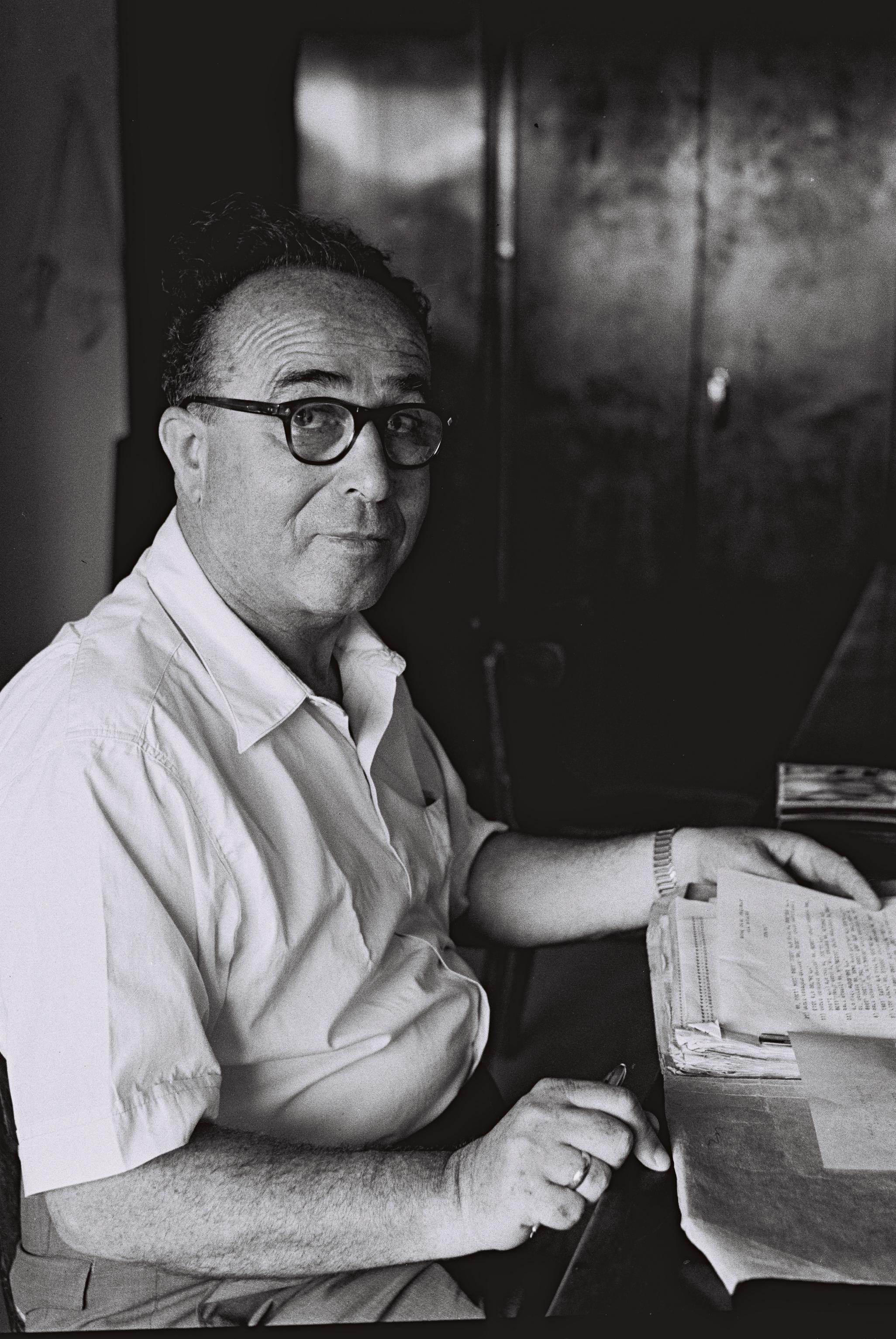
- Nitzani in 1957

Faction represented in the Knesset
- 1952–1959: Mapai

Personal details
- Born: 6 December 1900 Plovdiv, Bulgaria
- Died: 15 September 1962 (aged 61)

Ya'akov Nitzani (Hebrew: יעקב ניצני; 6 December 1900 – 15 September 1962) was an Israeli politician who served as a member of the Knesset for Mapai from 1952 until 1959.

== Biography ==
Born Ya'akov Chechik in Plovdiv, Bulgaria, to a Sephardic Jewish family, Nitzani studied law at the University of Sofia, and also attended a Hebrew teachers seminary. He worked as a teacher from 1920 until 1925, and was a founder of the Organisation for Hebrew Language and Culture. He also helped establish the Bulgarian branches of Hashomer Hatzair and Poale Zion, and was secretary general of the Zionist Organisation in the country.

In 1935 he emigrated to Mandatory Palestine, and became secretary of the Histadrut's Mizrahi Jews department, as well as becoming a member of the trade union's executive committee and the Tel Aviv Workers Council.

A member of the Mapai central committee, he was on the party's list for the 1951 elections, but failed to win a seat. However, he entered the Knesset on 8 December 1952 as a replacement for Yitzhak Ben-Zvi, who had been elected President. He lost his seat in the July 1955 elections, but returned on 14 November the same year as a replacement for Ya'akov Shimshon Shapira, who had resigned from the Knesset following allegations that his involvement in the oil business was inappropriate for a delegate of workers party. Nitzani lost his seat again in the 1959 elections.

He died in 1962 at the age of 61.
