= Binyamin Arditi =

Israeli politician

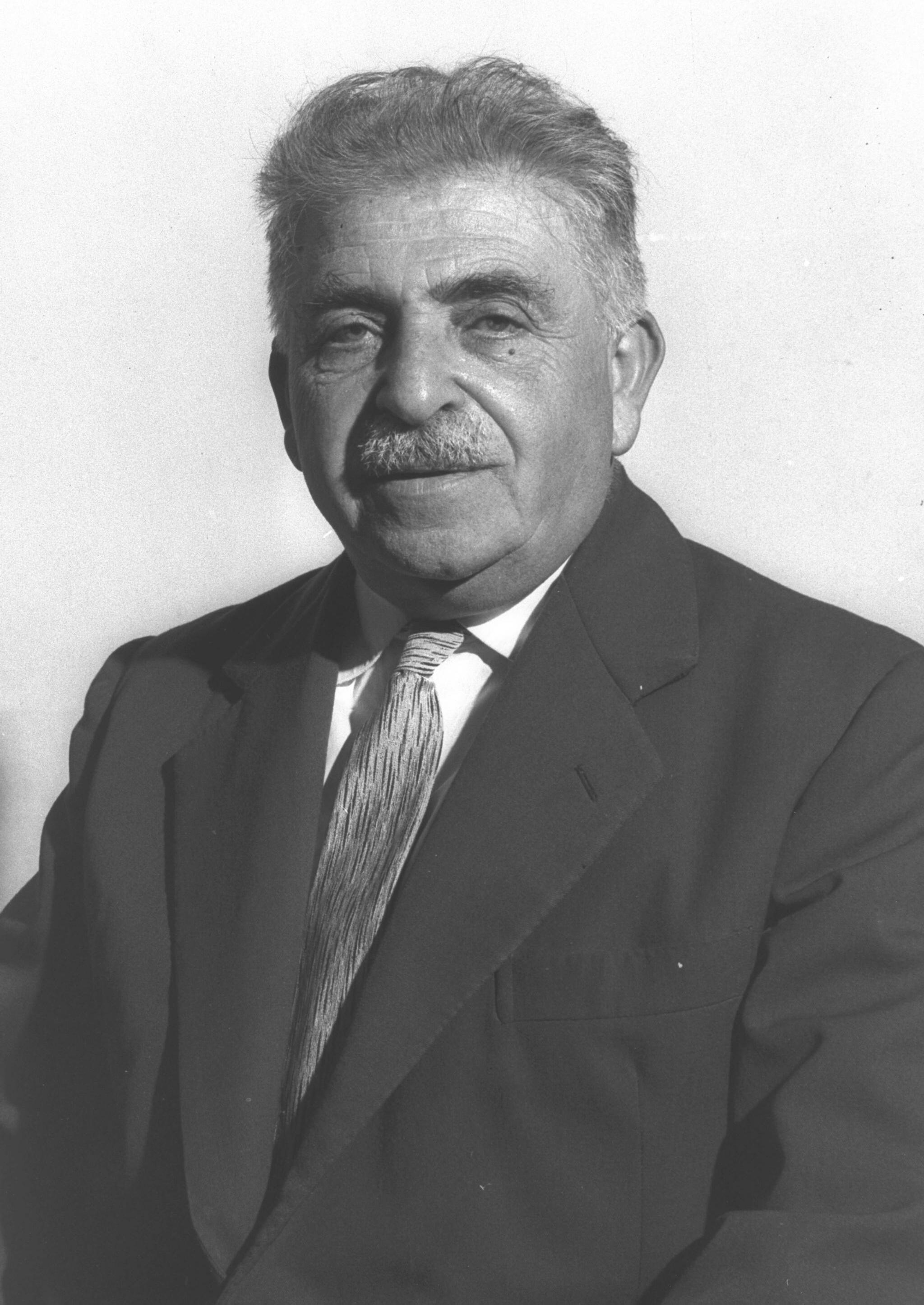
- Arditi in 1959

Faction represented in the Knesset
- 1955–1965: Herut
- 1965: Gahal

Personal details
- Born: 1 July 1897 Vienna, Austria-Hungary
- Died: 20 May 1981 (aged 83)

Binyamin Arditi (Hebrew: בנימין ארדיטי; 1 July 1897 – 20 May 1981) was an Israeli politician who served as a member of the Knesset for Herut and Gahal between 1955 and 1965.

== Biography ==
Born in Vienna, Arditi attended high school in Sofia in Bulgaria. In 1917 he became a member of the central committee of the Zionist Organization of Bulgaria, on which he remained until 1923. He also chaired the organisation's Sofia branch. In 1925 he established the first Bulgarian Revisionist Zionist movement, which he chaired until 1935.

In 1944 he was arrested for Zionist activities, and two years later was arrested again by the communist authorities for encouraging emigration to Palestine. Between 1947 and 1949 he served as the Revisionist Zionism representative in the Bulgarian Eretz Yisrael Office.

In 1949 he emigrated to Israel, where he became a member of the Herut central committee. In 1955 he was elected to the Knesset on the party's list, and was re-elected in 1959 and 1961, before losing his seat in the 1965 elections.

Arditi also published several books; The Role of King Boris in the Expulsion of Bulgarian Jewry (1952), Bulgarian Jews Under the Nazis (1962), Bulgarian Jewry – the Sumla Community (1968) and Famous Bulgarian Jews (1971).

He died in 1981 at the age of 83.
