= Shimon Bejarano =

Israeli industrialist and politician (1910–1971)

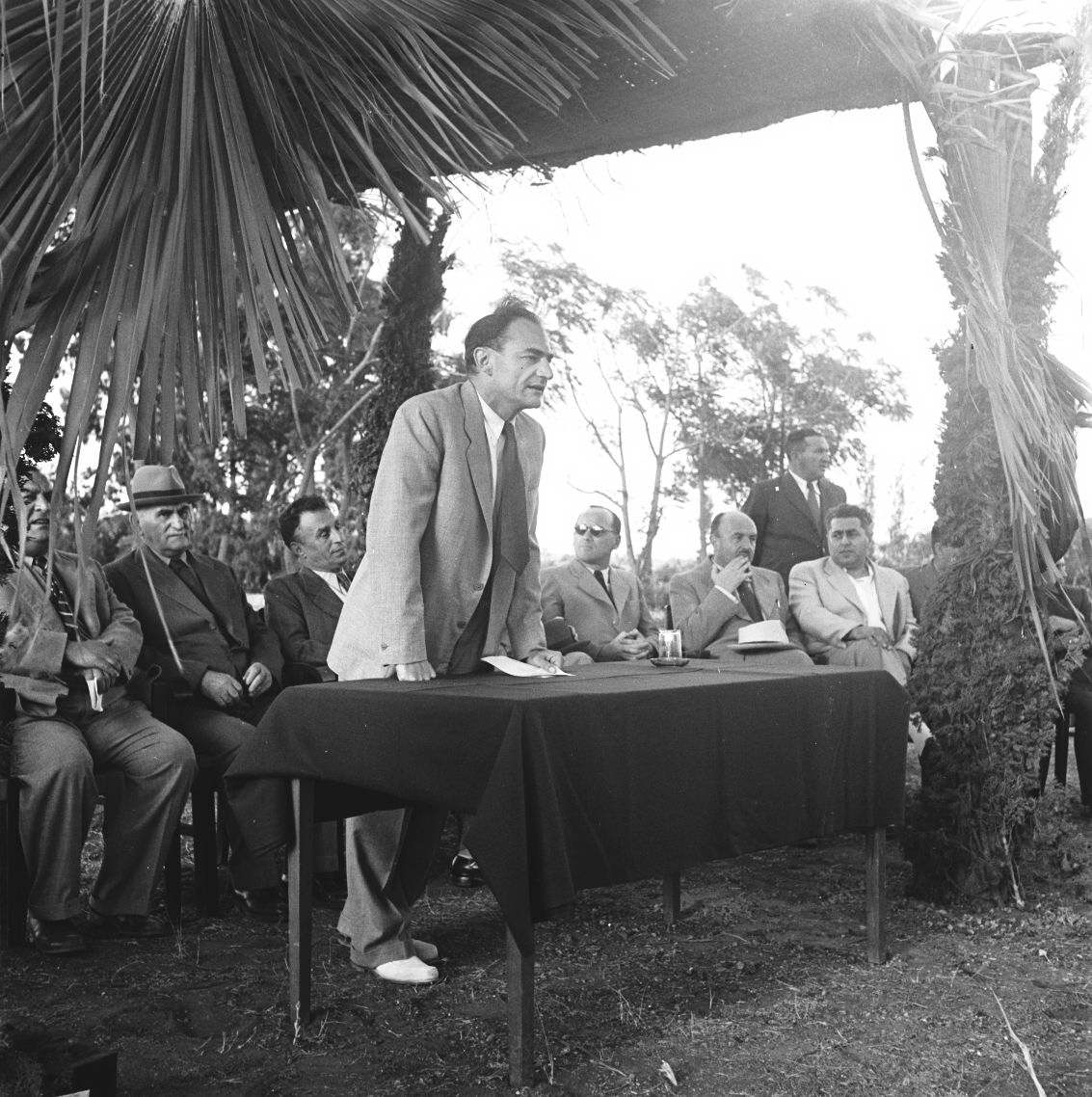
- Bejarano in 1945

Faction represented in the Knesset
- 1951–1959: General Zionists

Personal details
- Born: 28 September 1910; Plovdiv, Bulgaria
- Died: 17 October 1971 (aged 61)

Shimon Bejarano (Hebrew: שמעון בז'רנו; 28 September 1910 – 17 October 1971) was an Israeli industrialist and politician who served as a member of the Knesset for the General Zionists between 1951 and 1959.

== Biography ==
Born in Plovdiv in Bulgaria, Bejarano was educated at the Fraunfeld gymnasium in Switzerland before studying economics at the University of Milan. He emigrated to Mandatory Palestine in 1936. Together with his three brothers he established the Bejarno Bros cigarette factory and Assis Citrus juices and canned fruit plant. A member of Bank Leumi's Board of directors, he was also a member of the advisory board of the Bank of Israel.

Bejarano was a member of the General Zionists and was elected to the Knesset after being placed eighth on the party's list for the 1951 elections. He was re-elected in 1955, but did not stand for re-election in the 1959 elections following the early death of his brothers Joseph and Moshe.

He died in 1971 at the age of 61.
