= Moshe Gueron =

Israeli cardiologist (1926–2017)

Moshe Gueron משה גרון
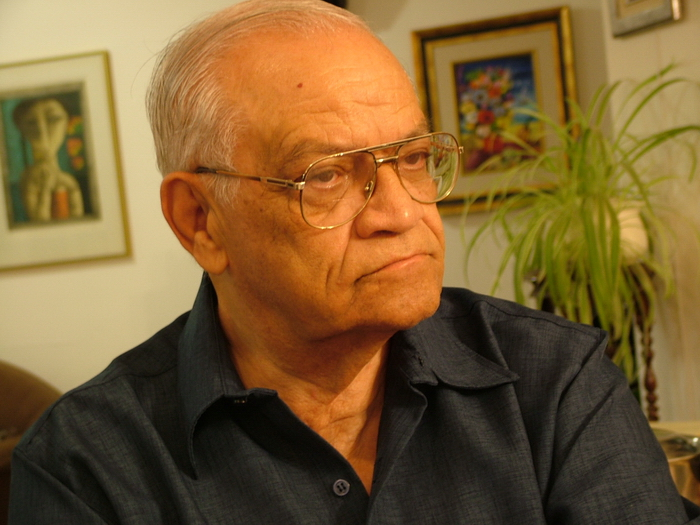
- Moshe Gueron
- Born: 20 March 1926; Sofia, Bulgaria
- Died: 11 December 2017 (aged 91); Beersheba, Israel
- Burial place: Beer Sheva New Cemetery, Israel
- Education: Hebrew University of Jerusalem, University of Cincinnati, Soroka Medical Center, Hadassah Hospital Tel Aviv.
- Known for: Performing the first successful Cardiac catheterization in Israel. First worldwide research about cardiovascular manifestations of severe scorpion sting.
- Medical career
- Profession: Cardiologist and researcher
- Institutions: Soroka Medical Center; University of Cincinnati; Hadassah Hospital Tel Aviv; Donolo Hospital in Jaffa; Tel Hashomer Hospital
- Sub-specialties: Cardiovascular diseases

Moshe Yitzhak Gueron (Hebrew: משה יצחק גרון; born 20 March 1926 – 11 December 2017) was an Israeli physician and researcher, innovator, scientist, medical educator, Professor of Cardiology at the Medical School for International Health at Ben-Gurion University of the Negev, a pioneer in the field of Cardiology. He founded and managed the Division of Cardiology in the Soroka Medical Center for 30 years. His research and clinical works gained broad international recognition. Gueron played a central role in developing global medicine, and he is mainly known for his work on the treatment of heart patients with cardiovascular manifestations of severe scorpion sting.

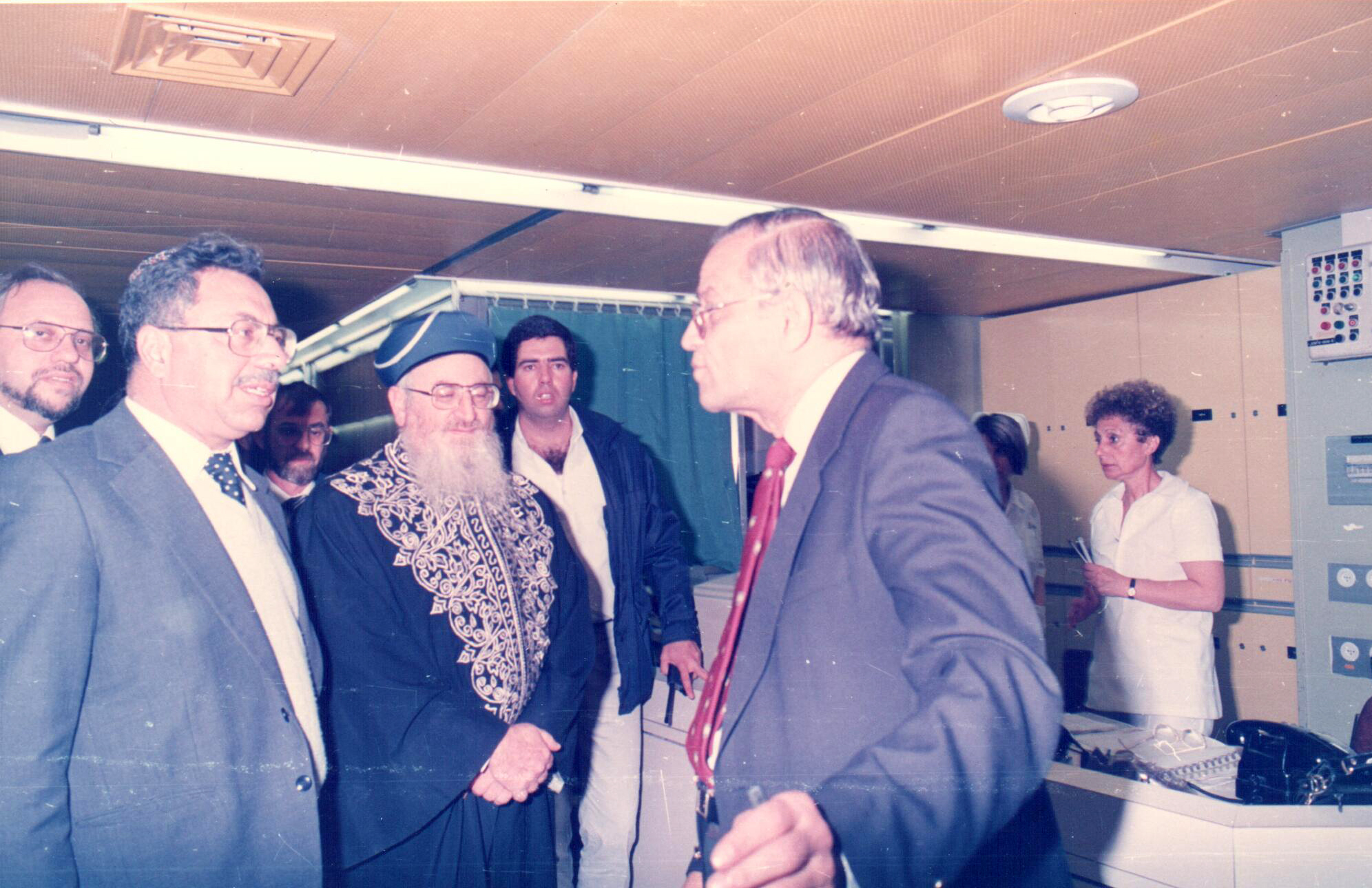
Gueron and Rabbi Mordechai Eliyahu, July 1994.

== Medical career ==
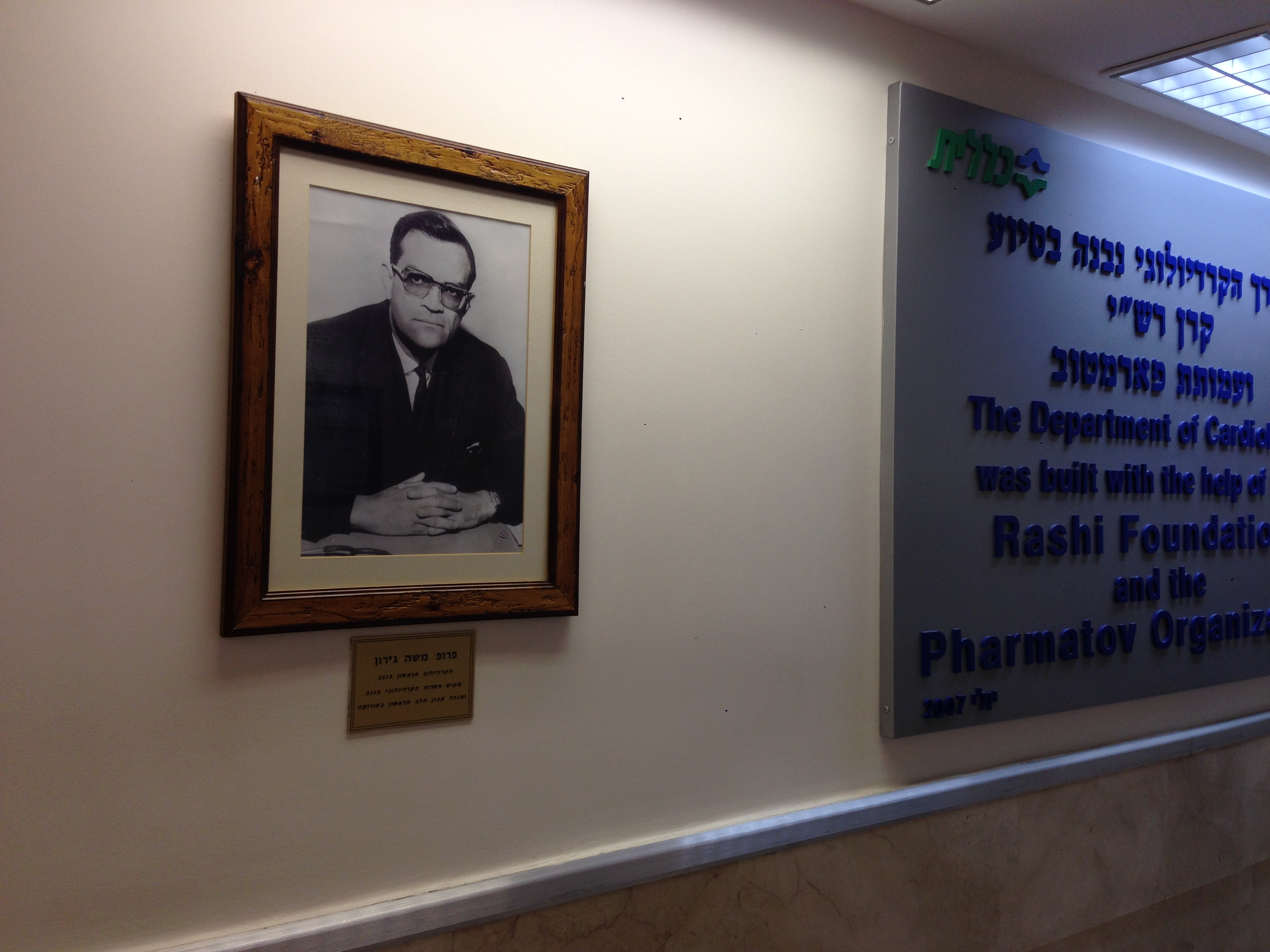
Gueron's portrait in the Division of Cardiology in Soroka Medical Center.

Gueron was appointed Professor at Soroka Medical Center in 1967, and was involved in the development of the techniques of heart and heart-lung treatment. Gueron is best known for research he has managed regarding the treatment of scorpion envenomation and its effect on the human heart. Gueron and colleagues conducted a study in which thirty-four patients with severe scorpion sting were reviewed and pertinent data related to the cardiovascular system, such as hypertension, peripheral vascular collapse, congestive heart failure or pulmonary edema, were analyzed. The electrocardiograms of 28 patients were reviewed, 14 patients showed "early myocardial infarction-like" pattern. The urinary catecholamine metabolites were investigated in 12 patients with scorpion sting. Vanylmandelic acid was elevated in seven patients and the total free epinephrine and norepinephrine in eight. Six of these 12 patients displayed the electrocardiographic "myocardial infarction-like" pattern. Nine patients died and the pathologic lesions of the myocardium were reviewed in seven. The anticipated time line is within three years depending on successful animal trials. Gueron was described hypertension, pulmonary oedema with hypertension, hypotension, pulmonary oedema with hypotension and rhythm disturbances as five different syndromes that may dominate the clinical picture in scorpion sting victim. He suggested that all patients with cardiac symptoms should be admitted to an intensive cardiac unit. Gueron was questioned regarding the value of giving antivenom, and he replied that although it is freely available, all cases of scorpion sting are treated without it, and there had not been a single fatality in 1989. In 1990, he reported poor contractility with low ejection fraction, decreased systolic left ventricular performance, lowered fractional percentage shortening observed in echocardiographic and radionuclide angiographic study. Gueron and colleagues' research suggested antivenom had no beneficial effect in patients with severe scorpion sting.

Gueron started to engage in cardiac muscle-related events in patients at the advice of Wilhelmina Cohen, the then-director and founder of Soroka's Pediatric Division, who while treating a young Bedouin boy who was stung by a deathstalker, discovered symptoms of shock, ventricular arrhythmias and ventricular tachycardia. Research by Gueron and his team found that yellow scorpion venom evokes potent cardiovascular responses in humans. Further work by Gueron and colleagues on treatments for and severity of scorpion stings were published in international medical journals.

== Retirement ==
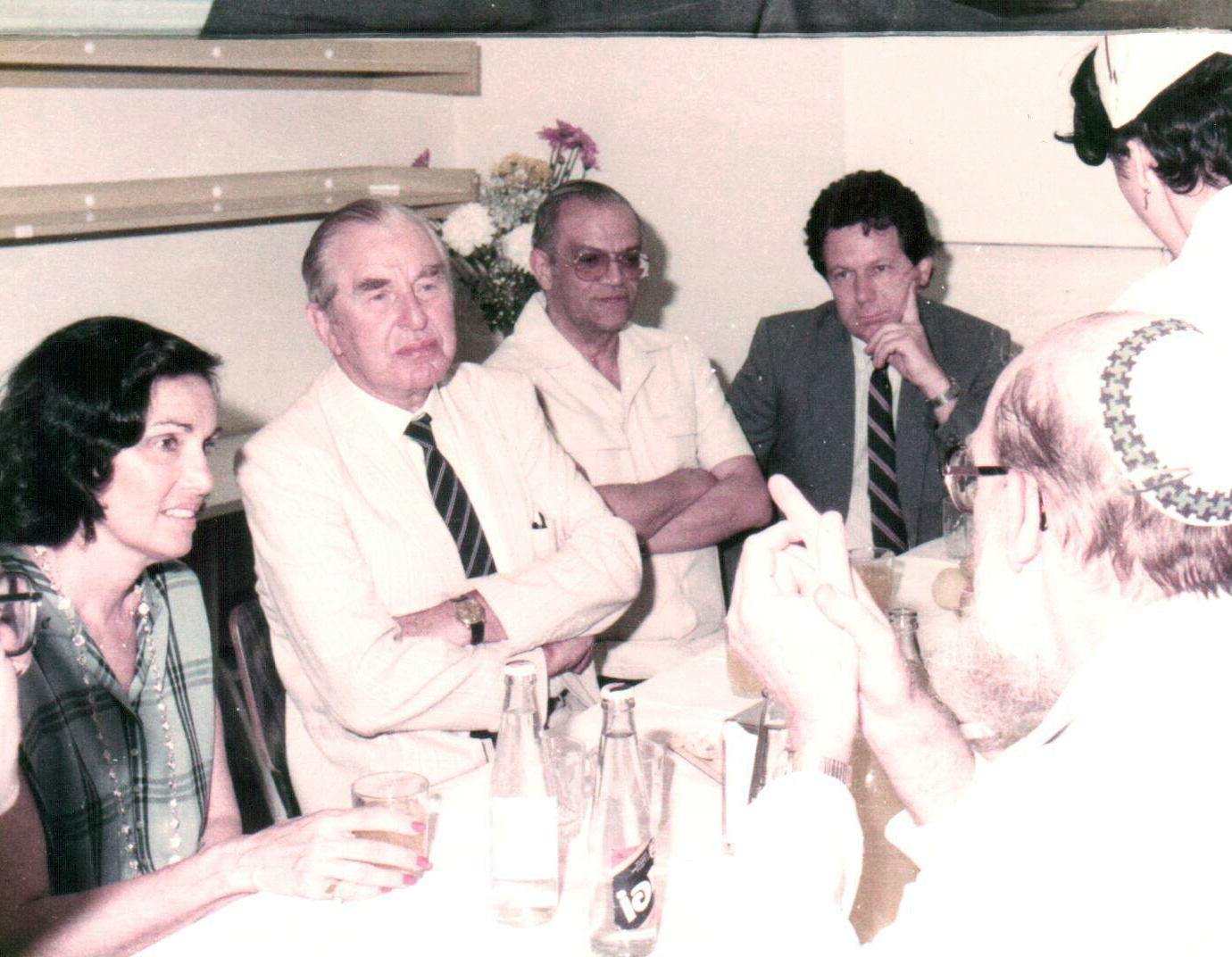
Gueron (middle) sitting with sixth President of Israel Chaim Herzog and Prof. Shimon Glick (shown from his back) in Soroka Medical Center, 1989

Gueron was employed by Soroka Medical Center from 1962 until 1992 and operated on more than 100,000 patients. Having retired from performing cardiology at the age of 67, he continued to act as a consultant.

== Publications ==
- Gueron, Mosche; Yaron, Rema (1970). "Cardiovascular Manifestations of Severe Scorpion Sting". Chest. 57 (2): 156–162. doi:10.1378/chest.57.2.156. PMID 5411717.
- Sofer, Shaul; Weinhouse, Elliott; Tal, Asher; Wanderman, Kenneth L.; Margulis, Giora; Leiberman, Alberto; Gueron, Moshe (1988). "Cor Pulmonale Due to Adenoidal or Tonsillar Hypertrophy or Both in Children". Chest. 93 (1): 119–122. doi:10.1378/chest.93.1.119. PMID 3335141.
- Gueron, Mosche; Ilia, Reuben; Margulia, Giora (2000). "Arthropod poisons and the cardiovascular system". The American Journal of Emergency Medicine. 18 (6): 708–714. doi:10.1053/ajem.2000.9265. PMID 11043628.
- Ilia, Reuben; Rosenshtein, Gabriel; Marc Weinstein, Jean; Cafri, Carlos; Abu-Ful, Akram; Gueron, Mosche (2001). "Left anterior descending artery length in left and right coronary artery dominance". Coronary Artery Disease. 12 (1): 77–78. doi:10.1097/00019501-200102000-00011. PMID 11211170. S2CID 24911603.
