= Ya'akov Nehoshtan =

Israeli politician and diplomat (1925–2019)

- יעקב נחושתן
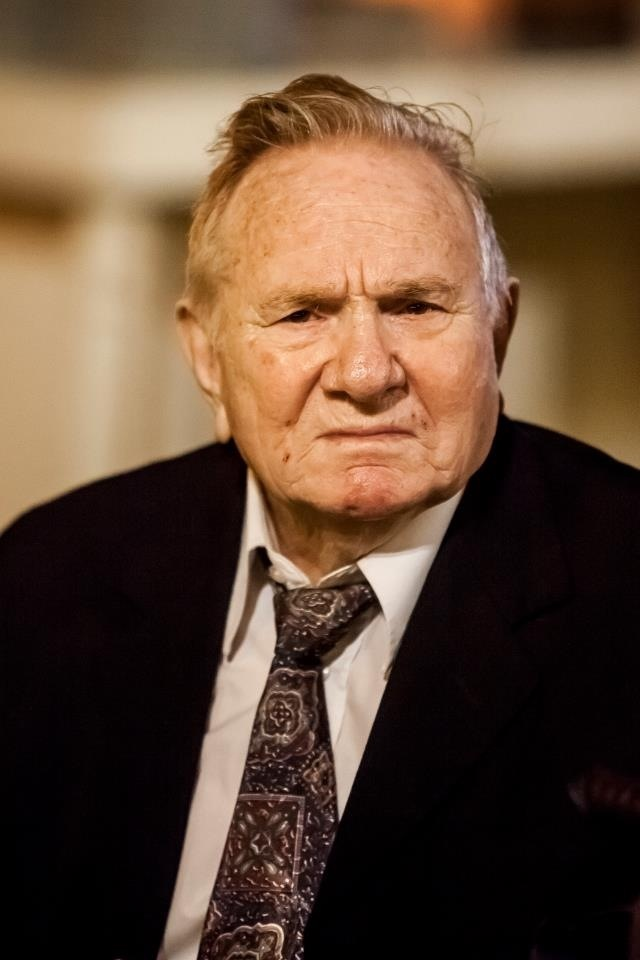

Faction represented in the Knesset
- 1969–1974: Gahal

Other roles
- 1982–1985: Ambassador to the Netherlands

Personal details
- Born: 22 April 1925; Kazanlak, Bulgaria
- Died: 17 April 2019 (aged 93)

Ya'akov Nehoshtan (Hebrew: יעקב נחושתן; 22 April 1925 – 17 April 2019) was an Israeli politician and diplomat. He served as a member of the Knesset for Gahal between 1969 and 1974 and as ambassador to the Netherlands between 1982 and 1985.

== Biography ==
Born in Kazanlak, Bulgaria, Nehoshtan attended high school in Vratsa and was a member of the Hashomer Hatzair youth group. He made aliyah to Mandatory Palestine in 1944, and studied law at the Hebrew University of Jerusalem, gaining certification as a lawyer. He joined the Irgun in 1944, and was arrested by the British authorities the following year and exiled to a detention camp in Eritrea. In 1947 he was moved to a camp in Kenya.

In 1948 he was amongst the founders of Herut. He became chairman of the party's Jerusalem branch in 1968, and the following year was elected to the Knesset on the Gahal list (an alliance of Herut and the Liberal Party). He lost his seat in the 1973 elections.

In 1979 he was appointed Deputy Chief of Mission at the Embassy of Israel in Washington, D.C. and in 1982 became ambassador to the Netherlands, a post he held until 1985.

Nehoshtan died on 17 April 2019, at the age of 93.

His son, Ido, served as commander of the Israeli Air Force.
