= Council of Ministers (People's Republic of Bulgaria) =

- Министерски съвет

Agency overview
- Formed: 20 August 1949
- Dissolved: 23 October 1989
- Superseding agency: Modern government
- Jurisdiction: People's Republic of Bulgaria
- Headquarters: Sofia

Council of Ministers of the People’s Republic of Bulgaria (Bulgarian: Министерски съвет на Народна република България) was the supreme executive and administrative organ responsible for the executive and administrative management of Bulgaria during the socialist period, broadly from the establishment of the People’s Republic of Bulgaria in 1946 until the transition away from communist rule in 1989–1990. Its constitutional role changed over time, but it remained the principal organ through which state policy was translated into administration, economic planning, budgeting, and governmental regulation. While the Council of Ministers was the formal state-government institution, the Bulgarian Communist Party was the leading political organization of the socialist system. The 1971 Constitution explicitly stated that the BCP was the "guiding force in society and the state". Consequently, the formal constitutional structure does not by itself describe how political decisions were actually made.

== History ==
Between the 1934 coup and the adoption of the Constitution of the People's Republic of Bulgaria on December 4, 1947, the composition and structure of the Council of Ministers underwent frequent changes: it expanded and was reorganized; new ministries were created, while others were renamed, merged, or split; and during the administration of Konstantin Muraviev, a new position—Minister without Portfolio—was established.

On November 21, 1946, at a session of the 4th Grand National Assembly, Prime Minister Kimon Georgiev announced the government's intention to resign.

On the same day, the Prime Minister submitted his cabinet's resignation to the Presidium of the People's Republic; the resignation was accepted, and Georgi Dimitrov—leader of the BRP, the party victorious in the elections—was tasked with forming the next cabinet and granted an unlimited mandate. On November 22, Dimitrov presented the composition of his cabinet to the Presidium, and it was approved. On November 28, the Prime Minister read his government's program to the deputies, and it was unanimously approved.

The office of Deputy Chairman of the Council of Ministers was also established in 1946.

The Constitution adopted on December 4, 1947, introduced new structural changes to the composition of the Council of Ministers; under Article 39, its members included—in addition to the Chairman, the Deputy Chairmen, and the ministers (whose number was set at 17)—the Chairman of the State Planning Commission, the Chairman of the State Control Commission, and the Chairman of the Committee for Science, Art, and Culture.

On July 3, 1949, Georgi Dimitrov died at the Barvikha sanatorium near the Soviet capital, Moscow, following a long and severe illness. The medical report on his death stated that the Prime Minister had suffered from diabetes and liver problems. On July 6, Dimitrov's body arrived in Sofia and was placed in a mausoleum specially erected for him. On July 19, an extraordinary session of the Grand National Assembly was convened, during which Rayko Damyanov, Chairman of the Assembly's Bureau, formally announced Dimitrov's death in accordance with Articles 39 and 40 of the Constitution and proposed adding the election of a Prime Minister to the agenda—a proposal that was approved. On July 20, BCP deputy Mincho Minchev nominated Vasil Kolarov for the post; his candidacy was unanimously approved via open vote, and changes to the government were also ratified.

On January 18, Ferdinand Kozovski read out a proposal to the deputies—signed by BCP members Ivan Pashov and Vlasi Vlasovski, and BZNS members Nikolay Georgiev and Stoyan Tonchev—calling for the National Assembly to once again task Vasil Kolarov with forming a government. The proposal was unanimously approved, and on January 19, after the Prime Minister presented his ministers, the cabinet was confirmed without objection. Vasil Kolarov died five days later, on January 23, 1950. The medical report on his death cited "heart failure" as the cause, noting that he had suffered a heart attack earlier that month.

The second regular session of the National Assembly opened on February 1, 1950. Mincho Neychev, Chairman of the Presidium of the National Assembly, proposed—on behalf of the BCP and BZNS parliamentary groups—that Valko Chervenkov be elected Prime Minister. His candidacy was unanimously approved. The fifth extraordinary session of the National Assembly opened on April 16, 1956. The following day, the session's presiding officer, Georgi Atanasov (Deputy Chairman of the National Assembly Bureau), announced that the Bureau had received a letter from Valko Chervenkov requesting to be relieved of his post as Chairman of the Council of Ministers.

The proposal by the Bureau of the National Assembly to relieve Chervenkov of his duties was unanimously adopted by the deputies; subsequently, on behalf of the BCP Central Committee, the Standing Bureau of the National Council of the Fatherland Front, and the parliamentary groups of the BCP and the BZNS, MP Todor Zhivkov proposed Anton Yugov as the new Chairman of the Council of Ministers. His proposal was unanimously approved, and changes to the government were also voted through.

On November 19, 1962, the second regular session of the 4th National Assembly opened, during which Dimitar Ganev, Chairman of the Presidium of the National Assembly, read out a proposal—on behalf of the BCP and BZNS parliamentary groups—to relieve Yugov of his post as head of government.

== Powers and duties ==
The Council was responsible for coordinating the ministries, implementing the national economic plan and state budget, maintaining public order, protecting state interests, directing foreign policy and providing general direction for national defense. The Constitution also allowed it to create commissions, committees, councils, directorates and other bodies directly subordinate to it.

Article 98 of the 1971 constitution defined the Council of Ministers as the supreme executive and administrative organ of state power. It possessed formal legal authority to issue government acts. Under Article 104 of the 1971 Constitution, it adopted resolutions (Bulgarian: постановления), directives (Bulgarian: разпореждания) and Decisions (Bulgarian: решения).

== Composition ==
Article 99 of the 1971 Constitution specified that the Council of Ministers consisted of:

- Chairman of the Council of Ministers;
- Deputy Chairmen;
- Ministers
- Heads of institutions possessing the rank of ministries.

=== Chairman ===
The Chairman served as the head of government was the central coordinating figure within the Council. Formally, the National Assembly elected the Chairman and, on his proposal, elected the deputy chairmen and other members of the government. The Chairman coordinated the activities of the ministries and the work of the Council as a whole. In practice, however, the political importance of a particular chairman depended heavily upon his position within the Communist Party. During the Zhivkov period, for example, the distinction between party leadership and state-government leadership could become especially blurred because the same senior figures could occupy leading positions in both structures.

- Fatherland Front

Portrait	Name (Birth–Death)	Term of office			Party	Government Composition	Election	Head of State (Tenure)
Portrait	Name (Birth–Death)	Took office	Left office	Time in office	Party	Government Composition	Election	Head of State (Tenure)
Chairmen of the Council of Ministers 1946–1990
	Kimon Georgiev (1882–1969)	15 September 1946	23 November 1946	69 days	Zveno	64. Georgiev III; Zveno–BKP–BZNS–RP–BRSDP	—	Vasil Kolarov (1946–1947)
	Georgi Dimitrov (1882–1949)	23 November 1946	2 July 1949†	2 years, 221 days	Bulgarian Communist Party	65. Dimitrov I; 66. Dimitrov II; BKP–Zveno–BZNS–BRSDP	1946	Vasil Kolarov (1946–1947)
	Georgi Dimitrov (1882–1949)	23 November 1946	2 July 1949†	2 years, 221 days	Bulgarian Communist Party	65. Dimitrov I; 66. Dimitrov II; BKP–Zveno–BZNS–BRSDP	1946	Mincho Neychev (1947–1950)
	Vasil Kolarov (1877–1950)	2 July 1949; Acting until 20 July 1949	23 January 1950†	205 days	Bulgarian Communist Party	67. Kolarov I; 68. Kolarov II; BKP–BZNS	1949	Mincho Neychev (1947–1950)
	Valko Chervenkov (1900–1980)	23 January 1950; Acting until 3 February 1950	17 April 1956	6 years, 85 days	Bulgarian Communist Party	69. Chervenkov; BKP–BZNS	1953	Mincho Neychev (1947–1950)
	Valko Chervenkov (1900–1980)	23 January 1950; Acting until 3 February 1950	17 April 1956	6 years, 85 days	Bulgarian Communist Party	69. Chervenkov; BKP–BZNS	1953	Georgi Damyanov (1950–1958)
	Anton Yugov (1904–1991)	17 April 1956	19 November 1962	6 years, 216 days	Bulgarian Communist Party	70. Yugov I; 71. Yugov II; 72. Yugov III; BKP–BZNS	1957	Georgi Damyanov (1950–1958)
	Anton Yugov (1904–1991)	17 April 1956	19 November 1962	6 years, 216 days	Bulgarian Communist Party	70. Yugov I; 71. Yugov II; 72. Yugov III; BKP–BZNS	1957	Dimitar Ganev (1958–1964)
	Todor Zhivkov (1911–1998)	19 November 1962	7 July 1971	8 years, 230 days	Bulgarian Communist Party	73. Zhivkov I; 74. Zhivkov II; BKP–BZNS	1962; 1966	Dimitar Ganev (1958–1964)
	Todor Zhivkov (1911–1998)	19 November 1962	7 July 1971	8 years, 230 days	Bulgarian Communist Party	73. Zhivkov I; 74. Zhivkov II; BKP–BZNS	1962; 1966	Georgi Traykov (1964–1971)
	Stanko Todorov (1920–1996)	7 July 1971	16 June 1981	9 years, 344 days	Bulgarian Communist Party	75. Todorov I; 76. Todorov II; BKP–BZNS	1971; 1976	Todor Zhivkov (1971–1989)
	Grisha Filipov (1919–1994)	16 June 1981	21 March 1986	4 years, 278 days	Bulgarian Communist Party	77. Filipov; BKP–BZNS	1981	Todor Zhivkov (1971–1989)
	Georgi Atanasov (1933–2022)	21 March 1986	3 February 1990	3 years, 319 days	Bulgarian Communist Party	78. Atanasov; BKP–BZNS	1986	Todor Zhivkov (1971–1989)
	Georgi Atanasov (1933–2022)	21 March 1986	3 February 1990	3 years, 319 days	Bulgarian Communist Party	78. Atanasov; BKP–BZNS	1986	Petar Mladenov (1989–1990)
	Andrey Lukanov (1938–1996)	3 February 1990	15 November 1990	285 days	Bulgarian Communist Party	79. Lukanov I; 80. Lukanov II	1986	Petar Mladenov (1989–1990)
	Andrey Lukanov (1938–1996)	3 February 1990	15 November 1990	285 days	Bulgarian Socialist Party	79. Lukanov I; 80. Lukanov II	1986	Zhelyu Zhelev (1990)

== See also ==
- Council of Ministers of the Hungarian People's Republic
