= Second Dimitrov Government =

Government of Bulgaria (1947–1949)

- 66th Cabinet of Bulgaria
- 1947–1949
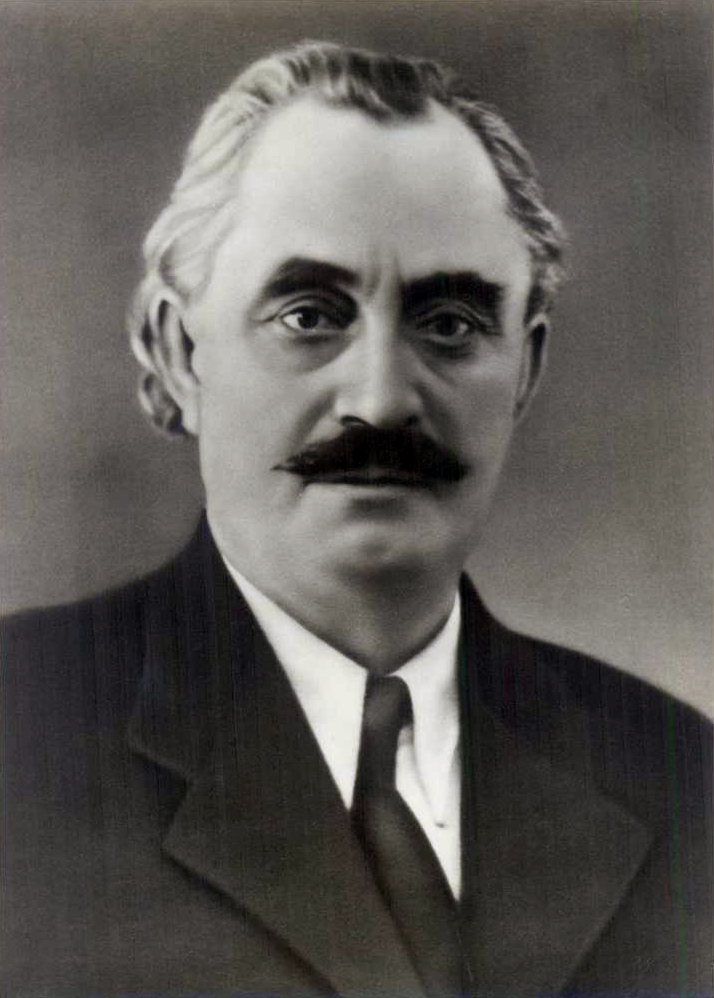
- Date formed: 12 December 1947
- Date dissolved: 20 July 1949

People and organisations
- Chairman of the CM: Georgi Dimitrov
- No. of ministers: 19
- Member parties: OF (BKP & BZNS)

History
- Election: 27 October 1946
- Outgoing election: 18 December 1949
- Predecessor: Dimitrov I
- Successor: Kolarov I

The second government of Georgi Dimitrov was the sixty-sixth government of the People's Republic of Bulgaria, appointed by the Grand National Assembly on December 12, 1947. It governed the country until July 20, 1949, after which it was succeeded by the first and second governments of Vasil Kolarov.

== Politics ==
=== Domestic Policy ===
==== 1947 ====
On December 23, 1947, the VI Grand National Assembly passed the "Law on the Nationalization of Private Industrial and Mining Enterprises." The state took control of 1,997 larger and 4,027 smaller industrial enterprises. On December 27 of the same year, all private banks were nationalized. The following year, cooperative sugar factories and cooperative electro-mining enterprises, private saltworks, mills, oil presses, dryers, as well as ships with a tonnage over 40 tons, were transferred to the state sector. The cabinet encouraged peasants to join cooperative farms. Private policing was banned. The Law on the Redemption of Large Agricultural Inventory from Private Owners was enacted, and mandatory state deliveries were introduced. Cooperativization and the development of heavy industry were defined by the Fifth Congress of the Bulgarian Communist Party (1948) as the "general line for the development (Bulgaria)'s economy." By that time, only 4% of arable land was in Agricultural Cooperative Societies.

==== 1947–1949 ====
The Social Democratic Party merged with the Bulgarian Communist Party (1948), while "Zveno" and the Radical Democratic Party self-dissolved (1949).

The cabinet began a comprehensive reform (Bulgaria)n education. In 1948, all foreign schools in Bulgaria were closed. A few months later, the National Assembly passed the "Law on Public Education," whose main goal was the "comprehensive physical and spiritual development of children in the spirit of socialism." Religious education was abolished. In higher education institutions, 20% of the places for newly enrolled students were reserved for the children of active fighters. The Bulgarian Academy of Sciences came under government control. A series of disciplines based on the dominant Marxist ideology were introduced in higher education. The activities of the partisan organizations "Chavdar," "Septemvriyche," and Komsomol expanded. From the end of 1948, the management of education was carried out through joint decrees of the Central Committee of the Bulgarian Communist Party and the government, which was another stage in the implementation of the communists' overall tactic of merging party and state. The Grand National Assembly extended its mandate twice and continued to be the supreme organ of power. In February 1949, the "Law on People's Councils" was adopted, regulating, in a Soviet manner, the composition and powers of local authorities.

=== Foreign Policy ===
In its foreign policy, the government continued the line started in 1944 of aligning with the USSR (Treaty of Friendship, Cooperation, and Mutual Assistance - March 18, 1948). The proposal for aid and investment from the USA (Marshall Plan) was rejected. Tensions between the USSR and Yugoslavia (which accepted American aid and sought to pursue an independent policy) led to the closure (Bulgaria)'s western border. The Eastern Bloc formed an economic organization, the Council for Mutual Economic Assistance, in January 1949.

Following the death of Prime Minister Georgi Dimitrov on July 2, 1949, a new cabinet was formed under Vasil Kolarov.

== Composition ==
The cabinet, headed by Georgi Dimitrov, was composed of political figures from the Fatherland Front.

=== Cabinet ===
The cabinet consisted of the following 22 ministers and one chairman:

Portfolio	Minister	Took office	Left office	Party
Chairman of the Council of Ministers	Georgi Dimitrov	December 12, 1947	July 20, 1949	Bulgarian Communist Party
Deputy Chairman of the Council of Ministers	Traicho Kostov	December 12, 1947	July 20, 1949	Bulgarian Communist Party
Deputy Chairman of the Council of Ministers, Minister of Foreign Affairs	Vasil Kolarov	December 12, 1947	July 20, 1949	Bulgarian Communist Party
Deputy Prime Minister, Electrification and Reclamation	Kimon Georgiev	December 12, 1947	July 20, 1949	Zveno
Deputy Prime Minister, Agriculture and Forestry	Georgi Traykov	December 12, 1947	July 20, 1949	Bulgarian Agrarian National Union
Minister of Agriculture	Georgi Traykov	December 19, 1948	July 20, 1949	Bulgarian Agrarian National Union
Minister of Forestry	Georgi Popov	December 19, 1948	July 20, 1949	Bulgarian Workers' Social Democratic Party
Deputy Prime Minister	Georgi Popov	December 12, 1947	July 20, 1949	Bulgarian Workers' Social Democratic Party
Chairman of the State Planning Commission	Dobri Terpeshev	December 12, 1947	July 20, 1949	Bulgarian Communist Party
Chairman of the State Control Commission	Georgi Chankov	December 12, 1947	July 20, 1949	Bulgarian Communist Party
Chairman of the Committee for Science, Art and Culture	Valko Chervenkov	December 12, 1947	July 20, 1949	Bulgarian Communist Party
Minister of Internal Affairs	Anton Yugov	December 12, 1947	July 20, 1949	Bulgarian Communist Party
Minister of Education	Kiril Dramaliev	December 12, 1947	July 20, 1949	Bulgarian Communist Party
Minister of Finance	Ivan Stefanov	December 12, 1947	July 20, 1949	Bulgarian Communist Party
Minister of Justice	Radi Naydenov	December 12, 1947	July 20, 1949	Bulgarian Agrarian National Union
Minister of National Defense	Georgi Damyanov	December 12, 1947	July 20, 1949	Bulgarian Communist Party
Minister of Trade and Food	Krastyu Dobreff	December 12, 1947	July 20, 1949	Bulgarian Communist Party
Minister of Foreign Trade	Dimitar Ganev	November 5, 1948	July 20, 1949	Bulgarian Communist Party
Minister of Internal Trade	Krastyu Dobreff	November 5, 1948	July 20, 1949	Bulgarian Communist Party
Minister of Construction and Roads	Manol Sakelarov	December 12, 1947	July 20, 1949	Bulgarian Communist Party
Minister of Municipal Economy and Urban Planning	Petar Kamenov	December 12, 1947	July 20, 1949	Bulgarian Communist Party
Minister of Railways, Roads and Waterways	Stefan Tonchev	December 12, 1947	July 20, 1949	Bulgarian Agrarian National Union
Minister of Posts, Telegraphs and Telephones	Tsola Dragoycheva	December 12, 1947	July 20, 1949	Bulgarian Communist Party
Minister of Industry and Crafts	Petko Kunin	December 12, 1947	July 20, 1949	Bulgarian Communist Party
Minister of Mines and Underground Wealth	Vasil Pavurdzhiev	December 12, 1947	July 20, 1949	BZNS
Minister of Mines and Underground Wealth	Kiril Klisurski	January 5, 1948	July 20, 1949	Bulgarian Agrarian National Union
Minister of Public Health	Traicho Dobroslavski	December 12, 1947	July 20, 1949	Zveno
Minister of Labor and Social Care	Zdravko Mitovski	December 12, 1947	July 20, 1949	Bulgarian Workers' Social Democratic Party

=== Changes in the Cabinet ===
==== from November 30, 1948 ====
- The Ministry of Trade and Food is divided into the Ministry of Internal Trade and the Ministry of Foreign Trade by Decree No. 1652 of .

==== from March 31, 1949 ====
- On December 6, 1948, a meeting was held in Moscow between Stalin and a Bulgarian party delegation, at which Stalin accused Traicho Kostov of concealing economic information from Soviet representatives in Bulgaria. On March 26-27, 1949, a plenum of the Central Committee of the Bulgarian Communist Party (BKP) was held, at which it was decided that Traicho Kostov should be removed from power. On March 31 of the same year, he was removed from the Politburo and from the post of Deputy Prime Minister.

==== from July 20, 1949 ====
- On July 2, 1949, Prime Minister Georgi Dimitrov dies. After consultations with Stalin, on July 15 of the same year, the Politburo of the Central Committee of the Bulgarian Communist Party (BKP) decides that the People's Council of the National Front (VNS) should elect Vasil Kolarov as Prime Minister, but due to his illness, he should be provided with "absolute rest" for two months. On July 20 of the same year, Vasil Kolarov is elected Prime Minister, and as his deputies:

== Events ==
=== 1947 ===
- December 23, 1947 - The VI Grand National Assembly votes on the "Law on the Nationalization of Private Industrial and Mining Enterprises".
- December 27, 1947 - All private banks in the country are nationalized.

=== 1948 ===
- March 18, 1948 - A treaty of friendship, cooperation, and mutual assistance is signed between Bulgaria and the USSR.
- December 6, 1948 - A meeting is held in Moscow between Stalin and a Bulgarian party delegation, at which Stalin accuses Traicho Kostov of concealing economic information from Soviet representatives in Bulgaria.

=== 1949 ===
- July 2, 1949 - Prime Minister (the leader (Bulgaria)) Georgi Dimitrov dies. On July 20, 1949, Vasil Kolarov was elected Prime Minister.

== See also ==
- First Dimitrov Government

== Bibliography ==
- Bulgarian Political Leaders 1879–1994. IK "Heraclitus A & N". 1994. ISBN 954-573-005-6.

Government offices
Preceded by Dimitrov I	Governments of Bulgaria	Succeeded by Kolarov I
