= Ekaterina Avramova (politician) =

Bulgarian sociologist, writer and politician

Member of the National Assembly
- In office 1945–

Personal details
- Born: 14 February 1907; Mokren, Bulgaria
- Died: 1986; Sofia, Bulgaria

Ekaterina Stefanova Avramova (14 February 1907 – 1986) was a Bulgarian politician. She was one of the first group of women elected to the National Assembly in 1945.

== Biography ==
Avramova was born in 1907 in the village of Mokren. She joined the Bulgarian Communist Party (BCP) in 1931 and became a member of the central committee of the Workers Youth League two years later. She attended Sofia University, majoring in German philology, but was expelled in 1934 and sent back to Mokren. She became an instructor in the central committee of the BCP in 1936. In 1941 she was arrested and sent to the women's section of the Gonda Voda camp. She escaped in 1943 and began working for the BCP the following year, becoming an employee of the Ministry of the Interior.

A member of the BCP central committee from 1945 to 1966, she was a candidate in the 1945 parliamentary elections, the first in which women could stand, and was elected to the National Assembly, becoming one of the first group of women in parliament. She was re-elected in 1946. In 1949 she became head of the central committee's external department, a role she held until 1952. Re-elected again in 1949 and 1953, she headed the central committee's Agitation and Propaganda department from 1955 to 1957 and then became chair of the Committee for Friendship and Cultural Relations with Foreign Countries in 1957, remaining in post until 1966. She was re-elected to the National Assembly in 1957, 1962 and 1966, after which she served as deputy chair of the National Assembly until 1971. Following the adoption of the 1971 constitution, she was appointed Secretary of the Council for the Protection and Reproduction of the Natural Environment.

She died in Sofia in 1986.
