= First Dimitrov Government =

Government of Bulgaria (1946–1947)

- 65th Cabinet of Bulgaria
- 1946–1947
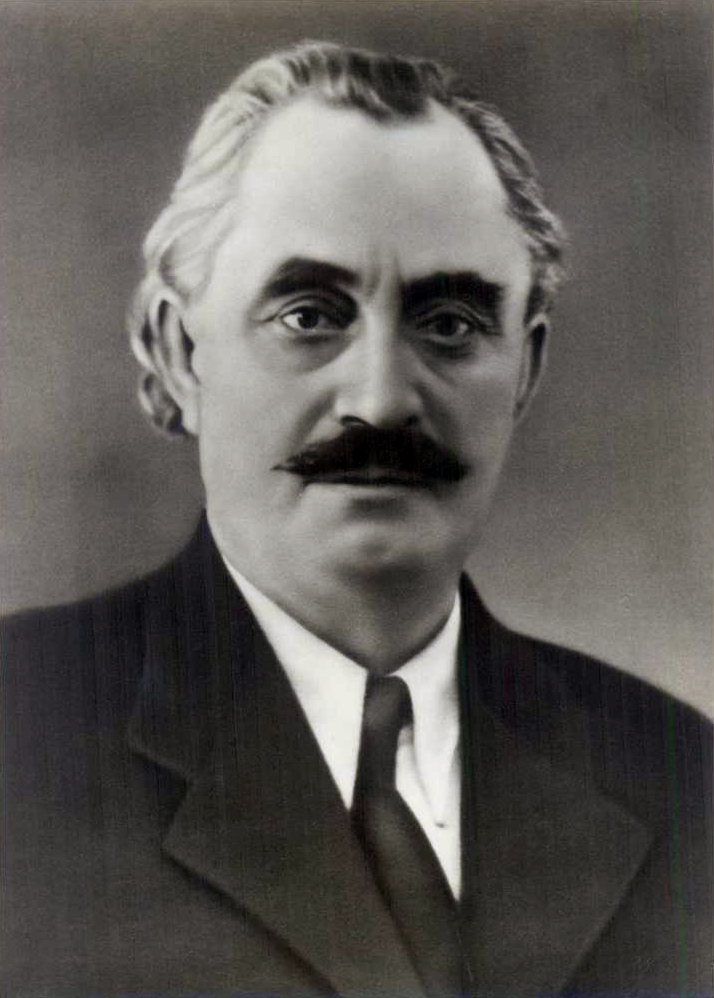
- Date formed: 23 November 1946
- Date dissolved: 11 December 1947

People and organisations
- Chairman of the CM: Georgi Dimitrov
- No. of ministers: 19
- Member parties: OF (BKP & BZNS)

History
- Election: 27 October 1946
- Outgoing election: 18 December 1949
- Predecessor: Georgiev III
- Successor: Dimitrov II

The First Dimitrov Government was the sixty-fifth government of Bulgaria (first of the People's Republic of Bulgaria), elected by the 6th Great National Assembly of November 23, 1946. The government lasted until December 11, 1947, after which the second government of Georgi Dimitrov was elected. The cabinet, headed by Georgi Dimitrov, was composed of political figures of the Fatherland Front (Bulgaria), namely those from Political Circle "Zveno", Bulgarian Communist Party, BRSDP, Bulgarian Agrarian National Union and non-partisans.

== Government Policies ==
=== Foreign Policy ===
The government lead Bulgaria out of international isolation by concluding a peace treaty with the Allies of World War II and further engagement with the USSR and the countries with pro-communist governments. Opened on July 29, 1946, the Paris Conference ended on February 10, 1947 with the signing by the belligerents of the 1947 Paris Peace Treaty. Bulgaria was represented by Kimon Georgiev, Alexander Obbov and Traicho Kostov, who signed the peace treaty on behalf of Bulgaria, which came into force on September 15 of the same year. Bulgaria retained its territory from January 1, 1944 and obligated to pay reparations of $45 million in goods to Greece for a period of eight years. The strength of the Bulgarian army was reduced to 65,000 people. During implementation of the treaty, Yugoslavia waived reparations from Bulgaria. The Fatherland Front (Bulgaria) government accepted the idea of the Comintern for the existence of a Macedonian nation and began preparations for handing over Pirin to Yugoslavia.

=== Internal Policy ===
A two-year national economic plan (1947–1948) was adopted, a youth brigadier movement was organized, and measures were taken to strengthen labor cooperative farms. On August 26, 1947, the 6th Great National Assembly voted "Law on the dissolution of the Bulgarian Agrarian National Union and all its sections". Also during this government ministry, there were initiatives for the nationalization of enterprises, mines and banks and ongoing land cooperativization. On December 6, 1947, the new constitution of the People's Republic of Bulgaria came into force, which provided the legal basis for the government.

== Important Events ==
- July 29, 1946 - The Paris Peace Conference was opened, which concluded on February 10, 1947 with the signing of peace agreements between the warring parties.
- August 26, 1947 - The Great National Assembly passed the "Law on the dissolution of the Bulgarian Agrarian National Union and all its sections".
- December 6, 1947 – The Constitution of the People's Republic of Bulgaria (1947) of the People's Republic of Bulgaria came into force.

== Cabinet ==
Portfolio	Minister	Took office	Left office	Party
Chairman of the Council of Ministers	Georgi Dimitrov	November 23, 1946	December 11, 1947	Bulgarian Communist Party
Deputy Chairman of the Council of Ministers	Kimon Georgiev	November 23, 1946	December 11, 1947	Zveno
Deputy Chairman of the Council of Ministers	Alexander Obbov	November 23, 1946	December 11, 1947	Bulgarian Agrarian National Union
Deputy Chairman of the Council of Ministers	Georgi Popov (politician)	November 23, 1946	December 11, 1947	Bulgarian Workers' Social Democratic Party
Deputy Chairman of the Council of Ministers	Traicho Kostov	November 23, 1946	December 11, 1947	Bulgarian Workers' Social Democratic Party
Minister of Agriculture and State Property	Georgi Traikov	November 23, 1946	December 11, 1947	Bulgarian Agrarian National Union
Minister of Culture	Dimo Kazasov	November 23, 1946	December 11, 1947	non-partisan
Minister of Electrification, Water and Natural Resources	Manol Sakelarov	November 23, 1946	December 11, 1947	Bulgarian Communist Party
Minister of Finance	Ivan Stefanov (economist)	November 23, 1946	December 11, 1947	Bulgarian Communist Party
Minister of Foreign Affairs	Kimon Georgiev	November 23, 1946	December 11, 1947	Zveno
Minister of Industry and Crafts	Hristo Lilkov	November 23, 1946	December 11, 1947	Bulgarian Communist Party
Minister of Internal Affairs	Anton Yugov	November 23, 1946	December 11, 1947	Bulgarian Communist Party
Minister of Justice	Radi Naydenov (politician)	November 23, 1946	December 11, 1947	Bulgarian Agrarian National Union
Minister of Public Buildings, Roads and Public Works	Georgi Dragnev	November 23, 1946	December 11, 1947	Bulgarian Agrarian National Union
Ministry of Popular Enlightenment	Mincho Neychev	November 23, 1946	December 11, 1947	Bulgarian Communist Party
Minister of Public Health	Racho Angelov	November 23, 1946	December 11, 1947	Bulgarian Agrarian National Union
Minister of Railways, Post and Telegraphs	Stefan Tonchev	November 23, 1946	December 11, 1947	Bulgarian Agrarian National Union
Minister of Social Policy	Zdravko Mitovski	November 23, 1946	December 11, 1947	Bulgarian Workers' Social Democratic Party
Minister of Trade and Food	Yordan Bozhilov	November 23, 1946	December 11, 1947	Bulgarian Communist Party
Minister of War	Georgi Damyanov	November 23, 1946	December 11, 1947	Bulgarian Communist Party
Chairman of the Supreme Economic Council	Dobri Terpeshev	November 23, 1946	December 11, 1947	Bulgarian Communist Party
Minister without portfolio	Alexander Obbov	November 23, 1946	December 11, 1947	Bulgarian Agrarian National Union
Minister without portfolio	Georgi Popov (politician)	November 23, 1946	December 11, 1947	Bulgarian Workers' Social Democratic Party
Minister without portfolio	Traicho Kostov	November 23, 1946	December 11, 1947	Bulgarian Workers' Social Democratic Party

== Bibliography ==
- Nedev, Nedyo (2007). Three coup d'états or Kimon Georgiev and his time (in Bulgarian). Sofia: Siela. ISBN 978-954-28-0163-4.

Government offices
Preceded by Georgiev III	Governments of Bulgaria	Succeeded by Dimitrov II
