= Ivan Abadzhiev (politician) =

Bulgarian politician and diplomat

- Иван Абаджиев

First Secretary of the Dimitrov Young Communist League
- In office November 1958 – April 1965

Deputy of the National Assembly of Bulgaria
- In office February 1962 – May 1976

Member of the Central Committee of the Bulgarian Communist Party
- In office November 1962 – January 1976

Candidate Member of the Politburo of the Bulgarian Communist Party
- In office November 1966 – July 1974

Central Committee Secretary of the Bulgarian Communist Party
- In office April 1971 – July 1974

Ambassador of the People's Republic of Bulgaria to Romania
- In office August 1974 – July 1976

Ambassador of the People's Republic of Bulgaria to Tunisia
- In office September 1976 – September 1983

Personal details
- Born: 8 January 1930 Ovoshtnik, Stara Zagora District
- Died: 2006 (aged 75–76)

Ivan Stefanov Abadzhiev (Bulgarian: Иван Стефанов Абаджиев; 1930–2006) was a Bulgarian politician and diplomat. He headed the Dimitrov Young Communist League for six years, and went on to be a district-level party organizer. He was a member of parliament for 14 years. As a younger member of the Politburo in the 1970s, he became seen as a potential "heir apparent" to lead the country, but his political career abruptly ended in July 1974. He later served as the ambassador of Bulgaria to Romania and Tunisia.

== Youth ==
He was born on 8 January 1930, in Ovoshtnik in Stara Zagora District, growing up in a peasant family. His parents were active in the communist resistance movement. Abadzhiev joined the Workers Youth League in 1944. In 1950 he became a member of the Bulgarian Communist Party. Abadzhiev graduated from the Faculty of Law at Sofia University.

After graduation, he moved to Kazanlak and became the First Secretary of the local municipal committee of the Dimitrov Popular Youth League (later renamed as the Dimitrov Young Communist League). In 1954 he was inducted into the Central Committee of the Dimitrov Popular Youth League. In May 1958 he was named First Secretary of the Stara Zagora District Committee of the Dimitrov Young Communist League. At the Ninth Congress of the Dimitrov Young Communist League, held in November 1958 he was elected First Secretary of the organization at the national level.

In February 1962 he was elected to the National Assembly, and at the Eight Party Congress in November the same year he was elected to the Central Committee of the Bulgarian Communist Party. He was reelected as First Secretary of the Dimitrov Young Communist League at the Tenth Congress of the organization in April 1963. In 1963 he was elected to the National Council of the Fatherland Front and inducted into its Executive Committee. As the leader of the Dimitrov Young Communist League, he visited the Soviet Union, Czechoslovakia, Guinea and Cuba.

== Party organizer in Sliven and Vratsa ==
In April 1965 he was relieved of his responsibilities in the youth organization and on 15 April 1965, he was appointed as the First Secretary of the Sliven District Committee of the Communist Party, a role he would hold until 19 October 1967. As the new Party District Committee head, Abadzhiev criticized local party officials for complacency with corrupt practices under the now deposed Sliven District People's Council chairman Dragiya Kurtev.

Abadzhiev was a candidate member of Politburo of the Bulgarian Communist Party between November 1966 and July 1974, having been elected to the post after the Ninth Party Congress. He was the young candidate member of the Politburo at the time. Between September 1967 and 1971 he served as the First Secretary of the Vratsa District Organization of the Communist Party. Abadzhiev was being sent to Vratsa District to lead a purge of the party organization there, which had been a stronghold of the elements behind the April 1965 plot. In April 1968, in the presence of Todor Zhivkov, Abadzhiev delivered a report to the Vratsa District Party Plenum wherein he outlined that the April 1965 plotters had been strong in the party district organization and that traces of this tendency had still not been eliminated. Abadzhiev's report was reprinted in full in the local party organ Otechestven Zov, but passages relating to the April 1965 plot were censored in the national press organs.

== Rise in the party hierarchy ==
Following his intervention in the Vratsa District, Abadzhiev quickly rose in the national party hierarchy. Between April 1971 and July 1974 Abadzhiev was one of the Secretaries of the Central Committee of the Communist Party. He chaired the International Relations Commission of the Central Committee between October 1971 and July 1972, and then chaired the Ideological Committee of the Central Committee between July 1972 and July 1974. Abadzhiev was removed from the Politburo and his post as Central Committee Secretary at the Central Committee plenum on 3 July 1974. According to Richard Felix Staar (1975) it was "difficult to interpret the foregoing changes in the top BCP leadership. [...] Abadzhiev's removal that remains most intriguing. He had been responsible for science and higher education. Considered a likely successor to the Party leader, Abadzhiev may have been removed as a prophylactic measure by Todor Zhivkov". James F. Brown (1988) also argued that Abadzhiev had been seen as Zhivkov's "heir apparent" before his ousting in July 1974. Subsequently, Abadzhiev was named ambassador to Romania in August 1974.

== Diplomat ==
Abadzhiev was removed from the Central Committee of the Communist Party on 27 January 1976. He was not re-elected to the National Assembly in the May 1976 election. He was removed from the post of ambassador to Romania in July 1976. In September 1976 he was named Bulgarian ambassador to Tunisia. He remained in his role as ambassador in Tunis until September 1983.

Ivan Abadzhiev died in 2006.
