= Bulgarian Workers' Party =

Ruling party of Bulgaria from 1946 to 1948

Bulgarian Workers' Party Българска работническа партия
- Abbreviation: BRP/БРП
- General Secretary: Georgi Dimitrov
- Founded: 1938
- Dissolved: 1948; 78 years ago
- Preceded by: Bulgarian Communist Party
- Succeeded by: Bulgarian Communist Party
- Newspaper: Rabotnichesko Delo
- Ideology: Communism; Marxism–Leninism
- Political position: Far-left
- National affiliation: Fatherland Front (1942–1948)
- International affiliation: Cominform (1947–1948)
- Colors: Red, Yellow, White
- Anthem: The Internationale

Party flag

The Bulgarian Workers' Party (Bulgarian: Българска работническа партия (БРП), Romanised: Bŭlgarska rabotnitscheska partiya; BRP) was a name adopted by the BKP after its merger with the Workers' Party in the late 1930s. The BRP declared against Bulgaria's accession to the Tripartite Pact, and after the start of the war against the USSR, it proceeded, under instructions from Moscow, to organize an armed resistance movement. A little later, in 1942, again on the initiative of Moscow, the BRP proposed the creation of the Fatherland Front to a number of other opposition formations, which would be politically and organizationally liquidated after only a few years. From 1948, the BRP was renamed again to the BKP.

== History ==
In 1938, by decision of the Central Committee, the illegal Bulgarian Communist Party and the legal Workers' Party merged their activities into a new party under the name Bulgarian Workers' Party.

In 1936–1940, the party organized numerous strikes of varying scale. In 1940, it led the Sobolev's Action in an attempt to gain acceptance of the Soviet Union's proposal to Bulgaria for a treaty of friendship and mutual assistance. The pro-German government of Bogdan Filov, however, was oriented towards an alliance with Nazi Germany and rejected the proposal. According to Daniela Gorcheva, the Bulgarian communists were the only ones who in November 1940 wanted Bulgaria to enter the Tripartite Pact. On June 22, 1941, immediately after the attack of Nazi Germany on the USSR, the BRP called on the people not to cooperate with the government and the German troops. On June 24, the party declared a course of armed struggle. The BRP headed the activities of the terrorist battle groups and the partisan movement in Bulgaria, published illegal newspapers and pamphlets. It participated in the organization of the Fatherland Front and as part of it declared Bulgaria's withdrawal from the Tripartite Pact and joining the anti-Hitler coalition. On August 26, 1944, encouraged by the successful advance of the Red Army into the Balkans, the leadership of the BRP issued District No. 4, in which it called on all its activists to prepare an armed uprising with the aim of "overthrowing the monarcho-fascist dictatorship". After the USSR declared war on Bulgaria on September 5, on September 6, the capture of populated areas in the country by partisan formations and combat groups began. On September 7, the prisons in Pleven and Varna were broken up and the political prisoners were released. Early in the morning of September 9, 1944, military units that had gone over to the OF side, assisted by partisan detachments and combat groups, seized key points in Sofia and overthrew the government of Konstantin Muraviev. A government was formed, headed by Kimon Georgiev, in which the BRP (presenting itself under that name for the first time), the BZNS Pladne and the PK "Zveno" participated with an equal number of ministers. Local power in the country was taken over by committees of the OF, dominated by communists and left-wing farmers. On October 6, 1944, the government approved the Regulation-law on the trial by people's court of those responsible for Bulgaria's involvement in the war. On December 20, 1944, the Regulation-law on the labor and educational dormitories for politically dangerous persons was adopted. BRP activists, mostly former partisans, were widely appointed to the influential post of assistant commander during Bulgaria's participation in World War II against Nazi Germany. After the conclusion of the People's Court trials in April 1945, numerous forced labor camps were established throughout the country and a large number of political opponents were killed. In 1945, the government organized parliamentary elections. In the opinion of the opposition and the Western Allies, they were heavily manipulated and they boycotted them. Under pressure from the United States and Great Britain through their representatives in the Allied Control Commission, the OF agreed to include opposition leaders in the government, but negotiations with them failed. In March 1946, a new OF government was formed, headed by Kimon Georgiev. During this election campaign, women and military personnel received voting rights for the first time. 14 women were elected to parliament for the first time. In 1945, an expanded plenum of the Bulgarian Communist Party was held, where the party seniority and social status of 94 out of a total of 120 members of the Bulgarian Communist Party's Regional Committees were established. By social status, 38 of the members are workers (including industrial and artisan workers), 50 are intelligentsia (50 are students, etc., 13 are teachers, 2 are engineers, 3 are accountants, 3 are lawyers, 1 doctor and 1 technician), 3 are small owners (farmers), 3 are artisans. By party seniority, people with 11 to 15 years predominate – 38 people, followed by those with 6 to 10 years – 21 people and 21 – 25 years – 16 people. 6 people have 16 to 20 years of experience, 10 people have 1 to 5 years of experience and 3 people have the most party experience of 26 to 30 years. In 1946, the BRP, together with the other parties of the OF, initiated and held a referendum on the state structure of Bulgaria – whether it should be a republic or a monarchy. All parties in the country supported the republican structure and the results of the referendum were 92.7% in favor of the republic. The illegal organizations IMRO, “Tsar Krum”, “Khan Kubrat”, Union of the Bulgarian National Legions and others were persecuted and gradually defeated. Soon after, elections for a Grand National Assembly were held, won by a large majority by the OF. A government dominated by the BRP was formed with Prime Minister Georgi Dimitrov. The GNA repealed the Tarnovo Constitution and adopted a new, republican constitution, which became known as the Dimitrov Constitution. In 1947, with the help of the Soviet government, the BRP moved to establish totalitarian control over state power (full political control, political dictatorship): on the basis of the "Regulation-Law for the Protection of People's Power", the persecution of the political opposition began. Its leaders were thrown into prisons and camps, and the parties themselves were closed. Prominent opposition politicians Nikola Petkov, Tsveti Ivanov, Krastyo Pastuhov, Trifon Kunev were repressed in various ways. The Fatherland Front parties BRSDP (sh.s.) and NS "Zveno" merge into the Communist Party or Fatherland Front and recognize its program. The only legal parties in the country remain the BRP and its coalition partner BZNS. The farmers, under the leadership of Georgi Traykov, abandon the class theory of Alexander Stamboliyski, accept the program of the BRP and recognize its leading role.

By the time of the 5th Congress of the Bulgarian Communist Party at the end of 1948, the party had become the permanent ruling party in the country. At this congress it adopted the name Bulgarian Communist Party.

== Leaders ==
=== Chairman of the Workers' Party of Bulgaria ===
Chairman			Term of office			Notes
Nº	Portrait	Name (Born–Died)	Took office	Left office	Duration	Notes
1		Georgi Dimitrov; Георги Димитров (1882–1949)	1933	27 December 1948		

== Organizational structure ==
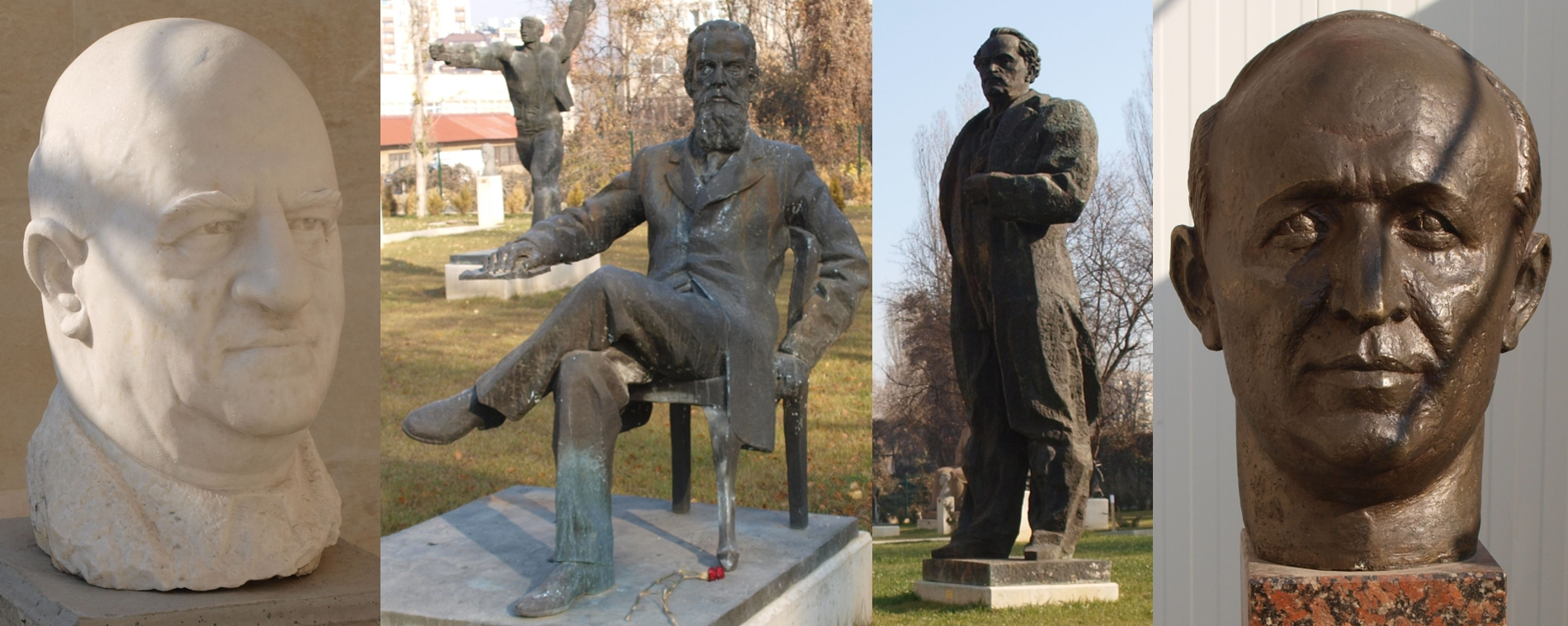
Sculptures of the communist Bulgarian leaders in the Museum of Socialist Art in Sofia: Vasil Kolarov, Dimitar Blagoev, Georgi Dimitrov and Todor Zhivkov.

=== Party congresses ===
Congresses and national conferences adopt the program and statutes of the party, approve the accounts of the past periods, develop directives and decisions for further activity. They elect the central governing bodies of the party.

=== Central Committee ===
The Central Committee of the BRP is the highest governing body that operates between congresses.

== Electoral history ==
Election	Party leader	Votes		Seats		Position
Election	Party leader	#	%	#	±	Position
Georgi Dimitrov	Banned				Opposition	
Georgi Dimitrov	Banned				1939	Opposition
Georgi Dimitrov	1945	as part of the Fatherland Front		94 / 276	▲94	Coalition
Georgi Dimitrov	1946	2,264,852	53.88	278 / 465	▲184	Majority

== See also ==
- Buzludzha
- Eastern Bloc politics
- History of Bulgaria
