= Goryani =

Bulgarian guerrilla movement

Goryani movement
- Part of anti-communist insurgencies in Central and Eastern Europe
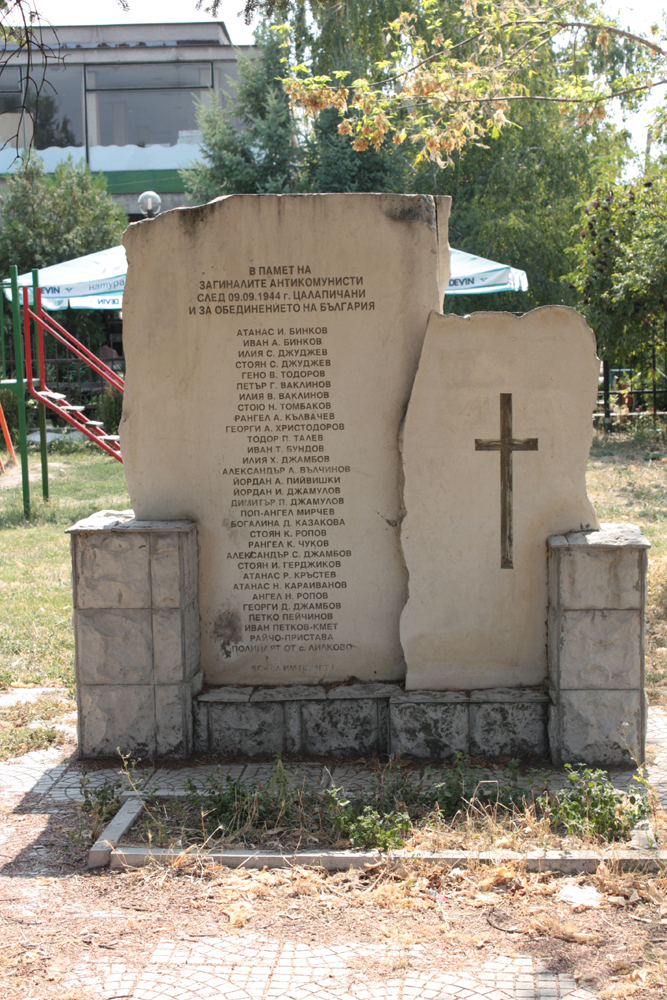
- Monument of the perished anticommunists in Tsalapitsa
Date	1944 – 1956
Location	People's Republic of Bulgaria
Result	Goryani defeated by 1956

Belligerents
Bulgaria	Goryani rebels

Commanders and leaders
Kimon Georgiev; Georgi Dimitrov; Vasil Kolarov; Valko Chervenkov; Anton Yugov; Todor Zhivkov	No centralized leadership

The Goryani movement (Bulgarian: Горянско движение) or Goryanstvo (Bulgarian: горянство: Goryanism) was an active guerrilla resistance against the Soviet-aligned People's Republic of Bulgaria. It began immediately after the Ninth of September coup d'état in 1944 which opened the way to communist rule in Bulgaria, and ended in 1956. The movement covered the entire country, including urban areas and is known to have been the first organised anti-Soviet armed resistance in eastern Europe as well as the longest lasting.

The members of the movement were dubbed Goryani (Bulgarian: Горяни: those in the forest), most likely not by themselves but pejoratively by the authorities or by street wits. Extremely scant official acknowledgements of the movement termed its members diversanti (Bulgarian: диверсанти: subversives, saboteurs and invariably stressed that they had been sent across the border by "imperialist centres".) Though helped to a significant extent by emigre Bulgarians and by foreign powers, the Goryani movement was mostly indigenous and spontaneous.

Its mode of action was traditionally Bulgarian, as practiced by the anti-Ottoman hayduti [Bulgarian хайдути: outlaws] and the anti-Nazi Partisans (pejoratively called Shumkari; Bulgarian: Шумкари, those of the bushes): the Goryani hid in remote mountains, highlands and forests, relying on a large network of yatatsi (Bulgarian: ятаци; illicit helpers) in settled communities, conducted sudden armed raids to disturb official business and withdrew before capture. Largely composed of country folk who defended their land and property from the communists, the Goryani had no discernible ideology or platform and were united by their dislike of the communist authorities.

Very little information has survived on the Goryani, whose existence was steadfastly concealed and denied by the Bulgarian communist authorities, with historical data on them carefully classified and removed and witnesses or participants intimidated into silence or eliminated. Since the movement was practically devoid of any international dimension, its history has remained remote from the mainstream of world anti-communist resistance.

== Origins ==
The new communist government, aided by the Red Army, imposed a policy of class war through several waves of terror: extrajudicial intimidation immediately after the 9 September 1944 coup, People's Court tribunals in the mid-1940s, the elimination of opposition to the Bulgarian Communist Party in the late 1940s and the hunt for "Enemies with a Party Ticket" at the close of the 1940s and into the 1950s.

Armed resistance to the communists began in the immediate aftermath of the coup and reached sustainable proportions in the countryside after the execution of Bulgarian Agrarian National Union leader Nikola Petkov in 1947 and the banning of the Bulgarian Social Democratic Workers' Party in 1948. By the late 1940s, the Goryani comprised mostly country folk, members of the disbanded opposition hiding from the authorities, former soldiers and officers, former Internal Macedonian Revolutionary Organization (IMRO) activists, a handful of former pro-communist partisans, and communists who had been associated with executed "Enemy with a Party Ticket" Traycho Kostov.

Large-scale forced land collectivisation campaigns began in the 1950s. They involved mass intimidation of the peasantry, including threats, extrajudicial imprisonment and torture, and murder. This brought a new upsurge of support for the Goryani movement.

== Numbers and scope ==
At first, the Goryani were poorly armed and merely hid from the authorities or agitated against them in fear of arrest. By 1947, they had banded into armed Chetas [Bulgarian, чети: bands] in highland and mountain areas.

At that time, the overall number of armed Goryani was estimated at 2,000 in 28 Chetas, with another 8,000 illicit helpers supplying them with food, shelter, arms and intelligence. By the early 1950s, the DS secret police had identified some 160 Chetas, of which 52 were supplied from abroad or comprised hostile emigres who had infiltrated across borders. The movement was strongest in Southern Bulgaria, particularly in the localities of Sliven, Stara Zagora, Velingrad, and the Pirin Kray (area).

The movement was strongest in the Pirin area in 1947 and 1948. The main Cheta led by Gerasim Todorov controlled the larger part of the Sveti Vrach (today Sandanski) county in the southwest of the area, traversing as far as the Mesta valley and Razlog to the northeast, Nevrokop (today Gotse Delchev) in the south and Dzhumaya (Gorna Dzhumaya, today Blagoevgrad) in the north. In the spring of 1948, thousands of narodna militsia police and troops invaded the northern Pirin, imposing a two-week emergency in the area. Gerasim Todorov and his men were encircled and he killed himself on 31 March. This cleared the area of Goryani for a period. In late 1948 Borislav Atanasov and other former IMRO fighters crossed the Greek border and renewed resistance.

One of the very few officially acknowledged incidents involving anti-communist resistance involved the death in an armed skirmish of border guard Vergil Vaklinov on 2 July 1953. Vaklinov had ambushed diversanti who were claimed to have "fulfilled a task" in the Bulgarian interior and were about to cross the Greek border illicitly. The authorities elevated Vaklinov into a short-lived cult figure.

By the early 1950s, the Goryani had a propaganda radio station, Radio Goryanin, which broadcast into Bulgaria from Greece. In mid-1951 the radio broadcast an appeal for an insurgent army to form in the centrally located Sliven area, where the movement was at its strongest. Some 13,000 police and troops invaded the Balkan mountains near Sliven. Bulgarian leader Valko Chervenkov monitored events from an armoured personnel carrier in the mountain. The largest Cheta, led by Georgi Stoyanov-Tarpana, also known as Benkovski after a 19th-century Bulgarian popular hero, was encircled by 6,000 troops. It fought them on 1 and 2 June, managing to break the encirclement and rescue their wounded.

Few fell prisoner to the authorities. Some 40 Goryani were killed, but the Cheta commander fled along with his men. Stoyanov was captured by the DS secret police in late 1951 and was later tried and executed. The following year, his Cheta continued resisting the authorities and capturing villages. Thus, it captured and held the village of Rakovo near Sliven for three days in 1952.

During the same period, some 15 Goryani parachuted into the Kazanlak and Ihtiman areas from training camps in Yugoslavia and France.

In addition to highland, mountain and woodland-based resistance, the movement was active in lowland and farming areas. The Dobrudzha area in the northeast of Bulgaria saw strong resistance activity, many villages being captured for short periods. The lowland Ruse area also saw Goryani activity led by Tsanko Ivanov Tsankov-Mecheto and Tsvetana Popkoeva-Tsena. The Ruse Goryani took an oath formulated by Todor Tsanev. Their commander Tsankov was shot dead in combat, while Popkoeva was tried in absentia, to be captured and killed without trial in time to celebrate May Day 1952. Todor Tsanev was captured, imprisoned and sent to punishment camps for 11 years, to die peacefully in 1989.

== The end of resistance ==
Though the Bulgarian authorities brought the Goryani movement under control by the mid-1950s, there were isolated incidents of violence into the late 1950s and early 1960s. Goryani were last encountered in the Sofia sewerage system in the early/mid-1960s.

== Sources ==
- Горяни
- Габриела Цанева, “Миналото в мен”-повест, В. Търново, 1994, изд.”Сеяч” към Словото - Българската виртуална библиотека (повестта я има и в библиотеките)
- Николай Илиев, “Въоръжената антикомунистическа съпротива”, в.”Про&Анти”, 2007г. броеве 39-45
- В. ”Трета възраст”, 2008г.,бр.39
- Border: A Journey to the Edge of Europe. By Kapka Kassabova. Granta; 379 pages; £14.99. To be published in America by Graywolf in September 2017; $16.
