= Rada Todorova =

Bulgarian sociologist, writer and politician

Deputy Minister of Labour and Social Welfare
- In office 1947–1950

Member of the National Assembly
- In office 1945–

Personal details
- Born: 22 August 1902; Karavelovo, Bulgaria
- Died: 1987

Rada Noeva Todorova (22 August 1902 – 1987) was a Bulgarian politician. She was one of the first group of women elected to the National Assembly in 1945.

== Biography ==
Todorova was born in 1902 in the village of Karavelovo. In 1920 she joined Komsomol, and in 1922 became a member of the Bulgarian Communist Party (BCP). After completing high school in Karlovo, she became a teacher in Karavelovo. Having collaborated with the BCP's military organisation, she was arrested in 1925 and sentenced to twelve years in prison. She was released in 1932, and became a member of the Plovdiv district committee of the BCP. She served on the party's central committee from 1936 to 1937. In 1941 she was interred in the St Nichola labour camp, but escaped and became organisational secretary of the Plovdiv branch of the BCP. The organisation was uncovered in 1942 and she was arrested and sentenced to life in prison.

Between 1944 and 1945 Todorova was a member of the first chamber of the People's Court, which tried royal officials and government ministers. She became a member of the national assembly of the Fatherland Front in 1944. She also served as chair of the Committee of Bulgarian Women, and was a member of the Women's International Democratic Federation from 1947 to 1987. She was a candidate in the 1945 parliamentary elections, the first in which women could stand, and was elected to the National Assembly, becoming one of the first group of women in parliament. Between 1947 and 1950 she served as Deputy Minister of Labour and Social Welfare. From 1954 to 1990 she was a member of the BCP central committee, and from 1958 to 1971 she was a member of the Presidium of the National Assembly.

A member of the National Committee for the Defence of Peace, Todorova also edited the Woman Today magazine. In 1964 she was awarded the Hero of Socialist Labour and in 1982 was made a Hero of the People's Republic of Bulgaria in 1982. She was also awarded the Order of Georgi Dimitrov four times. She died in 1987.
