= Kosta Keremedchiev =

Bulgarian politician

Kosta Petrov Keremedchiev was a Bulgarian politician. He was born on August 16, 1922 in Petrich. He joined the Workers Youth League in 1937. In 1941 he was expelled from secondary school in Petrich. He joined the Bulgarian Communist Party in 1943. The same year he was interned in detention camp. In 1944 he joined the partisan resistance movement. After 1944 he became the Communist Party Petrich County Committee secretary. He was the Secretary of the Blagoevgrad District Committee of the Communist Party from 1953 to 1959.

Keremedchiev studied at the High Party School in Moscow from 1955 to 1958. Returning to Bulgaria, he became the Deputy Chairman of the Blagoevgrad District People's Council in 1959, and then served as its Chairman from 1962 to 1970. In 1962 he became a candidate member of the Central Committee of the Bulgarian Communist Party. Between 1966 and 1976 he was a member of the Central Committee. He was elected to the National Assembly in 1966. In 1971 he was appointed Deputy Minister of Supply and State Reserves. In 1972 he was awarded the Order of People's Republic of Bulgaria, 1st Class.
