= Epoha =

Bulgarian newspaper published daily between 1922 and 1925

Epoha (Bulgarian: Епоха, 'Epoch') was a Bulgarian daily newspaper, published from Sofia between June 25, 1922 and December 29, 1925. Epoha functioned as a mouthpiece of the rightist tendency within the Bulgarian Social Democratic Workers Party.

Grigor Cheshmedzhiev served as the editor of Epoha. He edited the newspaper along with Krastyo Pastuhov. The newspaper was owned by Nikolai Donchev, a Bulgarian translator, literary critic and scholar.

Epoha ran a defamatory campaign against the Bulgarian Communist Party and the Bulgarian Agrarian National Union. The Agrarian National Union government banned the newspaper on May 8, 1923. Epoha resumed publication after the June 9, 1923 coup d'etat (which Cheshmedzhiev and Pashutov celebrated), which issues coming out after June 11, 1923. The front page of the June 11, 1923 carried the message 'Christ has resurrected!" (in reference to the June 9 coup d'etat). After the coup Epoha stepped up its attacks on the Communist Party and the Agrarian National Union.

Epoha was closed down in December 1925, following a decision of the Central Committee of the Bulgarian Social Democratic Workers Party.
