= Narod =

Narod (Russian: народ), a Slavic word meaning "nation" or "people", can refer to:

- Narod, California
- Narod (Bulgarian newspaper)
- National Russian Liberation Movement, abbreviated NAROD

== See also ==
- Narodniks
