= Monument to Stamen Panchev, Botevgrad =

Coordinates: 42°54′27″N 23°47′36″E

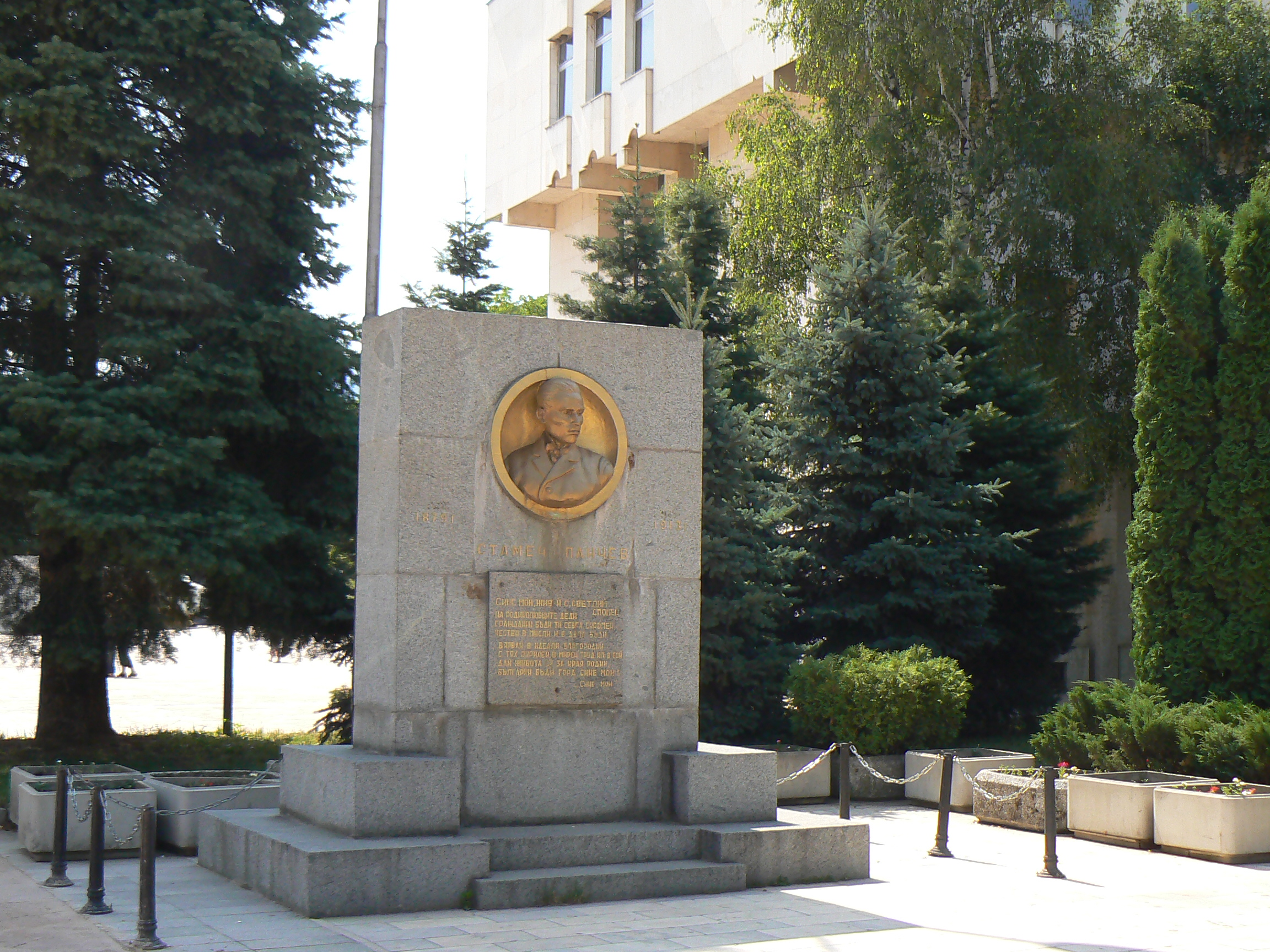
Monument to Stamen Panchev in its current form and location

Monument to Stamen Panchev is one of the landmarks of Botevgrad, Bulgaria. It is located in the "Liberation" („Освобождение“) square downtown, and was erected in honor of the Bulgarian poet and officer Stamen Panchev.

== Installation ==
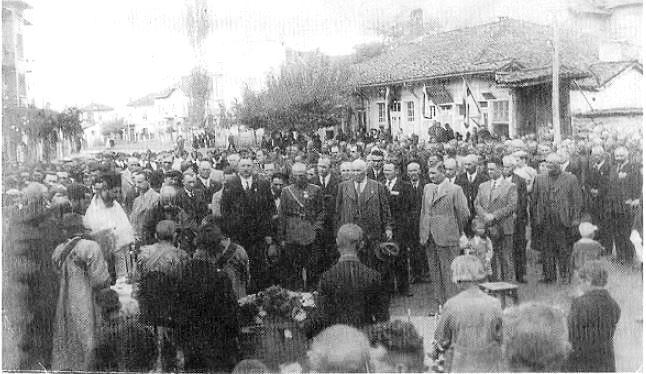
Ceremony of setting the first stone of the monument, May 24, 1938

The initiative to erect the monument came from the "Sursuvul" society of officers in reserve. Stamen Panchev was an officer himself, who died in the First Balkan War. He had been injured, and returned to the battle when he found out about the fall of Edirne fortress. After his death, he was promoted to lieutenant, and the people of Botevgrad started uncovering his poetic talent. In 1938, 25 years after his death, a fund was created in order to gather money for the monument. First stone was set on May 24 the same year; the ceremony was assisted by people of the city and conducted by Panchev's friend, captain Krastev. Monument was officially inaugurated on October 22, 1939, in presence of Panchev's wife, Rayna, and their son, Pavel, to whom Stamen had dedicated a poem, "My son" („Сине мой“).

The monument was built of granite blocks. The bas-relief representing Panchev's bust is made of bronze by sculptor Yanko Pavlov. On the back side of the monument, verses from Stamen's poems are carved. Around the monument, a small garden was planted, surrounded by a metal fence. Later, a fountain was installed. The monument was located in the "Liberation" („Освобождение“) square, where festivities take place regularly.

== Removal ==
In the 1950s, the city's bus station, operating routes to major Bulgarian cities, was built in the square, which led to dismantling the monument. The following few years, the bronze bas-relief was kept in a school nearby, forgotten. Relatives of Stamen Panchev wrote to the Ministry of Culture asking for the monument to be re-erected. In response, in January 1954, a telegram signed by Prime Minister Valko Chervenkov was sent to the city council, and personally to the head of the council Savo Donchev, instructing to rebuild the monument as soon as possible. Thus, during very cold winter days, the granite wall was rebuilt in the court of the school that was hosting the bas-relief. The monument stayed here for 43 years.

== Restoration ==
In 1996, the "Orkhaniets" („Орханиец“ – "People of Botevgrad") society sent a letter to Mayor Georgi Peyev and the city council, requesting the monument to be reinstalled on its original location, in the "Liberation" square. The Ministry of Culture approved the request, so on May 31 a second inauguration of the monument was held. Grandchildren and great-grandchildren of Stamen Panchev attended the event, as well as people of the city.
