= Dimitrov Communist Youth Union =

Dimitrov Communist Youth Union Димитровски комунистически младежки съюз
- Founded: September 1944
- Dissolved: February 1990
- Headquarters: Sofia, People's Republic of Bulgaria
- Ideology: Communism; Marxism–Leninism; Stalinism (until 1956)
- Mother party: Bulgarian Communist Party
- National affiliation: Fatherland Front
- International affiliation: WFDY

The Dimitrov Communist Youth Union (Bulgarian: Димитровски комунистически младежки съюз, DKMS) was the state-sanctioned youth movement in the People's Republic of Bulgaria and an important organ of the Bulgarian Communist Party, which utilized the organization to educate the Bulgarian youth in Marxist-Leninist philosophy and prepare the younger generations for future party membership. It was the parent organization of the Dimitrovist Pioneer Organization "Septemberists", the membership of which was for children between 9 and 14 years of age.

The official march of the DKMS was "Комсомол, Комсомол, ти летиш като сокол!" ('Komsomol, Komsomol, you fly like a falcon!').

It dissolved itself at an extraordinary congress in February 1990. In its place, the youth organization Bulgarian Democratic Youth (BDM, nicknamed Badema, Бадема) was established. The last First Secretary of the Central Committee of the DKMS, Rosen Karadimov, was elected head of the BDM. The BDM also controlled the vast inventory of assets (companies, buildings, recreation complexes etc.) of the former DKMS, which reportedly were mismanaged after 1990. Eventually, the BDM was gradually overtaken in influence by the youth wing of the Bulgarian Socialist Party, the Bulgarian Socialist Youth (BSM), founded in 1994, however, the BDM apparently still existed at least until 2006.

== See also ==
- Komsomol
- Workers Youth League
- Dimitrovist Pioneer Organization "Septemberists"
- Ivan Abadzhiev (born 1930)
