= 1957 Bulgarian parliamentary election =

| ← 1953 | 22 December 1957 | 1962 → |
- All 247 seats in the Grand National Assembly
- Turnout: 99.77%
| Party | Leader | Vote % | Seats | +/– |
|---|---|---|---|---|
| OF | Todor Zhivkov | 99.96 | 247 | −2 |
This lists parties that won seats. See the complete results below.
| PM before | PM after |
|---|---|
| Anton Yugov; OF | Anton Yugov; OF |

Parliamentary elections were held in Bulgaria on 22 December 1957. Voters were presented with a single list from the Fatherland Front, dominated by the Bulgarian Communist Party. As the Fatherland Front was the only organisation to contest the election and all candidate lists had to be approved by the Front, voters only had the option of voting for or against the Front list. Only 2,076 of the 5,206,103 valid votes were cast against. Voter turnout was reportedly 99.8%.

== Results ==
| Party | Votes | % | Seats | +/– |
|---|---|---|---|---|
| Fatherland Front | 5,204,027 | 99.96 | 247 | –2 |
| Against | 2,076 | 0.04 | – | – |
| Total | 5,206,103 | 100.00 | 247 | –2 |
| Valid votes | 5,206,103 | 99.99 | | |
| Invalid/blank votes | 325 | 0.01 | | |
| Total votes | 5,206,428 | 100.00 | | |
| Registered voters/turnout | 5,218,602 | 99.77 | | |
Source: Nohlen & Stöver
