= Ekaterina Avramova =

Ekarerina Avramova may refer to:

- Ekaterina Avramova (politician), Bulgarian politician who was one of the first group of women in the National Assembly
- Ekaterina Avramova (swimmer), Bulgaria-born swimmer
