= Timeline of strikes in 1953 =

Strikes in 1953

A number of labour strikes, labour disputes, and other industrial actions occurred in 1953.

== Background ==
A labour strike is a work stoppage caused by the mass refusal of employees to work. This can include wildcat strikes, which are done without union authorisation, and slowdown strikes, where workers reduce their productivity while still carrying out minimal working duties. It is usually a response to employee grievances, such as low pay or poor working conditions. Strikes can also occur to demonstrate solidarity with workers in other workplaces or pressure governments to change policies.

== Timeline ==
=== Continuing strikes from 1952 ===
- Downey's pub strike, 14-year strike by pub workers in Dún Laoghaire, Ireland, from 1939 to 1953, over the firing of a barman; one of the longest strikes in world history.
- 1952–53 Singapore Naval Base strike, 10-day strike by industrial workers at the Singapore Naval Base.

=== January ===
- 1953 Karachi student strike, in Karachi, Pakistan.

=== February ===
- 1953 Danish conscripts' strike, strikes by military conscripts in Denmark against extension of the length of conscription.

=== March ===
- 1953 Longbridge strike, 11-week strike by Austin Motor Company autoworkers at the Longbridge plant in the United Kingdom.
- 1953 Paparua Prison strike, prison strike in Aotearoa New Zealand.

=== April ===
- 1953 Bremen dock strike, 7-week strike by dockworkers in Bremen, West Germany.

=== May ===
- 1953 Milwaukee brewery strike
- Norilsk uprising, prison strike in the Soviet Union.
- Plovdiv tobacco workers' strike, in the People's Republic of Bulgaria.
- 1953 Swedish food strike, strike by food industry workers in Sweden.

=== June ===
- East German uprising of 1953

=== July ===
- Vorkuta uprising, prison strike in the Soviet Union.

=== August ===
- August 1953 French strikes, fr, mass wave of strikes in France against the government of Joseph Laniel.
- 1953 British Guiana crisis, political crisis in British Guiana beginning with the election of the left-wing People's Progressive Party and a significant strike in the sugar industry, ending with a British intervention to remove the PPP government.
- 1953 Ceylonese Hartal
- 1953 Lucknow student protests, at the University of Lucknow in India.

=== September ===
- 1953 Indonesian plantations strike

=== November ===
- 1953 Mexican film strike, 6-week strike by film composers in Mexico.
- 1953 New Jersey gas strike, 6-week strike by Public Service Electric and Gas Company workers in New Jersey, United States.

=== December ===
- 1953 French airport strike, 8-day strike by airport ground staff in France.
