= United Labour Social Democratic Party =

The United Labour Social Democratic Party (Обединена работническа социалдемократическа партия, Obedinena rabotnicheska sotsialdemokraticheska partiya, ORSDP) was a political party in Bulgaria.

== History ==
The party was established as a breakaway from the Bulgarian Social Democratic Workers' Party (Broad Socialists) following the 1923 coup, and was initially allied with the Democratic Alliance.

The party first contested national elections alone in 1931, when it ran in the National Assembly elections, but failed to win a seat.

Between 1945 and 1947 the ORSDP was allied with Bulgarian Agrarian People's Union "Nikola Petkov", with the parties running a joint list in the 1946 Constitutional Assembly election. The joint list finished in second place with 101 seats. The following year a Communist regime was established.
