= Plovdiv tobacco workers' strike =

1953 labor dispute in Bulgaria

- Date: May 3–4, 1953
- Location: Plovdiv, Bulgaria
- Goals: Stable, year-round employment 5-day workweek Re-instatement of previous bonuses
- Methods: Strike, revolt

Parties
Plovdiv tobacco workers	People's Militia

Casualties and losses
Deaths: 3 - 9 Injuries: at least 50	No data available

The Plovdiv tobacco workers' strike (Bulgarian: Пловдивска стачка на тютюноработниците) was a strike action by workers of the tobacco industry in Plovdiv, Bulgaria, on May 3–4, 1953. Triggered by the harsh working conditions and job insecurity, it resulted in a revolt and was finally suppressed by the authorities with at least 3 deaths.

== Background ==
Plovdiv had been traditionally a center for the tobacco industry since late 19th century. In 1947, the Bulgarian tobacco industry was nationalized and the rights of workers to unionize were limited in favor of the official party-affiliated unions. However, on September of the same year another tobacco workers' strike took place in Plovdiv.

At the beginning of April 1953, lists of workers who would stay employed and those who would be unemployed for the next year were published. As a result, the tobacco workers decided to organize themselves to demand full-year employment instead of seasonal one, a 5-day working week and the re-instatement of the pre-nationalization bonuses. On April 20, the workers sent their demands in writing to Prime Minister Valko Chervenkov, stating that if their demands had not been fulfilled until the beginning of May, they would leave work and protest in front of the secretariat of the State Tobacco Monopoly in Plovdiv. A strike committee, headed by the anarchist Stanyo Valev, was also elected that evening.

== Strike ==
On May 3, the night shift at the "Ivan Karadjov" warehouse, consisting mostly of women, drove out the guards and the workers barricaded themselves in the warehouse. In the early morning, the people's militia surrounded the premises and locked the outer doors. The same morning, workers from the "Stefan Kiradjiev" and "Georgi Ivanov" warehouses also stopped work. They headed to the occupied "Ivan Karadjov" warehouse, broke down the doors and chased away the militiamen, who fired a few shots into the air and retreated.

The strikers from the three warehouses held a rally in the yard of "Ivan Karadjov" where they were joined by workers of other shifts. The leaders of the strike committee Stanyo Valev, Kiril Javezov, Dimitar Baharov and Zlatka Vlaicheva assured the strikers that their cause was fair and they should make a demonstration against the monopoly secretariat. More protesters gathered around the factory and warehouses of "Thomasyan" - according to some testimonies, hundreds, according to others - thousands. At that moment, a delegation of the authorities arrived:

- Georgi Tsankov – Minister of Internal Affairs
- Anton Yugov - Minister of Industry
- Raiko Damyanov – Deputy Chairman of the Council of Ministers
- Stanko Todorov – Minister of Agriculture
- Georgi Chankov – head of the State Planning Commission, accompanied by the mayor of the city, Nikola Balkandzhiev, and the secretary of the district committee of the Bulgarian Communist Party in Plovdiv, Ivan Prumov, and guarded by policemen.

Anton Yugov was the first of them to stand on the podium. After beginning with the word "Comrades", insults and stones were thrown against him. The secretary of the district committee, Ivan Prumov, tried to protect the minister and militiamen started shooting in the air. Stanko Todorov had the same fate when he addressed the crowd.

Then Prumov ordered the militia to shoot and the militiamen began to shoot at the strikers who started to disperse. A member of the strike committee, was killed with the first shots and several other people also fell. Arrests began with the detained being stacked into trucks. The delegation of ministers is withdrew under the protection of the police.

Undercover agents of the police were also among the protesters. One of them shot the anarchist Stanyo Valev from the second floor of the factory. Strike leader Kiril Javezov was also shot near the station, with the official version being that he was killed by the protesters. Kera Valeva was run over by a police van. She died the next day at the district's hospital.

== Aftermath ==
Two of the leaders of the strike, Dimitar Baharov and Zlatka Vlaicheva, managed to escape from Bulgaria and worked at Goryanin radio, "The voice of the Bulgarian Resistance" from Athens, until its closure in 1962.

Two members of the Democratic Party, Stoicho Moshanov and Metodi Yanchulev were sentenced to 12 and 15 years in prison respectively for supposedly "having organized and supported the strike of tobacco workers in Plovdiv from May 1953, as they wanted to return the 'monopoly in tobacco' to their fellow party members, the Chaprashikov brothers".

Soon after the strike, Ivan Prumov was promoted to Minister of Agriculture, mayor Balkandzhiev was awarded the Order of Civil Valor, and the head of the Plovdiv police was elevated to the head of the "Tobacco Industry" union.
