= Dimitrovist Pioneer Organization "Septemberists" =

Part of the Bulgarian pioneer movement

Dimitrovist Pioneer Organization "Septemberists" Димитровска пионерска организация "Септемврийче"
- Emblem of the organization

- Flag of the organization
- Founded: September 1944
- Dissolved: 1990
- Succeeded by: Bulgarian Socialist Youth Union
- Membership: 700,000 (1967)
- Ideology: Communism; Marxism–Leninism
- Mother party: Bulgarian Communist Party
- National affiliation: Fatherland Front
- International affiliation: WFDY

The Dimitrovist Pioneer Organization "Septemberists" (Bulgarian: Димитровска пионерска организация "Септемврийче") was a pioneer movement in Bulgaria founded in September 1944. The DPO "Septemberists" organized children between 9 and 14 years old. Its day-to-day affairs were supervised by the Dimitrov Communist Youth Union. A 1967 estimate put its membership at about 700,000. A similar organization called the chavdarcheta existed for younger children who would later become pioneers. The two could be differentiated by their members' distinctive scarves, which were sky-blue in the chavdarcheta movement and red in the pioneri movement.

== Pledge of the organization ==
I, a Dimitrovist Pioneer, today solemnly promise to my comrades and to my heroic people to fight selflessly for the work of the Communist Party of Bulgaria, towards the victory of communism. I swear to defend and keep the legacy and promise of Georgy Dimitrov, and to comply with the laws of the Dimitrovist Pioneers. I therefore pledge to be a worthy citizen of my dear fatherland, the People's Republic of Bulgaria.

== See also ==
- Defence Assistance Organisation
