= Mara Kinkel =

Bulgarian sociologist, writer and politician

Member of the National Assembly
- In office 1945–1946

Personal details
- Born: 1885 Gabrovo, Bulgaria
- Died: 1960 (aged 74–75)

Mara Koseva Kinkel (1885–1960) was a Bulgarian sociologist, writer and politician. She was one of the first group of women elected to the National Assembly in 1945.

== Biography ==
Kinkel was born in Gabrovo in 1885. She worked as a teacher in villages near Gorna Oryahovitsa and became a member of the socialist movement. She went to Switzerland, where she studied literature and sociology in Geneva, completing her studies in 1914. While in Switzerland, she met several Russian revolutionaries, including Vladimir Lenin and Nadezhda Krupskaya.

She married professor Ivan Kinkel, and the couple lived in Russia from 1917 to 1922. She later wrote books on Lenin and Georgi Dimitrov.

Following World War II, she was a candidate in the 1945 parliamentary elections, the first in which women could stand. She was elected to the National Assembly, becoming one of the first group of women in parliament.
