= Free Trade Unions (Bulgaria) =

The Free Trade Unions (Bulgarian: свободен синдикален съюз, SSS) was a central trade union organization in Bulgaria. SSS was founded in August 1904, and was politically tied to the Bulgarian Social Democratic Workers Party (Obedinena). As of 1904, SSS had 1,188 members. By 1907 the membership had risen to 1,884.
