= Government of Bulgaria =

Bulgaria

- Министерски съвет
- Central government
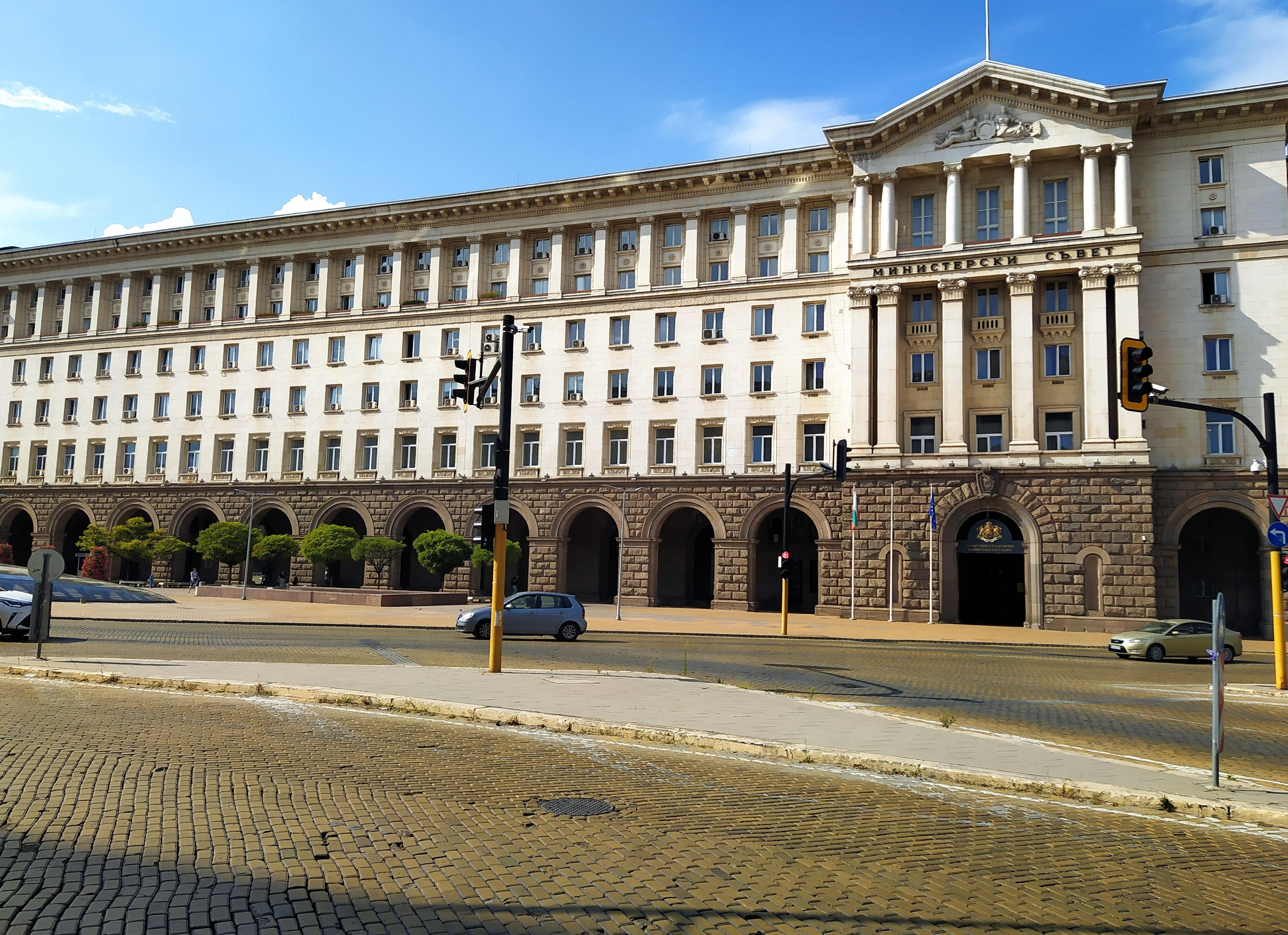
- The Council of Ministers building in central Sofia

Overview
- Established: 5 July 1879
- State: Bulgaria
- Leader: Prime Minister of Bulgaria
- Appointed by: National Assembly of Bulgaria
- Responsible to: National Assembly of Bulgaria
- Headquarters: The Largo, Sofia
- Website: https://www.gov.bg/en

The Council of Ministers (Bulgarian: Министерски съвет, Ministerski savet) is the main authority of the executive power in the Republic of Bulgaria. It consists of the Prime Minister of Bulgaria and all the specialized ministers. In its current form it was formed in 1991 and replaced the Council of Ministers of the People's Republic of Bulgaria.

== Overview ==
Bulgaria employs a dualistic approach for relations between the Parliament and the Government: after the composition of the Council of Ministers is decided by the newly elected government, the members of parliament who are chosen to become ministers temporarily lose their parliamentary rights while being ministers. These rights are restored in case they are released from the Council of Ministers or the government falls from power. This is in contrast to how deputy ministers and other government officials are treated when they are elected as deputies.

Sometimes, with the purpose of preserving the political representation of different parties or groups in the Council of Ministers, one or more ministers without portfolio (lacking a ministry of own) may be appointed.

The Council of Ministers office is in central Sofia and is part of the Largo architectural ensemble.

== Structure of the Cabinet ==
The Radev Government is the 107th and current cabinet of Bulgaria. It was elected by the 52nd National Assembly and took office on 8 May 2026, succeeding the caretaker government of Andrey Gyurov. The government is a coalition led by the Progressive Bulgaria party and features several independent experts.

== Cabinet ==
Portfolio	Minister	Took office	Left office	Party
Prime Minister	Rumen Radev	8 May 2026	Incumbent	PB
Deputy Prime Minister and Minister of Finance	Galab Donev	8 May 2026	Incumbent	PB
Deputy Prime Minister and Minister of Economy, Investments and Industry	Aleksandar Pulev	8 May 2026	Incumbent	Independent
Deputy Prime Minister for Strategic Development and Policy Coordination	Ivo Hristov	8 May 2026	Incumbent	Independent
Deputy Prime Minister for Management of European Funds	Atanas Pekanov	8 May 2026	Incumbent	Independent
Minister of Interior	Ivan Demerdzhiev	8 May 2026	Incumbent	PB
Minister of Defence	Dimitar Stoyanov	8 May 2026	Incumbent	PB
Minister of Foreign Affairs	Velislava Petrova-Chamova	8 May 2026	Incumbent	Independent
Minister of Justice	Nikolay Naydenov	8 May 2026	Incumbent	Independent
Minister of Labour and Social Policy	Nataliya Efremova	8 May 2026	Incumbent	Independent
Minister of Education and Science	Georgi Valchev	8 May 2026	Incumbent	Independent
Minister of Health	Katya Ivkova	8 May 2026	Incumbent	Independent
Minister of Innovation and Digital Transformation	Ivan Vasilev	8 May 2026	Incumbent	PB
Minister of Regional Development and Public Works	Ivan Shishkov	8 May 2026	Incumbent	PB
Minister of Energy	Iva Petrova	8 May 2026	Incumbent	Independent
Minister of Transport and Communications	Georgi Peev	8 May 2026	Incumbent	Independent
Minister of Agriculture and Food	Plamen Abrovski	8 May 2026	Incumbent	PB
Minister of Environment and Water	Rositsa Karamfilova-Blagova	8 May 2026	Incumbent	PB
Minister of Culture	Evtim Miloshev	8 May 2026	Incumbent	Independent
Minister of Tourism	Ilin Dimitrov	8 May 2026	Incumbent	Independent
Minister of Youth and Sports	Encho Keryazov	8 May 2026	Incumbent	Independent
