= Ivan Vasilev =

Ivan Vasilev may refer to:

- Ivan Vasilev (footballer, born 1967)
- Ivan Vasilev (footballer, born 2001)
