= 1971 Bulgarian parliamentary election =

- 27 June 1971
- All 400 seats in the Grand National Assembly
- Turnout: 99.85%
Party	Leader	Seats
Communist	Todor Zhivkov	268
BZNS	Georgi Traykov	100
Independents	–	32
This lists parties that won seats. See the complete results below.
Prime Minister before	Prime Minister after
Todor Zhivkov; OF	Stanko Todorov; OF

Parliamentary elections were held in Bulgaria on 27 June 1971, the first held under the new Zhivkov Constitution, which had been approved in a referendum held a month earlier. The Fatherland Front, dominated by the Bulgarian Communist Party, was the only organisation to contest the election; all candidate lists had to be approved by the Front. The Front nominated one candidate for each constituency. Of the 400 candidates 268 were members of the Communist Party, 100 were members of the Bulgarian Agrarian National Union and the remaining 32 were unaffiliated. Voter turnout was reportedly 99.9%.

== Results ==
Party or alliance		Votes	%	Seats
Fatherland; Front	Bulgarian Communist Party	6,154,082	99.98	268
Fatherland; Front	Bulgarian Agrarian National Union	6,154,082	99.98	100
Fatherland; Front	Independents	6,154,082	99.98	32
Against		1,487	0.02	–
Total		6,155,569	100.00	400
Valid votes		6,155,569	99.93	
Invalid/blank votes		4,373	0.07	
Total votes		6,159,942	100.00	
Registered voters/turnout		6,168,931	99.85	
Source: Nohlen & Stöver, IPU
