= 1981 Bulgarian parliamentary election =

- 7 June 1981
- All 400 seats in the Grand National Assembly
- Turnout: 99.96%
Party	Leader	Seats	+/–
Communist	Todor Zhivkov	271	−1
BZNS	Petar Tanchev	99	−1
Independents	–	30	+2
This lists parties that won seats. See the complete results below.
PM before	PM after
Stanko Todorov; OF	Grisha Filipov; OF

Parliamentary elections were held in Bulgaria on 7 June 1981. The Fatherland Front, dominated by the Bulgarian Communist Party, was the only organisation to contest the election; all candidate lists had to be approved by the Front. The Front nominated one candidate for each constituency. Of the 400 candidates 271 were members of the Communist Party, 99 were members of the Bulgarian Agrarian National Union and the remaining 30 were unaffiliated. Voter turnout was reportedly 99.9%.

== Results ==
Party or alliance		Votes	%	Seats	+/–
Fatherland; Front	Bulgarian Communist Party	6,519,674	99.99	271	–1
Fatherland; Front	Bulgarian Agrarian National Union	6,519,674	99.99	99	–1
Fatherland; Front	Independents	6,519,674	99.99	30	+2
Against		517	0.01	–	–
Total		6,520,191	100.00	400	0
Valid votes		6,520,191	99.94		
Invalid/blank votes		3,835	0.06		
Total votes		6,524,026	100.00		
Registered voters/turnout		6,526,782	99.96		
Source: Nohlen & Stöver
