= 1949 Bulgarian parliamentary election =

← 1946	18 December 1949	1953 →
- All 241 seats in the Grand National Assembly
- Turnout: 98.91%
Party	Leader	Vote %	Seats
OF	Vasil Kolarov	99.98	241
This lists parties that won seats. See the complete results below.
PM before	PM after
Vasil Kolarov; OF	Vasil Kolarov; OF

Parliamentary elections were held in Bulgaria on 18 December 1949. They were the first legislative elections held under undisguised Communist rule. With all meaningful opposition having been destroyed, voters were presented with a single list from the Fatherland Front, dominated by the Bulgarian Communist Party. According to official figures, almost 4.7 million people turned out to vote and only 980 of them voted against the list, while another 109,963 ballots were invalid or blank. Voter turnout was reportedly 98.9 percent.

== Results ==
Party	Votes	%	Seats
Fatherland Front	4,588,996	99.98	241
Against	980	0.02	–
Total	4,589,976	100.00	241
Valid votes	4,589,976	97.66	
Invalid/blank votes	109,963	2.34	
Total votes	4,699,939	100.00	
Registered voters/turnout	4,751,849	98.91	
Source: Nohlen & Stöver
