= Workers Youth League (Bulgaria) =

The Workers Youth League (WYL) (Bulgarian: Работнически младежки съюз, romanized: Rabotnicheski mladezhki sayuz, abbreviated RMS), often referred to as Rems, was a youth organization in Bulgaria, tied to the Bulgarian Communist Party. The organization was founded in 1928. RMS was illegalized in 1934. During the Second World War, the organization led partisan struggles. In 1938, its ranks were joined by the members of the underground Young Communist League of Bulgaria.

At the fifth RMS congress in 1945, Zhivko Zhivkov became the Secretary of its Central Committee.

In December 1947, RMS was substituted by the Popular Youth League.

== See also ==
- Dimitrov Communist Youth Union
- Dimitrovist Pioneer Organization "Septemberists"
