= Narod (Bulgarian newspaper) =

Narod was a Bulgarian socialist publication, which first appeared around 1897/1898. It was a daily published newspaper between 1911 and 1934, and functioned as the central organ of the Bulgarian Social Democratic Workers' Party (Broad Socialists) during this period.
