= 1945 Bulgarian parliamentary election =

- 18 November 1945
- All 276 seats in the National Assembly
- Turnout: 84.80%
Party	Leader	Seats	+/–
Communist	Georgi Dimitrov	94	+84
BZNS	Nikola Petkov	94	+89
Zveno	Kimon Georgiev	45	
BRSDP (Broad)	Dimitar Neykov	31	
RDP		11	
Opposition		1	
This lists parties that won seats. See the complete results below.
Prime Minister before	Prime Minister after
Kimon Georgiev; OF	Kimon Georgiev; OF

Parliamentary elections were held in Bulgaria on 18 November 1945, the country's first to feature universal suffrage for women. The Bulgarian Agrarian National Union and the Bulgarian Communist Party both won 94 seats. Voter turnout was 84.8%.

== Results ==
For the first time, women could stand as candidates, with Stoyanka Ancheva, Ekaterina Avramova, Tsola Dragoycheva, Stanka Ivanova, Tsvetana Keranova, Elena Ketskarova, Mara Kinkel, Venera Klincharova, Vyara Makedonska, Stefana Markova, Ekaterina Nikolova, Rada Todorova, Mata Tyurkedzhieva, Maria Toteva and Vera Zlatareva becoming the first women in the National Assembly.

Party	Votes	%	Seats
Bulgarian Communist Party	3,005,983	88.14	94
Bulgarian Agrarian National Union	3,005,983	88.14	94
Zveno	3,005,983	88.14	45
Bulgarian Social Democratic Workers' Party (Broad Socialists)	3,005,983	88.14	31
Radical Democratic Party	3,005,983	88.14	11
Opposition candidates	404,482	11.86	1
Total	3,410,465	100.00	276
Valid votes	3,410,465	88.23	
Invalid/blank votes	455,000	11.77	
Total votes	3,865,465	100.00	
Registered voters/turnout	4,558,332	84.80	
Source: Nohlen & Stöver
