= 1986 Bulgarian parliamentary election =

- 8 June 1986
- All 400 seats in the Grand National Assembly
- Turnout: 99.92%
Party	Leader	Seats	+/–
Communist	Todor Zhivkov	276	+5
BZNS	Petar Tanchev	99	0
Independents	–	25	−5
This lists parties that won seats. See the complete results below.
PM before	PM after
Grisha Filipov; OF	Georgi Atanasov; OF

Parliamentary elections were held in Bulgaria on 8 June 1986. The Fatherland Front, dominated by the Bulgarian Communist Party, was the only organization to contest the election; all candidate lists had to be approved by the Front. The Front nominated one candidate for each constituency. Of the 400 candidates 276 were members of the Communist Party, 99 were members of the Bulgarian Agrarian National Union and the remaining 25 were unaffiliated. Voter turnout was reportedly 99.5%.

== Results ==
Party or alliance		Votes	%	Seats	+/–
Fatherland; Front	Bulgarian Communist Party	6,639,562	99.98	276	+5
Fatherland; Front	Bulgarian Agrarian National Union	6,639,562	99.98	99	0
Fatherland; Front	Independents	6,639,562	99.98	25	–5
Against		1,142	0.02	–	–
Total		6,640,704	100.00	400	0
Valid votes		6,640,704	99.93		
Invalid/blank votes		4,941	0.07		
Total votes		6,645,645	100.00		
Registered voters/turnout		6,650,739	99.92		
Source: Nohlen & Stöver
