= 1976 Bulgarian parliamentary election =

- 30 May 1976
- All 400 seats in the Grand National Assembly
- Turnout: 99.93%
Party	Leader	Seats	+/–
Communist	Todor Zhivkov	272	+4
BZNS	Petar Tanchev	100	0
Independents	–	28	−4
This lists parties that won seats. See the complete results below.
PM before	PM after
Stanko Todorov; OF	Stanko Todorov; OF

Parliamentary elections were held in Bulgaria on 30 May 1976. The Fatherland Front, dominated by the Bulgarian Communist Party, was the only organisation to contest the election; all candidate lists had to be approved by the Front. The Front nominated one candidate for each constituency. Of the 400 candidates 272 were members of the Communist Party, 100 were members of the Bulgarian Agrarian National Union and the remaining 28 were unaffiliated. Voter turnout was reportedly 99.9%.

== Results ==
Party or alliance		Votes	%	Seats	+/–
Fatherland; Front	Bulgarian Communist Party	6,369,762	99.99	272	+4
Fatherland; Front	Bulgarian Agrarian National Union	6,369,762	99.99	100	0
Fatherland; Front	Independents	6,369,762	99.99	28	–4
Against		780	0.01	–	–
Total		6,370,542	100.00	400	0
Valid votes		6,370,542	99.93		
Invalid/blank votes		4,461	0.07		
Total votes		6,375,003	100.00		
Registered voters/turnout		6,379,348	99.93		
Source: Nohlen & Stöver, IPU
