= Bulgarian Social Democratic Workers' Party (Broad Socialists) =

1903–1946 political party in Bulgaria

Bulgarian Social Democratic Workers' Party Българска работническа социалдемократическа партия
- Leader: Yanko Sakazov; Dimitar Neykov
- Founded: 1903
- Dissolved: 1948
- Split from: BRSDP
- Merged into: BCP (Partly)
- Succeeded by: PBSD
- Newspaper: Narod; Epoha
- Youth wing: Bulgarian Socialist Youth Union
- Ideology: Social democracy Democratic socialism Reformism; Kautskyism
- Political position: Left-wing
- National affiliation: Fatherland Front (1943-1948)
- International affiliation: Labour and Socialist International

The Bulgarian Social Democratic Workers' Party (Broad Socialists) (Bulgarian: Българска работническа социалдемократическа партия (широки социалисти), Balgarska rabotnicheska sotsialdemokraticheska partiya (shiroki sotsialisti)), after 1908 Bulgarian Social Democratic Workers' Party (United) (Bulgarian: Българска работническа социалдемократическа партия (Oбединена), Balgarska rabotnicheska sotsialdemokraticheska partiya (obedinena)) was a reformist socialist political party in Bulgaria. The party emerged from a division at the Tenth Party Congress of the Bulgarian Social Democratic Workers Party held in 1903 (the other faction forming the Bulgarian Social Democratic Workers' Party (Narrow Socialists)). The 'Broad Socialist' faction had appeared inside the pre-split party around 1900, when Yanko Sakazov had started the magazine Obshto delo ('Common Action'). The Broad Socialists, analogous to the Mensheviks in the Russian Social Democratic Labour Party, argued in favour a broad social base of the party and broad class alliances.

In 1909 the Social Democratic Union 'Proletarian' of Dimitar Blagoev (a group that had been expelled from the Narrow Socialists) merged into the Broad Socialist party. The grouping would function as a leftwing tendency inside the Broad Socialist party for the years to come.

The party was divided in right, centre and left factions. Its membership had a mixed social background. As of 1910 workers constituted about 35% of the party membership. Rural workers were generally absent in the party ranks.

The party published the daily newspaper Narod between 1911 and 1934. The rightist tendency inside the party ran a newspaper of their own, Epoha, between 1923 and 1925. The Bulgarian Socialist Youth Union was the youth wing of the party. The Free Trade Unions were politically close to the party.

The party was a member of the Labour and Socialist International 1923–1940. It was represented by Sakazov in the LSI Executive during the entire existence of the International (until August 1925 Sakazov's seat was shared with the Yugoslav socialist leader Živko Topalović).

In the Bulgarian parliamentary election on 18 November 1945, the party got 31 seats (of 276). In the Constitutional Assembly election on 27 October 1946, it got 8 seats (of 465).

In 1948 the party was forced by Soviet authorities to merge into the Bulgarian Communist Party (into which the Narrow Socialists had developed). The process of verification of memberships began in June 1948, around half of the Broad Socialist party members were allowed to enter the Communist Party. The merger was finalized in December 1948.

Historiography in Socialist Bulgaria generally downplayed the Broad Socialists, repeatedly denouncing the party as 'opportunists'. The first book to be published in Socialist Bulgaria about the Broad Socialist party came in 1981, Klara Pinkas' Reformistkata sotsialdemokratsia v Balgaria. Ideologia, politika, organizatsia, 1903–1917.

In January 1990 the party was revived under the name Bulgarian Social Democratic Party.

== Electoral history ==
Election	Votes		Seats		Position
Election	#	%	#	±	Position
1908	6,114	1.31	0 / 203	Steady	Opposition
June 1911	6,230	1.12	5 / 410	▲5	Opposition
September 1911	12,715	2.52	0 / 212	▼5	Opposition
1913	55,157	10.27	19 / 204	▲19	Opposition
1914	45,235	5.92	10 / 245	▼9	Opposition
1919	84,185	13.06	38 / 236	▲28	Opposition
