= Stefan Tonchev =

Bulgarian footballer and sports functionary

Personal information
- Full name: Stefan Tonchev Vitanov
- Date of birth: 1896
- Place of birth: Varna, Kingdom of Bulgaria
- Date of death: 16 November 1916 (aged 19–20)
- Place of death: Zlatia, Kingdom of Bulgaria

Stefan Tonchev (Bulgarian: Стефан Тончев, 1896 – 16 November 1916) is a former Bulgarian football player and sports functionary.

Stefan Tonchev was born in Varna. His father, Toncho Vitanov, took part in the Russo-Turkish war as a member of the voluntary corps (opalchenie). As a teen in the "Tsar Ferdinand High school for boys" in Varna, Tonchev demonstrated his sports talents and abilities as an organiser. He was a founding member of Sport Club Sportist, which is one of the first football clubs in Bulgaria, founded in 1909. Tonchev took part in the first official match on record in Bulgarian football history against Varna rivals Atlas in 1910, which ended in a 1-0 win for Sportist. He was the main proponent for the merger of Sportist with SC Ticha which took place on 24 May 1914. Stefan Tonchev is known as one of the most ardent players and promoters of the football game. He wrote the rule book Football, rules and admonitions, which was printed by SC Ticha in 1919, three years after his death. The book was the first of its kind in Bulgaria. In 1915, Tonchev enrolled in the Military Academy and was sent to the front lines in Dobrudzha in the First World War, where he died from typhus in the autumn of 1916 in the town of Zlatia, aged 20.

For his contribution to the popularisation and development of the football game in Bulgaria, Stefan Tonchev was posthumously awarded the Honours degree of sports functionary in 1966.
