= 1962 Bulgarian parliamentary election =

- 25 February 1962
- All 321 seats in the Grand National Assembly
- Turnout: 99.71%
Party	Leader	Vote %	Seats	+/–
OF	Todor Zhivkov	99.97	321	+74
This lists parties that won seats. See the complete results below.
PM before	PM after
Anton Yugov; OF	Todor Zhivkov; OF

Parliamentary elections were held in Bulgaria on 25 February 1962. Voters were presented with a single list from the Fatherland Front, dominated by the Bulgarian Communist Party. As the Fatherland Front was the only organisation to contest the election and all candidate lists had to be approved by the Front, voters only had the option of voting for or against the Front list. Only 1,668 of the 5,462,892 valid votes were cast against the Front list. Voter turnout was reportedly 99.7%.

== Results ==
Party	Votes	%	Seats	+/–
Fatherland Front	5,461,224	99.97	321	+74
Against	1,668	0.03	–	–
Total	5,462,892	100.00	321	+74
Valid votes	5,462,892	99.93		
Invalid/blank votes	3,625	0.07		
Total votes	5,466,517	100.00		
Registered voters/turnout	5,482,607	99.71		
Source: Nohlen & Stöver
