= 1966 Bulgarian parliamentary election =

- 27 February 1966
- All 414 seats in the Grand National Assembly
- Turnout: 99.63%
Party	Leader	Vote %	Seats	+/–
OF	Todor Zhivkov	99.96	414	+93
This lists parties that won seats. See the complete results below.
PM before	PM after
Todor Zhivkov; OF	Todor Zhivkov; OF

Parliamentary elections were held in Bulgaria on 27 February 1966. Voters were presented with a single list from the Fatherland Front, dominated by the Bulgarian Communist Party. As the Fatherland Front was the only organisation to contest the election and all candidate lists had to be approved by the Front, voters only had the option of voting for or against the Front list. Only 2,089 of the 5,746,161 valid votes were cast against the Front list. Voter turnout was reportedly 99.6%.

== Results ==
Party	Votes	%	Seats	+/–
Fatherland Front	5,744,072	99.96	414	+93
Against	2,089	0.04	–	–
Total	5,746,161	100.00	414	+93
Valid votes	5,746,161	99.88		
Invalid/blank votes	6,651	0.12		
Total votes	5,752,812	100.00		
Registered voters/turnout	5,774,251	99.63		
Source: Nohlen & Stöver
