= 1953 Bulgarian parliamentary election =

- 20 December 1953
- All 249 seats in the Grand National Assembly
- Turnout: 99.48%
Party	Leader	Vote %	Seats	+/–
OF	Valko Chervenkov	99.82	249	+8
This lists parties that won seats. See the complete results below.
PM before	PM after
Valko Chervenkov; OF	Valko Chervenkov; OF

Parliamentary elections were held in Bulgaria on 20 December 1953. Voters were presented with a single list from the Fatherland Front, dominated by the Bulgarian Communist Party. As the Fatherland Front was the only organisation to contest the election and all candidate lists had to be approved by the Front (per an electoral law adopted in 1953), voters only had the option of voting for or against the Front list. Only 0.2% of vote were cast against the Front. Voter turnout was reportedly 99.5%.

== Results ==
Party	Votes	%	Seats	+/–
Fatherland Front	4,981,594	99.82	249	+8
Against	9,077	0.18	–	–
Total	4,990,671	100.00	249	+8
Valid votes	4,990,671	99.98		
Invalid/blank votes	967	0.02		
Total votes	4,991,638	100.00		
Registered voters/turnout	5,017,667	99.48		
Source: Nohlen & Stöver
