= 1946 Bulgarian Constitutional Assembly election =

- 27 October 1946
- All 465 seats in the Grand National Assembly
- Turnout: 92.61%
Party	Leader	Vote %	Seats
Communist	Georgi Dimitrov	53.88	278
BZNS (NP)–ORSDP		28.35	101
BZNS		13.43	68
BRSDP (Broad)		1.90	9
Zveno		1.68	8
RDP		0.21	1
This lists parties that won seats. See the complete results below.
PM before	PM after
Kimon Georgiev; OF	Georgi Dimitrov; OF

Constitutional Assembly elections were held in Bulgaria on 27 October 1946, electing members of the sixth Grand National Assembly, which was tasked with adopting a new constitution. The Fatherland Front, an anti-fascist coalition dominated by the Bulgarian Communist Party, had come to power in 1944 following a coup. Now that World War II was over and the monarchy abolished, the communists wanted to adopt a new constitution. They won a large majority, with 54% of the vote and 278 of the 465 seats. Voter turnout was 93%. This would be the lowest vote share that the Communists or the Fatherland Front would claim during the 43 years of the People's Republic of Bulgaria. In subsequent years, the Fatherland Front would claim to win elections with unanimous or near-unanimous support. This would be the last truly multi-party elections until 1990.

== Results ==
Party	Votes	%	Seats
Bulgarian Communist Party	2,264,852	53.88	278
BZNS (Nikola Petkov)–ORSDP	1,191,455	28.35	101
Bulgarian Agrarian National Union	564,581	13.43	68
Bulgarian Social Democratic Workers' Party (Broad Socialists)	79,774	1.90	9
Zveno	70,731	1.68	8
Democratic Party	22,736	0.54	0
Radical Democratic Party	8,868	0.21	1
Independents	298	0.01	0
Total	4,203,295	100.00	465
Valid votes	4,203,295	98.52	
Invalid/blank votes	63,319	1.48	
Total votes	4,266,614	100.00	
Registered voters/turnout	4,607,307	92.61	
Source: Nohlen & Stöver
