= Vasil Kolarov =

Bulgarian communist politician (1877–1950)

- Васил Коларов
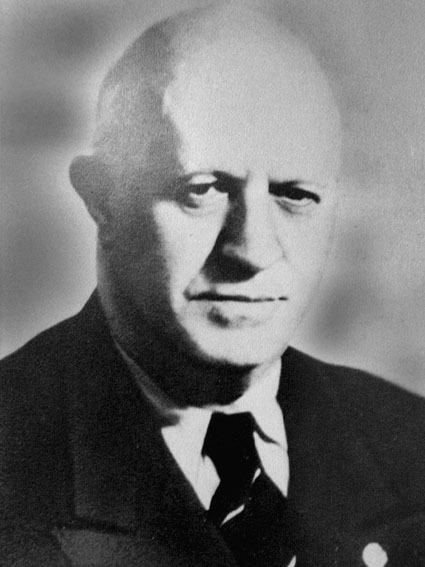

33rd Prime Minister of Bulgaria
- In office 2 July 1949 – 23 January 1950; Acting: 2 – 20 July 1949
- Preceded by: Georgi Dimitrov
- Succeeded by: Valko Chervenkov

Chairman of the Provisional Presidency of Bulgaria
- In office 15 September 1946 – 9 December 1947
- Preceded by: Simeon II (as King of Bulgaria)
- Succeeded by: Mincho Neychev (as Chairman of the Presidium of the National Assembly)

Personal details
- Born: 16 July 1877 Shumen, Ottoman Empire
- Died: 23 January 1950 (aged 72) Sofia, People's Republic of Bulgaria
- Party: BCP
- Other political affiliations: BRSDP (1897–1903); BRSDP-Narrow Socialists (1903–1919)

Military service
- Allegiance: Kingdom of Bulgaria
- Branch/service: Bulgarian Land Forces
- Rank: Second lieutenant
- Battles/wars: Balkan Wars
- De facto leader of the PRB: ← Dimitrov; Chervenkov →

Vasil Petrov Kolarov (Bulgarian: Васил Петров Коларов; 16 July 1877 – 23 January 1950) was a Bulgarian communist political leader and leading functionary in the Communist International (Comintern).

== Biography ==
=== Early years ===
Kolarov was born in Şumnu, Ottoman Empire (now Shumen, Bulgaria) on 16 July 1877, the son of a shoemaker. After graduating from high school in Varna, he worked as a teacher in Nikopol from 1895 to 1897.

In 1897, Kolarov joined the Bulgarian Workers' Social Democratic Party (BWSDP).

Kolarov studied law in Aix-en-Provence, France, and at the University of Geneva. Following his graduation in 1900, Kolarov worked as a lawyer in his hometown and, from 1904, in Plovdiv.

=== Political career ===
After the ideological split of the BWSDP, Kolarov cast his lot with Dimitar Blagoev's Tesniak (Narrow) wing of the party, which espoused revolutionary socialism. From 1904 to 1912, Kolarov headed the local Tesniak organization in Plovdiv. He was named a member of the organization's governing Central Committee in 1905. On behalf of the Tesniak organization, Kolarov was a delegate to the congresses of the Second International at Stuttgart (1907) and Copenhagen (1910).

During the Balkan Wars Kolarov served as a second lieutenant in the 13th Rila Regiment of 7th Rila Division of the Bulgarian army. In 1913, Kolarov was elected to the Bulgarian National Assembly.

Kolarov participated in the September 1915 Zimmerwald Conference but at the time he remained aloof from the revolutionary Zimmerwald Left. Kolarov was also the delegate of the Tesniak organization to the 1917 Socialist conference held in Stockholm.

In April 1919, the Bulgarian Communist Party was established, with Kolarov elected the first Secretary of its Central Committee.

In 1920, Kolarov was arrested in Romania and was thus unable to attend the 2nd World Congress of the Communist International, although he was able to attend the 3rd World Congress held in Moscow the following year as the representative of the Bulgarian Communist Party.

Kolarov was elected to the Executive Committee of the Communist International (ECCI) and became a key functionary in the Comintern. Early in 1923, he travelled to Central and Western Europe on behalf of the Comintern, attending Communist gatherings in Paris, Frankfurt, Oslo, and Prague.

In June 1923, Kolarov spoke at the 3rd Enlarged Plenum of ECCI in Moscow before returning secretly to Bulgaria at the end of the month. There he was promptly arrested but released on 5 August. Upon his release, Kolarov played a critical role along with Georgi Dimitrov in convincing the Bulgarian Communist Party to organize an insurrection in accordance with Comintern instructions. Kolarov was a member of the revolutionary committee which launched the resulting September Uprising in 1923. This attempted revolution failed and Kolarov was forced to flee to the Soviet Union by way of Yugoslavia and Austria. He remained in exile for more than two decades.

Kolarov remained a top official of the Communist International, presiding over the body's debates at the 5th World Congress of 1924. He was re-elected to the ECCI and its governing Presidium at the 5th, 6th, and 7th Congresses.

Kolarov was President of the Executive Committee of the Peasant International (Krestintern) from 1928 until its dissolution in 1939. He also served as director of the International Agrarian Institute in Moscow during this period. In 1943, Kolarov signed the document formally dissolving the Communist International.

=== Return to Bulgaria ===
Kolarov returned to Bulgaria in 1945 during its occupation by the Soviet Union, and was elected to the National Assembly again. He was reelected in 1946 and became provisional president of Bulgaria that year, amidst the growing domination of the communists. He remained president until the formation of the government headed by Dimitrov in December 1947, which he entered as deputy prime minister and Minister of Foreign Affairs.

When Dimitrov died in July 1949, Kolarov was elected to Dimitrov's old post as prime minister. He served until his own death a few months later.

=== Death and legacy ===
Kolarov died in Sofia on 23 January 1950, aged 72. His funeral was held as a state funeral and his body was buried in the Georgi Dimitrov Mausoleum.

His city of birth, Shumen, was named Kolarovgrad in his honor between 1950 and 1965.

== Footnotes ==
Political offices
Preceded by Simeon II as Tsar of Bulgaria	Chairman of the Provisional Presidency; 1946–1947	Succeeded by Mincho Neychev as Chairman of the Presidium of the National Assembly
Preceded by Georgi Dimitrov	Chairman of the Council of Ministers of Bulgaria; 1949–1950	Succeeded by Valko Chervenkov
Preceded by Kimon Georgiev	Minister of Foreign Affairs of Bulgaria; 1947–1949	Succeeded by Vladimir Poptomov
