= Anton Yugov =

Bulgarian politician

- Антон Югов
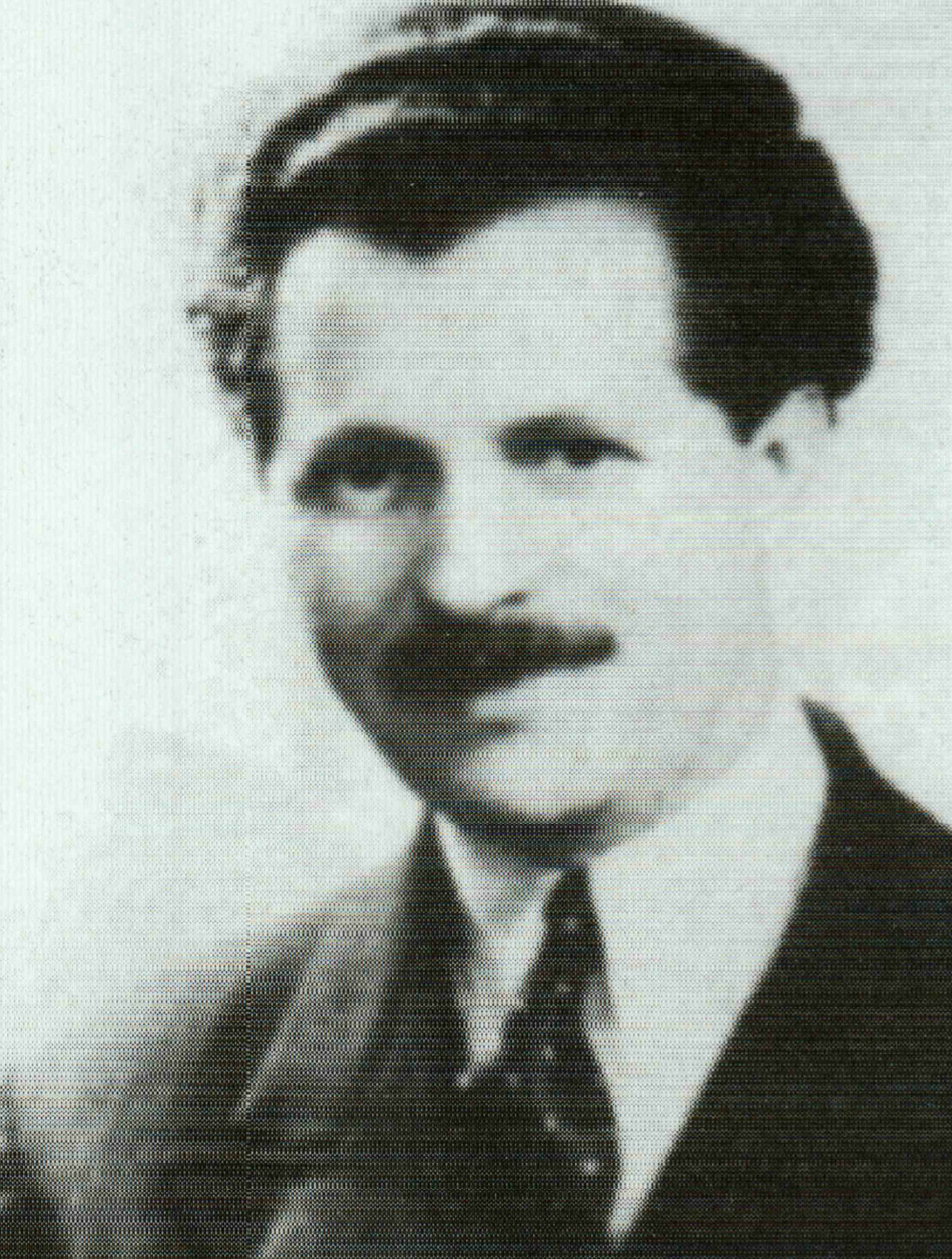
- Yugov in 1947

35th Prime Minister of Bulgaria
- In office 17 April 1956 – 19 November 1962
- Preceded by: Valko Chervenkov
- Succeeded by: Todor Zhivkov

Personal details
- Born: Anton Tanev Goshev; 5 August 1904; Rugunovec, Salonica vilayet, Ottoman Empire (now Polykastro, Greece)
- Died: 6 July 1991 (aged 86); Sofia, Bulgaria
- Political party: Bulgarian Communist Party

Anton Tanev (Dontcho) Yugov (Bulgarian: Антон Танев Югов) (5 August 1904 – 6 July 1991) was a Bulgarian politician who was a leading member of the Bulgarian Communist Party (BCP), and served as Prime Minister of the country from 1956 to 1962. He was an Honorary Citizen of Tirana, Albania.

Yugov was born to a Bulgarian family in Karasuli (Rugunovets), Ottoman Macedonia (today Polykastro, Greece). His family moved to Plovdiv after World War I.

== War years and Ministry ==
Yugov was a prominent figure in the BCP during the Second World War and attempted to reach a settlement with Marshal Josip Broz Tito in Yugoslavia regarding co-operation between both countries' communists. This 1941 initiative was aborted however as Tito would not accept the sacrifice of Macedonia, something upon which Yugov insisted. The two would revisit the issue in 1945 when they discussed the possibility of a Bulgarian-Yugoslav confederation to solve the issue although the United States and United Kingdom raised such objections to the plan that Joseph Stalin personally intervened to tell the two leaders to abandon the idea.

He served as Minister of the Interior from 1944 to 1949. As Interior Minister he oversaw a purge of the army of members of Zveno and fascist sympathisers that became noted for its brutality. Linked to Traycho Kostov, he fell with him in 1949 and, whilst Yugov was not to follow his ally to the gallows, he was nonetheless rebuked by new prime minister Valko Chervenkov for supposedly allowing Kostov's conspiracies to go unchecked.

== Comeback ==
Following the death of Stalin and the process of de-Stalinization across Eastern Europe Yugov emerged as a leading figure within the "home communist" tendency, who emphasised the importance of specifically Bulgarian communism rather than simply following Moscow in order to legitimise the regime in the eyes of the people. As part of the move away from the Stalin template, the Bulgarian government released the "April Line" of 1956, which formed the basis of Bulgarian communism for the next three decades. As well as a template for government it included such provisions as the abandonment of the cult of personality, the release of certain dissidents from prison and full rehabilitation to others, including Yugov, living under a cloud, thus allowing him to launch a full and immediate political comeback.

The home communists gained the upper hand on the Politburo and as a consequence Prime minister Valko Chervenkov, a noted Stalinist, was removed in 1956 and replaced by Yugov, who had emerged as the leading figure amongst the home party, in part because of the ruthless reputation he garnered in the interior ministry.

== Fall from grace ==
He remained in the job for six years until overall leader Todor Zhivkov also assumed this role. Yugov, who had criticised Zhivkov for allowing the Bulgarian Great Leap Forward to influence economic policy, was removed as a potential rival. His strong following amongst the home communists also meant that Zhivkov feared Yugov as a challenge to his own position and so used the economic issue as a pretext for his removal. Yugov's fate had been sealed earlier that same year when Nikita Khrushchev visited Bulgaria and publicly declared his support for Zhivkov, whilst snubbing Yugov.

He was rehabilitated on the 1990 BCP party congress.

Political offices
Preceded by Vulko Chervenkov	Prime Minister of Bulgaria; 17 April 1956 - 19 November 1962	Succeeded by Todor Zhivkov
