= Valko Chervenkov =

Bulgarian communist politician, prime minister (1900-1980)

- Вълко Червенков
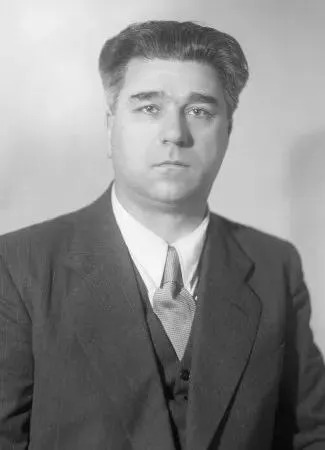
- Chervenkov in 1949

34th Prime Minister of Bulgaria
- In office 23 January 1950 – 18 April 1956; Acting to 3 February 1950
- Preceded by: Vasil Kolarov
- Succeeded by: Anton Yugov

Deputy Prime Minister of Bulgaria
- In office 20 July 1949 – 3 February 1950

General Secretary of the Central Committee of the Bulgarian Communist Party
- In office 15 July 1949 – 26 January 1954
- Preceded by: Georgi Dimitrov
- Succeeded by: Todor Zhivkov

Personal details
- Born: 6 September 1900 Zlatitsa, Principality of Bulgaria
- Died: 21 October 1980 (aged 80) Sofia, People's Republic of Bulgaria
- Party: BCP (1919–1962, 1969-1980)
- Spouse: Elena Dimitrova (sister of Georgi Dimitrov) (1902–1974)
- De facto leader of the PRB (In role with Todor Zhivkov between 1954 ans 1956): ← Kolarov; Zhivkov →

Valko Velyov Chervenkov (Bulgarian: Вълко Вельов Червенков) (6 September 1900 – 21 October 1980) was a Bulgarian communist politician. He served as leader of the Communist Party between 1949 and 1954, and Prime Minister between 1950 and 1956.

His rule was marked by the consolidation of the Stalinist model, rapid industrialisation, collectivisation and large-scale persecution of political opponents.

Stalin's death in 1953 had repercussions for his regime in Bulgaria. In 1954, Chervenkov accepted the Soviet model of collective leadership and handed over his post as party leader to Todor Zhivkov. The government also released a large number of political prisoners and directed its economic policy towards improving living standards rather than accelerating industrialization.

== Biography ==
=== Early life and career in the Soviet Union ===
Chervenkov was born in Zlatitsa, Bulgaria in to a peasant family. He became a member of the Communist Party in 1919 and participated in communist youth group activities and newspaper editing. He took part in the failed 1923 September Uprising and was sentenced to death, but was allowed to emigrate to the Soviet Union.

In 1925, Chervenkov fled to the Soviet Union. He attended the International Lenin School in Moscow and eventually became its director. He became a supporter of the governing style of Joseph Stalin and was known for his high wit and knowledge of Marxism–Leninism. He was recruited as an agent in the NKVD under the alias "Spartak". In 1941, Chervenkov became the director of a radio station which sent anti-nazi and pro-communist messages to the Bulgarian nation.

=== In Bulgaria ===
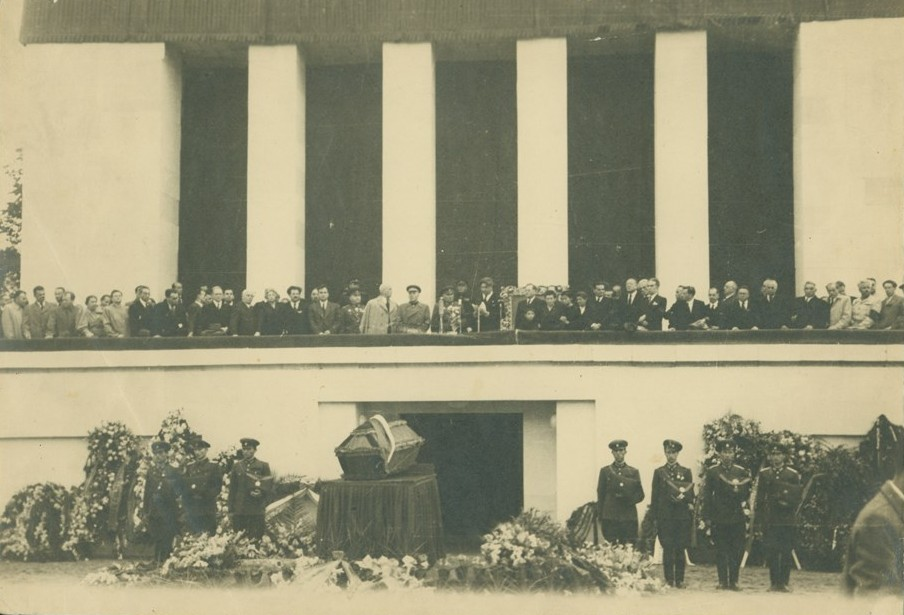
Chervenkov speaking at the tribune of Georgi Dimitrov's mausoleum. Dimitrov's coffin is put in front of the mausoleum.

In 1944, Chervenkov returned to Bulgaria on a mission for his brother-in-law, Georgi Dimitrov. Chervenkov became a member of the government which took office soon after the end of World War II in 1945 which quickly came to be controlled by Communists. He became minister of culture in 1947, and became deputy prime minister in 1949. Shortly afterwards, Bulgarian leader Georgi Dimitrov died and Bulgaria temporarily adopted a model of collective leadership. Chervenkov succeeded Dimitrov as general secretary of the party, and Vasil Kolarov took Dimitrov's other post of prime minister. This only lasted a year before Kolarov died in 1950. At that time, Chervenkov became prime minister as well and once again combined the two most powerful posts in Bulgaria, with full Soviet approval.

Chervenkov's policies closely resembled those of the Soviet Union at the time, which earned him the nickname "Little Stalin". His rule featured harsh repression of all deviation from the party line, arbitrary suppression of culture and the arts along the lines of Socialist realism, and an isolationist foreign policy. He also became the object of a personality cult. In 1950, a collectivization campaign was launched. By early 1951, Chervenkov had expelled one in five party members, including many high officials, in his campaign for complete party discipline. Out of 460,000 members, 100,000 were expelled from the party by 1953. Although Chervenkov's personality cult model was similar to that of Stalin—various places were named after him like the Medical University in Sofia and one of the city's districts—he personally accepted it only as a necessity of the current political situation and strongly opposed any extremities.

By 1953, Bulgaria had cut ties with the West and 90% of its exports and imports involved Soviet partnership. Chervenkov's cabinet used intimidation and supply discrimination to increase collectivization rates. Between 1950 and 1953, state-owned arable land increased from 12% to 61%. Despite these collectivization efforts, the 1949–1953 Five-Year Plan failed to achieve its target, marking −0.9% growth in agriculture for the period, although at the same time industry marked a 20.7% growth, while total economic growth amounted to 8.4%. Under his presidency the 1953 tobacco workers' strike in Plovdiv was violently suppressed.

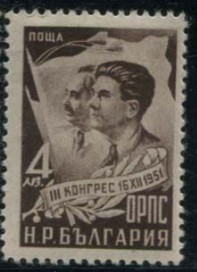
Chervenkov and Georgi Dimitrov on a 1951 Bulgarian post stamp.

Even before the death of Stalin, Chervenkov had already begun moving away from the Stalinist line. The official approval of Dimitar Dimov's novel Tobacco marked a slight loosening of Party control over cultural activities. In 1953, formal relations with Greece and Yugoslavia were re-established, some political amnesties were granted, and planners discussed increasing production of consumer goods and reducing the prices of commodities. After 1953 Chervenkov was in an insecure position, and made several steps in order to gain political support – he gave up his leadership of the Party in 1954, reduced Soviet intervention in Bulgarian economic and political life, reduced the pace of collectivisation and released some 10,000 political prisoners by 1955. In April 1956, following Khrushchev's de-Stalinisation, the Bulgarian Communist Party denounced Stalinism (and implicitly, Chervenkov's authoritarianism). He resigned the same year.

In 1961, he was banned from Politburo. In 1962, Chervenkov was expelled from the communist party for "anti-party activities", although his membership was renewed in 1969 by a suggestion from Zhivkov in the context of the Soviet crushing of the Prague Spring.

Chervenkov died in 1980 in Sofia. The communist party did not inform immediately about his death and forbade huge groups of mourners, fearing that such a ceremony may evolve into a protest against the Zhivkov rule.

== Personal life ==
In 1926 Chervenkov married Georgi Dimitrov's youngest sister, Elena. They had two children – Irina (1931–2014) and Vladimir (1935–1965).

== Honours and awards ==
- Order of Lenin, four times (including 1967 and 1980)

Party political offices
Preceded by Georgi Dimitrov	General Secretary of the Central Committee of the Bulgarian Communist Party; 1949–1954	Succeeded by Todor Zhivkov
Political offices
Preceded by Vasil Kolarov	Prime Minister of Bulgaria; 1950–1956	Succeeded by Anton Yugov
