= Fatherland Front (Bulgaria) =

1942–1989 communist political alliance

Fatherland Front Отечествен фронт
- Founder: Georgi Dimitrov
- Founded: 17 July 1942; 84 years ago
- Dissolved: June 1990; 36 years ago
- Ideology: Communism; Marxism-Leninism; Stalinism (until 1956)
- Political position: Far-left
- Colours: Red

Party flag

The Fatherland Front (Bulgarian: Отечествен фронт, ОФ, romanized: Otechestven front, OF) was a Bulgarian pro-communist political resistance movement, which began in 1942 during World War II. The Zveno movement, the communist Bulgarian Workers Party, a wing of the Bulgarian Agrarian National Union and the Bulgarian Social Democratic Workers Party all became part of the OF. The constituent groups of the OF had widely contrasting ideologies and had united only in the face of the pro-German militarist dictatorship in Bulgaria. At the beginning, the members of the OF worked together, without a single dominating group. Professional associations and unions could be members of the front and maintain their organisational independence. However, the Bulgarian Communist Party soon began to dominate. In 1944, after the Soviet Union had declared war on Bulgaria, the OF carried out a coup d'état (9 September 1944) and declared war on Germany and the other Axis powers. The OF government, headed by Kimon Georgiev of Zveno, signed a ceasefire treaty with the Soviet Union (28 October 1944). In the summer of 1945, most of BANU led by Nikola Petkov and most of the Social-Democrats had left the OF and became a large opposition group, which later on, after the 1946 Grand National Assembly election, would become a coalition named "Federation of the village and urban labour" with 99 MPs out of 465.

On November 18, 1945, the OF won a large majority in national elections. In November 1946 Georgiev resigned as Prime Minister and was succeeded by Georgi Dimitrov, leader of the communists. Bulgaria became a People's Republic on 15 September 1946 after a referendum. In 1948 and 1949, all the remaining parties in the OF save for the pro-communist wing of the BANU self-dissolved and merged into the BCP. The OF eventually transformed into a wide-ranging popular front under overall Communist control.

From 1947 onward, the Fatherland Front was effectively the only legally permitted political organization in Bulgaria. Voters were presented with a single list from the Front at all elections from 1949 to 1986, with official figures showing well over 99 percent of voters approving the list. With the fall of communism in Bulgaria, the Fatherland Front was dissolved in 1990.

== Chairmen of the National Council ==
- Georgi Dimitrov (1942–1949)
- Valko Chervenkov (1949–1956)
- Encho Staykov (1956–1967)
- Boyan Bulgaranov (1967–1972)
- Georgi Traikov (1972–1974)
- Pencho Kubadinski (1974–1989)
- Zhivko Zhivkov (1989–1990)

== Members ==
Name	Emblem	Ideology	Leader	Foundation	Seats in the Grand National Assembly (1986)
Bulgarian Communist Party; Българска комунистическа партия Balgarska komunisticheska partiya		Communism Marxism-Leninism Stalinism (until 1956)	Todor Zhivkov (longest-serving)	28 May 1919	276 / 400
Bulgarian Agrarian National Union; Български земеделски народен съюз Bŭlgarski Zemedelski Naroden Sayuz		Agrarian socialism	Georgi Traykov (1947–1974) Petar Tanchev (1974–1989)	30 December 1899	99 / 400

== Electoral history ==
=== Grand National Assembly elections ===
Election	Votes	%	Seats	+/–
1949	4,588,996	99.98%	241 / 241	▲241
1953	4,981,594	99.82%	249 / 249	▲8
1957	5,204,027	99.96%	247 / 247	▼2
1962	5,461,224	99.97%	321 / 321	▲74
1966	5,744,072	99.96%	414 / 414	▲93
1971	6,154,082	99.98%	400 / 400	▼14
1976	6,369,762	99.99%	400 / 400	Steady
1981	6,519,674	99.99%	400 / 400	Steady
1986	6,639,562	99.98%	400 / 400	Steady
1990	32,192	0.53%	2 / 400	▼398
