= Bulgarian Communist Party =

Ruling party of Bulgaria from 1946 to 1990

Bulgarian Communist Party Българска комунистическа партия
- Abbreviation: BKP/БКП
- General Secretary: Dimitar Blagoev (first); Aleksandar Lilov (last)
- Founded: 28 May 1919
- Dissolved: 3 April 1990; 36 years ago
- Preceded by: BSDWP (NS)
- Succeeded by: Bulgarian Socialist Party
- Headquarters: Party House, Largo, Sofia
- Newspaper: Rabotnichesko Delo
- Youth wing: Dimitrov Communist Youth Union
- Pioneer wing: Dimitrovist Pioneer Organization
- Armed wing: Military Organisation of the BCP (1920–1925); Bulgarian People's Army (1952–1990)
- Membership: 1,000,000 (1989 est.)
- Ideology: Communism; Marxism–Leninism
- National affiliation: Fatherland Front (1942–1990)
- European affiliation: Balkan Communist Federation (1921–1939)
- International affiliation: Comintern (1919–1943); Cominform (1947–1956)
- Anthem: The Internationale

Party flag

The Bulgarian Communist Party (Bulgarian: Българска комунистическа партия (БΚП), Romanised: Bŭlgarska komunisticheska partiya; BKP) was the founding and ruling party of the People's Republic of Bulgaria from 1946 until 1990, when the country ceased to be a socialist republic. The party had dominated the Fatherland Front, a coalition that took power in 1944, late in World War II, after it led a coup against Bulgaria's tsarist regime in conjunction with the Red Army's crossing of the border. It controlled its armed forces, the Bulgarian People's Army.

The BCP was organized on the basis of democratic centralism, a principle introduced by the Russian Marxist scholar and leader Vladimir Lenin, which entails democratic and open discussion on policy on the condition of unity in upholding the agreed-upon policies. The highest body of the BCP was the Party Congress, convened every fifth year. When the Party Congress was not in session, the Central Committee was the highest body, but since the body normally met only once a year, most duties and responsibilities were vested in the Politburo and its Standing Committee. The party's leader held the offices of General Secretary.

The ideology of the BCP was Marxism-Leninism. In the 1960s, the BCP announced economic reforms, which allowed the free sale of production that exceeded planned amounts. The BCP gradually developed an openly nationalistic policy against its Muslim and Turkish minorities and went much further in this direction than any other Eastern European communist regime. After Soviet Premier Mikhail Gorbachev took power in 1985, the BCP underwent political and economic liberalization, which led to the liquidation of the party and dissolved the People's Republic of Bulgaria completely. After the end of the BCP, the party was renamed to the Bulgarian Socialist Party in 1990, although Bulgaria retained its socialist-era constitution until 1991 along with its Warsaw Pact membership until its dissolution that same year.

== History ==
=== Origins ===
The party's origins lay in the Bulgarian Social Democratic Workers' Party (Narrow Socialists) (Tesni Sotsialisti, "Narrow Socialists"), which was founded in 1903 after a split in the 10th Congress of the Bulgarian Social Democratic Workers' Party.

The party's founding leader was Dimitar Blagoev, who was the driving force behind the formation of the BSDWP in 1894. It comprised most of the hardline Marxists in the Social Democratic Workers' Party. The party opposed World War I and was sympathetic to the October Revolution in Russia. Under Blagoev's leadership, the party applied to join the Communist International upon its founding in 1919. Upon joining the Comintern the party was reorganised as the Communist Party of Bulgaria.

Georgi Dimitrov was a member of the party's Central Committee from its inception in 1919 until his death in 1949, also serving as Bulgaria's leader from 1946. In 1938 the party merged with the Bulgarian Workers' Party and took the former party's name.

=== Ruling party ===
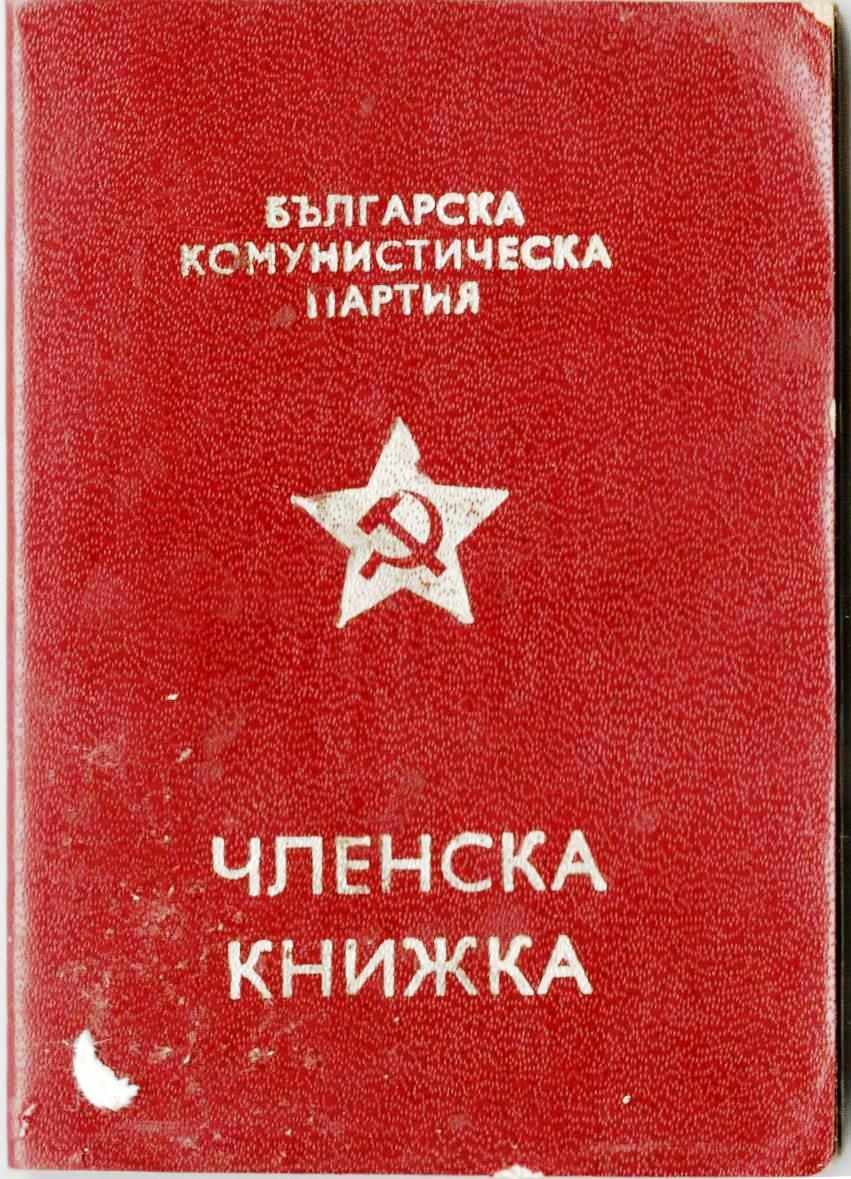
Membership card to the BCP

Following Dimitrov's sudden death, the party was led by Valko Chervenkov, a Stalinist who oversaw a number of party purges that met with Moscow's approval. The party joined the Cominform at its inception in 1948 and conducted purges against suspected Titoists following the expulsion of the Communist Party of Yugoslavia from the alliance. Suspected counter-revolutionaries were imprisoned. In 1948 the Bulgarian Social Democratic Workers' Party (Broad Socialists) was forced to merge into the BKP, thus liquidating any left-wing alternative to the communists.

In March 1954, one year after Joseph Stalin's death, Chervenkov was deposed.

From 1954 until 1989 the party was led by Todor Zhivkov, who was very supportive of the Soviet Union and remained close to its leadership after Nikita Khrushchev was deposed by Leonid Brezhnev. His rule led to relative political stability and an increase in living standards. The demands for democratic reform which swept Eastern Europe in 1989 led Zhivkov to resign. He was succeeded by a considerably more liberal Communist, Petar Mladenov. On 11 December Mladenov announced the party was giving up its guaranteed right to rule. For all intents and purposes, this was the end of Communist rule in Bulgaria, though it would be another month before the provision in the constitution enshrining the party's "leading role" was deleted.

=== Post-1990 ===
The party moved in a more moderate direction, and by the spring of 1990 was no longer a Marxist-Leninist party. That April, the party changed its name to the Bulgarian Socialist Party (BSP). A number of hardline Communists established several splinter parties with a small number of members. One of these parties, named Communist Party of Bulgaria (Komunisticeska Partija na Balgarija), is led by Aleksandar Paunov.

== Headquarters ==
The Party House (Партийния дом, Partiyniya dom) served as the headquarters of the Bulgarian Communist Party, located at the Largo. The Party House building was designed by a team under architect Petso Zlatev and was completed in 1955.

== Leaders ==
=== Chairman of the Communist Party of Bulgaria ===
Chairman			Term of office			Notes
Nº	Portrait	Name (Born–Died)	Took office	Left office	Duration	Notes
1		Dimitar Blagoev (1856–1924)	1919	1924		
2		Vasil Kolarov (1877–1950)	1924	1933		
3		Georgi Dimitrov; Георги Димитров (1882–1949)	1933	27 December 1948		

=== General Secretaries of the Bulgarian Communist Party (1948–1990) ===
General Secretary			Term of office			Notes
Nº	Portrait	Name (Born–Died)	Took office	Left office	Duration	Notes
1		Georgi Dimitrov; Георги Димитров (1882–1949)	27 December 1948	2 July 1949	187 days	Also Prime Minister (1946–1949)
2		Valko Chervenkov; Вълко Червенков (1900–1980)	2 July 1949	4 March 1954	4 years, 245 days	Also Prime Minister (1950–1955)
3		Todor Zhivkov; Тодор Живков (1911–1998)	4 March 1954	10 November 1989	35 years, 251 days	Also Prime Minister (1962–1971), and chairman of the Council of State (1971–1989)
4		Petar Mladenov; Петър Младенов (1936–2000)	10 November 1989	2 February 1990	84 days	Also chairman of the Council of State (1989–1990)

=== Chairmen of the Bulgarian Communist Party (1990) ===
Chairman			Term of office			Notes
Nº	Portrait	Name (Born–Died)	Took office	Left office	Duration	Notes
1		Aleksandar Lilov; Александър Лилов (1933–2013)	2 February 1990	3 April 1990	60 days	Also Member of the Parliament (1962–2001)

== Organizational structure ==
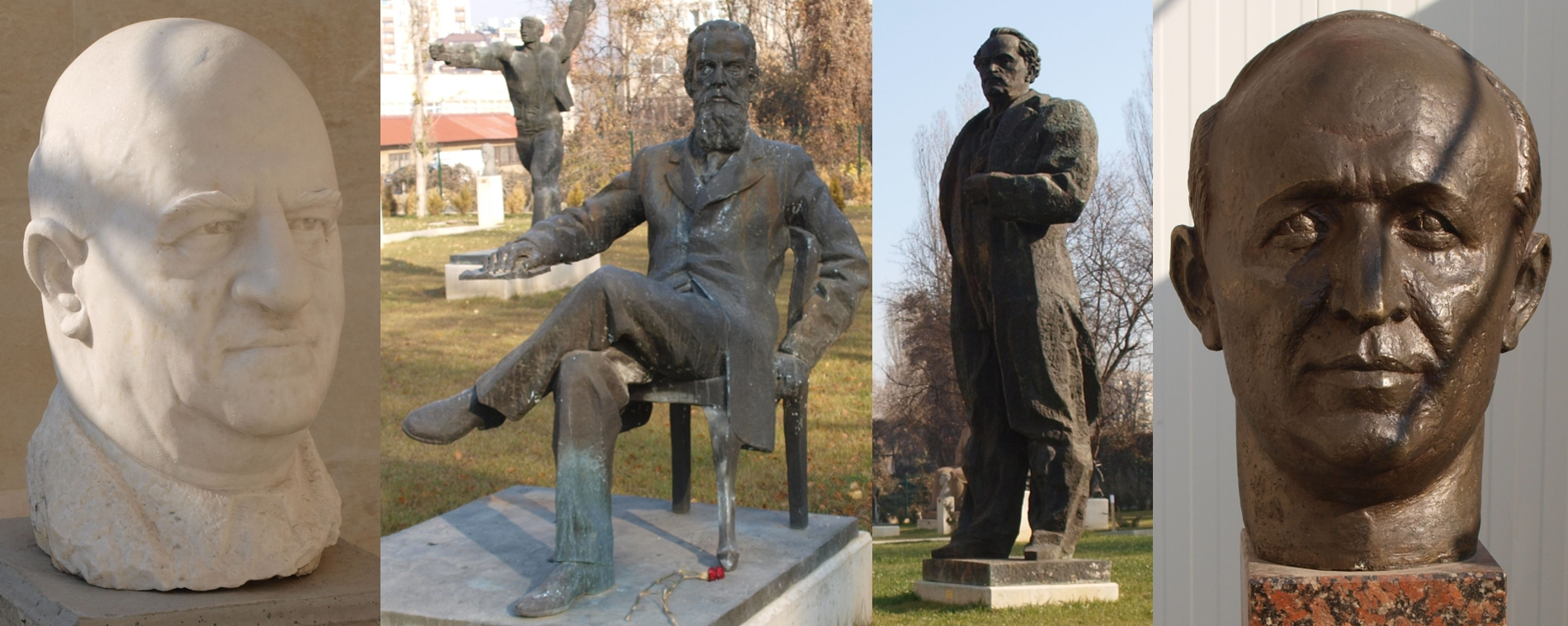
Sculptures of the communist Bulgarian leaders in the Museum of Socialist Art in Sofia: Vasil Kolarov, Dimitar Blagoev, Georgi Dimitrov and Todor Zhivkov.

=== Party congresses ===
Congresses and national conferences adopt the program and statutes of the party, approve the accounts of the past periods, develop directives and decisions for further activity. They elect the central governing bodies of the party.

=== Central Committee ===
The Central Committee of the BKP is the highest governing body that operates between congresses.

== Electoral history ==
Election	Party leader	Votes		Seats		Position
Election	Party leader	#	%	#	±	Position
1908	Dimitar Blagoev	1,505	0.32	0 / 203	Steady	Opposition
June 1911	Dimitar Blagoev	9,220	1.66	1 / 410	▲1	Opposition
September 1911	Dimitar Blagoev	12,850	2.55	0 / 212	▼1	Opposition
1913	Dimitar Blagoev	54,217	10.10	18 / 204	▲18	Opposition
1914	Dimitar Blagoev	43,251	5.66	11 / 245	▼7	Opposition
1919	Dimitar Blagoev	119,395	18.52	47 / 236	▲36	Opposition
1920	Dimitar Blagoev	184,616	20.39	50 / 229	▲3	Opposition
April 1923	Dimitar Blagoev	203,972	19.27	16 / 245	▼34	Opposition
November 1923	Dimitar Blagoev	8,437	0.84	0 / 247	▼16	Opposition
1927	Vasil Kolarov	29,210	2.53	0 / 261	Steady	Opposition
1931	Vasil Kolarov	168,281	13.01	31 / 273	▲31	Opposition
1938	Georgi Dimitrov	Banned				Opposition
1939	Georgi Dimitrov	Banned				Opposition
1945	Georgi Dimitrov	as part of the Fatherland Front		94 / 276	▲94	Coalition
1946	Georgi Dimitrov	2,264,852	53.88	278 / 465	▲184	Majority
1949	Georgi Dimitrov	as part of the Fatherland Front				Majority
1953	Valko Chervenkov	as part of the Fatherland Front				Majority
1957	Todor Zhivkov	as part of the Fatherland Front				Majority
1962	Todor Zhivkov	as part of the Fatherland Front				Majority
1966	Todor Zhivkov	as part of the Fatherland Front				Majority
1971	Todor Zhivkov	as part of the Fatherland Front		268 / 400	▼146	Majority
1976	Todor Zhivkov	as part of the Fatherland Front		272 / 400	▲4	Majority
1981	Todor Zhivkov	as part of the Fatherland Front		271 / 400	▼1	Majority
1986	Todor Zhivkov	as part of the Fatherland Front		276 / 400	▲5	Majority
1990	Petar Mladenov	as part of the Fatherland Front		2 / 400	▼274	Opposition

== See also ==
- Buzludzha
- Eastern Bloc politics
- History of Bulgaria
- List of communist parties
