= Christian Rakovsky =

Bulgarian-born Soviet diplomat (1873–1941)

Christian Rakovsky Кръстьо Раковски (Bulgarian) Христиан Раковский (Russian)
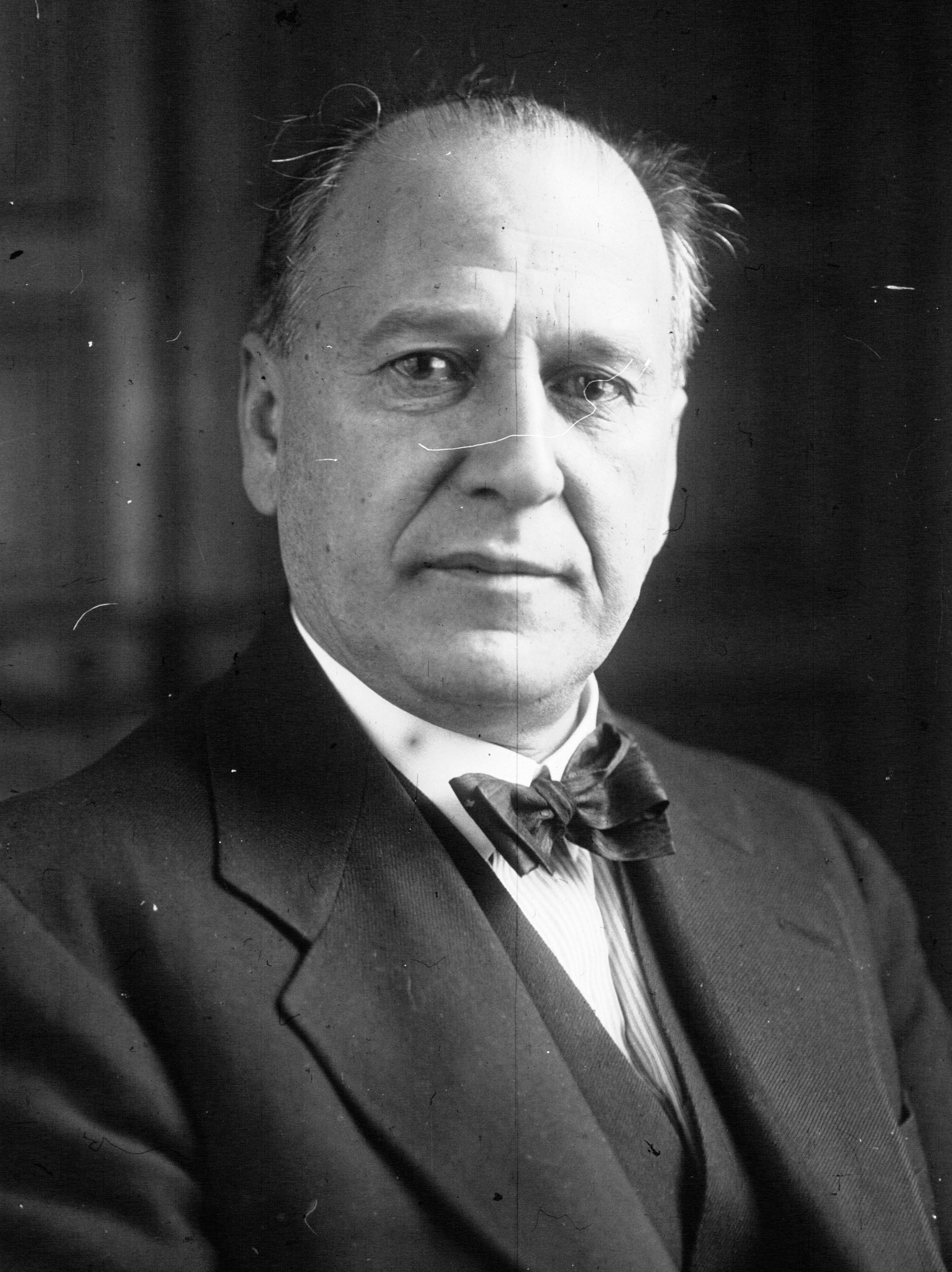
- Rakovsky in 1925

1st Chairman of the Council of People's Commissars of the Ukrainian SSR
- In office 16 January 1919 – 15 July 1923
- Preceded by: Georgiy Pyatakov
- Succeeded by: Vlas Chubar

Soviet Ambassador to France
- In office 30 October 1925 – 21 October 1927
- Premier: Alexei Rykov
- Preceded by: Leonid Krasin
- Succeeded by: Valerian Dovgalevsky

Personal details
- Born: Krastyo Georgiev Stanchev; 13 August 1873 Gradets, Ottoman Empire (now Bulgaria)
- Died: 11 September 1941 (aged 68) Oryol, Russian SFSR, Soviet Union
- Cause of death: Execution by firing squad
- Party: Russian Communist Party (1917–1937)
- Other political affiliations: Social Democratic Party of Romania (1910–1917)
- Spouse(s): E. P. Ryabova (desc.); Alexandrina Alexandrescu (Ileana Pralea)
- Education: University of Geneva
- Profession: Physician, journalist

Christian Georgiyevich Rakovsky (Note: Russian: Христиа́н Гео́ргиевич Рако́вский, romanized: Khristian Georgiyevich Rakovsky Bulgarian: Кръстьо Георги́ев Рако́вски Ukrainian: Христия́н Гео́ргійович Рако́вський, romanized: Khrystyian Heorhiiovych Rakovskyi) (13 August [O.S. 1 August] 1873 – September 11, 1941), Bulgarian name Krastyo Georgiev Rakovski, born Krastyo Georgiev Stanchov, was a Bulgarian-born socialist revolutionary, a Bolshevik politician and Soviet diplomat and statesman; he was also noted as a journalist, physician, and essayist. Rakovsky's political career took him throughout the Balkans and into France and Imperial Russia; for part of his life, he was also a Romanian citizen.

A lifelong collaborator of Leon Trotsky, he was a prominent activist of the Second International, involved in politics with the Bulgarian Workers' Social Democratic Party, Romanian Social Democratic Party, and the Russian Social Democratic Labour Party. Rakovsky was expelled at different times from various countries as a result of his activities, and, during World War I, became a founding member of the Revolutionary Balkan Social Democratic Labor Federation while helping to organize the Zimmerwald Conference. Imprisoned by Romanian authorities, he made his way to Russia, where he joined the Bolshevik Party after the October Revolution, and unsuccessfully attempted to generate a communist revolution in the Kingdom of Romania. Subsequently, he was a founding member of the Comintern, served as head of government in the Ukrainian SSR, and took part in negotiations at the Genoa Conference.

He came to oppose Joseph Stalin and rallied with the Left Opposition, being marginalized inside the government and sent as Soviet ambassador to London and Paris, where he was involved in renegotiating financial settlements. He was ultimately recalled from France in autumn 1927, after signing his name to a controversial Trotskyist platform which endorsed world revolution. Credited with having developed the Trotskyist critique of Stalinism as "bureaucratic centrism", Rakovsky was subject to internal exile. Submitting to Stalin's leadership in 1934 and being briefly reinstated, he was nonetheless implicated in the Trial of the Twenty One (part of the Moscow Trials), imprisoned, and executed by the NKVD during World War II. He was rehabilitated in 1988, during the Soviet Glasnost period.

== Names ==
Rakovsky's original Bulgarian name was Krastyo Georgiev Stanchev (Кръстьо Георгиев Станчев), which he himself changed to Krastyo Rakovski (Кръстьо Раковски), being a grandnephew of the Bulgarian national hero Georgi Rakovski. The usual form his first name took in Romanian was Cristian (occasionally rendered as Christian), while his last name was spelled Racovski, Racovschi, or Rakovski. His given name was occasionally rendered as Ristache, an antiquated hypocoristic—he was known as such to his acquaintance, writer Ion Luca Caragiale.

In Russian, his full name, including patronymic, was Khristian Georgievich Rakovsky (Христиан Георгиевич Раковский). Christian (as well as Cristian and Kristian) is an approximate rendition of Krastyo (the Bulgarian for "cross"), as used by Rakovsky himself. In Ukrainian, Rakovsky's name is rendered as Християн Георгійович Раковський, and usually transliterated as Khrystyian Heorhiiovych Rakovskyi.

During his lifetime, he was also known under the pseudonyms H. Insarov and Grigoriev, which he used in signing several articles for the Russian-language press.

== Biography ==
=== Revolutionary beginnings ===
Christian Rakovsky was born to a wealthy Bulgarian family in Gradets — near Kotel — at the time still part of Ottoman-ruled Rumelia. He was, on his mother's side, the grandnephew of Georgi Sava Rakovski, a revolutionary hero of the Bulgarian National Revival; that side of his family also included Georgi Mamarchev, who had fought against the Ottomans in the Imperial Russian Army. Rakovsky's father was a merchant who belonged to the Democratic Party.

He later stated that, as early as his childhood years, he had felt a special admiration towards Russia, and that he had been impressed by witnessing, at age 5, the Russo-Turkish War and Russian presence (he claimed to have met General Eduard Totleben during the conflict).

Although his parents moved to the Kingdom of Romania in 1880, settling in Gherengic (Northern Dobruja), he completed his education in newly emancipated Bulgaria. Rakovsky was expelled from the gymnasium in Gabrovo for his political activities (in 1887 and then again, after organizing a riot, in 1890). It was around that time that he became a Marxist, and began collaborating with the socialist journalist Evtim Dabev, whom he aided in printing works by Karl Marx and Friedrich Engels (at the time, Rakovsky and Sava Balabanov published their own newspaper, the clandestine Zerkalo).

Since, after having ultimately been banned from attending any public school in the country, he could not complete his education in Bulgaria, in September 1890, Rakovsky went to Geneva to begin his studies and become a physician. While in Switzerland, he joined the Socialist Student Circle at the University of Geneva, which was largely composed of non-Swiss youth.

A polyglot, Rakovsky became close to Georgy Plekhanov, the founder of Russian Marxism, and his circle, eventually writing a number of articles and a book in Russian. He briefly worked with Rosa Luxemburg, Pavel Axelrod, and Vera Zasulich. Unable to attend the First International Congress of Socialist Students in Brussels (1892), he became involved in organizing the Second Congress, held in Geneva during the fall of 1893.

He was a founding editor of the Geneva-based Bulgarian-language magazine Sotsial-Demokrat and later a major contributor to the Bulgarian Marxist publications Den', Rabotnik, and Drugar. At the time, Rakovsky and Balabanov, with Plekhanov's encouragement, stressed the importance for moderation in socialist policies—Sotsial-Demokrat rallied with the Bulgarian Social Democratic Union and rejected the more radical Bulgarian Social Democratic Party. He soon became involved in distributing socialist propaganda inside Bulgaria, at a time when Stefan Stambolov organized a crackdown on political opposition.

Later in 1893, Rakovsky enrolled in a medical school in Berlin, contributing articles for Vorwärts and becoming close to Wilhelm Liebknecht (the two corresponded regularly for the rest of Liebknecht's life). As a Bulgarian delegate to the Second International Congress in Zürich, he also met with Engels and Jules Guesde.

Six months later, he was arrested and expelled from the German Empire for maintaining close contacts with the Russian revolutionaries there. He finished his education in 1894–1896 in Zürich, Nancy and Montpellier, where he wrote for La Jeunesse Socialiste and La Petite République, maintaining a friendship with Guesde and becoming an opponent of Jean Jaurès' reformist views.

According to his own testimony, he became active in supporting the Anti-Ottoman upsurge in Crete and Macedonia, as well as Dashnak revolutionary activities. In 1896, he was the Bulgarian representative to the Second International's London Congress (part of his speech was published in Karl Kautsky's Die Neue Zeit).

=== Military service and first stay in Russia ===
Although actively involved in many European countries' socialist movements, prior to 1917 Rakovsky's focus remained on the Balkans and especially on his native country and Romania; his activities in support of the international socialist movement led to his expulsion, at different times, from Germany, Bulgaria, Romania, France and Russia.

In 1897, he published Russiya na Istok (Russia in the East), a book sharply critical of the Russian Empire's foreign policy, which, according to Rakovsky, followed one of Georgy Plekhanov's guidelines ("Tsarist Russia must be isolated in its foreign relations"). On several occasions, he publicly criticized Russia's policies towards Romania and in Bessarabia (describing Russia's rule over the latter as "absolutist conquest", "mischievous action", and "abduction"). According to Rakovsky, "Russophile papers" in Bulgaria had begun to target him as a consequence.

After completing his education as a physician at the University of Montpellier (with the thesis L'Éthiologie du crime et de la dégénérescence – "The Cause of Crime and Degeneration", submitted in 1897), Rakovsky, who had married the Russian student E. P. Ryabova, was summoned to Romania in order to be drafted in the Romanian Army, and served as a medic in the 9th Cavalry Regiment stationed in Constanţa, Dobruja (1899–1900). He rose to the rank of lieutenant.

Rakovsky subsequently rejoined his wife in Saint Petersburg, where he hoped to settle down and engage in revolutionary activities (he was probably expelled after an initial attempt to enter the country, but was allowed to return). An adversary of Peter Berngardovich Struve after the latter moved towards market liberalism, he became acquainted with, among others, Nikolay Mikhaylovsky and Mikhail Tugan-Baranovsky, while authoring articles for Nashe Slovo and helping distribute Iskra. His close relationship with Plekhanov led Rakovsky to a position between the Menshevik and Bolshevik factions of the Russian Social Democratic Labor Party, one he kept from 1903 to 1917; the Bolshevik leader Vladimir Lenin was initially hostile to Rakovsky, and at one point wrote to Karl Radek that "we [the Bolsheviks] do not have the same road as his kind of people".

Initially, Rakovsky was expelled from Russia and had to move back to Paris. Returning to the Russian capital in 1900, he remained there until 1902, when his wife's death and the crackdown on socialist groups ordered by Emperor Nicholas II forced him to return to France. Working for a while as a physician in the village of Beaulieu, Haute-Loire, he asked French officials to review his case for naturalization, but was refused.

In 1903, following the death of his father, Rakovsky again lived in Paris, where he followed developments of the Russo-Japanese War and spoke out against Russia, attracting, according to Rakovsky himself, the criticism of both Plekhanov and Jules Guesde. He voiced his opposition to the concession made by Karl Kautsky to Jean Jaurès, one which had allowed socialists to join "bourgeois" governments in times of crisis.

=== România Muncitoare ===
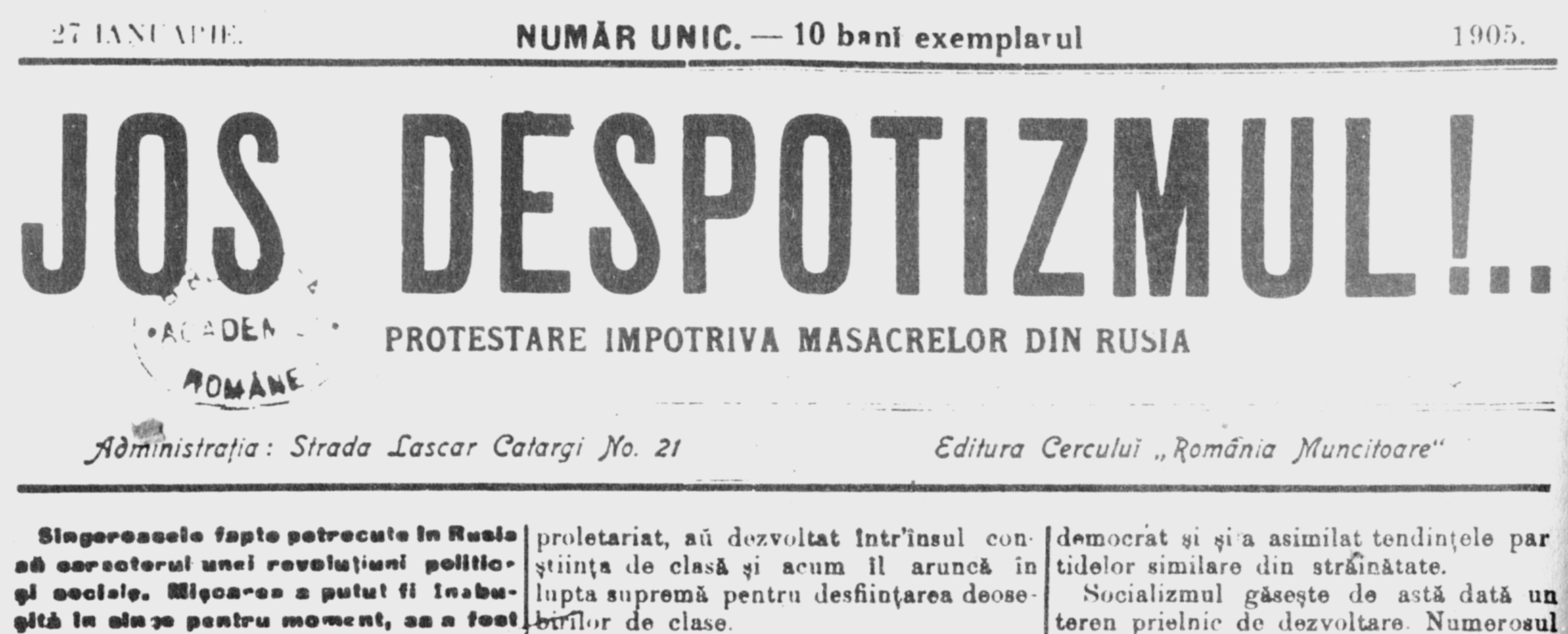
Front page of Jos Despotizmul!.. ("Down with Despotism!!!"), a special issue of România Muncitoare, entirely dedicated to criticism of the Imperial Russian authorities (February 1905)

He ultimately settled in Romania (1904) having inherited his father's estate near Mangalia. In 1913, his property, valued at some 40,000 United States dollars at the time, was home to Leon Trotsky when the latter visited the Balkans as a press envoy during the Balkan Wars. He was usually present in Bucharest on a weekly basis, and started an intense activity as a journalist, doctor and lawyer. The Balkans correspondent for L'Humanité, he was also personally responsible for reviving România Muncitoare, the defunct journal of the Romanian socialist group, provoking successful strike actions which brought him to the attention of officials.

Christian Rakovsky also traveled to Bulgaria, where he eventually sided with the Tesnyatsi in their conflict with other socialist groups. In 1904, he was present at the Second International's Congress in Amsterdam, where he gave a speech celebrating the assassination of Russian police chief Vyacheslav von Plehve by Socialist-Revolutionary Party members.

Rakovsky became noted locally especially after 1905, when he organized rallies in support of the Battleship Potemkin revolt (the events worsened relations between Russia and the Romanian Kingdom), carried out a relief operation for the Potemkin crew as their ship sought refuge in Constanţa, and attempted to persuade them to set sail for Batumi and aid striking workers there. According to his own account, a parallel scandal occurred when an armed Bolshevik ship was captured in Romanian territorial waters; Rakovsky, who indicated that the weapons on board were to be used in Batumi, faced allegations in the Romanian press that he was preparing a Dobrujan insurrection.

His head was injured during street clashes with police forces over the Potemkin issue; while recovering, Rakovsky befriended the Romanian poets Ștefan Octavian Iosif and Dimitrie Anghel, who were publishing works under a common signature—one of the two authored a sympathetic portrait of the socialist leader, based on his recollections from the early 1900s. Throughout these years, Rakovsky, was, according to Iosif and Anghel, "continuously bustling; disappearing and appearing in workers' centers, be it in Brăila, be it in Galaţi, be it in Iaşi, be it anywhere, always preaching with the same undaunted fervor and fanatical conviction his social credo".

Rakovsky was drawn into a polemic with the Romanian authorities, facing public accusations that, as a Bulgarian, he lacked patriotism. In return, he commented that, if patriotism meant "race prejudice, international and civil war, political tyranny and plutocratic domination", he refused to be identified with it. Upon the outbreak of Romanian Peasants' Revolt of 1907, Rakovsky was especially vocal: he launched accusations at the National Liberal government, arguing that, having profited from the early antisemitic message of the revolt, it had violently repressed it from the moment peasants began to attack landowners. Supportive of the thesis according to which the peasantry had revolutionary importance inside Romanian society and Eastern Europe at large, Rakovsky publicized his perspective in the socialist press (writing articles on the subject for România Muncitoare, L'Humanité, Avanti!, Vorwärts and others).

Rakovsky was also one of the journalists suspected of having greatly exaggerated the overall death toll in their accounts: his estimates speak of over 10,000 peasants killed, whereas the government data counted only 421.

He became close to the influential dramatist Ion Luca Caragiale, who was living in Berlin at the time. Caragiale authored his own virulent critique of the Romanian state and its handling of the revolt, an essay titled 1907, din primăvară până în toamnă ("1907, From Spring to Autumn"), which, in its final version, adopted some of Rakovsky's suggestions.

=== 1907 expulsion ===
After repeatedly condemning repression of the revolt, Rakovsky was, together with other socialists, officially accused of having agitated rebellious sentiment, and consequently expelled from Romanian soil (late 1907). He received news of this action while already abroad, in Stuttgart (at the Seventh Congress of the Second International). He decided not to recognize it, and contended that his father had settled in Northern Dobruja before the Treaty of Berlin that had awarded the region to Romania; the plea was rejected by the Court of Appeal, based on evidence that Rakovsky's father was not in Dobruja before 1880, and that Rakovsky himself used a Bulgarian passport when moving across borders. During the 1920s, Rakovsky was still viewing the incident as a "blatantly illegal act".

The action itself caused protests from leftist politicians and sympathizers, including, among others, the influential Marxist thinker Constantin Dobrogeanu-Gherea (whose appeal in favor of Rakovsky was described by Iosif and Anghel as evidence of "an almost parental love"). The local socialists organized several rallies in his support, and the return of his citizenship was also backed by Take Ionescu's opposition group, the Conservative-Democratic Party. In exile, Rakovsky authored the pamphlet Les persécutions politiques en Roumanie ("Political Persecutions in Romania") and two books (La Roumanie des boyars – "Boyar Romania", and From the Kingdom of Arbitrariness and Cowardice - in Romanian Din regimul arbitrarului şi laşităţei (Contribuţiune la Istoria Oligarhiei Române)).

Eventually, he traveled back into Romania in October 1909, only to be arrested upon his transit through Brăila County.

According to his recollections, he was for long left stranded on the border with Austria-Hungary, as officials in the latter country refused to let him pass; the situation had to be settled by negotiations between the two countries. Also according to Rakovsky, the arrest was hidden by the Ion I. C. Brătianu cabinet until it leaked to the press — this, coupled with rumors that he was about to be killed, and Brătianu's statement that he would "rather destroy [Rakovsky] than let [him] back into Rumania", caused a series of important street clashes between his supporters and government forces. On 9 December 1909, a Romanian Railways employee named Stoenescu attempted to assassinate Brătianu. The event, which was attributed by Rakovsky to support for his return and by other sources to government manipulation, caused a clampdown on România Muncitoare (among those socialists arrested and interrogated were Gheorghe Cristescu, I. C. Frimu, and Dumitru Marinescu).

Rakovsky secretly returned to Romania in 1911, giving himself up in Bucharest. According to Rakovsky, he was again expelled, holding a Romanian passport, to Istanbul, where he was swiftly arrested by the Young Turks government but released soon after. He subsequently left for Sofia, where he established the Bulgarian socialist journal Napred. Ultimately, the new Petre P. Carp Conservative cabinet agreed to allow his return to Romania, following pressures from the French Premier Georges Clemenceau (who answered an appeal by Jean Jaurès). According to Rakovsky, this was also determined by the Conservative change in policies towards the peasantry. He unsuccessfully ran for Parliament during the elections of that year (and several others in succession), being fully reinstated as a citizen in April 1912. Romanian journalist Stelian Tănase contends that the expulsion had instilled resentment in Rakovsky; earlier, the leading National Liberal politician Ion G. Duca himself had argued that Rakovsky was developing a "hatred for Romania".

=== PSDR and Zimmerwald Movement ===
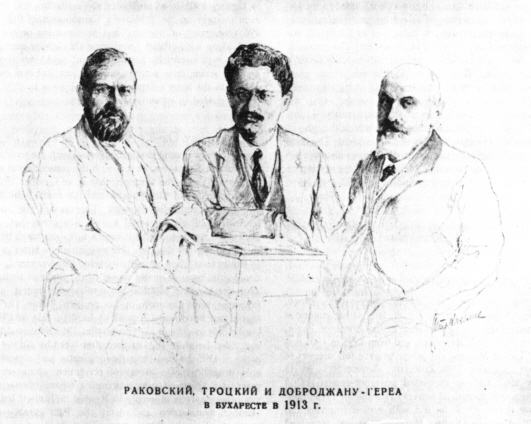
From left: Rakovsky, Leon Trotsky, and Constantin Dobrogeanu-Gherea, during a meeting in Bucharest (1913 drawing)

Alongside Mihai Gheorghiu Bujor and Frimu, Rakovsky was one of the founders of the Romanian Social Democratic Party (PSDR), serving as its president.

In May 1912, he helped organize a mourning session for the centennial of Russian rule in Bessarabia, and authored numerous new articles on the matter. He was afterwards involved in calling for peace during the Balkan Wars; notably, Rakovsky expressed criticism of Romania's invasion of Bulgaria during the Second Balkan War, and called on Romanian authorities not to annex Southern Dobruja. Alongside Frimu, Bujor, Ecaterina Arbore and others, he lectured at the PSDR's propaganda school during the short period the latter was in existence (in 1910 and again in 1912–1913).

In 1913, Rakovsky was married a second time, to Alexandrina Alexandrescu (also known as Ileana Pralea), a socialist militant and intellectual, who taught mathematics in Ploieşti. Alexandrescu was herself a friend of Dobrogeanu-Gherea and an acquaintance of Caragiale. She had previously been married to Filip Codreanu, a Narodnik activist born in Bessarabia, with whom she had a daughter, Elena, and a son, Radu.

Rallying with the left wing of international social democracy during the early stages of World War I, Rakovsky later indicated that he had been purposely informed of the controversial pro-war stance taken by the Social Democratic Party of Germany by the pro-Entente Romanian Foreign Minister Emanoil Porumbaru. With staff of the Menshevik paper Nashe Slovo (edited by Leon Trotsky), he was among the most prominent socialist pacifists of the period. Reflecting his ideological priorities, România Muncitoare's title was changed into Jos Răsboiul! ("Down with war!")—it was later to be known as Lupta Zilnică (the "Daily combat").

Heavily critical of the French Socialist Party's decision to join the René Viviani cabinet (deeming it "an abdication"), he stressed the responsibility of all European countries in provoking the war, and adhered to Trotsky's vision of a "Peace without indemnities or annexations" as an alternative to "imperialist war". According to Rakovsky, tensions between the French SFIO and the German Social Democrats were reflecting not just context, but major ideological differences.

Present in Italy in March 1915, he attended the Milan Congress of the Italian Socialist Party, during which he attempted to persuade it to condemn irredentist goals. In July, after convening the Bucharest Conference, he and Vasil Kolarov established the Revolutionary Balkan Social Democratic Labor Federation (comprising the left-leaning socialist parties of Romania, Bulgaria, Serbia and Greece), and Rakovsky was elected first secretary of its Central Bureau.

Subsequently, together with the Italian Socialist delegates (Oddino Morgari, Giacinto Menotti Serrati, and Angelica Balabanoff among them), Rakovsky was instrumental in convening the anti-war international socialist Zimmerwald Conference in September 1915. During the congress, he came into open conflict with Lenin, after the latter voiced the Zimmerwald Left's opposition to the resolution (at one point, Rakovsky reportedly lost his temper and grabbed Lenin, causing him to temporarily leave the hall in protest). Later, he continued to mediate between Lenin and the Second International, a situation from which emerged a circular letter that complemented the Zimmerwald Manifesto while being more radical in tone. In October 1915, he reportedly did not protest Bulgaria's entry into the war — this information was contradicted by Trotsky, who also indicated that the Tesniatsy had been the target of a government crackdown at that exact moment.

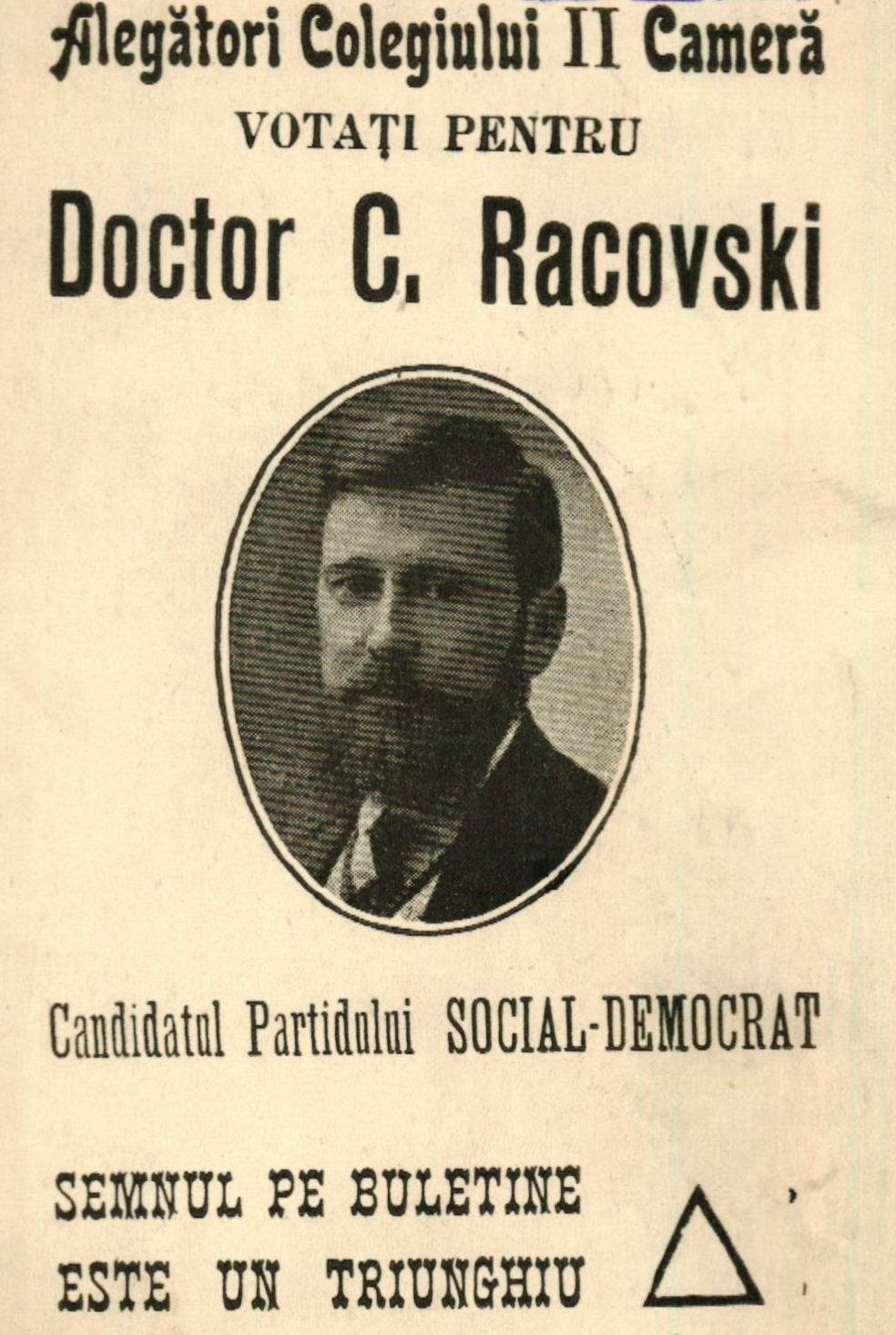
Advertising, Parliamentary elections, 1916

Rakovsky ran for Parliament for a final time during 1916, and again lost when contesting a seat in Covurlui County. Again arrested in 1916, after being accused of planning rebellion during a violent incident in Galaţi, he was, according to his own account, freed by a general strike which constituted "an outburst of indignation among the workers". Evaluating the situation in Romania, he identified the two main pro-Entente political forces of the moment, the groups led by Take Ionescu and Nicolae Filipescu, with, respectively, "corruption" and "reaction".

Suspicions also rose that he had been contacted by German intelligence, that his 1915 trip to Italy had served German interests, and that he was being subsidized with German money. Rakovsky also drew attention to himself after welcoming to Bucharest the pro-German maverick socialist Alexander Parvus. His independence was consequently challenged by the interventionist paper Adevărul, a former socialist venue, who called Rakovsky "an adventurer without scruples", and viewed him as employed by Parvus and other German socialists.

Rakovsky himself alleged that, "under the mask of independence", Adevărul and its editor Constantin Mille were in the pay of Take Ionescu. After Romania's entry into the conflict on the side of the Entente in August 1916, having failed to attend the Kienthal Conference due to the closure of borders, he was placed under surveillance and ultimately imprisoned in September, based on the belief that he was acting as a German spy.

As Bucharest fell to the Central Powers during the 1916 campaign, he was taken by Romanian authorities to their refuge in Iaşi. Held until after the February Revolution, he was freed by the Russian Army on May 1, 1917, and immediately left for Odessa.

=== October Revolution ===
Rakovsky moved to Petrograd (the new name of Saint Petersburg) in the spring of 1917. His anti-war activism almost got him arrested; Rakovsky managed to flee in August, and was present in Stockholm for the Third Zimmerwald Conference; he remained there and, with Karl Radek, issued propaganda material in support of the Russian revolutionaries. Present in the internationalist faction of the Mensheviks, he joined the Bolsheviks in December 1917 or early 1918, after the October Revolution (although he was occasionally listed among the Old Bolsheviks). Rakovsky later stated that he had friendly relations with the Bolsheviks from early autumn 1917, when, during the attempted putsch of Lavr Kornilov, he was hidden by these in Sestroretsk.

His rise in influence and his approval of world revolution led him to seek Lenin's support for a Bolshevik government over Romania, at a time when a similar attempt was being made by the Odessa-based Romanian Social Democratic Action Committee, under the guidance of Mihai Gheorghiu Bujor; Stelian Tănase claims that during the period, a group of one hundred Russian Bolsheviks had infiltrated Iaşi with the goal of assassinating King Ferdinand I and organizing a coup. Eventually, Lenin decided in favor of a unified project, and called on Bujor and Rakovsky to form a single leadership (which also included the Romanian expatriates Alecu Constantinescu and Ion Dic Dicescu).

As the coup was under preparation in December 1917, Rakovsky was present on the border and waiting a signal to enter the country. When Bolsheviks were arrested and the move was overturned, he was probably responsible for ordering the arrest of Romania's representative to Petrograd, Constantin I. Diamandy, and his entire staff (all of whom were used as hostages, pending the release of prisoners taken in Iaşi). Trotsky, who was by then Russia's People's Commissar for Foreign Affairs (Foreign Minister), called on the Romanian government of Ion I. C. Brătianu to hand in persons captured, indicating that he would otherwise encourage the communist activities of Romanian refugees on Russian soil, and receiving a reply according to which no such arrests had occurred.

As Russia negotiated the Treaty of Brest-Litovsk with Germany, he ordered Rumcherod troops to march towards Romania, which was by then giving in to the German advances and preparing to sign its own peace. Initially stalled by a much-criticized temporary armistice with Romanian Army leader Alexandru Averescu, Rakovsky ordered a fresh offensive in Moldavia, but had to retreat when the Central Powers, confronted with Trotsky's refusal to accept their version of a Russo-German peace, began their own military operation and occupied Odessa (setting free Romanians who had been imprisoned there). On 9 March 1918, Rakovsky signed a treaty with Romania regarding the evacuation of troops from Bessarabia, which Stelian Tănase claims allowed for the Moldavian Democratic Republic to join Romania. In May, Romania conceded to the demands of the Central Powers (see Treaty of Bucharest, 1918).

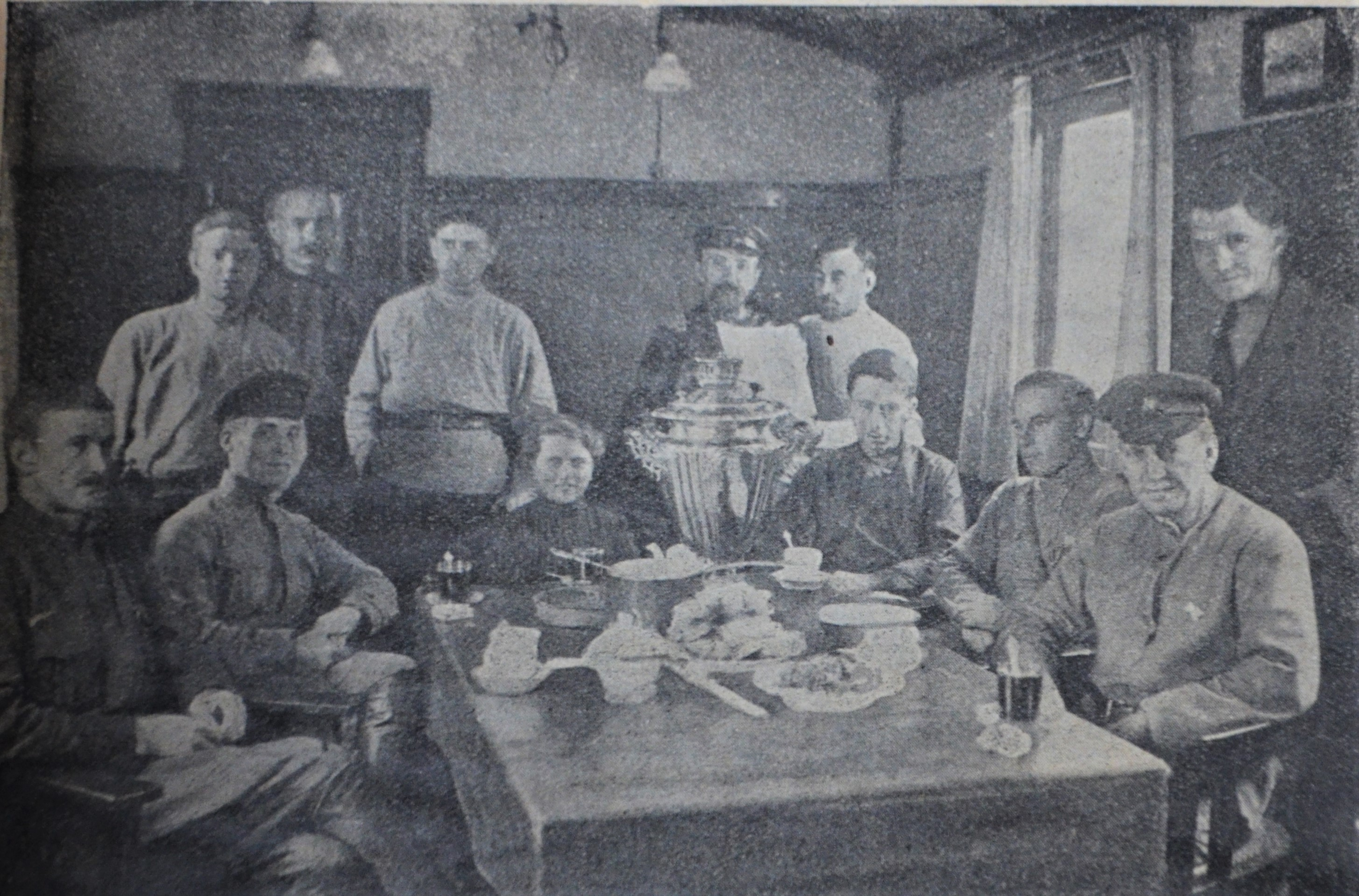
Rakovsky (seated, far right) in Ukraine, 1920

In April–May 1918, he negotiated with the Tsentral'na Rada of the Ukrainian People's Republic, then with the Hetmanate of Pavlo Skoropadsky, as well as with German forces (see Ukraine after the Russian Revolution). Soon after, Rakovsky left for Austria (where the First Republic had been proclaimed), being received by Foreign Minister Victor Adler (a member of Karl Renner's Social Democratic Party of Austria cabinet). Rakovsky's real goal was to reach Germany and negotiate the situation in Ukraine, but he was expelled upon arrival to that country.

Escorted, together with Adolph Joffe and Nikolai Bukharin, to the German-aligned Belarusian Democratic Republic, he caught news of the collapse of the German Empire and was selected as a delegate to the German workers' councils. He and all other envoys were arrested by German soldiers in Kaunas, and sent to Minsk, then to Homyel, before making their way to Moscow.

=== Second Ukrainian government ===
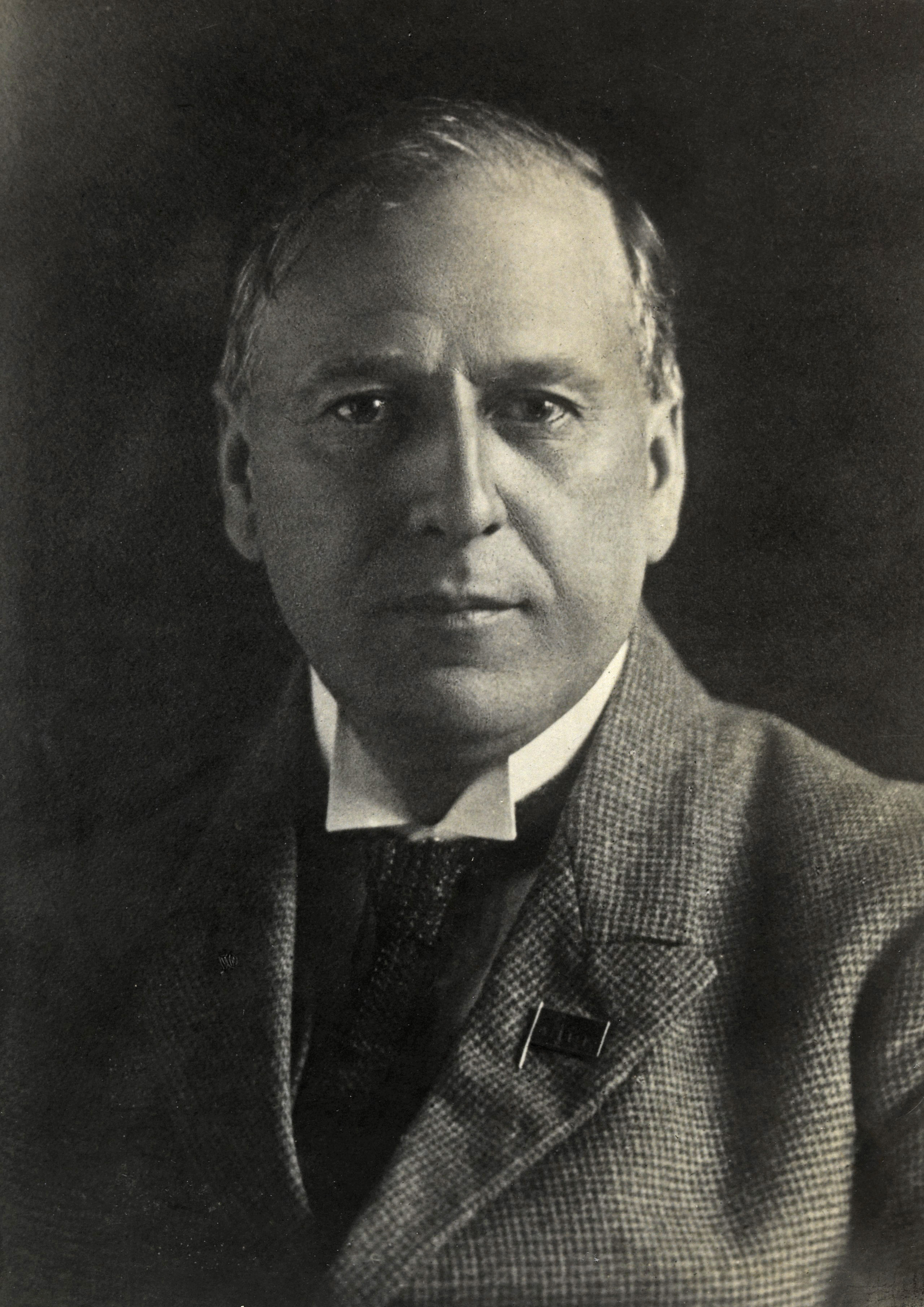
Rakovsky as Chairman of the Council of People's Commissars of Ukraine c. 1919–1923

After the subsequent Soviet offensive in Ukraine, Lenin appointed Rakovsky as the Chairman of the Provisional Revolutionary Government of the Workers and Peasants of Ukraine, replacing Georgy Pyatakov on 16 January 1919 due to the latter's argument with Fyodor Sergeyev for excessive interference in Ukrainian affairs. On 29 March 1919, the government was reorganized as the Soviet of the People's Commissars. According to the British author Arthur Ransome, present in Moscow during early that year, "It had been found that the views of the Pyatakov government were further left than those of its supporters, and so Pyatakov had given way to Rakovsky who was better able to conduct a more moderate policy". While in office, Rakovsky ignored the Ukrainian "national question" because of his view on the nationalist movements as a counter-revolutionary force, as Rakovsky believed that national issues were important during the bourgeois era, but that they would lose its importance during the emerging world revolution. He seemed unaware of the dangers of Russian nationalism and chauvinism and claimed that the "danger of Russification under the existing Ukrainian Soviet authority is entirely without foundation", although he changed his stance in the early 1920s

At the time, Rakovsky assessed the situation created by the Treaty of Versailles, and advised his superiors to build warm relations with both Mustafa Kemal's Turkey and the Weimar Republic, as a camp of countries dissatisfied with policies of the Allied Powers. Rakovsky subscribed to the Bolshevik condemnation of Greater Romania, stance that journalist Victor Frunză considered a revision of his previous views on Bessarabia.

During the Paris Peace Conference, the Romanian delegation attributed the shortage in supply in Bessarabia and Transylvania a Bolshevik conspiracy centered on Rakovsky; various French reports of the time gave contradictory assessments (while some credited Rakovsky with direct influence on Soviet foreign policy, others dismissed the notion that Russia had any such projects).

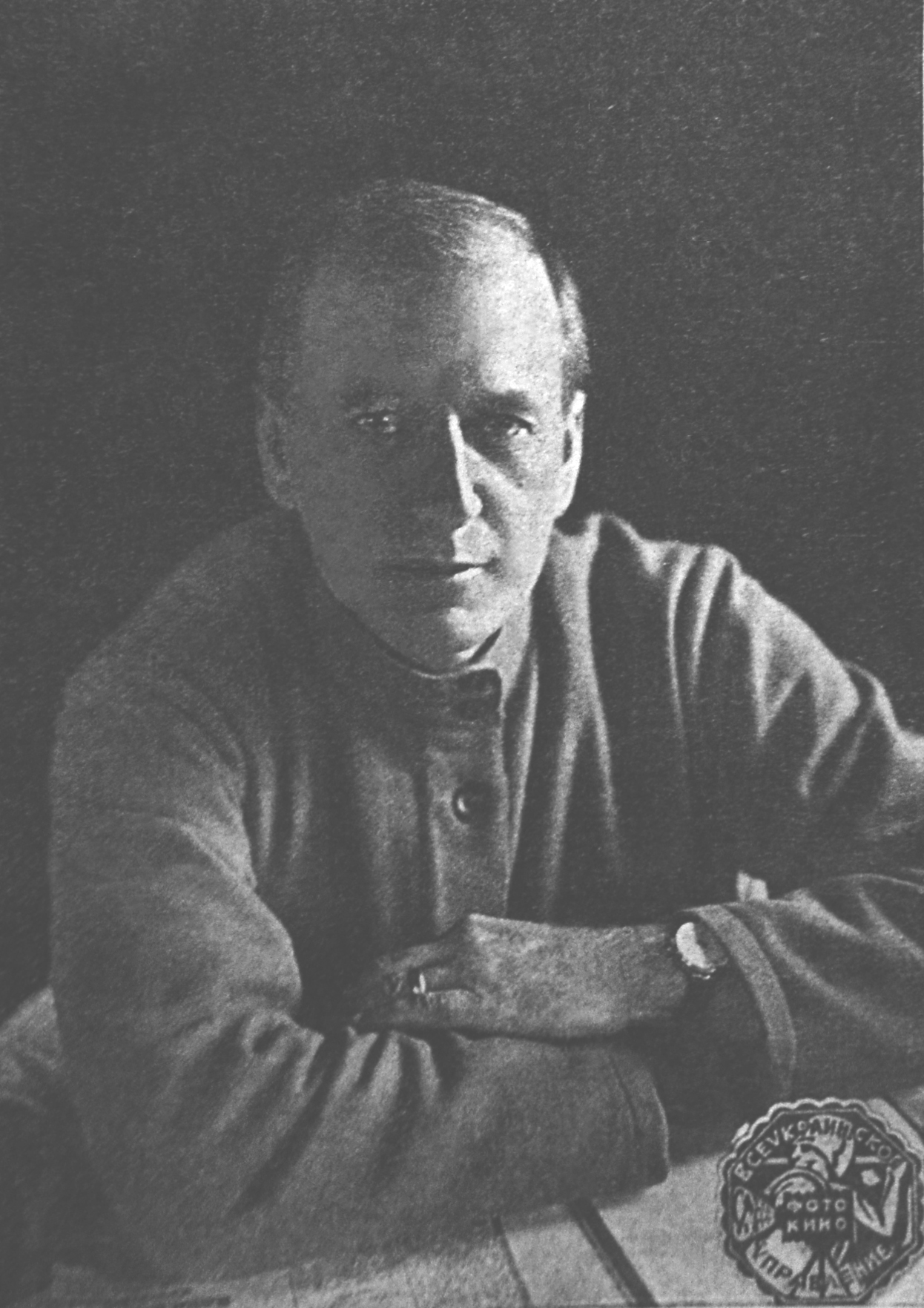
Christian Rakovsky 1923, First Chairman of the Council of People's Commissars (Prime Minister) of the Ukrainian SSR.

Rakovsky simultaneously served as Soviet Ukraine's Commissar for Foreign Affairs and a member of the South West Front's Revolutionary Military Council, contributing to the defeat of the White Army and Ukrainian nationalists during the Russian Civil War, while theorizing that "Ukraine was a laboratory of internationalism" and "a decisive factor in world revolution". Rakovsky's presence was also decisive in rallying the dissident Borotbists to the Bolshevik faction's central bodies—he was subsequently confronted with a degree of Borotbist opposition inside his government. According to American politologist Jerry F. Hough, his appointment and policies were evidence of Russification, a program requested by Lenin himself; Rakovsky's view contrasted with that supported by Stalin, who, at the time, was calling for increased Ukrainianization.

On 13 February 1919, in a session of Kyiv City Council, and later in March 1919, during the Third All-Ukrainian Congress of Soviets, Rakovsky as a head of Ukrainian government stated that "decreeing the Ukrainian language as a state language is reactionary and unnecessary", as there is no need to declare state languages in Soviet republics; according to him, all languages are equal in Soviet Ukraine, and "no decrees are needed to make the language spoken by the vast majority of the population the de facto dominant language... I must state to you that we had to issue a reprimand to the Commissar of Posts and Telegraphs, who... issued an order that political affairs at the Post and the Telegraph should be conducted exclusively in the Russian language."

In March 1919, Rakovsky was a founding member of the Comintern, where he represented the Balkan Communist Federation. During those months, when control over the entire Ukraine was made possible by the offensive against Directorate forces, he expressed his support for the Yekaterinoslav wing of the Ukrainian Communist Party—following its wishes, he subordinated the Ukrainian Communists to the Russian Communist Party and argued that a separate Central Committee was "luxury" for such a small grouping.

In summer, as Rakovsky's government briefly lost control of Ukraine, his policies became hotly contested by partisans of Ukrainian autonomy inside the Party, who held a conference in Homyel (one which Rakovsky did not attend). At the Fourth Congress of the Ukrainian Party (March 1920), the leadership of Rakovsky, Stanislav Kosior, and Dmitry Manuilsky was not reelected. Attacks on them caused problems with the Russian Party; as Lenin himself sided with Rakovsky, a delegation comprising Trotsky, Lev Kamenev and Adolph Joffe left for Kyiv to discuss the matter with local leaders. In order to curb the crisis, the Ukrainian Party was subjected to a major purge, during which pro-autonomy opposition was removed from its ranks and the former leaders were reinstated.

At the time, Rakovsky and Georgy Chicherin received harsh criticism from the Hungarian communist leaders Béla Kun, for allegedly refusing aid to the Hungarian Soviet Republic and thus contributing to its fall. This appears not to have been true, as Rakovsky reportedly urged Lenin to finance Kun even as the latter faced the intervention of troops from both Romania and Czechoslovakia.

Lenin wrote back to Kun informing him that the Central Committee was satisfied with the way in which Rakovsky and Chicherin had carried out their mission.

=== Reinstating of Soviet dominance and international conferences ===
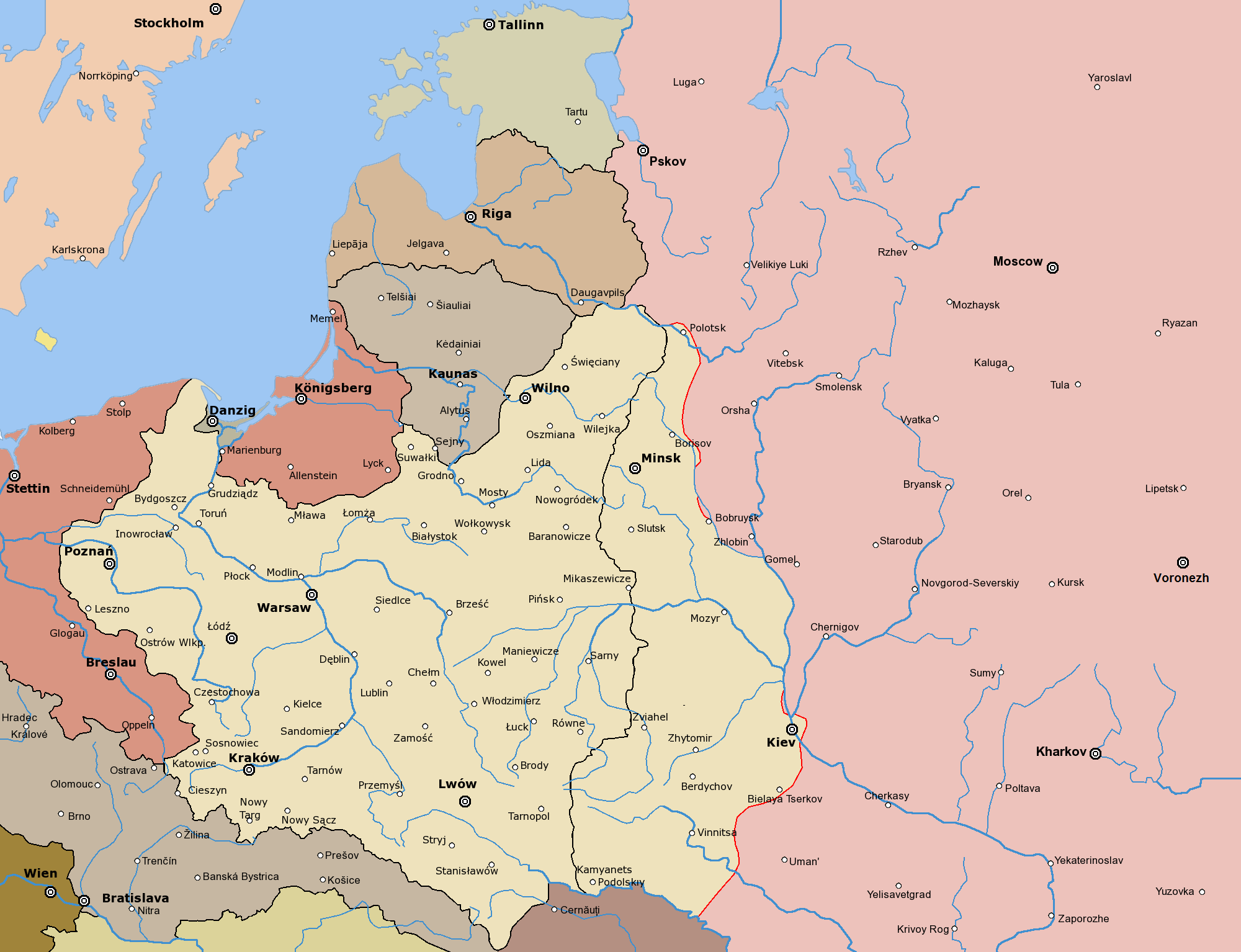
1920 theater of war: farthest advances of Polish and Ukrainian People's Republic Directorate forces during the Kyiv offensive

After dealing with the common offensive of the Directorate and Polish forces—the Kyiv offensive (see Polish-Soviet War in 1920) — Rakovsky's government took measures regarding collectivization; according to his biographer Gus Fagan, he became himself a proponent of greater Ukrainian autonomy, and advocated both Ukrainization through the complete integration of Borotbists into Party structures and a slower pace in communization. He notably came into conflict with the Russian Party after his second executive had its independent Commissariat of Foreign Trade replaced with an office under the control of central authorities. He continued to pressure for a measure of independence in Ukrainian economy, and, during the early 1920s, the republic sealed its own trade agreements with other European countries.

Rakovsky remained a Romanian citizen for the entire period. In 1921, he was officially summoned to be tried by a court-martial for "crime against the security of the Romanian state". He was sentenced to death in absentia (1924). Journalist Victor Frunză claims this move had been prompted by a supposed similar verdict given by a Soviet Court to Ion Inculeţ (who had led the Moldavian Democratic Republic's Legislative Assembly that voted union with Romania). As the Socialist Party of Romania delegation (Gheorghe Cristescu, Eugen Rozvan, David Fabian, Constantin Popovici, Ioan Flueraş, and Alexandru Dobrogeanu-Gherea) voted to adhere to the Comintern, Rakovsky and Grigory Zinoviev pressured the group to expel those of its members who supported Greater Romania (including Flueraş and Popovici, as well as Iosif Jumanca and Leon Ghelerter).

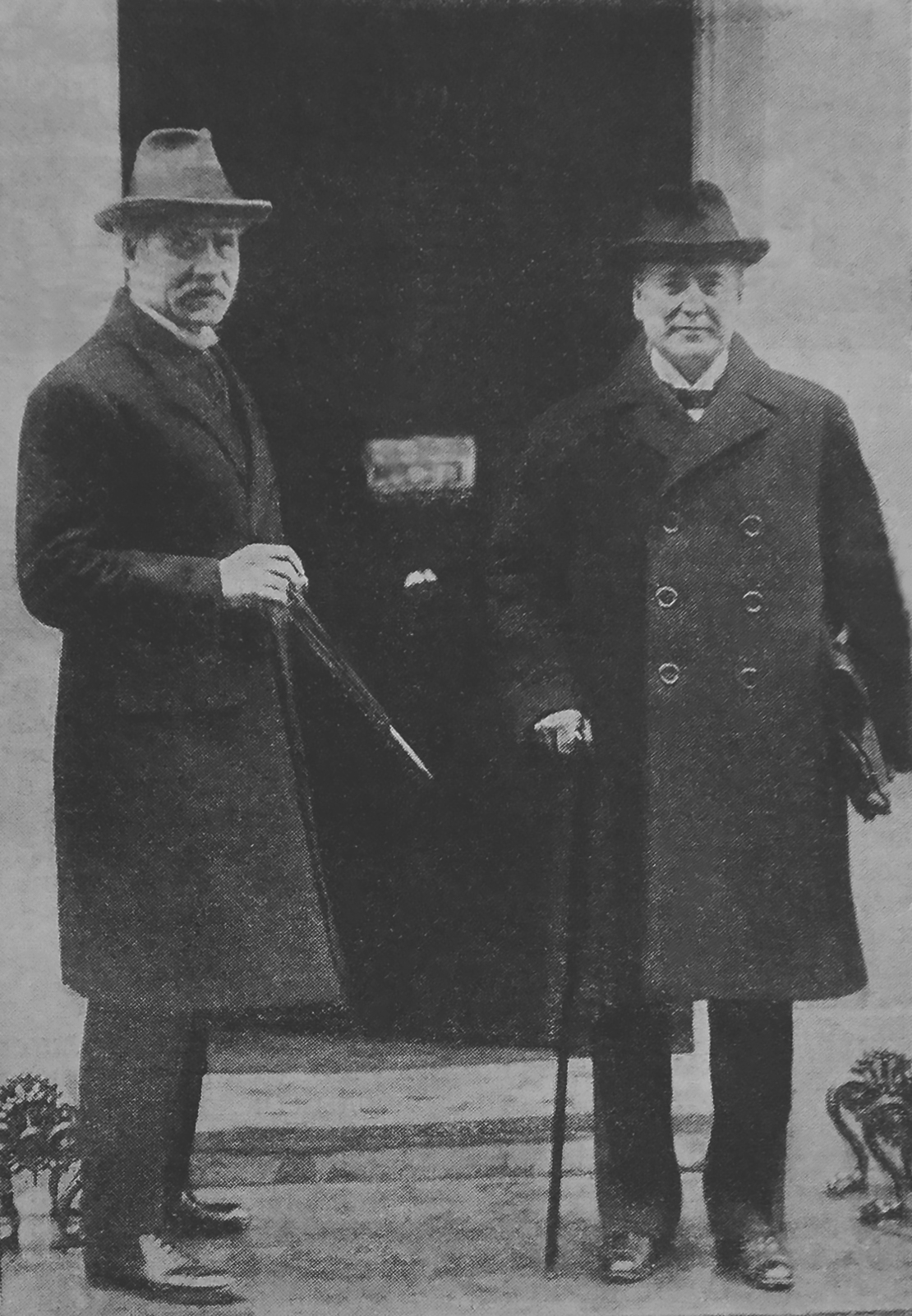
Ramsay MacDonald, Prime Minister UK and Christian Rakovsky, Head of the Soviet diplomatic delegation.

In February 1922, he was sent to Berlin in order to negotiate with German officials, and, in March, was part of the official delegation to the Genoa Conference — under the leadership of Georgy Chicherin. Rakovsky himself was virulently opposed to any stalemate with the Allies, and urged his delegation not to abandon policies over promises of deescalation and trade. A leader of the delegation's commissions on economic aid, loans and government debt, he was also charged with renewing contacts with Germany — together with Adolph Joffe, he discussed the matter with the pro-Soviet Ago von Maltzan, and, as Russia failed to reach an agreement with the Allies, managed to obtain from Germany promises of cooperation (see Treaty of Rapallo, 1922). Two years later, when captured by the Bolsheviks, Eser conspirator Boris Savinkov allegedly confessed that he intended to have both Rakovsky and Chicherin killed in Berlin, as they returned from Genoa. In November 1922, Rakovsky attended the Conference of Lausanne, where he was confronted with the assassination of his fellow diplomat Vaslav Vorovsky by the émigré Maurice Conradi.

As the Soviet Union was being created, Rakovsky became opposed to the new central leadership over the issue of self-determination for the Soviet republics and autonomous republics. This followed the dispute between, on one side, Joseph Stalin, Zinoviev, Trotsky and Kamenev, and, on the other, the leadership of the Georgian SSR (see Georgian Affair). At the time, he evidenced a "permanent struggle which the so-called independent and autonomous republics had to carry out to safeguard not only their prerogatives but their very own existence". Arguing in favor of extending the revolution from Ukraine to the Balkans, and indicating his belief that the peasantry was being alienated by internationalist messages, Rakovsky cited concerns that centralism was placing Soviet influence in peril, and called for "carrying out a correct theoretical and practical solution to the national question within the boundaries of the Soviet Union". In November 1922, his proposition of the formation of a Soviet of Nationalities to double the Soviet of the Union inside the supreme legislative body was opposed by Stalin at first, but later accepted under the pressure of Lenin; his arguments in favor of reducing the number of representatives of Russian SFSR and barring the total number of envoys from any republic at one fifth of the total were dismissed after being criticized by Stalin.

=== Trotskyist opposition and ambassadorship ===
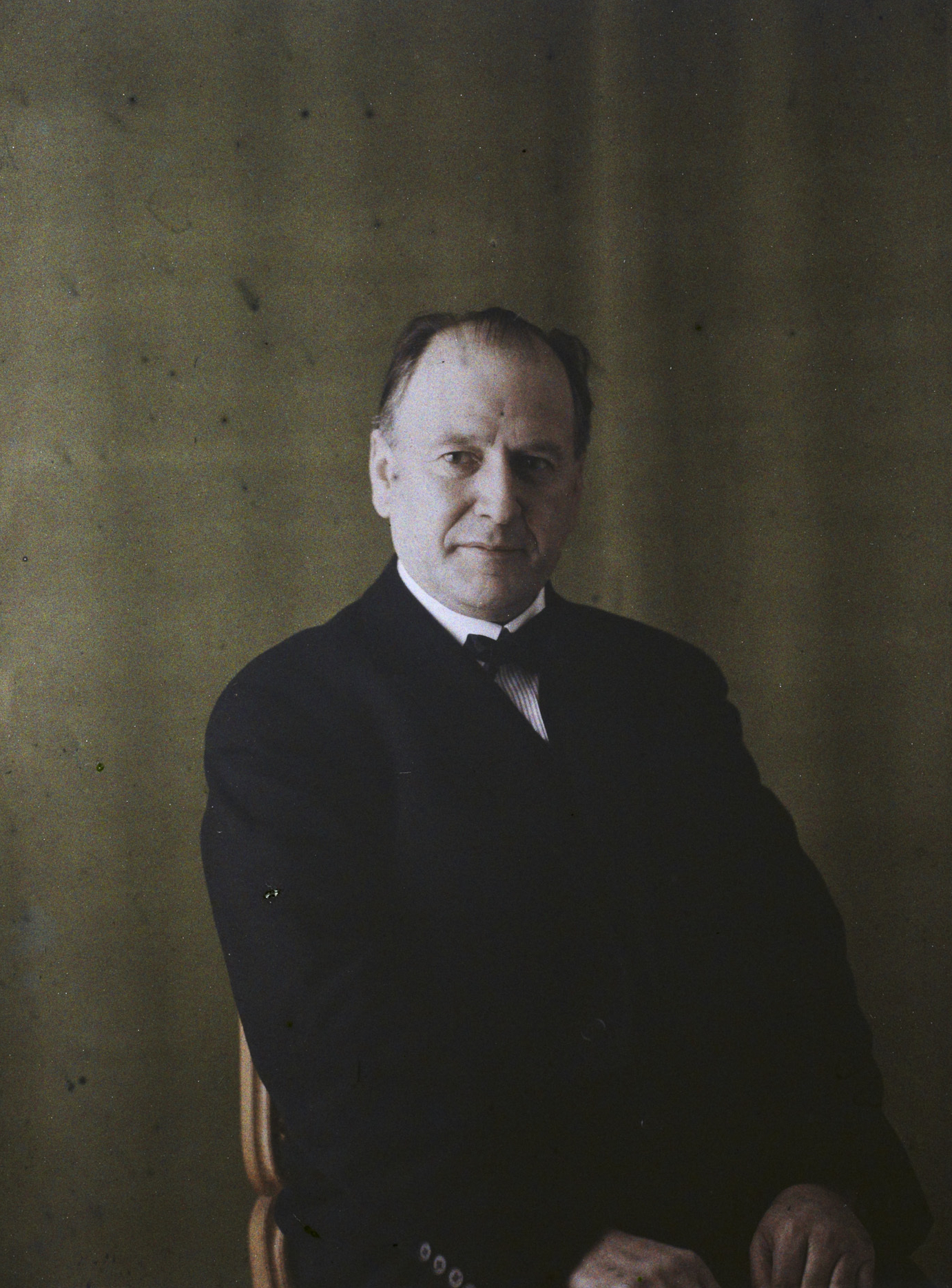
Autochrome portrait by Georges Chevalier, 18 May 1926

After Lenin's illness and incapacitation, Rakovsky joined Leon Trotsky's Left Opposition and came into conflict with Stalin. In one of his last articles as head of the Ukrainian government he dismissed centralism as "the elimination of initiative, of economic, political and administrative independence" and "dead bureaucratic centralization which is synonymous with tyranny" Although declining, his influence in Ukraine was, according to political scientist John P. Willerton, one of Trotsky's main bases of support, alongside sections of the Red Army, a group of Komsomol leaders, and various officials involved in economic planning. In early July 1923, after being isolated inside the Ukrainian leadership, he was removed from his Ukrainian post, replaced with Vlas Chubar, and sent to London to negotiate a formal recognition of the Soviet regime by the British and French governments. Chubar, an ethnic Ukrainian, came to represent Stalin's view on nationality issues in the region, officially defined as "nativization". In London, Rakovsky and his wife were joined by Elena Codreanu, whom they had adopted.

In 1924, as the Labour Party minority cabinet came to power, Ramsay MacDonald and Rakovsky negotiated de jure recognition and agreed on a possible future Anglo-Soviet treaty and a British loan for the Soviet Union. Negotiations were tested by the so-called Bankers' Memorandum, published by The Times, which demanded that the Soviet Union abandon nationalizations and return to private property. Eventually, two treaties were signed, allowing for commerce to be normalized between the two countries, and reflecting Rakovsky's views that private complaints of creditors against the Soviet state were to be settled outside the conference. The scandal which erupted when the Zinoviev Letter was publicized, rekindling suspicions against the Soviet government and provoking the fall of MacDonald's cabinet, brought an end to all further talks. During and after the incident, Rakovsky repeatedly cited evidence that the Letter was a forgery.

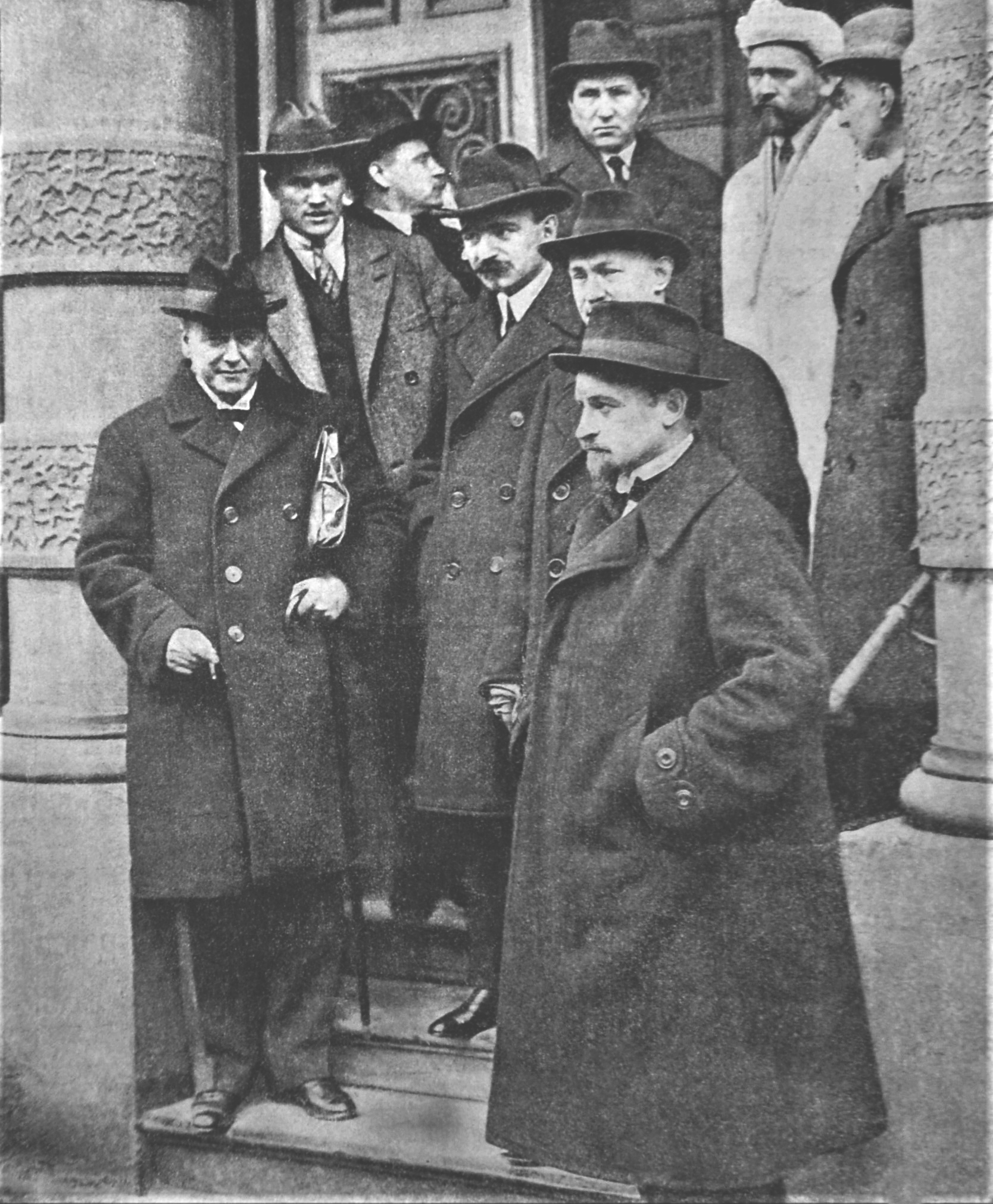
On the front: Christian Rakovsky on the left, and Yevgeni Preobrazhensky in the middle and Grigori Sokolnikov on the right during Soviet UK negotiations in London. Mar 1924

In parallel, he had begun negotiations with France's Raymond Poincaré, who aimed for a "solidarity of foreign creditors" in respect to the Soviet state, and who agreed to recognize the latter on October 28, 1924. One of his last tasks involved placing Soviet orders for machinery, textiles, and other commodities with British manufacturers: worth 75 million US$ on paper, these failed to attract attention after he announced that the Soviet government did not intend to pay in cash. According to the American magazine Time, Rakovsky also played a hand in motivating Stalin's decision to marginalize Comintern leader Zinoviev, by complaining that the latter's foreign policy was needlessly radical.

Rakovsky served as the Soviet ambassador to France between October 1925 and October 1927, replacing Leonid Krasin. He did not take hold of his office until 50 days after his official appointment, refusing to be received at the Élysée Palace by French President Gaston Doumergue for as long as the state authorities would not allow The Internationale (a revolutionary song which was at the time the Soviet national anthem) to be played on the occasion. Doumergeue resisted, and, in the end, Rakovsky was received to the sound of an improvised arrangement of bugles, the more discreet part of which may have been based on The Internationale. Time described it as a "deafening blast".

His first task involved renewed negotiations with the cabinet of Aristide Briand (February 1926), during which he was confronted with the vocal campaign of creditors. Early results achieved in discussions with Anatole de Monzie were dismissed by the opposition rallied around Poincaré, and, after being revived by the short-lived cabinet of Édouard Herriot, talks ended without any result. Poincaré returned to power, and France remained committed to the Locarno Treaties (which had isolated the Soviet state on the international stage). Over the following year, Rakovsky continued to attempt a détente with France, advertising Soviet concessions and speaking directly to the public.

During the same period, as tensions grew between Mexico and the Soviet government over the latter's support for a Mexican railway workers' strike, American agents reported that Rakovsky was instructed to threaten to publicize correspondence between former President Álvaro Obregón and Soviet authorities (which had occurred before diplomatic links were established). Since this could endanger Mexico's relations with the United States, President Plutarco Elías Calles chose to deescalate the conflict.

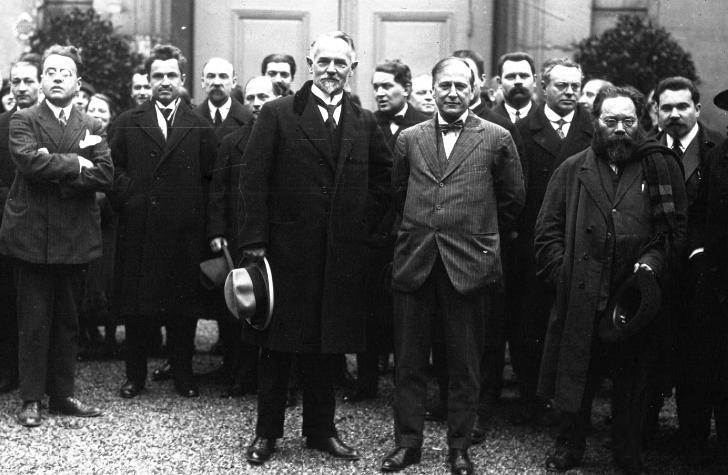
Rakovsky with Leonid Krasin and Charles Rappoport, Paris, 1924

Together with his second wife, Rakovsky gave full approval to Max Eastman's volume Since Lenin Died, which centered on heavy criticism of Soviet realities, and which they reviewed before it was published. He became acquainted with the former French Communist Party member and anti-Stalinist journalist Boris Souvarine, as well as with the Romanian writer Panait Istrati, who had observed Rakovsky's career ever since his presence in Romania. He also maintained friendly contacts with Marcel Pauker, a prominent but independent-minded member of the Romanian Communist Party, whose activities were denounced by the Comintern in 1930.

Rakovsky was eventually declared a persona non grata in France and recalled after signing the Declaration of the Opposition, a Trotskyist platform deemed unfriendly by the French government (it stressed support for revolutions and mutinies in all capitalist countries). According to Time, France's decision was tacitly welcomed by Foreign Affairs Commissar Georgy Chicherin, due to Rakovsky's political opinions. Rakovsky left without presenting his letter of recall to President Doumergue, although he was scheduled for a meeting at the Élysée. He was initially scheduled to serve as Ambassador to Japan. On his trip back to the Soviet state, he was joined by Istrati, who, partly owing to his witnessing of the Rakovsky's downfall, soon became a noted opponent of Stalinism.

=== Persecution and internal exile ===
In December 1927, Rakovsky and Lev Kamenev held brief speeches in front of the Soviet Communist Party's Fifteenth Congress. The former was interrupted fifty-seven times by his opponents—Nikolai Bukharin, Martemyan Ryutin, and Lazar Kaganovich. Although, unlike Rakovsky, Kamenev used the occasion to appeal for reconciliation, he was himself interrupted twenty-four times by the same group.

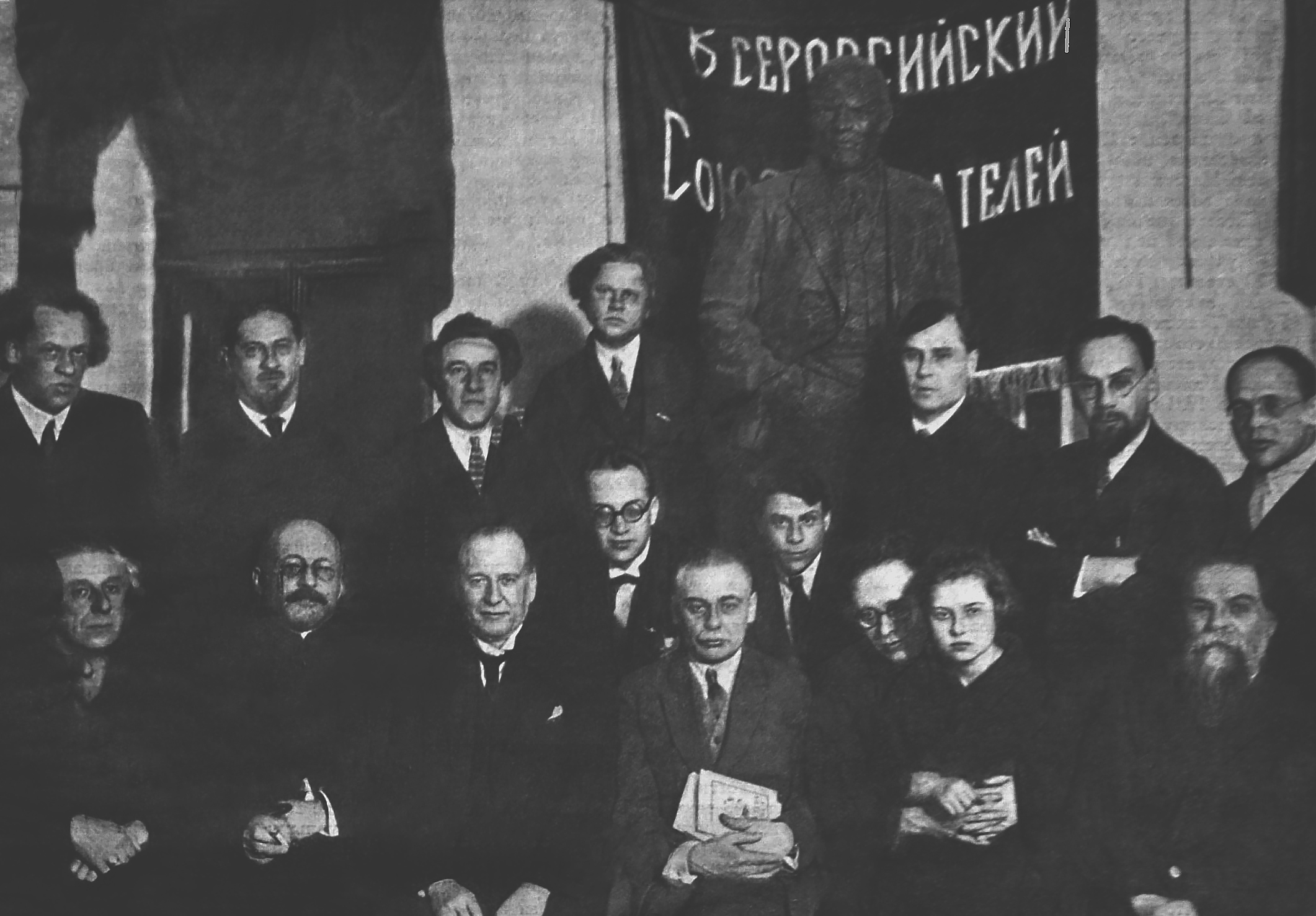
Five year anniversary of Krasnay Nov June 1926; sitting left to right: Georgy Chulkov, Vikenty Veresaev, Christian Rakovsky, Boris Pilnyak, Aleksandr Voronsky, Petr Oreshin, Karl Radek and Pavel Sakulin; standing left to right: Ivan Evdokimov, Vasily Lvov-Rogachevsky, Vyacheslav Polonsky, Fedor Gladkov, Mikhail Gerasimov, Abram Ėfros and Isaac Babel;

After that moment, although branded "enemy of the people", Rakovsky was still occasionally allowed to speak in public (notably, together with Kamenev and Karl Radek, to the Moscow Komsomol), and continued to criticize Stalin's leadership as "bureaucratic socialism" (see Bureaucratic collectivism) and "social fascism". With Nikolai Krestinsky (who split with the group soon afterwards) and Kamenev, he attempted to organize a substantial opposition, visiting Ukraine for this purpose, hosting public meetings and printing manifestos addressed to the workers in Kyiv, Kharkiv, Mykolaiv, Odessa, Dnipropetrovsk, Kherson, and Zaporizhzhia (he was assisted by, among others, Yuri Kotsubinsky). He was persistently heckled during public appearances, and his supporters were beaten up by the Militsiya.

In November 1927, after receiving news that Adolph Joffe had committed suicide, he assigned Ukrainian campaigning to Voja Vujović, and returned to Moscow. Following the defeat of the Left Opposition in November–December 1927, Rakovsky was ousted from the Comintern, the Central Committee, and eventually from the Communist Party of the Soviet Union. He was exiled, first to Astrakhan, Saratov, and then to Barnaul. Shortly before the decision, he commented to his visitor, French writer Pierre Naville: "The French expelled me from Paris for having signed a declaration of the opposition. Stalin expelled me from the [Foreign Affairs Commissariat] for having signed the same declaration. But in both cases they let me keep the jacket".

While in Astrakhan, Rakovsky was employed by the Regional Planning Committee (Gubplan). He was also active as a writer, starting work on a volume detailing the sources of Utopian socialism and the thought of Saint-Simon. Rakovsky remained involved in Trotskyist politics, was contacted by Panait Istrati and the Greek writer Nikos Kazantzakis, and corresponded with Trotsky (who had himself been exiled to Almaty). Most of his writings were confiscated by the State Political Directorate, but the letter on Soviet "bureaucratism" he addressed to Nikolai Valentinov survived, and became notorious as a critique of Stalinism (under the title "Professional Dangers" of Power). Mistrusting Stalin's new leftist policies, he foresaw the renewed moves against the Left Opposition (inaugurated by Trotsky's 1929 expulsion).

As his health deteriorated, he was allowed to move to Saratov upon requests addressed by Krestinsky to Kaganovich, the Secretary of the Central Committee. He was visited by Louis Fischer, who recorded Rakovsky's determination not to submit to Stalin (contrasting his option with those of Radek, Yevgeni Preobrazhensky, Alexander Beloborodov and Ivar Smilga).

Instead, Rakovsky incited further resistance to Stalinism, and issued a declaration of the united opposition; following this, he was sent to Barnaul, which he called a "hole in the barren cold ground". In another critical letter to the Party leadership (April 1930), he called for, among other things, the restoration of civil liberties, a reduction in the party apparatus, the return of Trotsky, and an end to forced collectivization.

Little is known of Rakovsky's life between that moment and July 1932, the moment when he was allowed a medical leave. Towards the end of the same year, Trotsky was informed that he had attempted to flee the Soviet Union, and, in March 1933, it was announced that he had been deported to Yakutia. Answering Trotsky's request, the French mathematician and Trotskyist Jean Van Heijenoort, together with his fellow activist Pierre Frank, unsuccessfully called on the influential Soviet author Maxim Gorky to intervene in favor of Christian Rakovsky, and boarded the ship he was traveling on near Istanbul. According to Heijenoort, they only managed to meet Gorky's son, Maxim Peshkov, who reportedly told them that his father was indisposed, but promised to pass on their request. Researcher Tova Yedlin proposed that the problem was caused by Gorky's distress over having recently separated from his mistress Moura Budberg, as well as to the writer's close surveillance by OGPU agents.

=== Submission to Stalin and the Show Trial ===
Rakovsky was one of the last leading Trotskyists to break with Trotsky and surrender to Stalin. Alarmed by Adolf Hitler's rise to power in Germany and under intense pressure from Stalin, he announced his submission to the Party through a telegram he sent Izvestia (23 February 1934). While Rakovsky was allowed to return to Moscow, Trotsky declared the dissociation statement to be "purely formal".

Rakovsky formally "admitted his mistakes" in April 1934 (his letter to the Pravda, titled There Should Be No Mercy, depicted Trotsky and his supporters as "agents of the German Gestapo"). He was appointed to high office in the Commissariat for Health and allowed to return to Moscow, also serving as Soviet ambassador to Japan in 1935.

Cited in allegations involving the killing of Sergey Kirov, Rakovsky was arrested in autumn 1937, during the Great Purge; according to Trotsky, he was forced to wait without food or rest for 18 hours, during which time his house was being searched.

Shortly thereafter, in March 1938, he was put on trial along with Nikolai Bukharin, Alexei Rykov, Genrikh Yagoda, Nikolai Krestinsky and other Old Bolsheviks, on charges of conspiring with Trotsky to overthrow Stalin, the third Moscow Show Trial—known as the Trial of the Twenty-One. In his forced confession to Andrey Vyshinsky, he admitted to all the charges—including having been a spy (for Japan) and a landowner. He made attempts to point out that his revenue had been used to support socialism, and that he had a grasp of "revolutionary practices", but was attacked by Vyshinsky, who persistently referred to Rakovsky as "a counterrevolutionary". In his final statement, Rakovsky argued: "from my young days I honestly, truthfully and devotedly performed my duty as a soldier of the cause of the emancipation of labor. After this bright period a dark period set in, the period of my criminal deeds".

Unlike most of his co-defendants, who were immediately executed, he was sentenced to twenty years of hard labor. In 1941, he was in Oryol Prison. After the Nazi invasion of the Soviet Union (Operation Barbarossa), Rakovsky was shot on Stalin's orders outside Oryol — along with Olga Kameneva, Maria Spiridonova, and over 150 other political prisoners in the Medvedev Forest massacre. This execution was one of the many massacres of prisoners committed by the NKVD in 1941.

== Legacy and rehabilitation ==
Rakovsky's second wife, Alexandrina Alexandrescu, was herself arrested, and is known to have been held in Butyrka prison, where she suffered a series of heart attacks. His adoptive daughter, Elena Codreanu-Racovski, was expelled from her job as secretary of the Mossoviet Theater, and deported to Siberia. She returned to Moscow in the 1950s, after Stalin's death, and settled in Communist Romania after 1975, rejoining her brother, the biologist and academic Radu Codreanu. She later authored a memoir which included recollections of her father (it was published in Romanian as De-a lungul şi de-a latul secolului, "The Length and Breadth of the Century"). It was compiled from personal notes and dialogs with physician and former communist militant G. Brătescu, who noted that, probably owing to suspicions she had in respect to the Romanian communist regime, Elena Codreanu refused to talk about Rakovsky's trial and her own persecution. Rakovsky's nephew Boris Stefanov, whom he encouraged to join the Romanian socialist movement before World War I, later became a general secretary of the Romanian Communist Party, before being himself purged in 1940.

By 1932, Rakovsky's name was frequently invoked in the heated debate involving Panait Istrati and his political adversaries. Istrati, having returned to Romania in disillusion over Soviet realities, was initially attacked in the local right-wing newspapers Curentul and Universul; writing for the former, Pamfil Şeicaru defined Istrati as "the servant of Racovski". Having published To the Other Flame, in which he exposed Stalinism, he consequently became the target of intense criticism and allegations from various pro-Soviet writers, led by the Frenchman Henri Barbusse. During this period, the Romanian communist writer Alexandru Sahia speculated, among other things, that Istrati had been in the pay of Rakovsky and Trotsky for a sizable part of his life.

Based on his independent opinions and, in part, on his friendship with Rakovsky, Marcel Pauker was disavowed by the Romanian and Soviet communist parties, and was himself a victim of the Great Purge in 1938. At various intervals between 1930 and 1952, his wife, the Romanian communist leader Ana Pauker, faced pressures to denounce her husband. She allegedly refused to criticize him for anything other than his association with Rakovsky, and to admit that Marcel Pauker had been guilty of all the charges brought against him.

The Hungarian-born author Arthur Koestler, himself a former communist, based Rubashov, the main character in his 1940 novel, Darkness at Noon, on victims of the Moscow Trials; according to George Orwell, Rakovsky's fate was a possible direct influence: "Rubashov might be called Trotsky, Bukharin, Rakovsky or some other relatively civilised figure among the Old Bolsheviks. If one writes about the Moscow trials one must answer the question, «Why did the accused confess?» and which answer one makes is a political decision. Koestler answers, in effect, «Because these people had been rotted by the Revolution which they served», and in doing so he comes near to claiming that revolutions are of their nature bad".

In 1988, during Glasnost, the Soviet government cleared Rakovsky and his co-defendants of all charges. His rehabilitation came in February, coinciding with that of Bukharin, as well as with those of Ukrainian official and former People's Commissar for Agriculture Mikhail Alexandrovich Chernov, former People's Commissar for Foreign Trade Arkady Rosengolts, and other five officials. Bukharin, Rakovsky, Rozengolts, and Chernov were posthumously reinstated to the Communist Party on 21 June 1988. His works were given imprimatur, while a favorable biography was published by the Ukrainian Academy of Sciences (late 1988).

== See also ==
- Outline of the Russian Revolution and Civil War
- Bibliography of the Russian Revolution and Civil War
- Bibliography of Stalinism and the Soviet Union
- Index of Old Bolsheviks
- Index of articles related to the Russian Revolution and Civil War

== Bibliography ==
- Christian Rakovsky Internet Archive at Marxists.org:
  - Gus Fagan, Biographical Introduction to Christian Rakovsky, Selected Writings on Opposition in the USSR 1923–30 (editor: Gus Fagan), Allison & Busby, London & New York, 1980; retrieved July 19, 2007
  - Christian Rakovsky, "An Autobiography", Granat, 1926, translated by Gus Fagan; retrieved July 19, 2007
- (in Romanian) 110 ani de social-democraţie în România ("110 Years of Social Democracy in Romania"), Social Democratic Party, Ovidiu Şincai Social Democratic Institute, Bucharest, July 9, 2003; retrieved July 19, 2007
- G. Brătescu, Ce-a fost să fie. Notaţii autobiografice ("That Which Was Meant to Be. Autobiographical Notes"), Humanitas, Bucharest, 2003. ISBN 978-973-50-0425-5
- Şerban Cioculescu, Caragialiana, Editura Eminescu, Bucharest, 1974. OCLC 6890267
- Yuri Feofanov, Donald Barry, Arbitrary Justice: Courts and Politics in Post-Stalin Russia, National Council for Soviet and East European Research and Lehigh University, Washington, D. C., 1995; retrieved July 19, 2007
- Victor Frunză, Istoria stalinismului în România ("The History of Stalinism in Romania"), Humanitas, Bucharest, 1990. ISBN 978-973-28-0177-2
- Șt. O. Iosif, D. Anghel, "Racovski", in Cireşul lui Lucullus. Teatru, proză, traduceri ("Lucullus' Cherry Tree. Drama, Prose, Translations"), Editura Minerva, Bucharest, 1976. OCLC 2598894
- Irina Livezeanu, Cultural Politics in Greater Romania: Regionalism, Nation Building and Ethnic Struggle, 1918–1930, Cornell University Press, New York City, 1995. ISBN 978-0-8014-8688-3
- Roy Medvedev, Let History Judge, Spokesman Books, Nottingham, 1976. ISBN 978-0-85124-150-0
- Z. Ornea, Viaţa lui C. Stere ("The Life of C. Stere"), Vol. I, Cartea Românească, Bucharest, 1989. ISBN 978-973-23-0099-2
- (in French) Christian Rakovsky, Les socialistes et la guerre ("The Socialists and the War"), 1915, at Marxists.org (French edition); retrieved July 19, 2007
- Judith Shapiro, "The Prophet Returned? A Survey of Recent Works by and about Trotsky in the Soviet Union", in Revolutionary History, Vol. 2, No. 2, Summer 1989; retrieved July 19, 2007
- Stelian Tănase,
  - (in Romanian) "Cristian Racovski" (Part I), in Magazin Istoric, April 2004; retrieved July 19, 2007
  - "The Renegade Istrati", excerpt from Auntie Varvara's Clients, translated by Alistair Ian Blyth, in Archipelago, Vol.10–12; retrieved July 19, 2007
- Vladimir Tismăneanu, Stalinism for All Seasons: A Political History of Romanian Communism, University of California Press, Berkeley, 2003, ISBN 978-0-520-23747-6
- Glenn E. Torrey, "Rumania's Decision to Intervene: Brătianu and the Entente, June–July 1916", in Keith Hitchins (ed.), Romanian Studies. Vol. 2, 1971–1972, Brill Publishers, Leiden, 1973, p. 3–29. ISBN 978-90-04-03639-0
- (in French) Leon Trotsky, Christian Rakovsky et Basile Kolarov ("Christian Rakovsky and Vasil Kolarov"), 1915, at Marxists.org (French edition); retrieved July 19, 2007
- Charles Upson Clark, Bessarabia. Russia and Roumania on the Black Sea: Chapter XXI, "Rakovsky's Roumanian Career", at the University of Washington; retrieved July 19, 2007
