= Anthem of May Day =

English: Anthem of May Day
- Also known as: (English: "Song of Labour")
- Lyrics: Georgi Kirkov
- Music: Georgi Goranov

The "Anthem of May Day", also known as the "Song of Labour", is a patriotic song used on May Day in Bulgaria and Yugoslavia. It was written and composed by Methodius Grigorov.

== History ==
The lyrics of the song were written by Bulgarian Workers' Social Democratic Party activist Georgi Kirkov, and were published in 1898 in the "Red People's Calendar" almanac. It was partly inspired by the lyrics of the Austrian social democratic anthem "Lied der Arbeit" from 1868.

Initially, Kirkov's poem was recited at gatherings of social democrats. In 1900, composer Georgi Goranov composed a melody for the lyrics. The song was performed for the first time on 24 May 1903 in Kyustendil. In the following years, it gained popularity among socialist circles and was often performed.

In 1912, the poem was translated into Serbo-Croatian as it gained popularity in Yugoslavia, and the song eventually became widely known in the Yugoslav socialist movement. It was also translated into Albanian, and this version, known as "Kënga e şişti" was used by communists in Kosovo.

== Lyrics ==
Bulgarian original	Romanization of Bulgarian	Serbo-Croatian version	English translation
Дружна песен нек да екне, песен, песен на труда! На сърца ни да олекне, да живей, живей труда! Рядка участ, с чудно име слави, слави се труда, нему всичко ний дължиме, да живей, живей труда! Повдигнете си челата, о, герои на труда, вий творци сте на благата, да живей, живей труда! От стрелата на дивака до железний път всичко плод е на ръката, да живей, живей трудът!	Družna pesen nek da ekne, pesen, pesen na truda! Na sǎrca ni da olekne, da živej, živej truda! Rjadka učast, s čudno ime slavi, slavi se truda, nemu vsičko nij dǎlžime, da živej, živej truda! Povdignete si čelata, o, geroi na truda, vij tvorci ste na blagata, da živej, živej truda! Ot strelata na divaka do železnij pǎt vsičko plod e na rǎkata, da živej, živej trudǎt!	Drugarska se pjesma ori pjesma koja slavi rad! Srce gromko nek na zbori: Da nam živi živi rad! Podignimo u vis čela mi, robovi rada svog! naša bit će zemlja cijela: Da nam živi živi rad! U divljaka luk i strijela. Željeznice, selo i grad, to su naših ruku djela: Da nam živi živi rad! Od Jadrana do Kitaja slobode nam sunce sja, takva bit će zemlja cijela: Da nam živi živi rad!	Let a harmonious song ring out, a song, a song of labour! To lighten our hearts, long live, long live labour! A remarkable fate with a marvellous name glory, glory to labour, we owe him everything long live, long live labour! Raise your foreheads, oh, heroes of labour you're the creators of goods, long live, long live labour! From the arrow of the savage next to the railway every fruit is in the hand long live, long live labour!
