= Bulgarian Social Democratic Union =

Leftist group (1892–1894)

Bulgarian Social Democratic Union Български социалдемократически съюз
- Leader: Yanko Sakazov
- Founder: Yanko Sakazov; Konstantin Bozveliev; Sava Mutafov
- Founded: 1892
- Dissolved: July 1894
- Split from: BSP
- Succeeded by: BRSDP
- Ideology: Social democracy
- Political position: Left-wing
- Colours: Red

The Bulgarian Social Democratic Union (Bulgarian: Български социалдемократически съюз) was a Bulgarian leftist group founded in 1892.

== History ==
In 1892 a group, led by Yanko Sakazov, founded a reformist organization, the Bulgarian Social Democratic Union (hence their name, Unionists). This group was opposed by another one, marxist Bulgarian Socialdemocratic Party (later called Partists), which was headed by Dimitar Blagoev. In 1894, Blagoev’s supporters agreed to unite with the Unionists in the interests of working class unity and took the name Bulgarian Social Democratic Workers' Party. The First Congress (July 1894), at which the Unionists were in the majority, adopted a program and statutes that were primarily reformist. They gained the majority in the leadership.
