= Dimitar Blagoev =

Bulgarian political leader and philosopher (1856–1924)

- Димитър Благоев
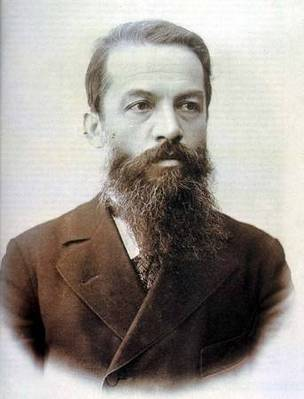
- Born: 14 June 1856; Zagorichani, Ottoman Empire (present-day Vasileiada, Greece)
- Died: 7 May 1924 (aged 67); Sofia, Kingdom of Bulgaria
- Education: SPbU
- Occupation: Politician
- Political party: Bulgarian Workers' Social Democratic Party; Narrows; Bulgarian Communist Party
- Spouse: Vela Blagoeva (m. 1883; died 1921)

Dimitar Blagoev Nikolov (Bulgarian: Димитър Благоев Николов; Macedonian: Димитар Благоев Николов; 14 June 1856 – 7 May 1924) was a Bulgarian political leader and philosopher. Blagoev was the founder of socialism in Bulgaria and the first social-democratic party in the Balkans, the Marxist Bulgarian Social Democratic Party. He led the Narrow Socialists after a split in 1903. Blagoev was also an important figure in the early history of Russian Marxism, and later founded and led the Bulgarian Communist Party. He was a proponent for the establishment of a Balkan Federation.

== Biography ==
=== Early years and education ===
Blagoev was born on 14 June 1856 in village Zagorichani in the region of Macedonia (today Vasiliada in Agioi Anargyroi, Kastoria, Greece), at that time part of the Ottoman Empire, into a poor peasant family. Per historian John D. Bell and Blagoev himself, Zagorichani was a large Bulgarian village. The village was affected by the Bulgarian national awakening. In his memoirs from 1922, Blagoev wrote:

As can be seen from the small notes from my life, as a youth I was educated in the nationalist spirit, yet this was not only nationalist but also revolutionary. By receiving the national idea from the Bulgarian agitators of the times, I also took on their revolutionary spirit … And when I went to Russia, I had already well imbued the revolutionary in me. The political and social relationships then, provided this May with the necessary conditions for it to mature and helped me to develop a clear revolutionary consciousness. Moreover, the political conditions and struggles in Bulgaria after the Liberation showed me very clearly the bankruptcy of that path to the realization of the national idea.

His father was a poor peasant, who went to Constantinople to gain additional income for his family by working as a dairyman. In 1870, Blagoev left Zagorichani, joining his father in Constantinople. He worked as an apprentice cobbler for two years and then enrolled into the Bulgarian school ran by Bulgarian national activist Petko Slaveykov. Slaveykov regarded Blagoev as a suitable pupil from the region of Macedonia to promote the Bulgarian national cause. In 1875, Slaveykov arranged for Blagoev to enroll into the high school in Gabrovo, but his studies were interrupted by the April Uprising of 1876 in which Blagoev participated. When the Ottoman Turks suppressed the rebellion, Blagoev fled to Stara Zagora. Blagoev attended secondary school in Odessa, with the help of the Bulgarian community there because he did not have any funds. Blagoev also met socialist Yanko Sakazov there, but neither of them liked the school. During the Russo-Turkish War, he participated as a Bulgarian volunteer.

In 1880, Blagoev enrolled into Saint Petersburg University, studying on a scholarship by the Benevolent Society. He initially studied at the faculty of physical science and mathematics and then of law, where Blagoev was quickly attracted by radical student circles and narodnik ideology. He came under the ideological influence of the works and ideas by Ferdinand Lassalle, Nikolay Chernyshevsky and Mikhail Bakunin. In 1882/1883, works by Ferdinand Lasalle and the first volume of Karl Marx's Capital (Russian translation) convinced him to become a socialist. In 1883, Blagoev met and married the teacher, writer, and women's activist Vela Blagoeva (née Victoria Atanasova Zhivkova), with whom he would have four children: Stela, Natalia, Vladimir and Dimitur. Blagoev managed to win over a group of around ten people who worked to promote Marxism among the students and to make contact with workers. In 1884, he formed the first Marxist group to operate within Russia, which was known as the Party of Russian Social Democrats. In 1885, the group published a newspaper, "Rabochii" (Worker), Russia's first Marxist publication. In 1885, it aligned with Georgi Plekhanov's Emancipation of Labour Group, based in Switzerland.

=== Return to Bulgaria ===
After the Russian imperial authorities became familiar with his activity, Blagoev was arrested and extradited in 1885. He returned to Bulgaria, where he began to propagate socialist ideas. Blagoev found work in the government. From June to August 1885, he anonymously published the country's first Marxist journal, Contemporary Index (published with the help of pupils from a gymnasium in Sofia), which also accepted ideas related to utopian socialism and populism, apart from Marxist ideas. His activity was interrupted by the Bulgarian unification and the Serbo-Bulgarian War. Unlike most Bulgarians, Blagoev did not support the unification because he regarded it as a benefit for the Bulgarian prince Alexander of Battenberg rather than the people. His lack of patriotism alienated him from his friends, one of whom revealed him as the publisher of Contemporary Index, thus causing Blagoev's discharge from the government. Later, Blagoev changed his view and regarded the unification as beneficial for economic development. In 1886, Blagoev moved to Shumen, where he taught in an elementary school and reunited with Sakazov. Blagoev moved to Viden, where he remained until 1890, trying to attract people to Marxism among the local intelligentsia.

In 1890, Blagoev was fired and nearly incarcerated after publicly criticising prince Ferdinand. He settled in Veliko Tarnovo, where he made efforts to create a national party of the working class and became close with socialist Nikola Gabrovski. After the assassination attempt on Bulgarian prime minister Stefan Stambolov in March 1891, a crackdown on the political opposition ensued, including socialists, through censorship, surveillance, and prison brutality. Blagoev and Gabrovski prepared a statute. Since political assemblies were forbidden then, Blagoev and his associates held the Buzludzha Congress from 2 August 1891, where the Bulgarian Social Democratic Party was established. Blagoev and Gabrovski's statute was adopted, Sakazov's newspaper Den (Day) was adopted as the party's newspaper, and it was also decided to publish a "Bulgarian Social Democratic Library" to make basic ideological works available to the Bulgarian public. In the congress, a general council headquartered in Tarnovo, including Blagoev and Gabrovski, was elected. Sakazov and other associates regarded the formation of the party as premature, suggesting the replacement of explicit political activity with a campaign for improved wages and working conditions for the proletariat. However, Blagoev did not want any change of course. The issue came up in August 1892 at the party's congress in Plovdiv. Sakazov and his allies ended up splitting to create the Social Democratic Union, as they were unable to convince Blagoev. The majority of socialist circles associated with the Social Democratic Union also took with away the socialist press, thus Blagoev and Gabrovski had to create a new newspaper called Rabotnik (Worker), and to work on rebuilding the party's cells.

Blagoev was arrested in November 1893 on false charges of plotting to assassinate prince Ferdinand. After his release, he managed to make an agreement on reunion with Sakazov. The Social Democratic Party and the Social Democratic Union merged to form the Bulgarian Workers' Social Democratic Party, preserving Blagoev's adaptation of the Erfurt Program as its statute. A five-member central committee was elected, including Blagoev and Sakazov. Gabrovski’s Rabotnik was made the official party newspaper, Sakuzov's Den became its monthly journal, and Dabev's Drugar (Comrade) became the party's working-class publication. In 1894, Blagoev did not recognise the independence of the workers' political and economic struggles, advocating that the unions should be subordinated to the party and grant membership only to party members. In 1897, after Sakazov stopped publishing Den to focus more on the National Assembly, Blagoev started publishing a new monthly journal, Novo vreme (New Time), named after Karl Kautsky's Neue Zeit, which he edited from 1897 to 1923. He published many articles there, including Marxism or revisionism? and Opportunism or socialism. Blagoev used the journal as a venue to criticize the "broad," social-collaborationist policy of Sakazov and his associates. In turn, they accused Blagoev of interpreting socialism narrowly, which he admitted. This gave rise to the use of the terms "Broad" and "Narrow" to characterise the two factions and later the political parties. In the 1890s, Gyorche Petrov proposed to him the leadership of the Supreme Macedonian-Adrianople Committee (SMAC), but he declined. Blagoev gained the support from a number of younger party members such as Georgi Bakalov, Georgi Kirkov, Hristo Kabakchiev, Vasil Kolarov, and Georgi Dimitrov. By 1901, Blagoev had a majority of the party's central committee supporting him. At the eighth and ninth party congresses in 1901 and 1902, his supporters issued resolutions condemning Sakazov and his doctrines. In March 1903, 53 of Blagoev's followers defected from the party, accusing its leadership of not paying enough attention to the party's proletarian base, and appealed for official recognition. On 6—12 July 1903, Blagoev led a congress of his followers in Ruse, expelling Sakazov and his associates, who in turn held their own congress. It resulted in the emergence of two Bulgarian socialist parties, the Narrow Socialists and the Broad Socialists. Blagoev become the leader of the "Narrows", pursuing orthodox Marxism. The "Broads" led by Sakazov focused on gaining reforms for the workers, such as shorters workdays and higher wages, and cooperation with the peasants. Blagoev believed that the party should be based on the workers alone and supported a more radical program, including the confiscation of all private property.

From 1902 to 1919, he was elected as a member of the assembly three times, and led the parliamentary group of Narrows. With his intervention, the General Workers' Syndicate Union was created in 1904, which led strikes from 1906 to 1909. During the Russian Revolution of 1905, Blagoev inclined towards the ideas of the Bolsheviks, but he did not accept some of Vladimir Lenin’s principles, such as Lenin's view on the alliance of workers and peasants for the revolution. He believed that the revolution would succeed first in the developed capitalist countries, thus he opposed starting a revolution in Bulgaria. In January 1910, a Narrow Socialist Party delegation consisting of him, Kirkov, Kolarov, Dimitrov, and Kabakchiev attended the first Balkan Social Democratic Congress in Belgrade. They met with representatives of socialist groups from the Balkans. Blagoev led the congress, which adopted a resolution condemning the interference of the Great Powers in the Balkans and the efforts of the leaders of the Balkan states to gain hegemony at the expense of their neighbours.

=== Wartime activities and death ===
During the Balkan Wars and World War I, the Narrows under his leadership resisted against "militarism" and "Greater Bulgarian chauvinism", promoting slogans of peace and cooperation between the Balkan states for the revolution. Blagoev condemned the First Balkan War as the result of imperialism by the Great Powers, as well as the chauvinism and class aspirations of the Balkan bourgeoisies. Between 1911 and 1915, he was also a councillor in Sofia. Blagoev supported the October Revolution and the positions of the Bolsheviks. Both him and Georgi Dimitrov held anti-war speeches and a peace resolution was issued, which Blagoev later read to the National Assembly. Blagoev opposed war credits. He was a co-organizer of the Communist International. In 1919, he became the first leader of the Bulgarian Communist Party (BCP). Blagoeva died on 21 July 1921. In 1923, Blagoev withdrew from active political life due to his poor health. He died on 7 May 1924 in Sofia.

== Views ==
In September 1891, the Bulgarian Social Democratic Library published his book titled What Is Socialism and Is There a Basis for It Here? as its first publication. It was the first public statement about a socialist program by a Bulgarian author. The book was influenced by Plekhanov's Our Differences (1885). It was a primary source of information and inspiration for Bulgarian Marxists. Blagoev argued "that the country must and will pass from the peasant economy into and through a capitalist phase to socialism, and that all hopes of avoiding this development through the resurrection of the largely defunct zadruga and of artisan industry are vain." He believed that "the small peasant was destined to disappear as agriculture inevitably moved towards capitalization and larger units worked by wage-labourers; today's small peasants were therefore tomorrow's rural proletariat". Blagoev was a strong supporter of industrialisation. In a section that he later renounced, Blagoev wrote that there was no basis in Bulgaria for socialist extremism, such as those who saw revolution as "bombs and dynamite." Per him, the task for socialists was to concentrate on organisation and agitation among the intelligentsia and workers, poor artisans, and tradesmen, who were "tomorrow's proletarians." He also argued with the proponents of socialism who pursued limited and mostly economic goals without forming a strong party of the working class. Blagoev later renounced the importance of general suffrage in the socialists' struggle for political power. Russian emigrant Vladimir Debogory-Mokrievich criticised Blagoev for applying borrowed social categories without basis of the local reality.

Blagoev believed that class struggle would allow communism to be successful, even in a purely peasant society. As an adherent of Marxism, Blagoev supported the Marxist concept of the international nature of socialism. He perceived proletarian internationalism as the love of one's own people and all other people, unlike the love of the country advocated by the nationalist bourgeoisie, which he perceived as being based on the exploitation of the people. Blagoev was especially interested in the Macedonian Question. He believed that a Balkan Federation could solve the Macedonian Question. Unlike other Bulgarian socialists, he saw the proposed Balkan federation as a community of nations rather than a federation of states. Blagoev published articles (mainly in the Rabotnicheski vestnik newspaper), denouncing imperialism and criticising the views of Karl Kautsky, who spoke against the principle of the dictatorship of the proletariat. He also authored works on the history of the workers' movement in Bulgaria, esthetics, and the theory of literature, such as Dialectical materialism and the theory of cognition (1903–1904) and Contribution to the history of socialism in Bulgaria (1906).

Blagoev once denied his Bulgarian origins and declared himself simply as a Slav. He occasionally self-identified as a "Macedonian Slav", such as in a speech before the Bulgarian National Assembly in 1917. Among the Balkan social democrats, Blagoev was the most critical of the Second International. Blagoev called for an class struggle without compromises, condemning "opportunism, social-imperialism, and social-patriotism." In February 1920, Blagoev allegedly confessed to a British military attaché in Sofia and a journalist from The Times that he was "first of all a Bulgarian patriot" and that only through Bolshevik principles could "the thousands of Bulgarians in Macedonia, Dobrudja and Thrace" gain their self-determination. According to British observers, his party, despite being socialist by name, was essentially imperialistic and aspired to a "Greater Bulgaria". Blagoev wrote for a paper of the Narrows that the party could agree with the bourgeoisie in supporting the idea of uniting all Bulgarians into a single state, creating a larger market and encouraging the development of the economy and the socialist movement.

== Honours ==
- In 1949-1950, the city of Gorna Dzhumaya in the Blagoevgrad Province in Bulgaria was renamed after him as Blagoevgrad.
- The village of Blahoyeve in Odessa Oblast was renamed in 1923 after him (formerly Velikiy Buyalyk).
- The settlement of Blagoyevo in the Komi Republic of Russia also bears Dimitar Blagoev's name.
- The Buzludzha Monument on the peak of Buzludzha was built by the Bulgarian communist regime to commemorate the 1891 founding of the Bulgarian Social Democratic Party. It was opened in 1981.
- A house-museum named after him is in Bankya.

== Gallery ==
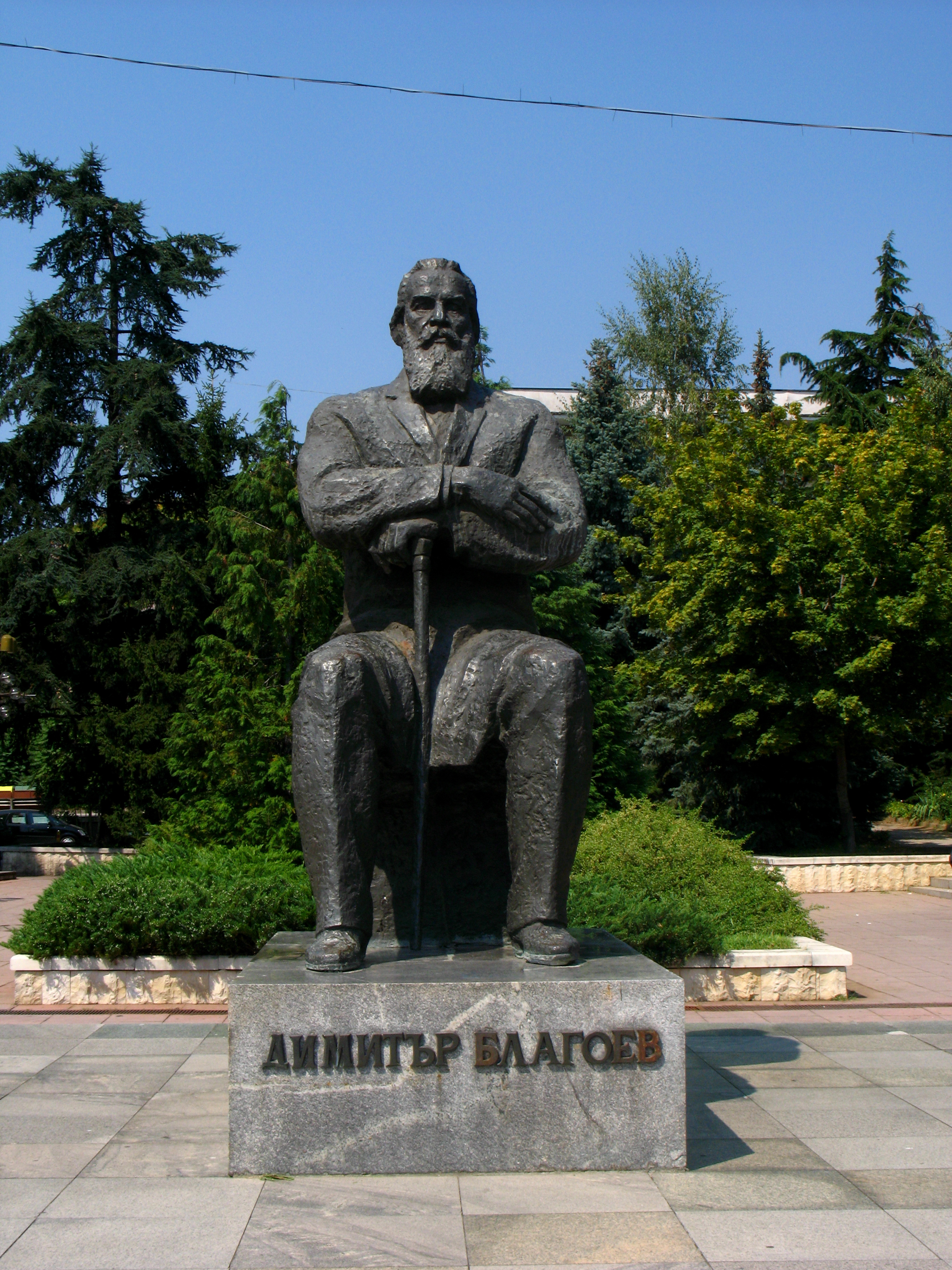
Monument in Blagoevgrad

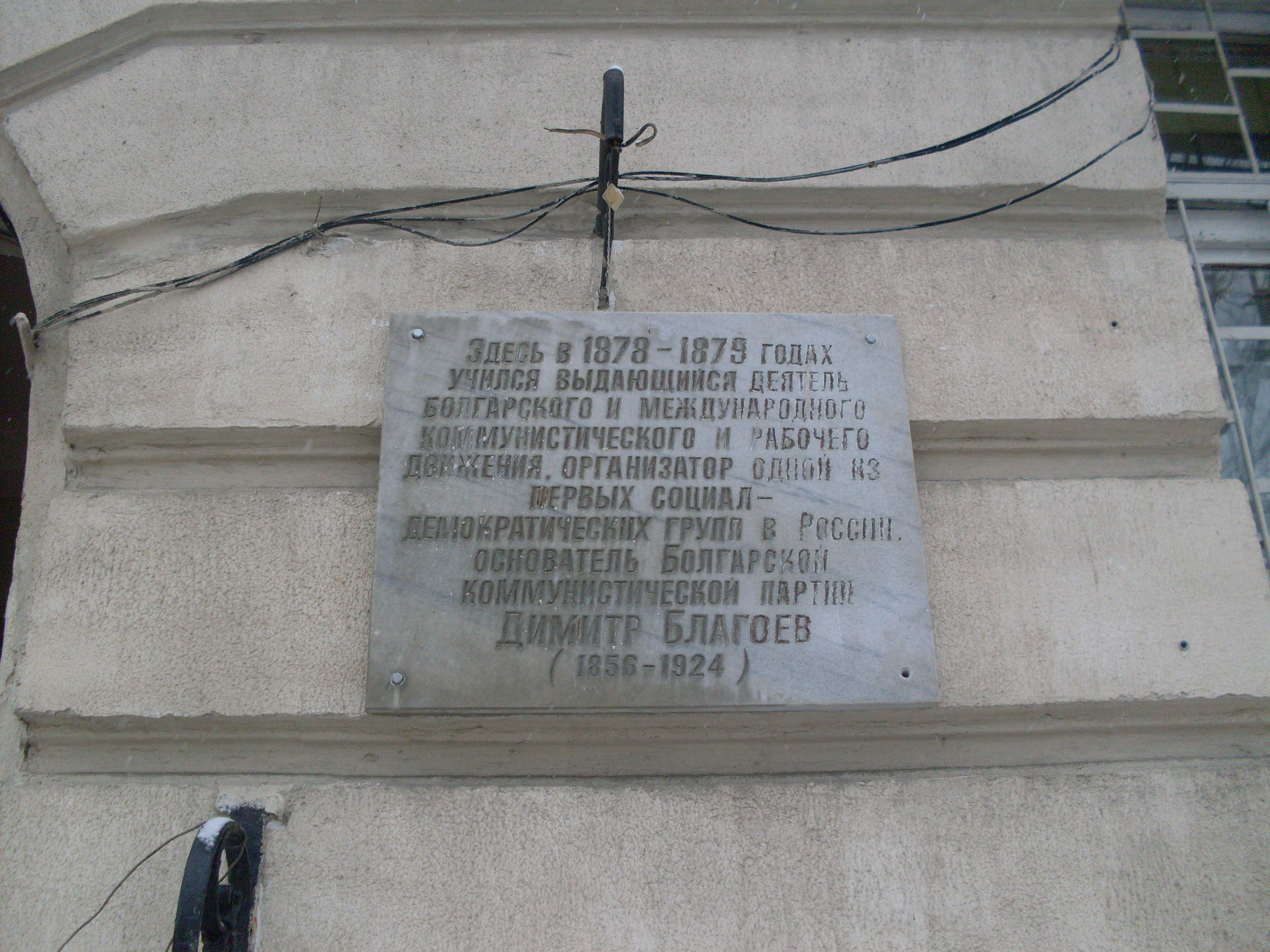
Memorial plaque in Odessa
