= Buzludzha =

Peak in the Balkan Mountains, Bulgaria

- Бузлуджа
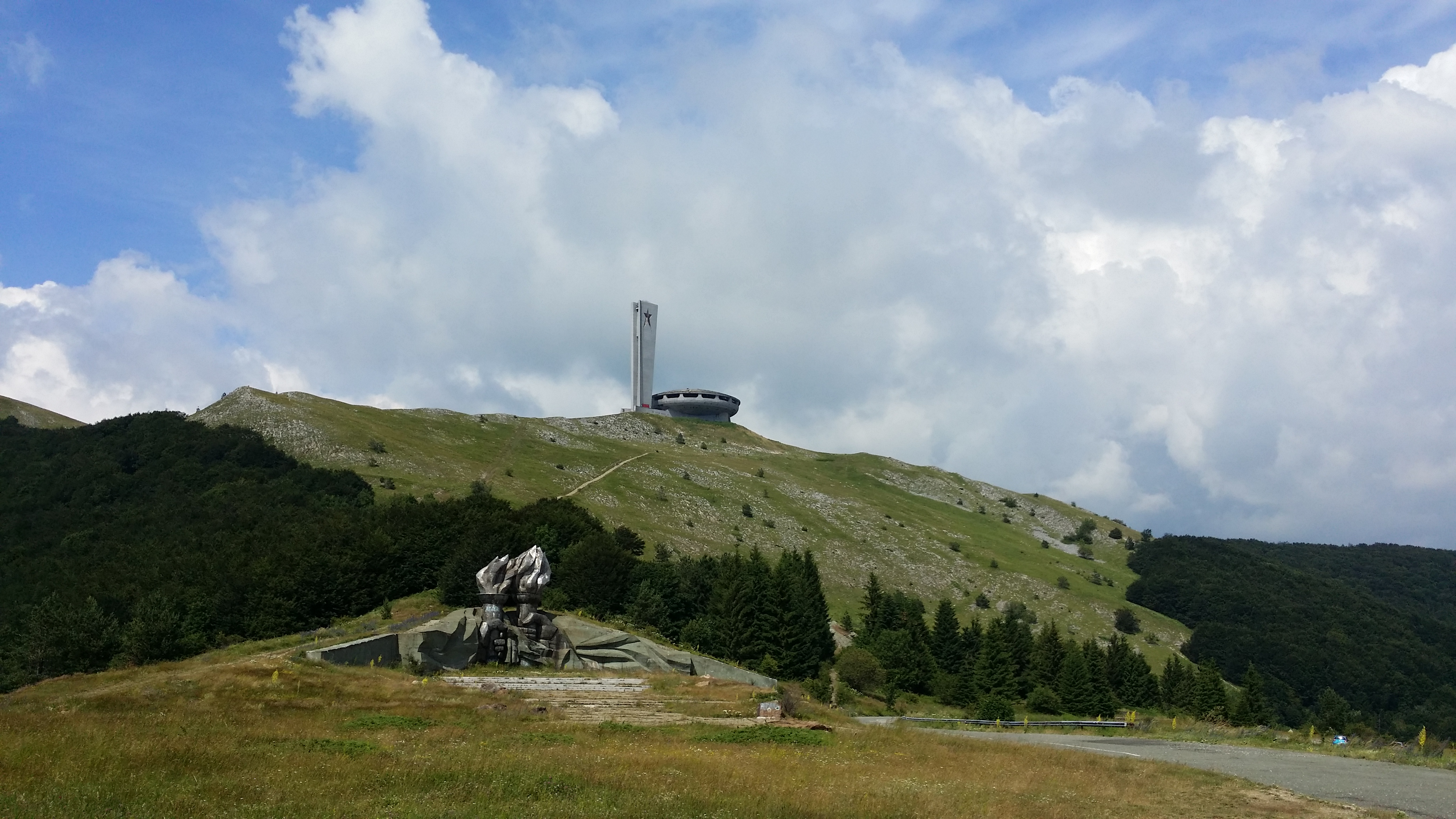

Highest point
- Elevation: 1,432 m (4,698 ft)
- Coordinates: 42°44′8.88″N 25°23′37.68″E

Geography
- Location within Bulgaria
- Location: Stara Zagora Province, Bulgaria
- Parent range: Balkan Mountains

Buzludzha (Bulgarian: Бузлуджа [ˈbuzɫod͡ʒɐ]) is a historical peak in the Central Balkan Mountains, Bulgaria. The mountain is located to the east of the Shipka Pass near the town of Kazanlak and is a site of historical importance. The peak is 1,432 metres (4,698 feet) high. It was renamed to Hadzhi Dimitar (Хаджи Димитър) in 1942 but remains popularly known as Buzludzha. The summit is limestone and granite. Its slopes are covered with grassy vegetation; its foothills and the neighbouring peaks sustain beech forests. The peak's name derives from Turkish: buzluca 'kind of icy'.

== History ==
In 1868 it was the place of the final battle between Bulgarian rebels led by Hadzhi Dimitar and Stefan Karadzha and forces of the Ottoman Empire. On 31 July, Hadzhi Dimitar and a band of 30 chetniks fought a losing battle against 700 Ottoman troops; only four Bulgarians survived. Their action served as an inspiration for the Liberation of Bulgaria from the Ottomans ten years later; the decisive battle of that conflict was fought a few miles away at the Shipka Pass. The battle of Buzludzha inspired the renown Bulgarian poet and revolutionary Hristo Botev to write the poem "Hadzhi Dimitar":

He who falls while fighting to be free
can never die: for him the sky
and earth, the trees and beasts shall keen,
to him the minstrel's song shall rise…

In 1891 the mountain was the site chosen for the first congress of the Bulgarian Social Democratic Workers Party (later the Bulgarian Communist Party) led by Dimitar Blagoev. In 1944 the peak was the scene of fighting between Communist partisans and detachments of the Bulgarian Army when the latter were attacked whilst operating there.

Following a desire for a national monument at the peak to commemorate these events (proposed as early as 1898) the Buzludzha Monument was built from 1974 to 1981, by public subscription. The site has several other monuments to its history: A statue of Hadzhi Dimitar, a relief of the 1891 Congress, and a monument to the partisans who fought there in 1944. In 1974, TNT blasting was employed to remove more than 15,000 cubic metres of rock and create a level foundation for building the new memorial house. As a result, the peak was lowered by 9 metres (30 feet) – from 1,441 metres (4,728 feet) to its current height of 1,432 metres (4,698 feet).

== Travel ==
Buzludzha can be reached by two side roads from the Shipka Pass: either a 16 km (10 mi) road from Kazanlak in the south or a 12 km (7 mi) road from Gabrovo on the north side of the mountain. Despite its deteriorating condition, Buzludzha has become a destination for tourists and urban explorers who are intrigued by its history and architecture.

== In popular culture ==
British pop singer Rita Ora released a short film for her 2021 EP Bang at various sites in Bulgaria including the Buzludzha monument.

== See also ==
- Bulgarka Nature Park

== Bibliography ==
Adrien Minard, Bouzloudja. Crépuscule d'une utopie, Paris, Éditions B2, 2018.
