= Konstantin Bozveliev =

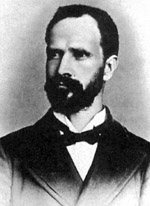
Konstantin Bozveliev

Konstantin Tenev Bozveliev (Bulgarian: Константин Тенев Бозвелиев, 10 November 1862 – 11 January 1951) was a Bulgarian socialist politician.

== Biography ==
Bozveliev was born in Constantinople (Istanbul), the capital of the Ottoman Empire, to the family of Bulgarian tobacco merchant Tenyo Bozveli. On his father's side, Bozveliev descended from the cleric and Bulgarian National Revival figure Neofit Bozveli. He attended a school in Kazanlak, even though he dropped out to find a job, he continued his studies and learned Russian and French by himself.

As a young radical, Bozveliev became active in Spiro Gulabchev's underground siromahomilstvo ("compassion on the poor") movement (a movement inspired by nihilist, anarchist, narodnik and Ukrainian federalist ideas). The movement was crushed by the regime in 1890. After the crack-down, Bozveliev took part in the Tarnovo meeting of socialists in May 1891, where the foundation of a socialist party was discussed. However, Bozveliev and Sava Mutafov (another former siromahomilstvo activist) opposed the foundation of a new party, as they were wary of government repression. The foundation of the party was postponed to a second meeting the same year. On 2 August 1891 the Bulgarian Social Democratic Party was founded, with Bozveliev as one of its twenty founders.

When the Bulgarian social democrats were divided in 1903, Bozveliev sided with Yanko Sakazov and joined his Bulgarian Social Democratic Workers' Party (Broad Socialists). In 1908 Bozveliev was elected mayor of Kazanlak (as a candidate of the Bulgarian Social Democratic Workers' Party (Broad Socialists)), the first Bulgarian socialist to be elected to the office of mayor.

On 26 February 1951 Bozveliev was found dead at the library and archive of the Iskra educational club. His body was encountered by the writer Dimitar Hristov Chorbadjisky ('Chudomir'), who noted that Bozveliev had died while going through historical papers in the archive.
