= Buzludzha Congress =

Constituent assembly of the Bulgarian Social Democratic Party

The Buzludzha Congress (Bulgarian: Бузлуджански Kонгрес, romanized: Buzɫudʒanski Kongrɛs) was the constituent assembly of the Bulgarian Social Democratic Party (Bulgarian: Българска социалдемократическа партия). It began on August 2, 1891, on Buzludzha peak on the initiative of Dimitar Blagoev. Around 20 members of the Socialist party from Tarnovo, Gabrovo, Dryanovo, Sliven, Kazanlak, Stara Zagora and other cities took part in the Congress. The Congress marked the end of the beginning phase of the Socialist movement in Bulgaria, and the beginning of organized party activity for the uniting of Socialism with the worker's movement. The Bulgarian Social Democratic Party took Marxism as its ideology.

== Preparation ==
The conference was held, from May 3 to May 5, 1891, in Veliko Tarnovo under the leadership of Dimitar Blagoev.

=== Attendance ===
The members in the meeting were:

- Dimitar Blagoev,
- Nikola Hr. Gabrovski,
- and Dragomir Gerganov, from Veliko Tarnovo.
- Mihail Ivanov,
- Mihail Boichinov,
- Mihail Radev,
- and Panayot Venkov, from Dryanovo.
- Unknown member, from Gabrovo.
- Sava Mutafov, from Sevlievo.
- Konstantin Bozveliev, from Kazanlak.

The main question in the meeting would be if they were to be shown to the public as a social-democratic party, and what their character would be. With no exceptions but the members from Sevlievo and Kazanlak, they decided to create a party, and that it did not have to be a worker's movement. Furthermore, they decided to lay the groundwork for the party on July 20, 1891, in the same Congress.

== Meetings ==
The meeting was conducted in secrecy, because Stefan Stambolov's government strongly controlled freedom of association in Bulgaria. Buzludzha and the time of the meeting were chosen due to the fact that at the same place and time, massive celebrations of the anniversary of the death of Hadzhi Dimitar were being held. Because of this, the small group remained unknown and held its meeting.

The Congress decided on an agenda and other matters for the Bulgarian Social Democratic party. The agenda, which was written like the French and Belgian workers' parties, contained the basis of Marxism. It stated that Bulgaria had (temporarily) gone down the path of Capitalism and that the Bulgarian socialists must collaborate and merge into a single party to await the oncoming Socialist "coup" and to organize and enlighten them. The members of the BSDP also approved the decentralized structure of the party and the autonomy of the smaller associations within it.

A General Soviet for the party to guide it was headquartered in Tarnovo. It decided that it was necessary to produce a weekly digest of the party and a series of brochures, which comprised the "Bulgarian Socialdemocratic Library" (Bulgarian: Българска социалдемократическа библиотека), whose first piece of literature was Dimitar Blagoev's book What is Socialism and is it Starting in Us?. For Socialist propaganda the party used Yanko Sakazov's edited newspaper "Day."
