= Bulgarian Social Democratic Party (1891) =

Bulgarian political party

Bulgarian Social Democratic Party Българска социалдемократическа партия
- Abbreviation: BSP
- Leader: Dimitar Blagoev
- Founded: August 2, 1891
- Dissolved: July 1894
- Merged into: BRSDP
- Ideology: Marxism
- Political position: Far-left
- Colours: Red

The Bulgarian Social Democratic Party (Bulgarian: Българска социалдемократическа партия, romanized: Balgarska Socialdemokraticheska Partiya; Bulgarian pronunciation: [ˈbɤ̞ɫgɐrskɐ sɔtsiʲˌaɫdɛmɔkratˈitʃɛskɐ partiʲɐ]) was a Marxist political party from 1891 to 1894 in Bulgaria. The Bulgarian Social Democratic Party was the first name of the party created by Dimitar Blagoev on the 1891 Buzludzha Congress. The party split in the next year with Yanko Sakazov founding the Bulgarian Socialdemocratic Union. It kept this name until its reunification with the Bulgarian Socialdemocratic Union in 1894, when both took the common name Bulgarian Workers' Social Democratic Party. The General Soviet of the Party was the central leading organ of the BSDP. After the reunification with the Bulgarian Social Democratic Union in 1894, its responsibilities were taken up by the Central Committee of the BWSDP.
