= Nashe Slovo =

Russian language newspaper in France

Nashe Slovo (Russian: Наше Слово, Our Word) was a daily Russian language socialist newspaper published in France during the First World War. Although it only appeared for a little over a year and a half, it had an impact across Europe.

== History ==
From 13 September 1914 a previous Russian language newspaper, Golos, had argued against participation in the First World War on the basis of international socialism. However it was banned in January 1915 by the Minister of the Interior, Louis Malvy. However Nashe Slovo was then published from 29 January 1915 until 15 September 1916. The Bulgarian Christian Rakovsky helped finance the paper. Originally each issue had four pages but this was reduced to two, to save money. The editorial team met every morning in the rue des Feuillantines, where they were based. They would discuss various issues of the day and get ready for the following day, on the basis of the information received. They would discuss the views defended by the various tendencies of Russian socialism.

Trotsky was an editor and attended the Zimmerwald Conference as a representative of Nashe Slovo. Other editors included Julius Martov,‌ and the newspaper's founder Vladimir Antonov-Ovseyenko.
