= Georgi Kirkov =

Bulgarian socialist politician and writer (1867–1919)

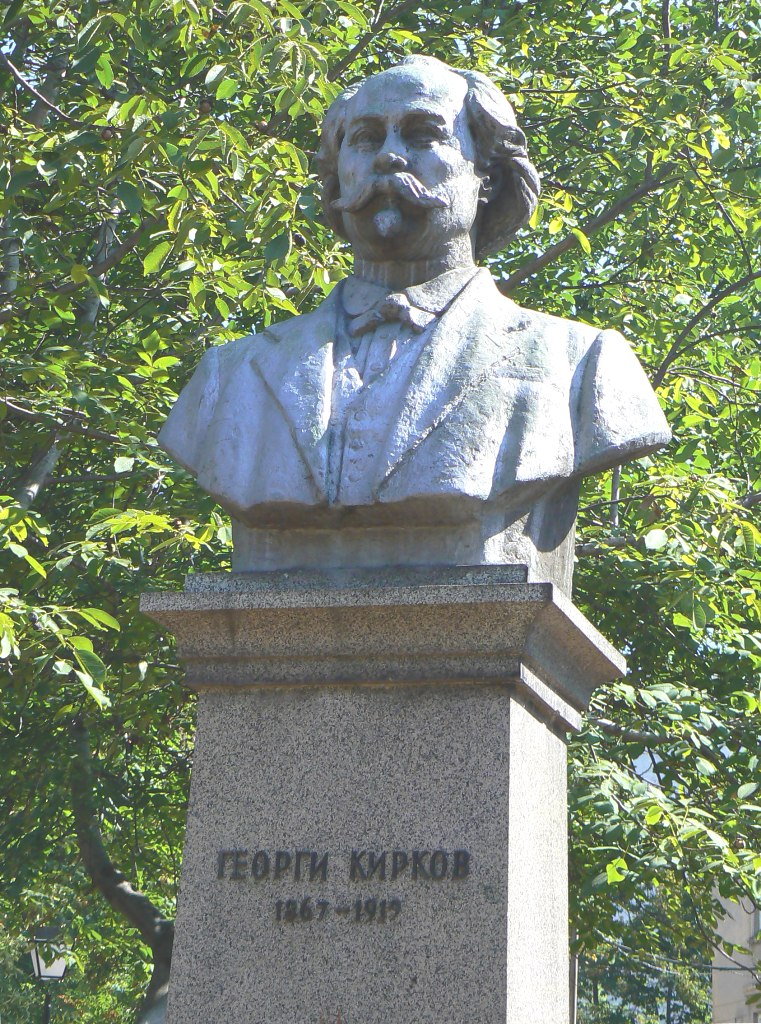
Monument of Georgi Kirkov in Sofia

Georgi Iordanov Kirkov (Bulgarian: Георги Йорданов Кирков; August 1867 – 25 August 1919), also known by the name Master (Майстора), was a prominent Bulgarian socialist politician and writer, one of the founders of the Bulgarian Workers’ Social Democratic Party (Narrow Socialists) (BWSDP[NS]).

From 1879 to 1886, Kirkov studied in Russia, where he became familiar with the works of the Russian revolutionary democrats and with underground Narodnik (Populist) literature. From 1886 to 1892 he lived in Bulgaria, and from 1892 to 1895 he studied in Vienna, where he took part in the Austrian labor movement. Again in Bulgaria from 1895, he joined the BWSDP the same year. From 1897 to 1905 he edited the central organ of the party, the newspaper Rabotnicheski vestnik. He became a member of the party’s Central Committee in 1898 and was elected and reelected to the National Assembly on the BWSDP slate. He fought to purge the party of opportunist elements and advanced a program for building a Marxist proletarian party. From 1905 to 1919, Kirkov was secretary of the Central Committee of the BWSDP(NS). In 1904 he set up a party printing plant in Sofia. He was secretary of the General Workers’ Trade Union from 1905 to 1909.

During the 22nd Congress of BRSDP ([NS]) in 1919, Kirkov was seriously ill, unable to attend, he only sends a congratulatory letter to the delegates. He died soon after. The next year, the faction was renamed to the Bulgarian Communist Party.
