= Yanko Sakazov =

Bulgarian politician

- Янко Сакъзов
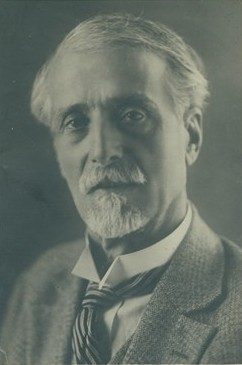
- Sakazov in 1930

Minister for Trade, Industry and Labour
- In office 28 November 1918 – 6 October 1919
- Prime Minister: Teodor Teodorov
- Preceded by: Georgi Danailov
- Succeeded by: Atanas Burov

Personal details
- Born: September 24, 1860 Şumnu, Özü Eyalet, Ottoman Empire
- Died: February 2, 1941 (aged 80) Sofia, Bulgaria
- Party: Bulgarian Social Democratic Union; Bulgarian Workers' Social Democratic Party; Bulgarian Social Democratic Workers' Party (Broad Socialists)
- Spouse: Anna Karima (m. 1888)
- Children: Ivan Sakazov
- Occupation: Politician, journalist

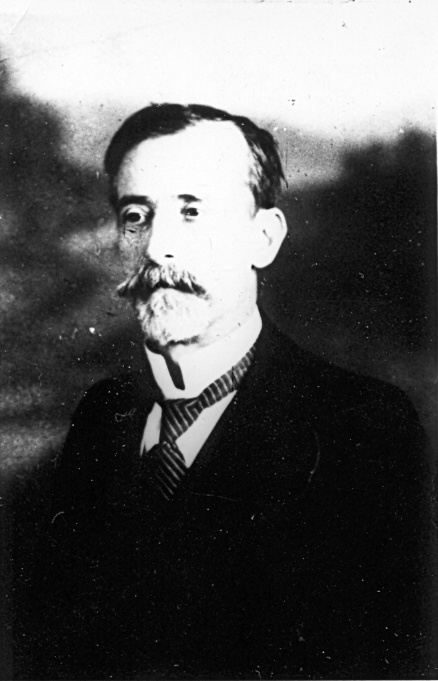
Portrait of Yanko Sakazov. Source: Bulgarian Archives State Agency

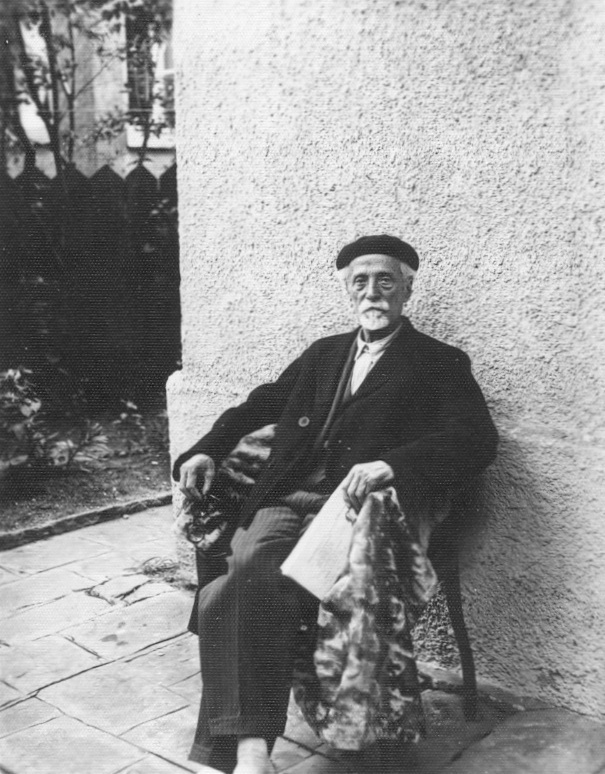
In his homeyard, 1939. Source: Bulgarian Archives State Agency

Yanko Ivanov Sakazov (Bulgarian: Янко Иванов Сакъзов; 24 September 1860 – 2 February 1941) was a Bulgarian socialist politician.

Sakazov was a native of Shumen, then part of the Ottoman Empire. He went abroad for studies during his youth, studying in Western Europe and the Russian Empire. He was a student of natural sciences, philosophy and history in the German Empire, biology in the United Kingdom and literature and art criticism in France. After his return to Bulgaria, he was one of the founders of the Bulgarian Social Democratic Union in 1892.

Sakazov edited the Shumen-based publication Den ('Day') between 1891 and 1896.

Sakazov was one of two candidates of the Bulgarian Social Democratic Workers' Party elected to the National Assembly in the 1894 election (the other being Gabrovski). Sakazov represented the rural constituency Novi Pazar. Sakazov and Gabrovski were the two first socialist parliamentarians in the history of Bulgaria. Sakazov became a parliamentarian again in 1911, and as the sole socialist deputy in the National Assembly he voted against increased military spending in 1912.

In 1900 Sakazov founded the publication Obshto delo ('Common Action'), around which the moderate faction of the party rallied. Sakazov's followers became known as 'Broad Socialists'. In 1903 the party was divided into two, with Sakazov's faction forming the Bulgarian Social Democratic Workers' Party (Broad Socialists).

Sakazov served as Minister for Trade, Industry and Labour between 1918 and 1919.

Sakazov was the representative of the Bulgarian Broad Socialists in the Executive of the Labour and Socialist International from 1923 to 1940 (the entire period of existence of the international). Until August 1925 Sakazov's seat was shared with the Yugoslav socialist leader Živko Topalović.
