= Bulgarian Workers' Social Democratic Party =

1894–1907 political party in Bulgaria

Bulgarian Workers' Social Democratic Party Българска работническа социалдемократическа партия
- Abbreviation: BRSDP
- Leader: Dimitar Blagoev; Yanko Sakazov
- Founded: July 1894
- Dissolved: March 22, 1903
- Merger of: BSP; BSDU
- Succeeded by: BSDWP (NS); BSDWP (BS)
- Headquarters: Sofia
- Newspaper: Rabotnicheski Vestnik; Novo Vreme; Sotsialist; Narod; Obshto Delo
- Ideology: Marxist socialism Social democracy
- Political position: Left-wing

The Bulgarian Workers' Social Democratic Party (Bulgarian: Българска работническа социалдемократическа партия, romanized: Bălgarska rabotničeska socialdemokratičeska partija; BRSDP) was a Bulgarian leftist group founded in 1894.

== History ==
In July 1891, on the initiative of Dimitar Blagoev, the social democratic circles of Tarnovo, Gabrovo, Sliven, Stara Zagora, Kazanlak and other cities united to form the Bulgarian Social Democratic Party. The marxist nucleus of the BSDP (later, the so-called Partists), which Blagoev headed, was opposed by a group who were essentially opposed to making the social democratic movement into a party. In 1892 this group, led by Yanko Sakazov, founded a reformist organization, the Bulgarian Social Democratic Union (hence their name, Unionists). In 1894, Blagoev's supporters agreed to unite with the Unionists in the interests of working-class unity and took the name Bulgarian Social Democratic Workers' Party. The First Congress (July 1894), at which the Unionists were in the majority, adopted a program and statutes that were primarily' reformist. They gained the majority in the leadership.

The struggle of the Marxist wing against the reformists brought its first significant results at the Fourth Congress (July 1897). Congress changed the statutes and decided to publish the newspaper Rabotničeski vestnik for agitation and propaganda among the workers. Blagoev became the editor of the theoretical organ, the magazine Novo vreme, which was published beginning in January 1897. In 1900, in the context of extensive peasant unrest in Bulgaria, the reformist elements grouped themselves around the magazine Obšto delo, edited by Sakyzov, which propagandized the idea of class cooperation. The Eighth Congress of the party (July 1901) rejected this idea. A split was unavoidable due to deep ideological and tactical differences within the party. At the Tenth Party Congress in 1903, the Marxists formed a separate Bulgarian Social Democratic Workers' Party (Narrow Socialists). The reformists, so-called Broad Socialists, who wanted to transform the party into a broad organization of all "productive strata", formed their reformist party, the Bulgarian Social Democratic Workers' Party (Broad Socialists).

== See also ==
- Macedonian-Adrianople Social Democratic Group
