= Svoboda ili smart =

Motto of Bulgarian comitadjies

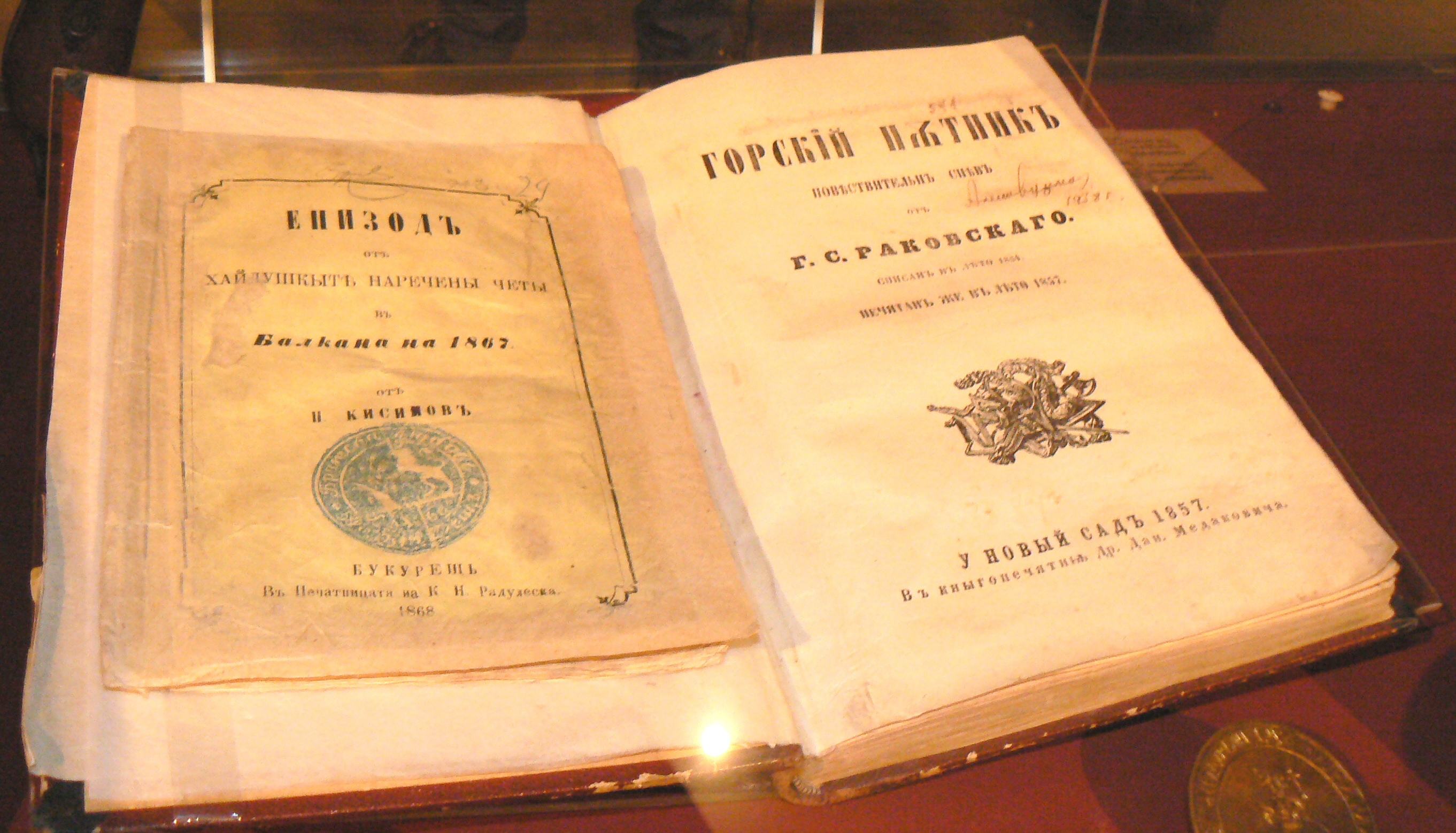
The book of Rakovski Gorski Patnik (Forest wanderer), where the motto appeared for the first time in 1857.

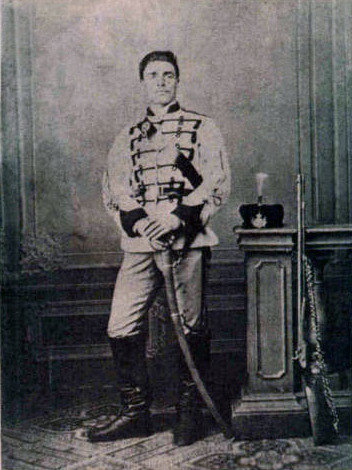
Vasil Levski in a 1st Bulgarian Legion uniform in 1862. The legionnaires wore caps, on which metal lions marked with the motto were attached.

Svoboda ili smart (Bulgarian: Свобода или смърт, lit. 'Freedom or Death', written in pre-1945 Bulgarian orthography: "Свобода или смърть") was a revolutionary slogan used during the national-liberation struggles by the Bulgarian revolutionaries, called comitadjis. The slogan was in use during the second half of the 19th and the first half of the 20th centuries.

== History ==
For the first time, the slogan appeared in Georgi Rakovski's poem "Горски пътник", written in 1854 and issued in 1857. The plot of this poem concerns a Bulgarian who recruits a rebel cheta to mutiny against the Turks. He most likely accepted and transliterated the slogan Eleftheria i thanatos from the Greek liberation struggles, which was a national motto of Greece. Rakovski summoned his fellow countrymen to go to the battlefields under the banners of the Bulgarian lion. The flag with the lion was provided in 1858, when he stipulated that the national flag will have on its front side a lion depicted and the inscription "Svoboda ili smart" and on its reverse side a Christian cross and the inscription "God with us, forward!". It was used for the first time during the 1860s from the Bulgarian Legions in Serbia. Then Georgi Rakovski ordered a flag and a seal with the inscriptions "Свобода или смърть". Bulgarian committees used the same slogan on their flags during the April uprising of 1876. Ivan Vazov wrote the poem "Свобода или смърть" in the same year. During the Kresna–Razlog uprising in 1878, there was a banner with such inscription, prepared by the Unity Committee. During the Bulgarian unification of 1885, flags with this inscription were also waived by members of the Bulgarian Secret Central Revolutionary Committee. The Bulgarian Internal Macedonian-Adrianople Revolutionary Organization, established in 1893 in the Ottoman Empire, also accepted the same slogan. In the Ilinden Uprising, the Kruševo Republic's flag contained the motto. The motto was also used by the Sofia-based Supreme Macedonian-Adrianople Revolutionary Committee between 1894 and 1904. During the Balkan Wars the volunteers from the Macedonian-Adrianopolitan Volunteer Corps in Bulgarian army, had several flags with this motto. In interwar Greece and Yugoslavia the motto was used by the pro-Bulgarian Internal Macedonian Revolutionary Organisation and Internal Thracian Revolutionary Organisation. In interwar Romania, it was used by the pro-Bulgarian Internal Dobrujan Revolutionary Organisation in Southern Dobruja. During the Second World War, this motto was utilized by the pro-Bulgarian Ohrana active in Northern Greece. The uniforms of the Ohranists were supplied by the Italians and were resplendent with shoulder patches bearing the inscription "Italo-Bulgarian Committee: Freedom or Death". It was also utilized as title of several newspapers of these organizations.

Bulgarian flag with the motto.

== Post-WWII references ==
Banner presenting the motto written in post-1944 Macedonian language as the original slogan of the defunct in 1934 IMRO.

After 1944 in SFR Yugoslavia a distinct Macedonian language was codified and separate Macedonian nation was recognized. Macedonian became the first official language in the newly proclaimed SR Macedonia, Serbo-Croatian was the second official language, as it was the official language of SFR Yugoslavia, while Bulgarian was prohibited. The Bulgarian spelling "Свобода или смърть", used by the Internal Macedonian-Adrianople Revolutionary Organization, was transformed into Macedonian as "Слобода или смрт". All documents written by IMRO revolutionaries in standard Bulgarian were translated into Macedonian. Today in North Macedonia the motto has been sometimes described as written originally in Macedonian, which has caused protests from Bulgaria. As part of the controversial Skopje 2014 project, street lamps were mounted in the center of Skopje, on which the inscription "Свобода или смърть" is readable.

== Artifacts with the motto ==
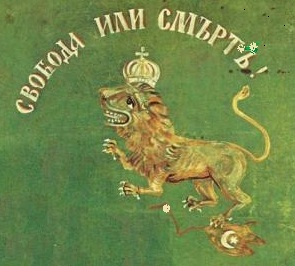
Flag of the Bulgarian legion from 1862.

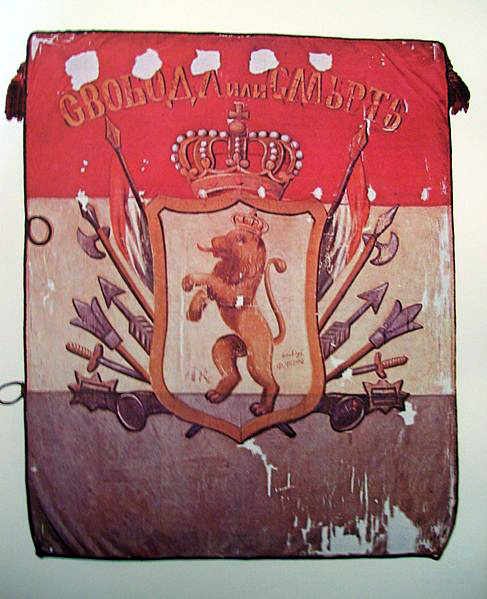
Flag of Filip Totyu's cheta from 1867.

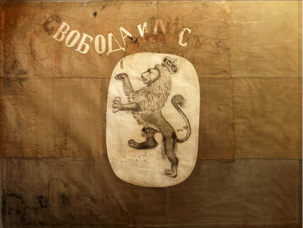
Flag of the Stara Zagora revolt from 1875.

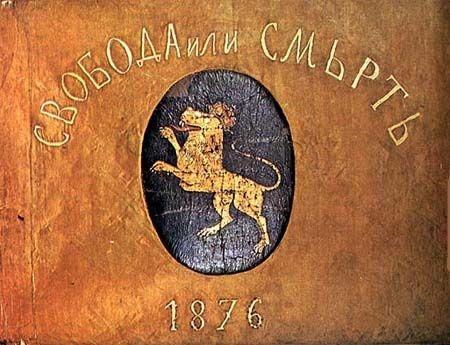
The flag of the April Uprising from 1876, sewn by Rayna Knyaginya.

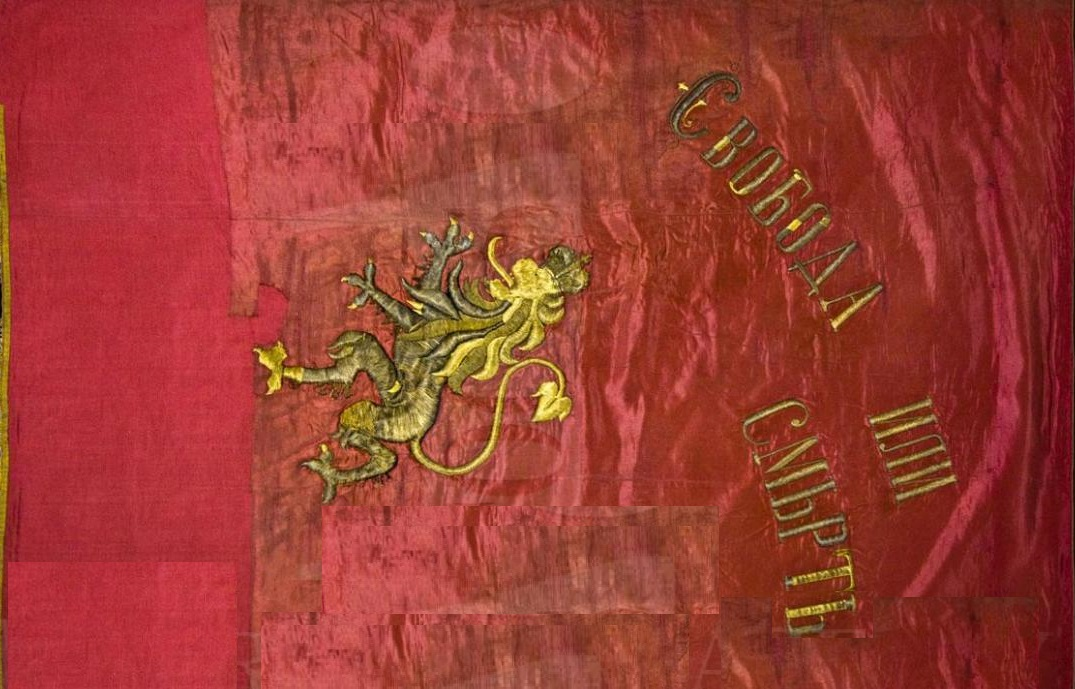
Tarnovo cheta's Bulgarian Unification flag from 1885.

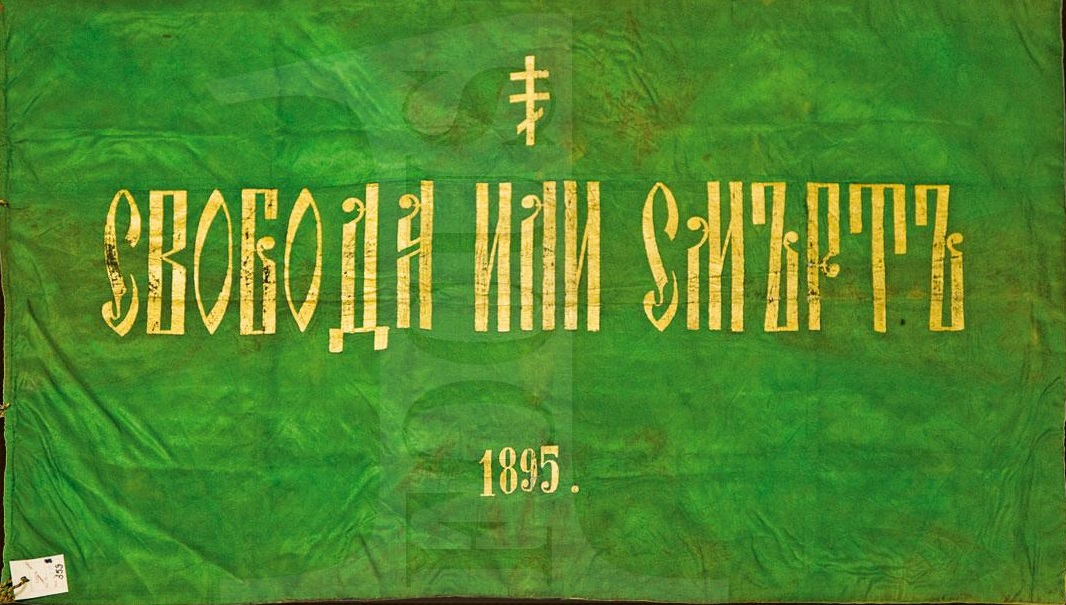
Gorna Dzhumaya rebellion flag from 1895.

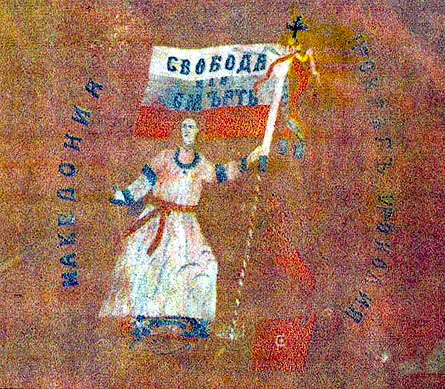
The banner of the insurgents from Ohrid from 1903.

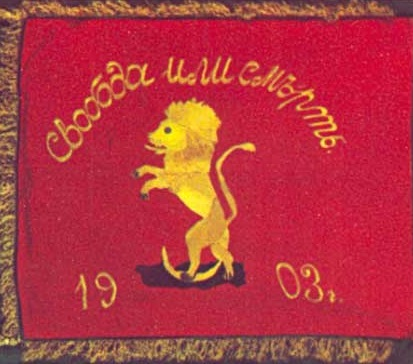
The banner of the insurgents from Smoljan from 1903.

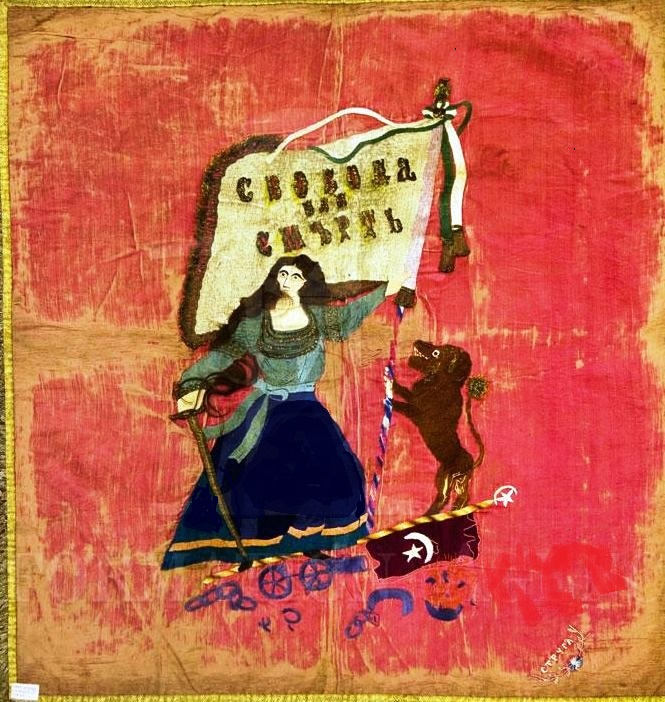
The banner of the insurgents from Struga from 1903.

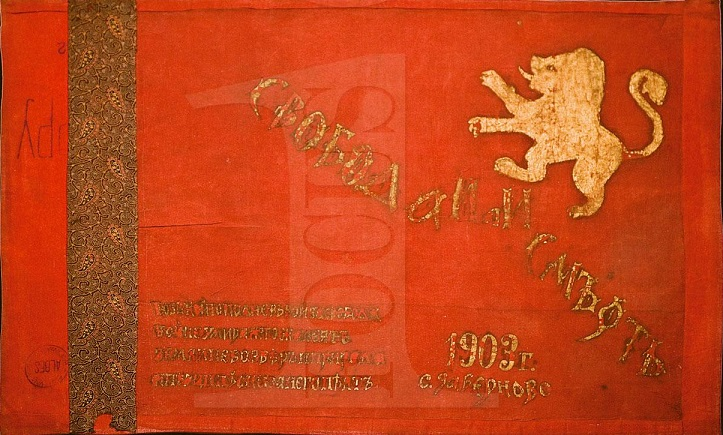
The banner of the insurgents from Zabernovo from 1903.

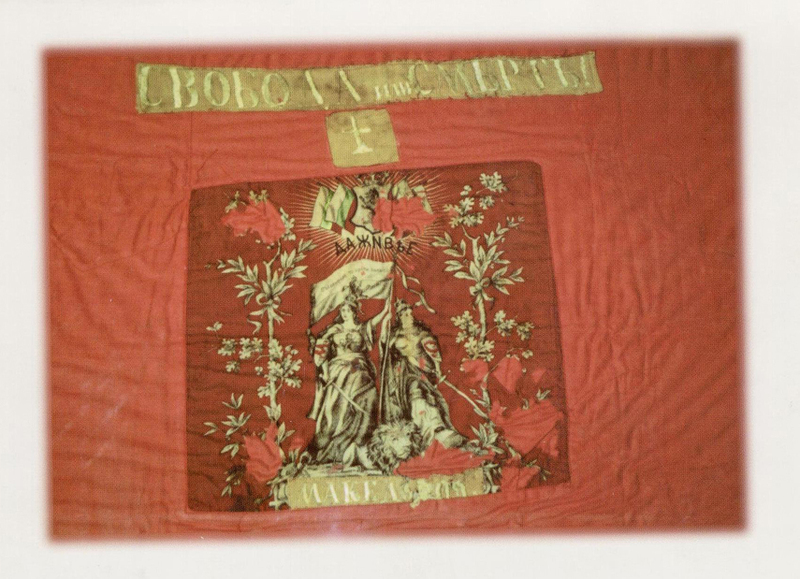
The banner of the insurgents from Dobrolishta, Kastoria from 1903.

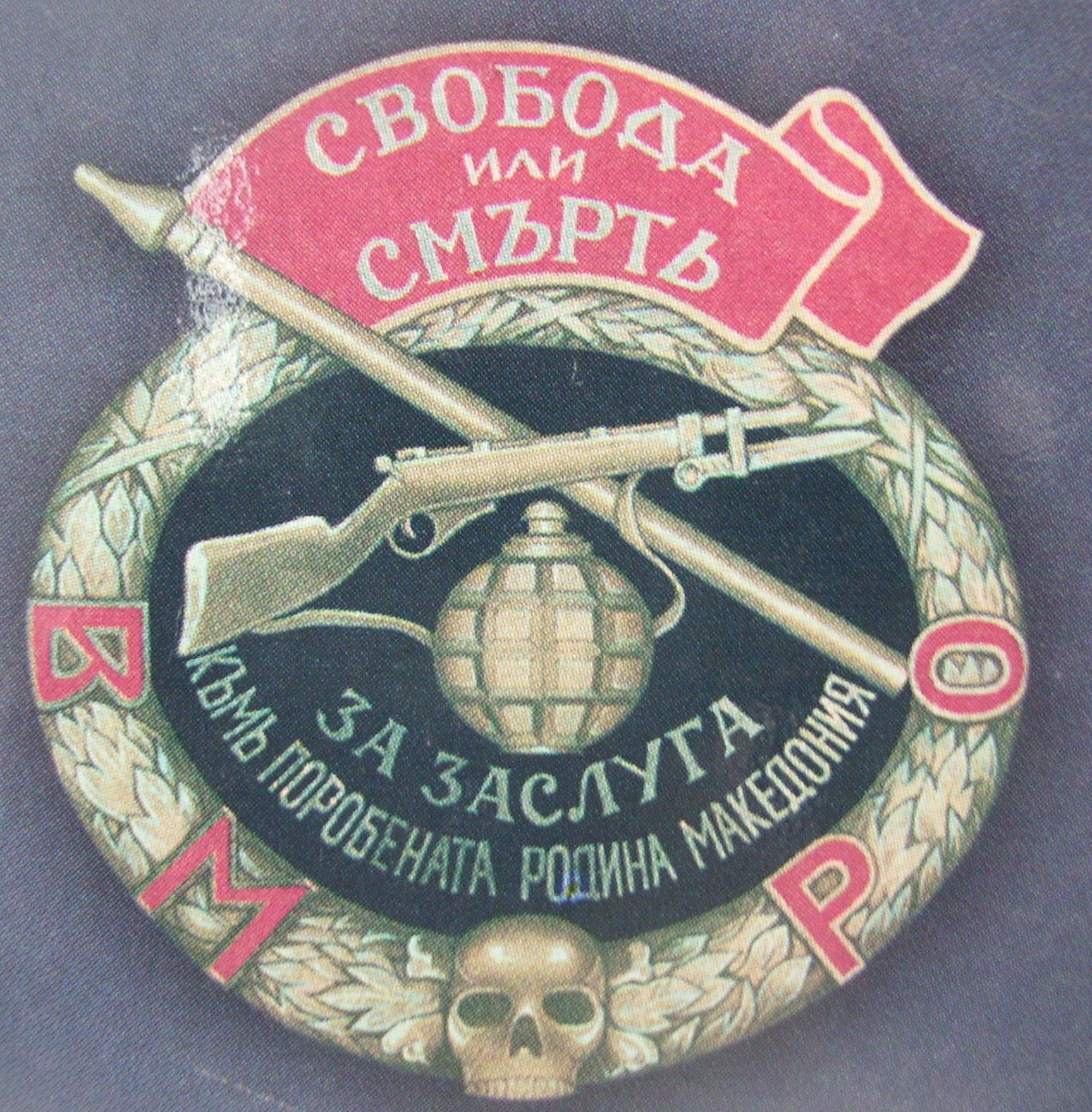
IMRO merit badge from ca. 1925.

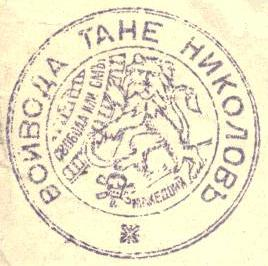
The stamp of Tane Nikolov, leader of ITRO

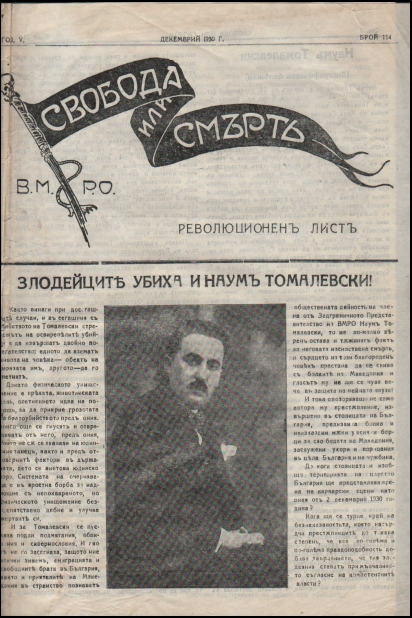
The newspaper of IMRO "Liberty of Death", issue from 1930.

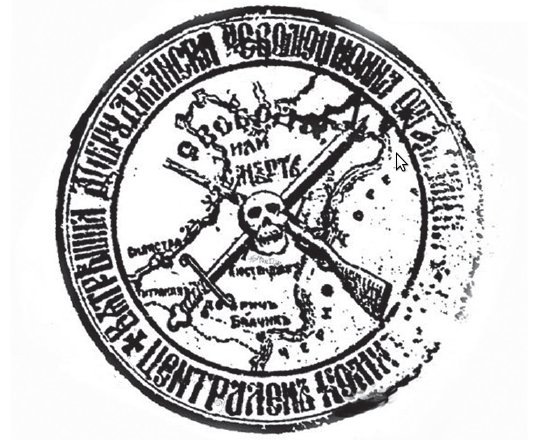
IDRO stamp from 1930s.

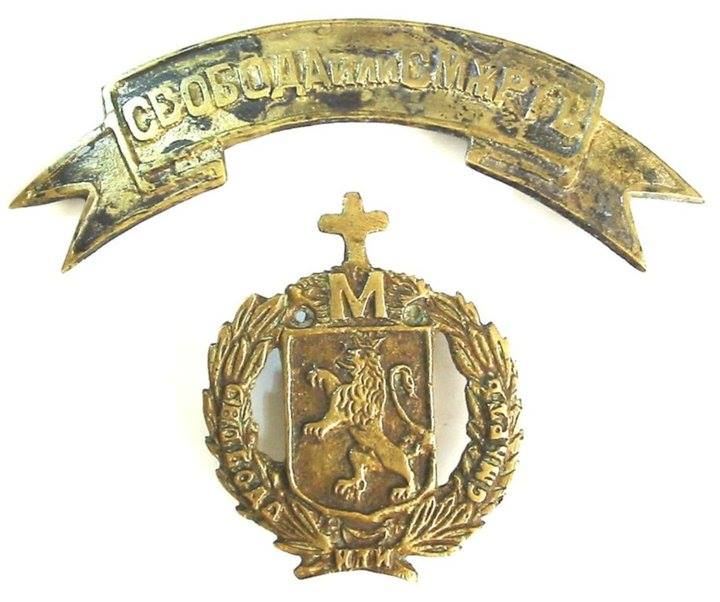
SMAC cockade with the motto and Bulgarian lion

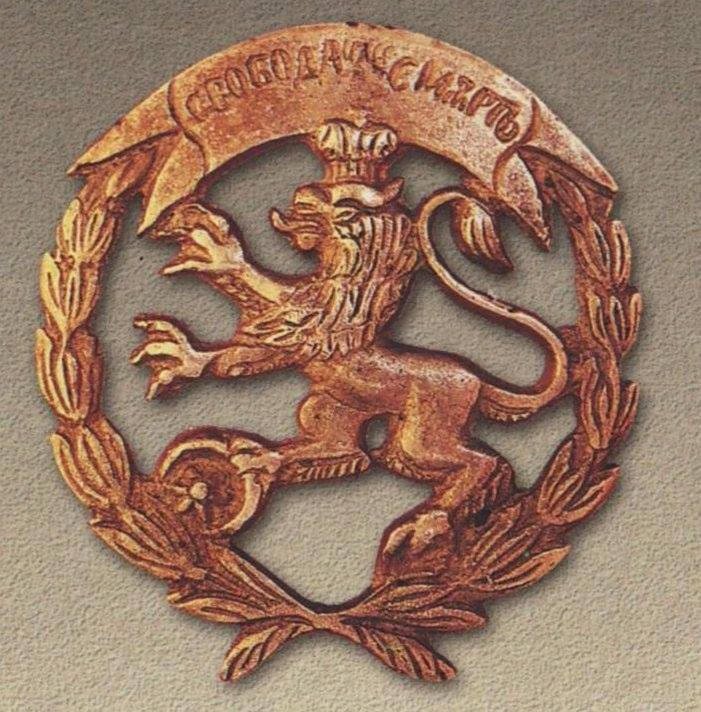
SMAC cockade with the motto and Bulgarian lion

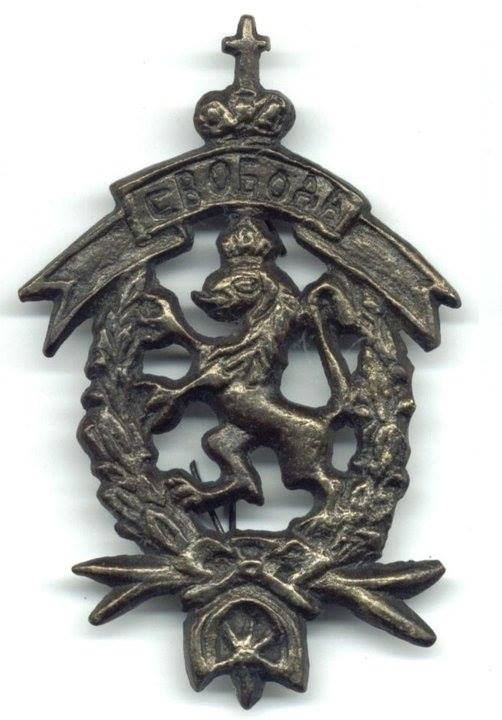
SMAC cockade with the motto and Bulgarian lion

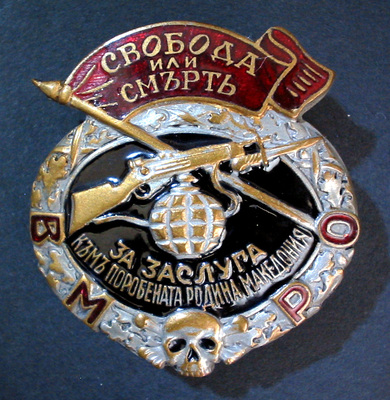
IMRO cockade with the motto

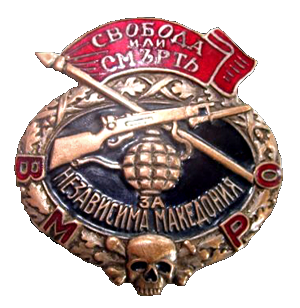
IMRO cockade with the motto

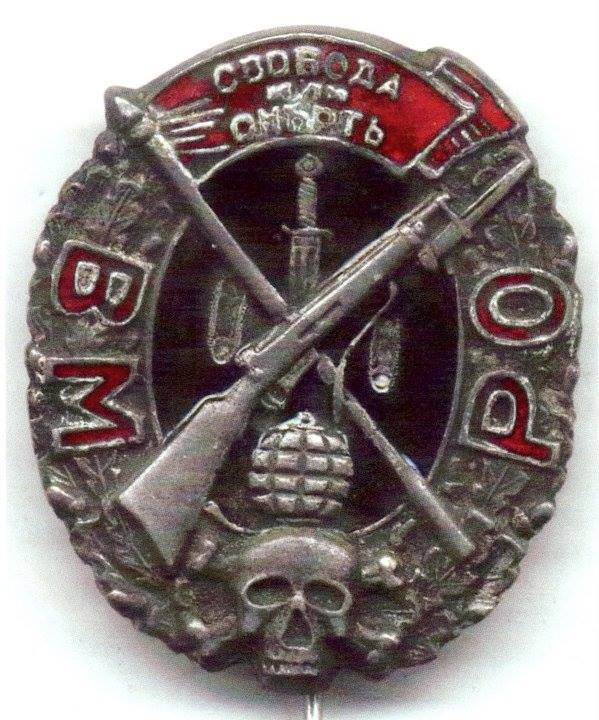
IMRO cockade with the motto

== See also ==
- "Give me liberty or give me death!"
- Flags of Internal Macedonian-Adrianople Revolutionary Organization
