= Mamin Kolyu =

Voivode Mamin Kolyu
- Мамин Колю
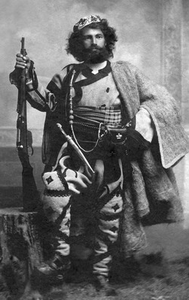
- Mamin Kolyu c. 1907
- Born: Nikola Koev Nikolov (Никола Коев Николов); 20 March 1880; Haskovo, Eastern Rumelia, Ottoman Empire (now Bulgaria)
- Died: 30 July 1961 (aged 81); Haskovo, People's Republic of Bulgaria
- Relatives: Tane Nikolov (uncle)
- Military career
- Allegiance: Tsardom of Bulgaria; IMRO
- Branch: Bulgarian Army
- Service years: 1901-1902 (Bulgarian Army); 1903-1913 (IMRO); 1920-1924 (IMRO)
- Unit: 10th Rhodopean Infantry Regiment
- Conflicts: Ilinden Uprising; Macedonian Struggle; Balkan Wars; First Balkan War; Second Balkan War
- Other work: Police officer Miller

Nikola Koev Nikolov (Bulgarian: Никола Коев Николов; 20 March 1880 – 30 July 1961), known as Mamin Kolyu (Мамин Колю, "Mummy's Kolyu", Kolyu being a diminutive of Nikola) was a Bulgarian revolutionary of the Internal Macedonian-Adrianopolitan Revolutionary Organization (IMARO) who fought for the liberation of Macedonia and Thrace from Ottoman rule.

Mamin Kolyu was born on 20 March 1880 in Haskovo (then part of Eastern Rumelia) as revolutionary Tane Nikolov's older brother's son. After finishing primary school, he enlisted in the 10th Rhodopean Infantry Regiment of the Bulgarian Army and served from January 1901 to November 1902. He joined the ranks of IMARO as a soldier and after his discharge went for Sofia to become a member of a detachment (cheta) and fight in Macedonia. In 1903, he entered Macedonia under the command of Ivan Naumov Alyabaka.

During the Ilinden–Preobrazhenie Uprising of 1903, he set the Ottoman gendarmerie's barracks in Kruševo on fire together with Kosta Hristov Popeto. As the uprising was crushed, he returned to Bulgaria. In 1904, he assaulted the Turkish consul's carriage in Sofia together with Alyabaka, injuring the consul's bodyguard and forcing the Bulgarian government to sentence them. Six months later, they were quietly released without amnesty and told to stay out of the government's way. Upon his release he immediately headed to Macedonia and served as a revolutionary under Kosta Popeto, Ivan Naumov, Apostol Petkov and Ichko Gyupchev. During the unrest at the time he joined Hristo Chernopeev's band to dethrone and capture Sultan Abdul Hamid II from Istanbul and take him to Thessaloniki.

From 1912 on, Mamin Kolyu was an under-voivode and flag bearer in his uncle Tane Nikolov's band and took part in the Balkan Wars, becoming an independent voivode. In the winter of 1912 and the spring of 1913, he participated in the Bulgarian Exarchate's christianization mission in the Rhodopes. After the liberation of Western Thrace (which was ceded to Bulgaria per the Treaty of Bucharest), Mamin Kolyu married in a village near Gyumyurdzhina (today Komotini, Greece). From 1914 to 1919 he lived in Bulgarian Ksanti (today Xanthi, Greece) and Komotini and was a policeman for some time. In 1920–1924, when the region was already part of Greece, he collaborated with the Internal Thracian Revolutionary Organisation in Haskovo and Western Thrace.

In 1924, Mamin Kolyu withdrew from his revolutionary activities and worked as a miller in Asenovgrad with Tane Nikolov until 1945. From 1949 until his death on 30 July 1961, he lived in Haskovo. A vivid personality, Mamin Kolyu became a favourite of the population of Macedonia and Thrace: folk songs about him have been sung from Gora in Kosovo to the west (song from Gora) to Dobruja on the Black Sea to the east (song from Dobruja).
