= Ivan Naumov =

Bulgarian revolutionary

Ivan Naumov Alyabaka
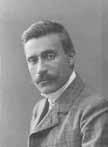
- A photograph of Ivan Naumov Alyabaka
- Born: Around 1870; Oraovec, Ottoman Empire (now North Macedonia)
- Died: August 24, 1907; Belica, Ottoman Empire (now North Macedonia)
- Organization: IMARO

Ivan Naumov (Bulgarian: Иван Наумов), nicknamed Alyabaka or Alyabako was a Bulgarian revolutionary, a member of the Internal Macedonian-Adrianople Revolutionary Organization (IMARO).

== Biography ==
Ivan Naumov was born in the village of Oraovec, Veles region, in a poor family. Because of the lack of finances, he was not able to study and went to work in Thessaloniki. There he learnt about the ideas of the revolutionary organization IMARO and in 1900 he was invited to join the organization by Mihail Apostolov Popeto. He worked as a grocer in Drama and Kavala.

Stoyan Avramov described Ivan Naumov as follows:

Alyabaka was a tall, broad-shouldered and strong man with a dark face and black hair, that made him appear as a Moor. This was the reason he was nicknamed "Alyabak". His look of an eagle, belligerent spirit, gait, courage, self-denial and faith in the cause, raised him in the eyes of his friends and opponents. During the battles, both with Turks and Serbs, he attacked like a furious lion, carrying his fellow freedom fighters with him. In the regions of Veles, Prilep and Porechie he was the only leader, who frightened the Serbian propaganda, whose agents treated him as invincible and invulnerable.

In 1902 he killed a Turk and escaped to Sofia. The same year, he returned as a freedom fighter in the regions of Odrin and Pashmakli. From the beginning of 1903, he was an organizational leader in the region of Krushevo. During the Ilinden-Preobrazhenie Uprising, he headed one of the sections that participated in the burning of the police station in Krushevo.

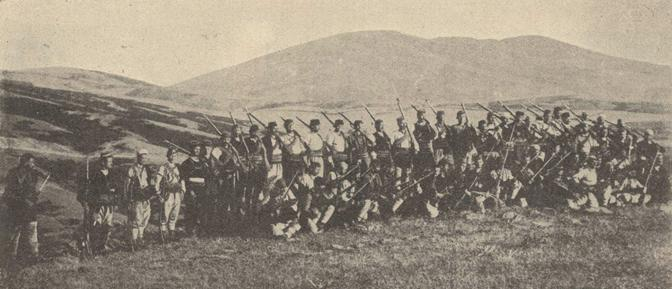
The revolutionary band of Ivan Naumov Alyabaka

After the uprising, he went back to Bulgaria. In 1904, he was arrested in Sofia, together with Mamin Kolyu, after the unsuccessful attempt to murder the Turkish consul. They were arrested for six months because of this action in which the consul's bodyguard was wounded. Afterwards, he entered Macedonia again as a leader of a revolutionary band. When certain disagreements happened in the IMARO, he was among the supporters of Boris Sarafov. As a leader of a revolutionary band, he toured the regions of Veles, Prilep, Kičevo and Porečje, but because of his conflict with Stefan Dimitrov, who was a leader of a revolutionary band operating in the Veles region, he was ordered not to return there. Ivan Naumov had battles not only with the Turkish military, but also with the Serbian armed propaganda. In 1904, his and Bobi Stoychev’s band were destroyed by the Turkish military, when 16 of his 20 freedom fighters were killed. The same year, a skirmish between his band and Stefan Dimitrov’s band occurred, but fortunately they agreed on the misunderstandings without causing casualties.

In 1905, Ivan Naumov's band expelled Dimitar Chupovski from Macedonia, who came to Veles to spread the Misirkov's ideas, which were considered as "pro-Serbian" and "anti-Bulgarian".

In the summer of 1907, Alyabaka entered Macedonia as a leader of one of the largest revolutionary bands, which had 60 freedom fighters, mostly soldiers of the Bulgarian army. Konstantin Kyurkchiev was among its members. This band participated in the Battle of Nozhot (the Knife) and Popadiski Chukari together with the bands of Tane Nikolov, Mihail Chakov, Hristo Tsvetkov, that came from Bulgaria, as well as with the regional bands of Gyore Spirkov and Mircho Naydov, from Prilep, and the village bands of Sekula Oraovdolski and Velko Popadiyski.

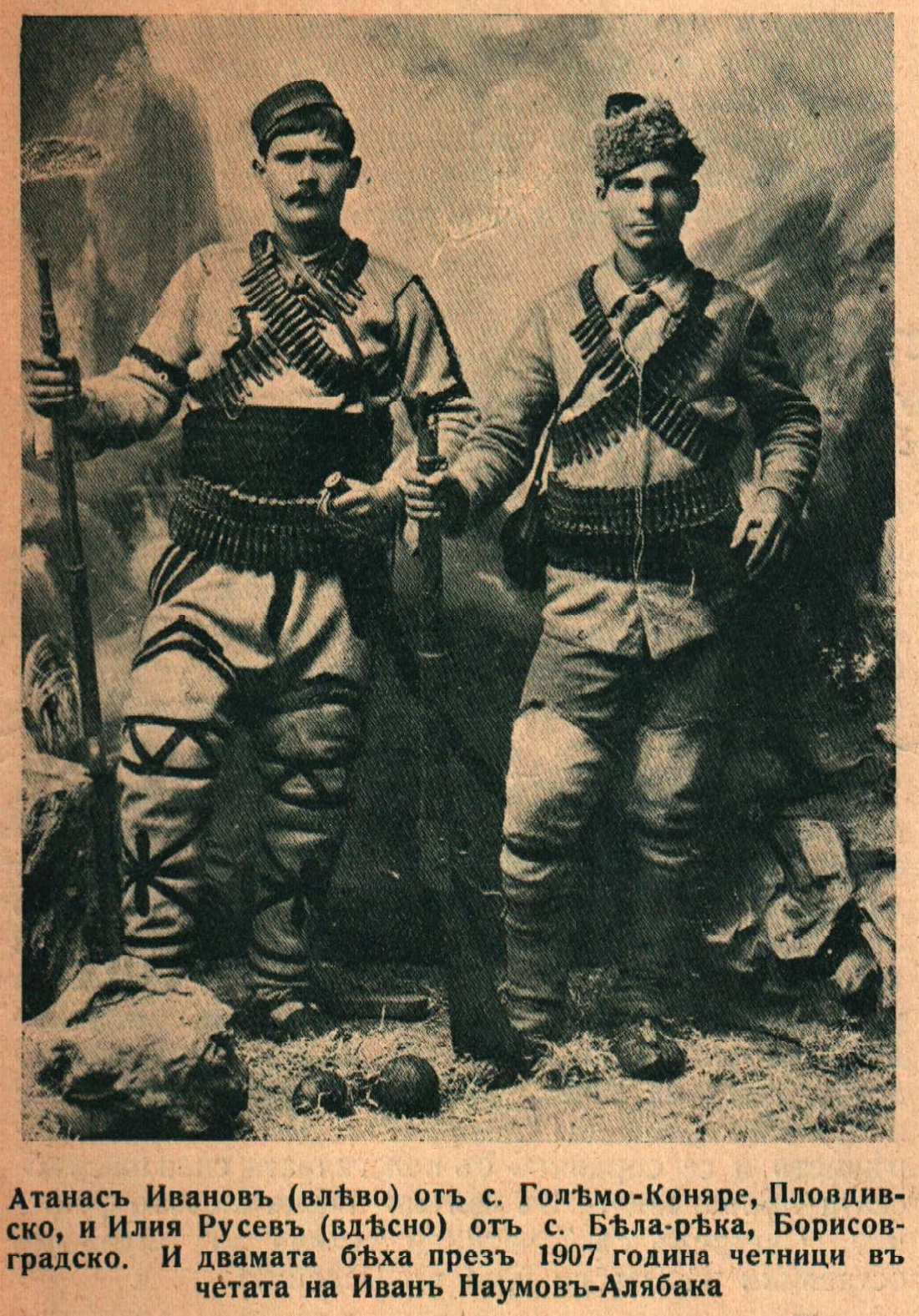
Atanas Ivanov from Golyamo Konare and Iliya Rusev from Byala Reka, members of Ivan Naumov's revolutionary band

The same year in August, while he returned from the congress of the IMARO's Bitola revolutionary region, held at the Prostranska Mountain, at which he was elected inspector of the bands, Alyabaka witnessed the kidnapping of a girl from the village of Belica by Arnauts. He went to save the girl and the ordinary skirmish with the bandits soon turned into a battle with the Turkish military, which came in the meantime. Ivan Naumov was killed in this battle and the inhabitants of Belica buried him beneath the altar of the local church.

== Notes ==
- Енциклопедия България, том 4, Издателство на БАН, София, 1984.
