= Ljubica Ivošević Dimitrov =

Serbian textile worker, labour activist and poet (1884 – 1933)

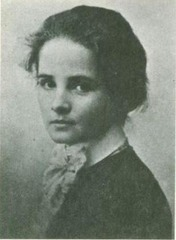
- Born: 17 July 1884; Saranovo, Serbia
- Died: 27 May 1933 (aged 48); Moscow, Soviet Union
- Spouse: Georgi Dimitrov
- Writing career
- Genres: Poetry, journalism

Ljubica Ivošević Dimitrov (Serbian: Љубица Ивошевић-Димитров; Bulgarian: Люба Ивошевич-Димитрова; 17 July 1884 – 27 May 1933) was a Serbian and Bulgarian textile worker, labour activist, newspaper editor and the first Serbian proletarian poet.

== Biography ==
Born on 17 July 1884 in the village of Saranovo near Rača in central Serbia, Ljubica Ivošević was the youngest child of Milovan and Milica Ivošević. When she was 16, she went to Smederevska Palanka with one of her brothers as a textile worker and joined the labor movement (Opšte zanatlijsko radničko društvo or General Artisan Workers Society).

In 1902, she moved to Bulgaria and became a member of the Bulgarian Social Democratic Workers' Party (Narrow Socialists). After a short stay in Ruse she moved to Sliven where in 1903 she met and in 1906 married unionist and socialist Georgi Dimitrov who came from a family of working class activists. They moved to Sofia in 1904, where she began to work in a luxury sewing attire shop, and became a manager there. She published her poems in Bulgarian and Serbian left-wing newspapers. From 1909 to 1912, she was the editor of the Bulgarian newspaper Шивашки работник ("Tailoring Worker"). From 1914, she became a member of the Central Women's Committee of the Bulgarian Narrow Socialists. In 1920, she was a Narrow Socialists envoy to the Yugoslav Communist Party Congress in Belgrade.

After the September Uprising of 1923 she emigrated with her husband to Austria. Ljubica had spent time in Vienna and she taught her husband the German language. Later they moved to the Soviet Union. She lived permanently in the Moscow hotel "Lux", where she suffered from depression because of the constant travels of her husband and the inability to have children. In 1927, already mentally ill, she was placed in a special sanatorium near the Soviet capital. The arrest of Dimitrov in 1933 in Germany on a charge of inciting the Reichstag fire exacerbated her condition. On 27 May 1933, she committed suicide by jumping from the third floor of the hotel while her husband was in prison in Berlin.

Ljubica Ivošević Dimitrov is considered to be the first Serbian proletarian female poet. She published 25 poems in various Serbian journals and magazines (between 1902 and 1923), as well as two prose pieces in Bulgaria (in 1920 and 1922).
