= Bled agreement (1947) =

1947 treaty between Yugoslavia and Bulgaria

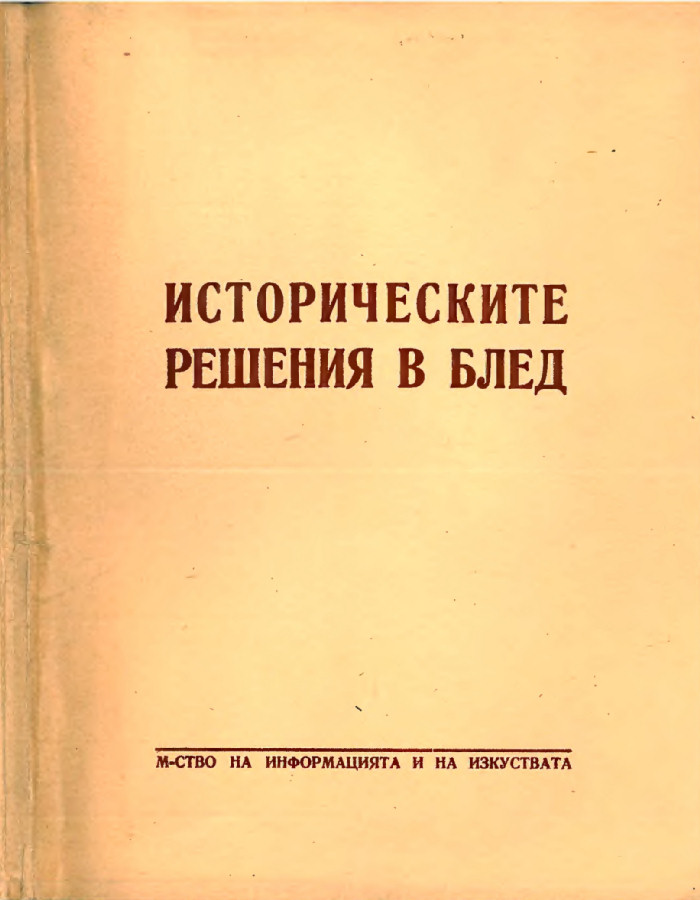
"Историческите решения в Блед" (transl. The historical decisions in Bled), Sofia, 1947

The Bled agreement (also referred to as the "Tito–Dimitrov treaty") was signed on 1 August 1947 by Georgi Dimitrov and Josip Broz Tito in Bled, PR Slovenia, FPR Yugoslavia, and paved the way for a future unification of Bulgaria and FPR Yugoslavia in a new Balkan Federation. It also foresaw the unification of Vardar Macedonia and Pirin Macedonia and the return of Western Outlands to Bulgaria. The agreement abolished visas and allowed for a customs union.

== History ==
In late July to early August 1947, in Bled, PR Slovenia, Bulgarian leader Georgi Dimitrov and Yugoslav leader Josip Broz Tito (in the presence of the Yugoslav Macedonian prime minister Lazar Koliševski), agreed on political relations and economic cooperation between PR Bulgaria and FPR Yugoslavia. A plan for the unification of Pirin Macedonia with the People's Republic of Macedonia was also made. However, the Bulgarian position was the unification would be achieved only with a future union agreement between Yugoslavia and Bulgaria (where both countries would have equal political status), along with the return of the Western Outlands to Bulgaria. The Yugoslav authorities proposed including Bulgaria in Yugoslavia as its seventh republic. Bulgaria's sovereignty over the Pirin region was guaranteed then, with interference by the Yugoslav Macedonian authorities being rejected by the Bulgarian authorities. Bulgaria was obliged to introduce Macedonian cultural institutions in Pirin and to organize education in Macedonian language and history.

The agreement envisioned the abolishment of entry visas and the establishment of a customs union, the abolishment of significant war reparations from Bulgaria to Yugoslavia, and granting cultural autonomy for Pirin Macedonia. Soviet Union leader Joseph Stalin was not pleased that the Yugoslavs and Bulgarians signed the agreement without Soviet consultation. Both the Yugoslav and the Bulgarian leadership were scolded by the Soviet Union. Stalin wrote to Tito and Dimitrov:

"The opinion of the Soviet government is that both governments have made a mistake, having made a treaty, moreover, of unlimited duration, The Soviet government believes that the impatience of these two governments has facilitated the actions of reactionary Anglo-American elements, giving them an additional excuse to intensify the military intervention in Greek and Turkish affairs against Yugoslavia and Bulgaria... The Soviet government must be given advance notice, as it cannot take responsibility for agreements of great importance in the area of foreign policy that are signed without consultation with the Soviet government."

According to Viktor Meier, Dimitrov agreed to the creation of a "Greater Macedonia" because he expected that "two Bulgarian states" would be represented in the Balkan Federation. Bulgaria and Yugoslavia worked on the creation of a Greater Macedonia as Bulgaria believed that it would be part of a future Balkan Federation. While there was initial tolerance for this project, the Bulgarian authorities were alarmed when the Yugoslav authorities sent Yugoslav Macedonian teachers to teach Macedonian at Pirin Macedonia and due to the preparation by the Yugoslavs to unite Pirin Macedonia with Yugoslav Macedonia. The policies resulting from the agreement were reversed after the Tito–Stalin split in June 1948, when Bulgaria, not wanting to be a seventh republic of Yugoslavia as Tito imagined and being tied to the interests of the Soviet Union, took a stance against Yugoslavia. The Bulgarian authorities condemned the Yugoslav policy as expansionist. After 1948, cultural cooperation between Yugoslavia and Bulgaria stopped. When the Cominform campaign against Yugoslavia severed the Yugoslav Communist Party leadership, the government of Bulgaria on 1 October 1949 deleted the Treaty on Friendship, Cooperation and Mutual Assistance of Bled with all its agreements.

== See also ==
- Bulgaria–Yugoslavia relations
