= Georgi Dimitrov High School =

Georgi Dimitrov Георги Димитров
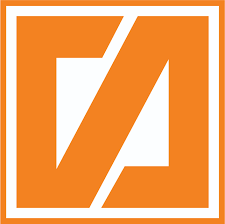

Location
- Ul. Varšavska 3 North Macedonia

Information
- Type: High school
- Established: 1964
- Principal: Saša Stoimenov
- Staff: 79 teachers
- Website: www.georgidimitrov.edu.mk

Georgi Dimitrov (Macedonian: Георги Димитров), officially HSCS (High School of City Skopje) Georgi Dimitrov (Macedonian: СУГС (Средно Училиште на Град Скопје) Георги Димитров) is a High School located in Skopje, North Macedonia. It is named after the former Bulgarian Prime Minister Georgi Dimitrov.

== History ==
The school was built in 1964 after the catastrophic earthquake that hit Skopje in 1963, as aid from the Bulgarian Government. High school students were educated in it until 1984, when the reforms in education began. In 1989, the school functioned as a part of DSU "Zdravko Cvetkovski" as a school center, and it houses students from the woodworking profession. In 1989, the woodworking profession was separated as a separate school under the name "Georgi Dimitrov". In 1998, high school education was re-introduced, and in 2000, a forestry profession.

== Specialized German Program ==
In cooperation with the Center for the Study of the German Language Abroad (ZfA) since 2008, the specialized program in German language with 6 hours of weekly fund began to be realized in HSCS "Georgi Dimitrov". The main goal of this program is the development of students' language competences, the practice of modern methods and techniques of teaching a foreign language, the possibility of obtaining a language certificate, as well as the establishment of international partnerships through school programs and projects. Within the framework of the school's activities, students participate in various projects, win many prizes and scholarships and acquire language diplomas.

== Notable alumni ==
- Branko Crvenkovski – former President
- Vlatko Stefanovski – famous Macedonian Guitarist
- Vasil Tupurkovski – professor and politician
- Vilma Trajkovska – former First Lady of the Republic of North Macedonia
- Igor Džambazov – artist, showman, radio, TV host and musician
- Vladimir Petrovic- actor
