= Georgi Dimitrov =

Leader of Bulgaria from 1946 to 1949

- Георги Димитров Михайлов
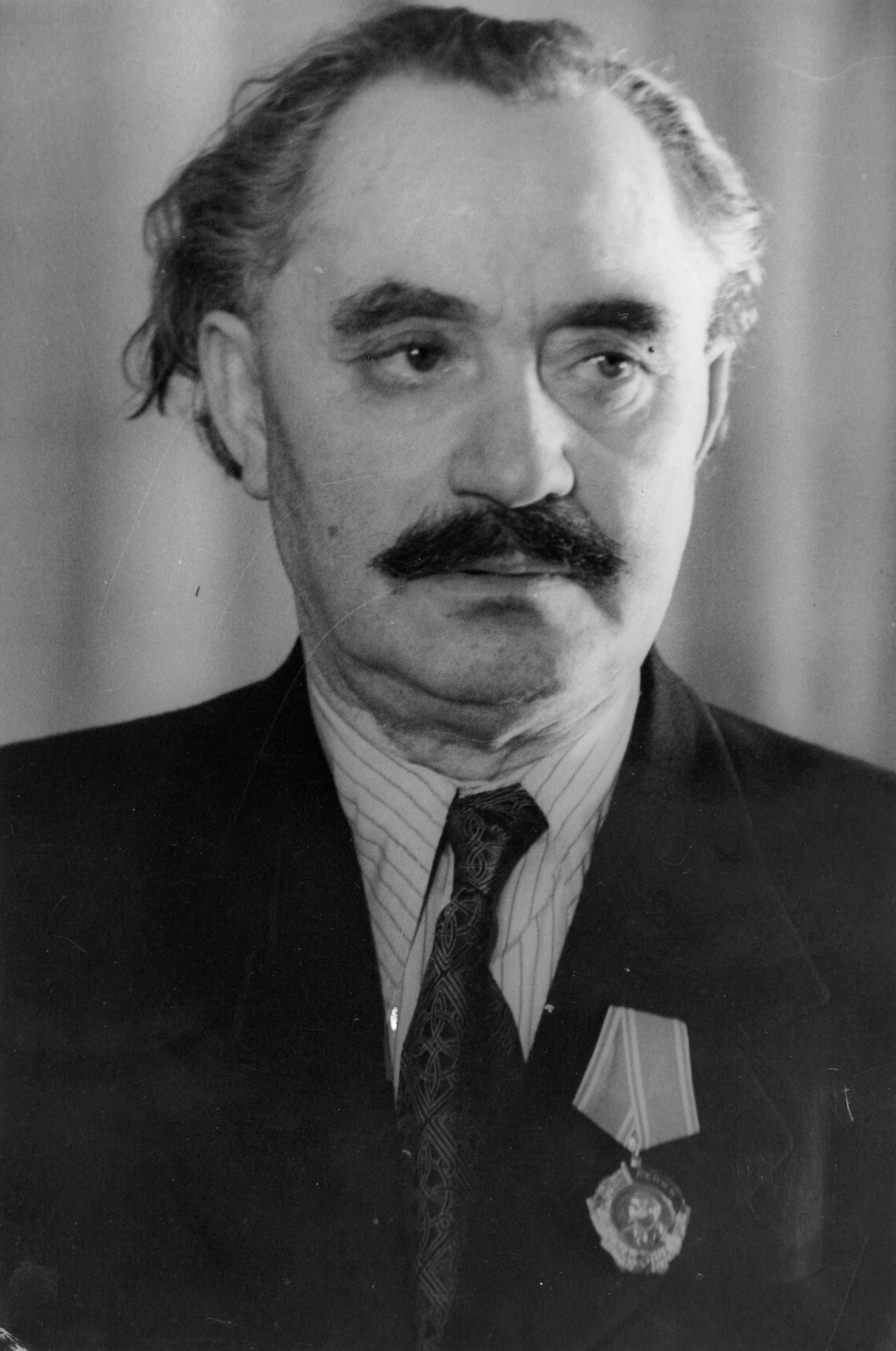
- Dimitrov in 1947, with the Order of Lenin

General Secretary of the Bulgarian Communist Party (Note: Titled "Chairman" until 27 December 1948.)
- In office 1933 – 2 July 1949
- Preceded by: Vasil Kolarov
- Succeeded by: Valko Chervenkov

Chairman of the Council of Ministers of Bulgaria (Note: 32nd Prime Minister of Bulgaria.)
- In office 23 November 1946 – 2 July 1949
- Preceded by: Kimon Georgiev
- Succeeded by: Vasil Kolarov

Head of the International Policy Department of the CPSU
- In office 27 December 1943 – 29 December 1945
- Preceded by: Position established
- Succeeded by: Mikhail Suslov

General Secretary of the Executive Committee of the Communist International
- In office 25 July 1935 – 15 May 1943
- Preceded by: Vyacheslav Molotov
- Succeeded by: Office abolished

Personal details
- Born: Georgi Dimitrov Mihaylov; 18 June 1882 Kovachevtsi, Bulgaria
- Died: 2 July 1949 (aged 67) Barvikha, Moscow Oblast, Soviet Union
- Party: BCP
- Other political affiliations: BRSDP (1902–1903); BSDWP-Narrow Socialists (1903–1919)
- Spouse(s): Ljubica Ivošević (m. 1906; died 1933) Roza Yulievna Fleishmann (m. 1934; died 1949)
- Children: 3
- Profession: Politician; Revolutionary; Typesetter
- De facto leader of the PRB: ← (First in role); Kolarov →

Georgi Dimitrov Mihaylov, (Note: /dɪˈmiːtrɒf/; Bulgarian: Георги Димитров Михайлов) also known as Georgiy Mihaylovich Dimitrov (Note: Russian: Георгий Михайлович Димитров) (18 June 1882 – 2 July 1949), was a Bulgarian communist politician and revolutionary who served as General Secretary of the Central Committee of the Bulgarian Communist Party from 1933 to 1949, and the first leader of the Communist People's Republic of Bulgaria from 1946 to 1949. From 1935 to 1943, he was the General Secretary of the Communist International.

Born in western Bulgaria, Dimitrov worked as a printer and trade unionist during his youth. He was elected to the Bulgarian parliament as a socialist during the First World War and campaigned against his country's involvement in the conflict, which led to his brief imprisonment for sedition. In 1919, he helped found the Bulgarian Communist Party. Two years later, he moved to Soviet Russia and was elected to the executive committee of Profintern. In 1923, Dimitrov led a failed communist uprising against the government of Aleksandar Tsankov and was subsequently forced into exile. He lived in the Soviet Union until 1929, at which time he relocated to Germany and became head of the Comintern operations in central Europe.

Dimitrov rose to international prominence in the aftermath of the 1933 Reichstag fire trial. Accused of plotting the arson, he refused counsel and mounted an eloquent defence against his Nazi accusers, in particular Hermann Göring, ultimately winning acquittal. After the trial, he relocated to Moscow and was elected head of Comintern.

In 1946, Dimitrov returned to Bulgaria after 22 years in exile and was elected prime minister of the newly founded People's Republic of Bulgaria. He negotiated with Josip Broz Tito to create a federation of Southern Slavs, which led to the 1947 Bled accord. The plan ultimately fell apart over differences regarding the future of the joint country as well as the Macedonian question, and was completely abandoned following the fallout between Stalin and Tito. Dimitrov died after a short illness in 1949 in Barvikha near Moscow. His embalmed body was housed in the Georgi Dimitrov Mausoleum in Sofia until its removal in 1990; the mausoleum was demolished in 1999.

== Early life ==
The first of eight children, Dimitrov was born in Kovachevtsi, in present-day Pernik Province, to refugee parents from Ottoman Macedonia (a mother from Bansko and a father from Razlog). His father was a rural craftsman, forced by industrialisation to become a factory worker. His mother, Parashkeva Doseva, was a Protestant Christian, and his family is sometimes described as Protestant. The family moved to Radomir and then to Sofia. Several of Georgi's siblings engaged in leftist political activities. His brother Nikola moved to Russia and joined the Bolsheviks in Odessa. In 1908, Nikola was arrested and exiled to Siberia where he died in 1916. Georgi's brother Konstantin became a trade union leader but was killed in the First Balkan War in 1912. One of his sisters, Lena, married a future communist leader, Valko Chervenkov.

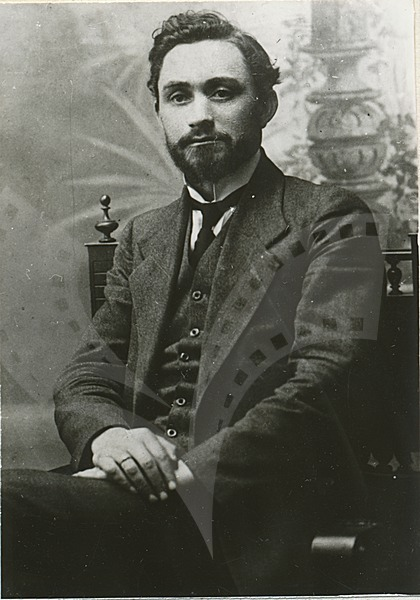
Portrait of a young Dimitrov in 1911

Dimitrov was sent to Sunday school by his mother, who wanted him to be a pastor, but he was expelled at age 12. He then trained as a compositor, and became active in the labor movement in the Bulgarian capital. By age 15, he was an active trade union member. By age 18 in 1900, he was secretary of the Sofia branch of the printers' union.

== Career ==
Dimitrov joined the Bulgarian Social Democratic Workers' Party in 1902. The following year he allied himself with Dimitar Blagoev and the faction that formed the Social Democratic Labour Party of Bulgaria ("The Narrow Party", or tesniaks). In 1919, this party became the Bulgarian Communist Party when it affiliated with Bolshevism and the Comintern. From 1904 to 1923, Dimitrov was Secretary of the General Trade Unions Federation, which the Narrows controlled.

In 1911, he spent a month in prison for libeling an official of the rival Free Federation of Trade Unions, whom he accused of strike-breaking. In 1913, he was elected to the Bulgarian Parliament. He opposed government policies in the Balkan Wars and World War I. In 1915, he voted against awarding new war credits and denounced Bulgarian nationalism, for which he received short prison sentences. In summer 1917, after he intervened in defense of wounded soldiers who were being ordered by an officer to clear out of a first-class railway carriage, Dimitrov was charged with incitement to mutiny, stripped of his parliamentary immunity, and imprisoned on 29 August 1918. Released in 1919, he went underground and made two failed attempts to visit Russia, finally reaching Moscow in February 1921. He returned to Bulgaria later in 1921, but then travelled again to Moscow and was elected in December 1922 to the Executive Bureau of Profintern, the communist trade union international.

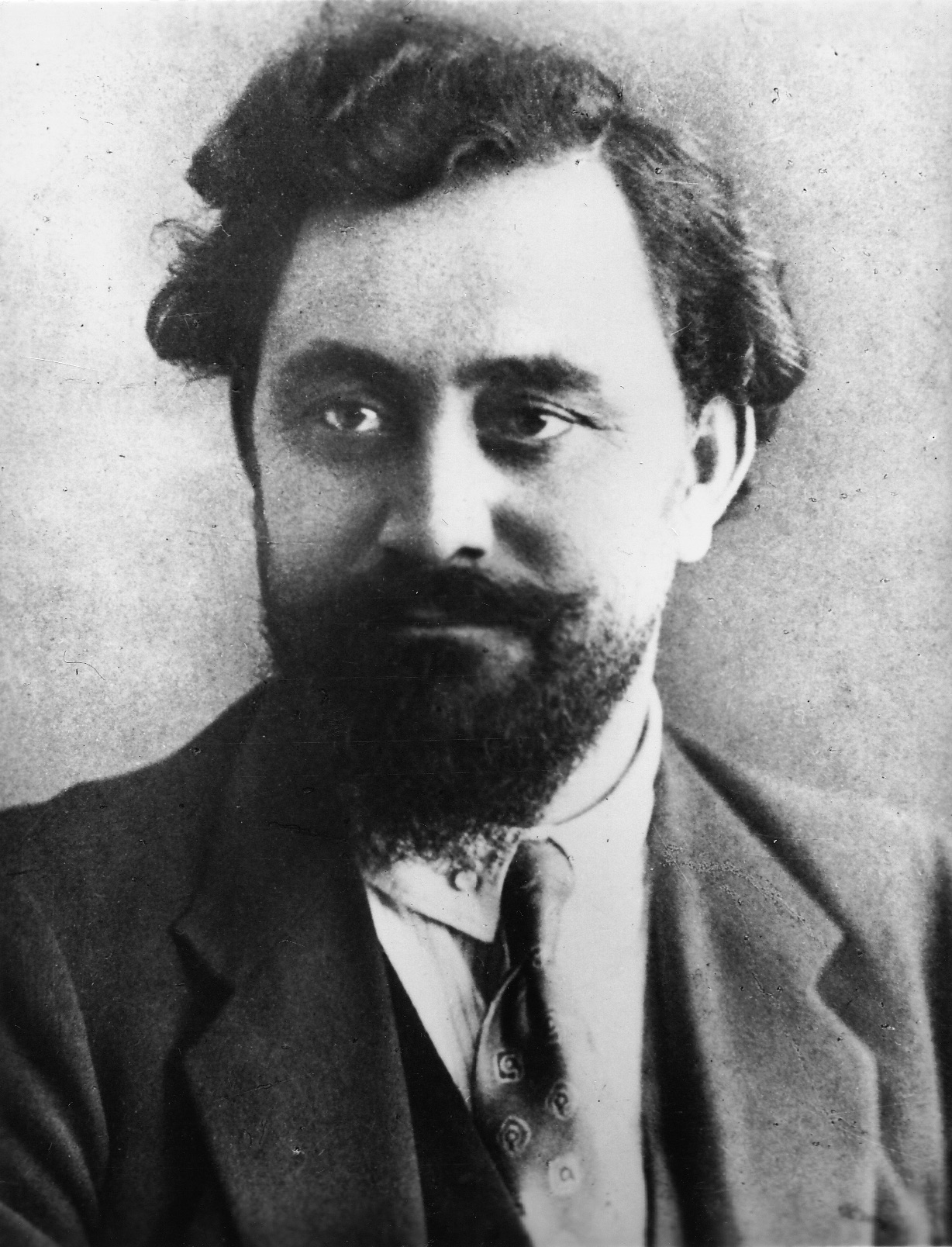
Dimitrov in 1923

In June 1923, when Bulgarian Prime Minister Aleksandar Stamboliyski was deposed through a coup d'état, Dimitrov and Khristo Kabakchiev, the leading communists in Bulgaria at the time, resolved not to take sides, a decision condemned by the Comintern as a "political capitulation" brought on by the party's "dogmatic-doctrinaire approach". After Vasil Kolarov had been sent from Moscow to impose a change in the Bulgarian party line, Dimitrov accepted the Comintern's authority. In September 1923, he and Kolarov led the failed uprising against the regime of Aleksandar Tsankov, which cost the lives of possibly five thousand communist supporters during the fighting and the reprisals which followed. Despite its failure, the attempt was approved by the Comintern, and secured the positions of Kolarov and Dimitrov – who escaped via Yugoslavia to Vienna – as the joint leaders of the Bulgarian CP.

The political struggle in Bulgaria intensified in 1925. Dimitrov's only surviving brother, Todor, was arrested and killed that year by royal police. After the April 1925 St Nedelya Church assault, which was a terrorist bomb attack carried out by members of the Bulgarian CP, Dimitrov was tried in absentia in May 1926 and sentenced to death, although he had not approved the attack. Living under pseudonyms, he remained in the Soviet Union until 1929, when he was ousted from his Bulgarian CP leadership role by a faction of younger, more left-wing activists. Dimitrov then relocated to Germany where he was given charge of the Central European section of the Comintern. In 1932, he was appointed Secretary General of the World Committee Against War and Fascism, replacing Willi Münzenberg.

== Leipzig trial ==
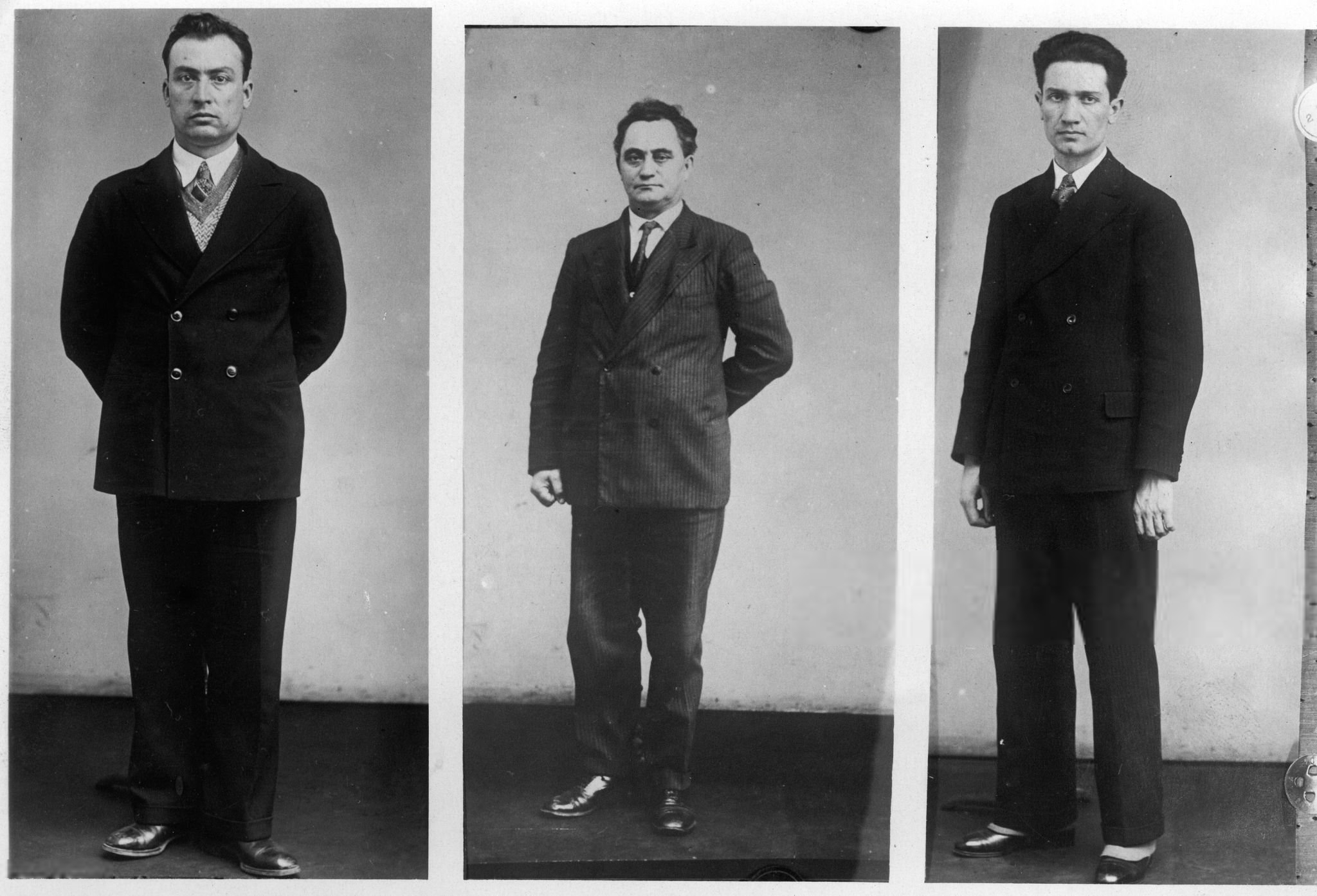
Dimitrov (center) with fellow Bulgarian communists Vasil Tanev (left) and Blagoy Popov (right) shortly after their arrest, 1933

Dimitrov was living in Berlin in early 1933 when Adolf Hitler and the Nazis took power. On the night of 27 February, the German parliament building, the Reichstag, was severely damaged in an arson attack. A Dutch communist, Marinus van der Lubbe, was found near the scene of the crime and presumed to be the culprit. Hitler quickly blamed a Communist conspiracy for the arson, and the Nazis proceeded to make mass arrests. On 9 March, Dimitrov was arrested based on the evidence of a waiter who claimed to have seen "three Russians" (in reality, Dimitrov and two other Bulgarians, Vasil Tanev, and Blagoy Popov, both of whom were members of the faction that had supplanted Dimitrov in the Bulgarian Communist Party) talking in a cafe with Van der Lubbe. Dimitrov would remain in Nazi detention until the following February. His diary entries during this period tended to be "dry and elliptical, and occasionally obscure" since he knew they would be subject to examination by his captors.

The Reichstag fire trial lasted from September to December 1933. Because it occurred at the Reich Supreme Court in Leipzig, it is often referred to as the Leipzig Trial. Dimitrov decided to refuse counsel and defend himself against his Nazi accusers, most famously Hermann Göring. Dimitrov used the trial as an opportunity to defend the Communist ideology. Explaining why he chose to speak in his own defense, Dimitrov said:

I admit that my tone is hard and grim. The struggle of my life has always been hard and grim. My tone is frank and open. I am used to calling a spade a spade. I am no lawyer appearing before this court in the mere way of his profession. I am defending myself, an accused Communist. I am defending my political honor, my honor as a revolutionary. I am defending my Communist ideology, my ideals. I am defending the content and significance of my whole life. For these reasons every word which I say in this court is a part of me, each phrase is the expression of my deep indignation against the unjust accusation, against the putting of this anti-Communist crime, the burning of the Reichstag, to the account of the Communists.

Dimitrov's calm conduct of his defence, and the accusations he directed at his prosecutors, won him world renown. In Europe, a popular saying spread across the Continent: "There is only one brave man in Germany, and he is a Bulgarian." Among those impressed with Dimitrov was the noted U.S. attorney Arthur Garfield Hays, co-founder of the American Civil Liberties Union. Hays attended the Leipzig Trial and devoted a chapter to it in his 1942 autobiography. In an oft-quoted passage, Hays wrote of Dimitrov:

I have never seen such a magnificent exhibition of moral courage. The man was not only brave but reckless, and selflessly so. Whenever he got to his feet, he would by force of his personality place the court, the prosecutors, the German audience, and the Nazis on the defensive.

This striking characterization was cited in multiple American newspaper reviews of Hays' book and helped introduce Dimitrov's name throughout the U.S.

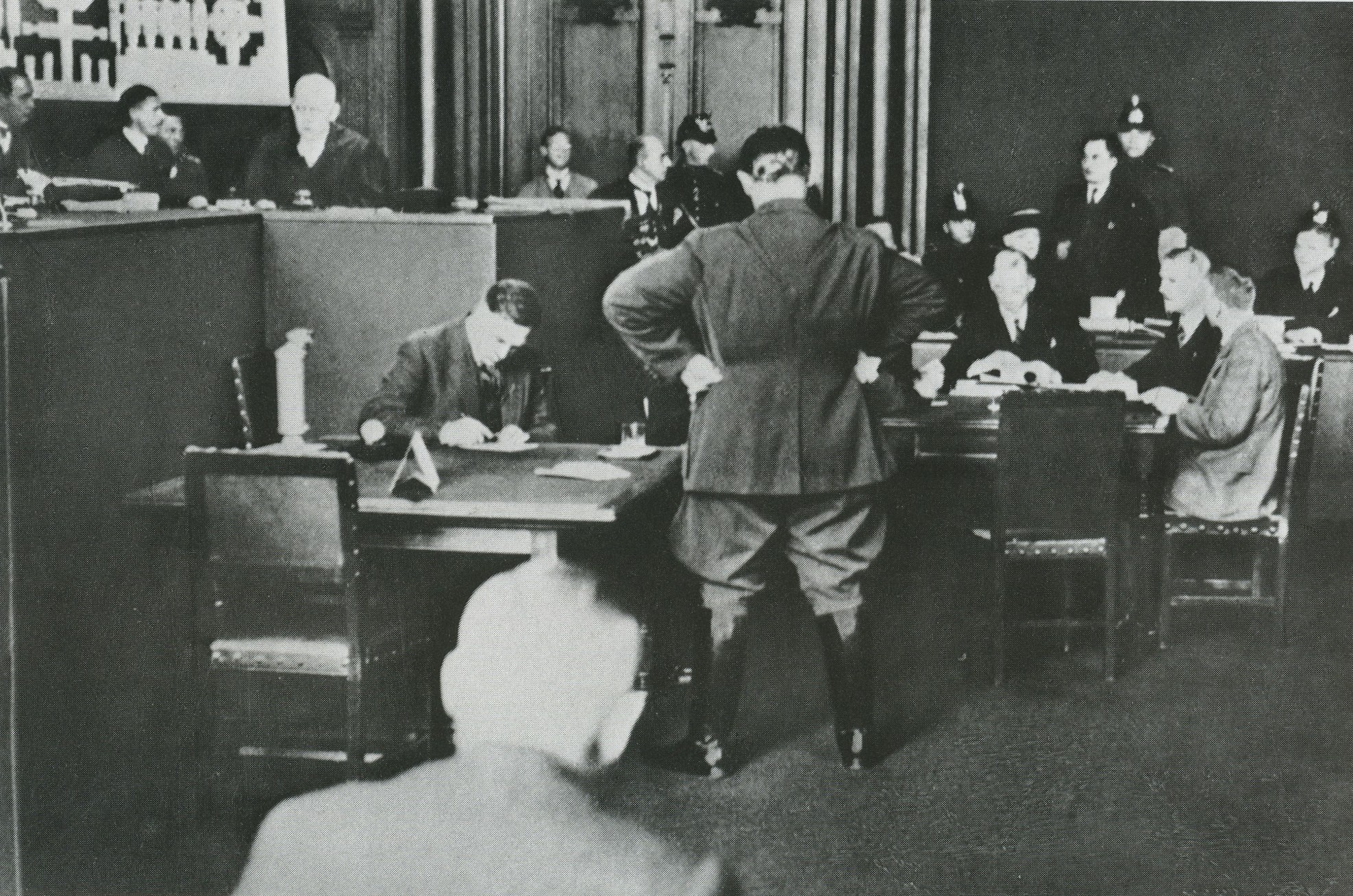
Dimitrov (standing in the background to the right) giving a speech in the trial of the Reichstag fire, 1933

On 23 December 1933, the verdicts were read. While Van der Lubbe was found guilty and sentenced to death, the judge acquitted Dimitrov, Tanev, and Popov because of insufficient evidence to connect them to what the judge was convinced was a conspiracy to burn down the Reichstag. The three Bulgarians were expelled from Germany and sent to the USSR.

== Head of Comintern ==
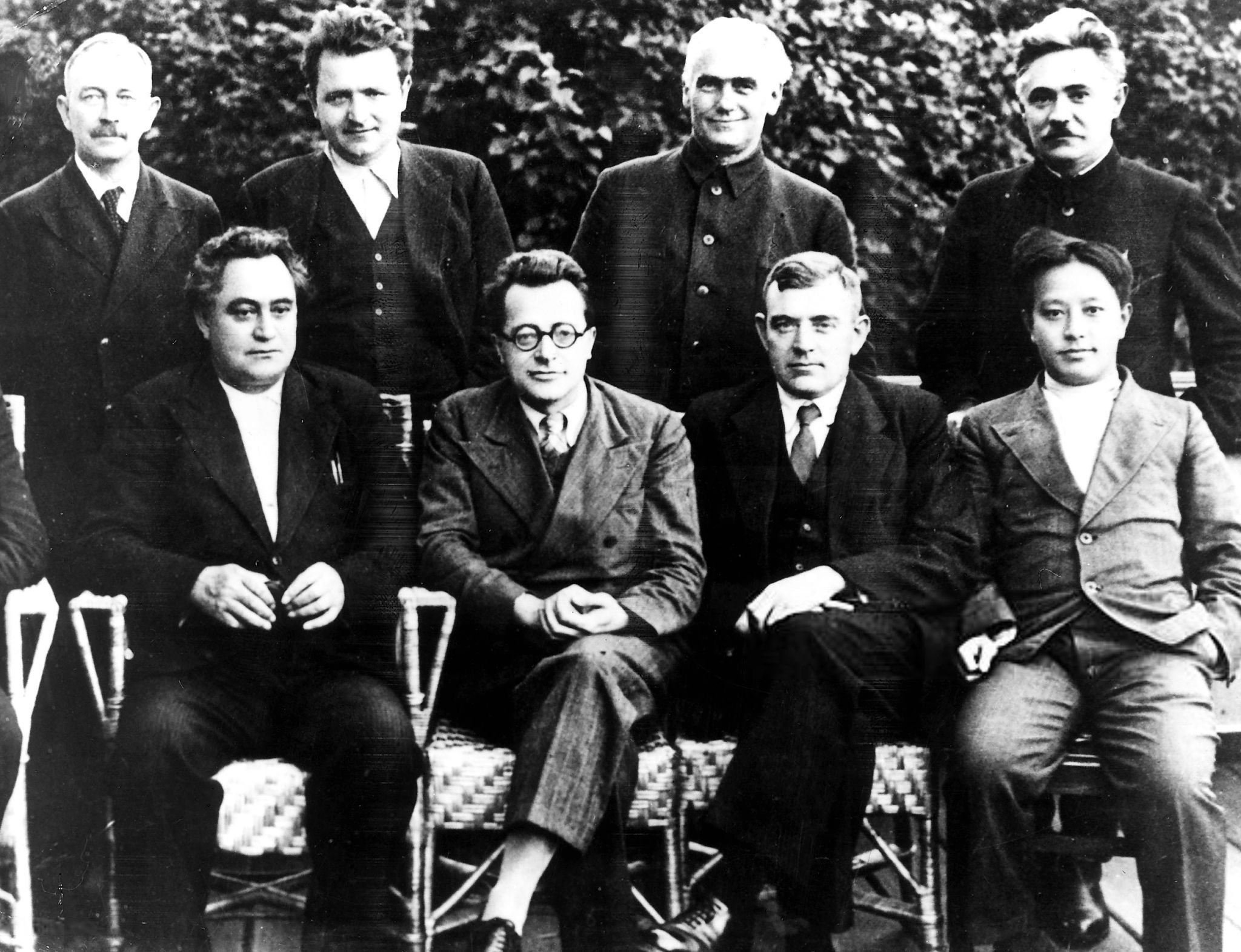
Members of the Executive Committee of the Comintern at the 7th World Congress, 1935. Seated (L-R): Georgi Dimitrov, Palmiro Togliatti, Wilhelm Florin, Wang Ming. Standing: Otto Kuusinen, Dmitry Manuilsky, Klement Gottwald, Wilhelm Pieck.

When Dimitrov arrived in Moscow on 28 February 1934, he was encouraged by Joseph Stalin to end the practice of denouncing Social Democrats as 'social fascists', practically indistinguishable from actual fascists, and to instead promote "united front" tactics against the threat of European fascism. In April, as Dimitrov's fame grew in the wake of the Leipzig Trial, he was appointed a member of the Executive of Comintern and of its political secretariat, in charge of the Anglo-American and Central European sections. He was being groomed to take control of the Comintern from two of the so-called "Old Bolsheviks", Iosif Pyatnitsky and Wilhelm Knorin, who had held the position since 1923. Finally, in 1934, Stalin chose Dimitrov to head the international organization. At this point, Tzvetan Todorov writes, Dimitrov "became part of the Soviet leader's inner circle."

From 25 July to 20 August 1935, the 7th World Congress of the Communist International met in Moscow. Dimitrov was the dominant presence; he was elected the Comintern's General Secretary. His impassioned anti-fascist speeches at the Congress were transcribed and published in a September 1935 pamphlet, The United Front Against Fascism, which went through numerous editions over the ensuing years.

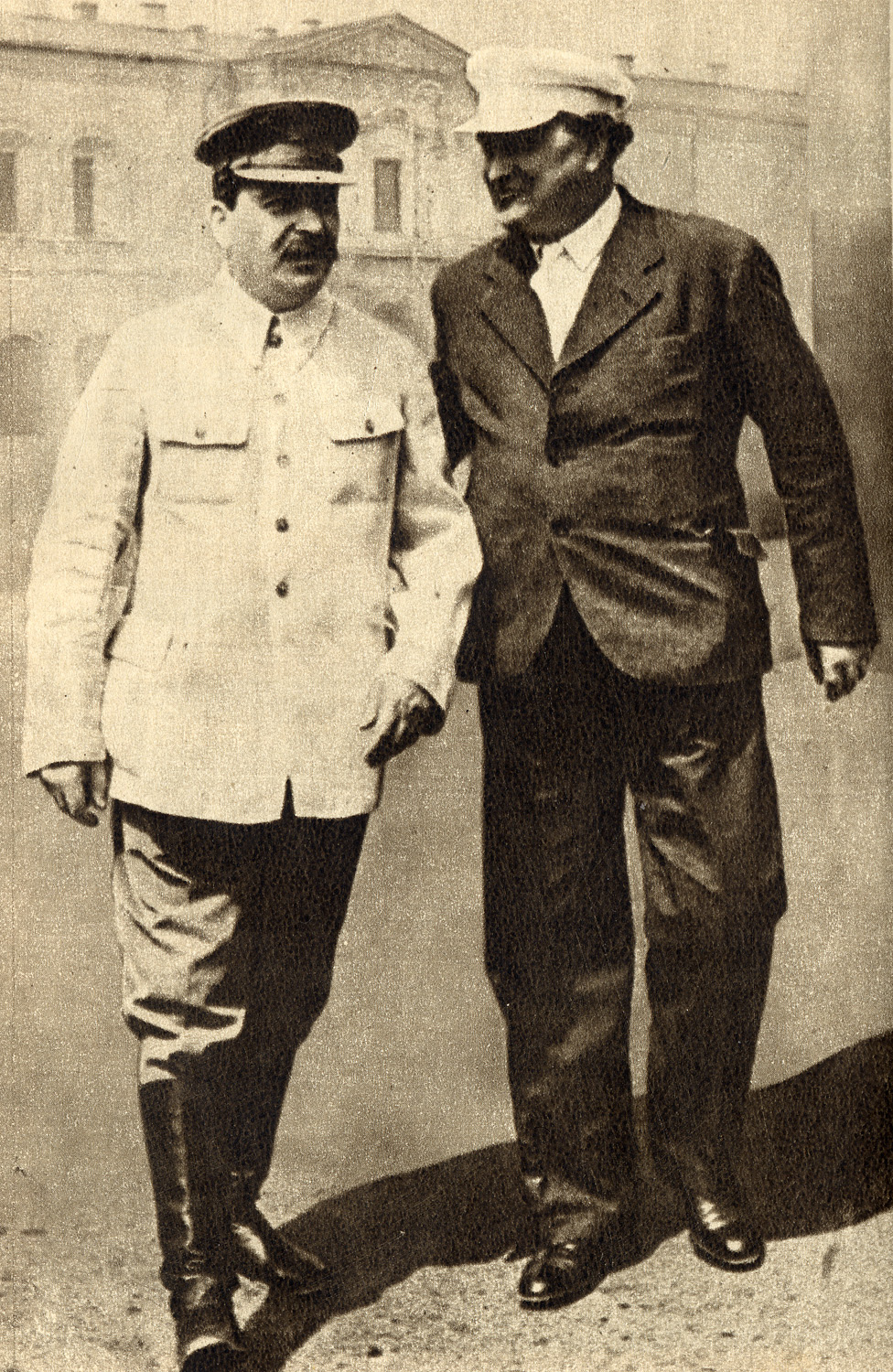
Joseph Stalin and Dimitrov in Moscow, 1936

During the Great Purge in the Soviet Union, Dimitrov knew about the mass arrests, but did almost nothing. In November 1937, he was told by Stalin to lure the German communist Willi Münzenberg to the USSR so that he could be arrested. Dimitrov did not object and did as he was told. He noted in his diary when Julian Leszczyński, Henryk Walecki, and several members of his staff were arrested, but again did nothing, though he did raise questions when the NKVD representative in Comintern, Mikhail Trilisser, was arrested.

== Leader of Bulgaria ==
In 1946, Dimitrov returned to Bulgaria after 22 years in exile. After a referendum abolished the monarchy in September, Bulgaria was declared a people's republic. Later that year, he succeeded Kimon Georgiev as Prime Minister, though Dimitrov had already been the most powerful man in the country since the monarchy was abolished two months earlier. He retained his Soviet citizenship.

One of Dimitrov's first acts as Prime Minister was to negotiate with Josip Broz Tito on the creation of a Federation of the Southern Slavs. The Bulgarian and Yugoslav Communist leaderships had been discussing this matter since November 1944. The idea was based on the fact that Yugoslavia and Bulgaria were the only two homelands of the Southern Slavs, and were separated from the rest of the Slavic world. The idea eventually resulted in the 1947 Bled accord, signed by Dimitrov and Tito, which called for abandoning frontier travel barriers, arranging for a future customs union, and having Yugoslavia unilaterally forgive Bulgarian war reparations. The preliminary plan for the federation included the incorporation of the Blagoevgrad Region ("Pirin Macedonia") into the People's Republic of Macedonia and the return of the Western Outlands from Serbia to Bulgaria. In anticipation of this, Bulgaria accepted teachers from Yugoslavia who started to teach the newly codified Macedonian language in the schools in Pirin Macedonia, and also issued an order that the Bulgarians of the Blagoevgrad Region should claim а Macedonian identity.

However, differences soon emerged between Dimitrov and Tito with regard to both the future joint country and the Macedonian question. Whereas Dimitrov envisaged a state where Yugoslavia and Bulgaria would be placed on an equal footing and Macedonia would be more or less attached to Bulgaria, Tito saw Bulgaria as a seventh republic in an enlarged Yugoslavia tightly ruled from Belgrade. Their differences also extended to the national character of the Macedonians; whereas Dimitrov considered them to be an offshoot of the Bulgarians, Tito regarded them as an independent nation of people who had nothing whatsoever to do with the Bulgarians. The initial tolerance for the Macedonization of Pirin Macedonia gradually grew into outright alarm.

By January 1948, Tito's plans to annex Bulgaria and Albania had become an obstacle to policy of the Cominform and the other Eastern Bloc countries. In December 1947, Enver Hoxha and an Albanian delegation were invited to a high-level meeting in Bulgaria. Dimitrov was aware of the subversive activity of Koçi Xoxe and other pro-Yugoslav Albanian officials. He told Enver Hoxha during the meeting: "Look here, Comrade Enver, keep the Party pure! Let it be revolutionary, proletarian and everything will go well with you!"

After the initial rupture, Stalin invited Dimitrov and Tito to Moscow regarding the recent incident. Dimitrov accepted the invitation, but Tito refused, and sent his close associate Edvard Kardelj instead. The resulting rift between Stalin and Tito in 1948 gave the Bulgarian Government an eagerly-awaited opportunity of denouncing Yugoslav policy in Macedonia as expansionistic, and of revising its policy on the Macedonian question. The ideas of a Balkan Federation and a United Macedonia were abandoned, the Macedonian teachers were expelled and the teaching of Macedonian throughout the province was discontinued. At the 5th Congress of the Bulgarian Workers' Party (Communists), Dimitrov accused Tito of "nationalism" and hostility towards the internationalist communists, specifically the Soviet Union. Despite the fallout, Yugoslavia did not reverse its position on renouncing Bulgarian war reparations, as defined in the 1947 Bled accord.

== Personal life ==
In 1906, Dimitrov married his first wife, Serbian emigrant milliner, writer and socialist Ljubica Ivošević, with whom he lived until her death in 1933. While in the Soviet Union, Dimitrov married his second wife, the Czech-born Roza Yulievna Fleishmann (1896–1958), who gave birth to his only son, Mitya, in 1936. The boy died at age seven of diphtheria. While Mitya was alive, Dimitrov adopted Fani, a daughter of Wang Ming, the acting General Secretary of the Chinese Communist Party in 1931. He and his wife adopted another child, Boiko Dimitrov, born 1941.

== Death ==
Dimitrov died on 2 July 1949 in the Barvikha sanatorium near Moscow. The speculation that he had been poisoned has never been confirmed, although his health seemed to deteriorate quite abruptly. The supporters of the poisoning theory claim that Stalin did not like the "Balkan Federation" idea of Dimitrov and his closeness with Tito.

After the funeral, Dimitrov's body was embalmed and placed on display in Sofia's Georgi Dimitrov Mausoleum. After the end of Communist rule in Bulgaria, his body was buried in Sofia's central cemetery in 1990. His mausoleum was demolished in 1999.

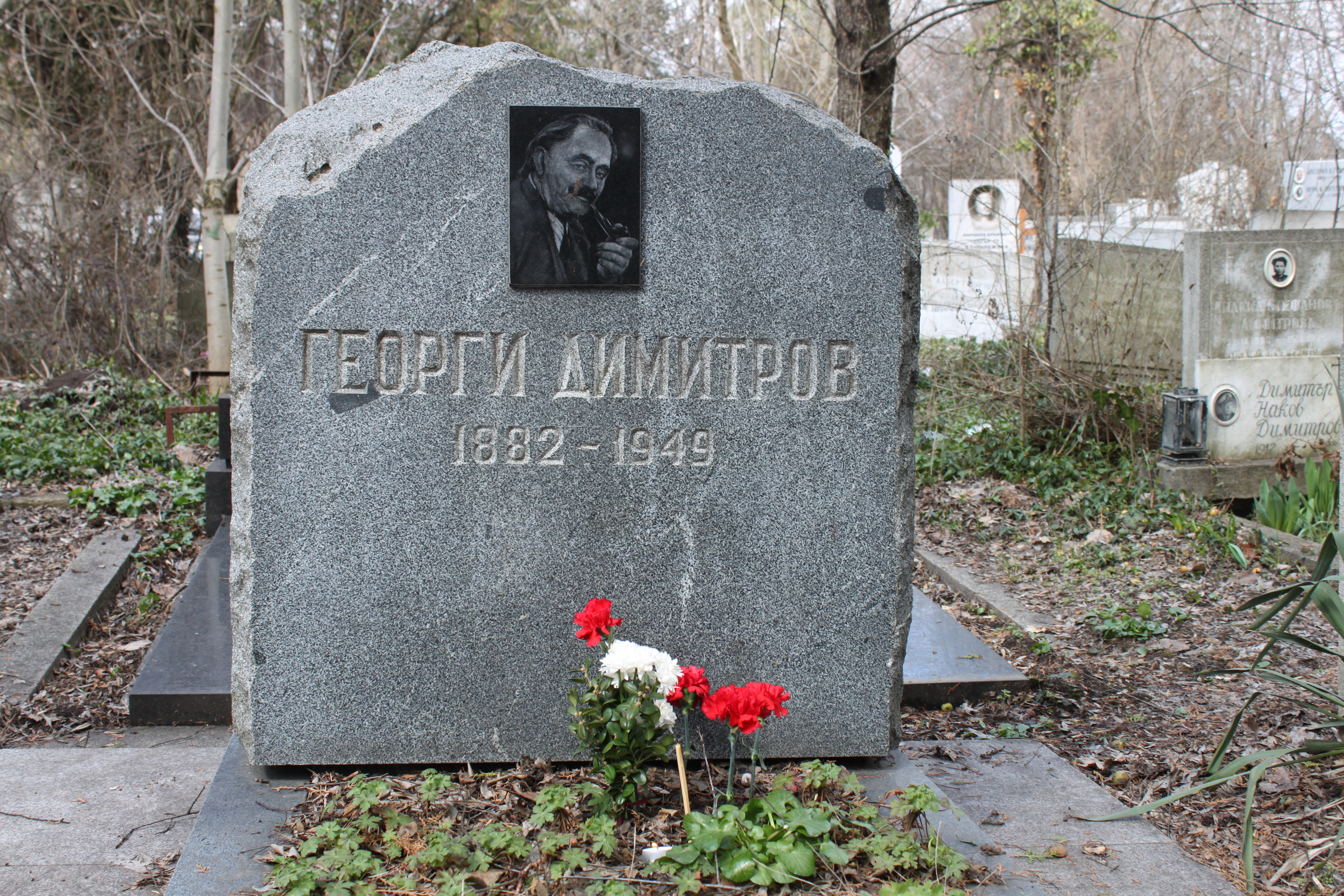
Dimitrov's grave in Sofia

== Legacy ==
=== Armenia ===
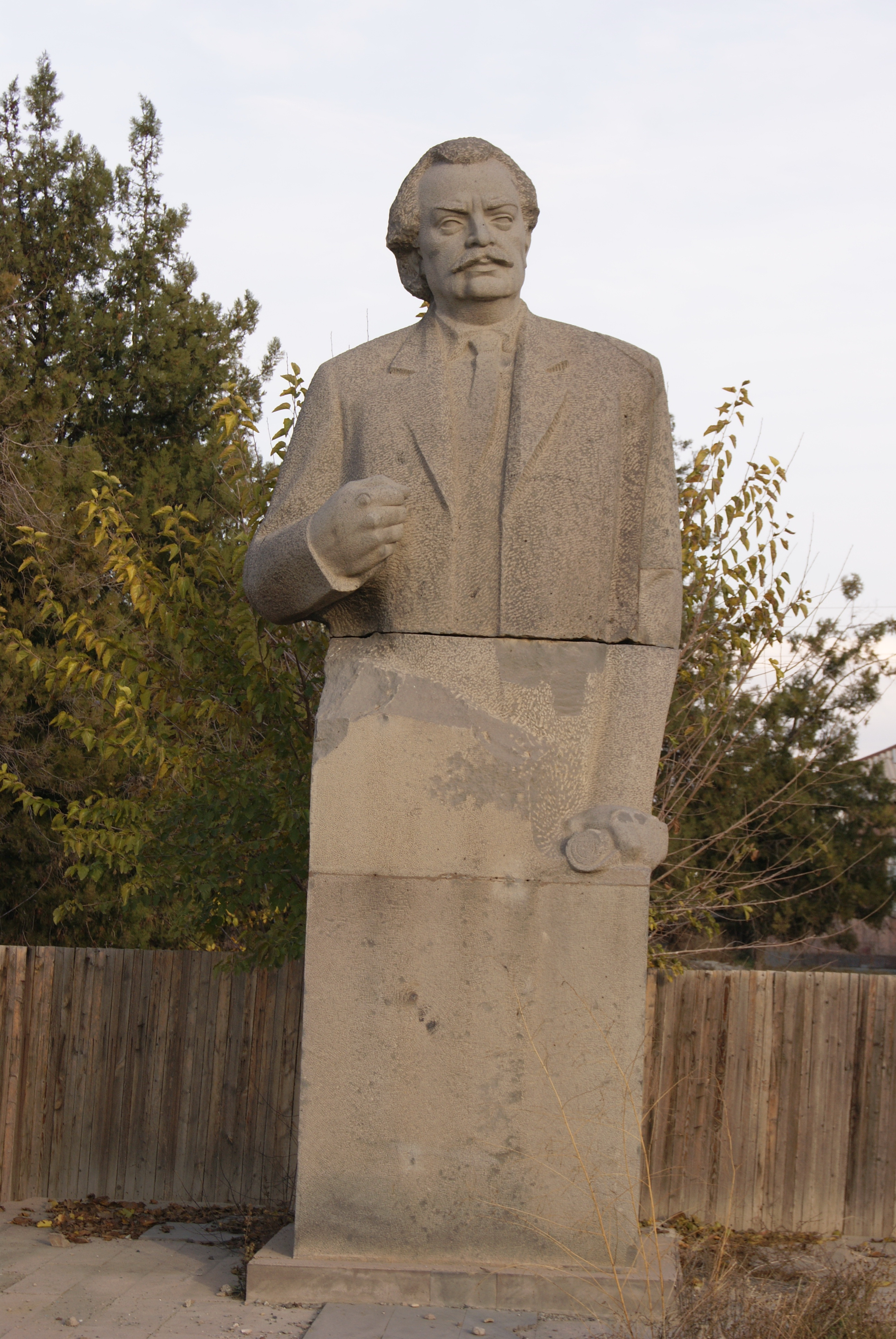
Statue of Dimitrov in Armenia

- A statue in the village of Dimitrov, named in his honour in 1949.

=== Benin ===
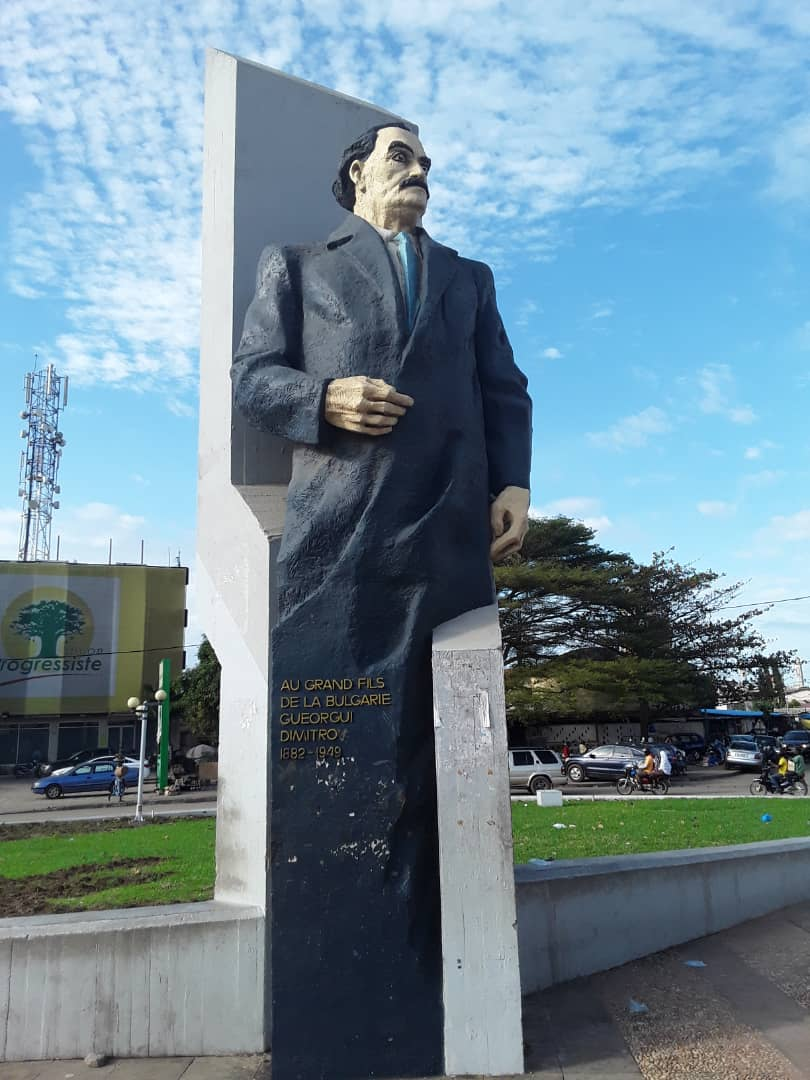
Statue of Georgi Dimitrov in Cotonou, Benin

- A large painted statue of Dimitrov survives in the centre of Place Bulgarie in Cotonou, Republic of Benin, decades after the country abandoned Marxism–Leninism and the colossal statue of Vladimir Lenin was removed from Place Lenine.

=== Bulgaria ===
- Dimitrovgrad, Bulgaria
- Georgi Dimitrov Mausoleum 1949–1999

=== Cambodia ===
- There is also an avenue (#114) named for him in Phnom Penh, Cambodia.

=== Cuba ===
- A main avenue in the Nuevo Holguin neighborhood, which was built during the 1970s and 1980s in the city of Holguín is named after him.
- Instituto de Investigaciones Agropecuarias Jorge Dimitrov in Bayamo is named after him.
- IPUEC Jorge Dimitrov (Ceiba 7) school in Caimito
- Primary School Escuela Primaria Jorge Dimitrov in Havana

=== East Germany ===
- In then-East Berlin's Pankow district, a street that since 1874 had been named Danziger Straße — after the formerly German city Danzig (now Gdańsk, Poland) — was in 1950 renamed Dimitroffstraße (Dimitrov Street) by the Communist East German regime. It also lent its name to an U-Bahn station. After German unification, the Berlin Senate in 1995 restored the street's name to Danziger Straße, and the U-Bahn station was renamed Eberswalder Straße.

=== England ===
- In July 1982, there was a centennial celebration of Dimitrov's birth held at Mahatma Gandhi Hall in London. A lecture from the event was printed in the pamphlet, Georgi Dimitrov: Fighter Against Fascism.

=== Greece ===
- In 1974, the song Mavra Korakia along with 20 songs of album "Antartika" (The Guerilla [Songs]) were published by Notis Mavroudis and Petros Pandis, as part of the return of KKE in Greece during the Metapolitefsi. The song is a glorification of the Leipzig Trial of Dimitrov, Tanev and Popov, emphasising Dimitrov's ability to avoid hanging. It is widely sung in the left-wing circles of Greek society.

=== Hungary ===
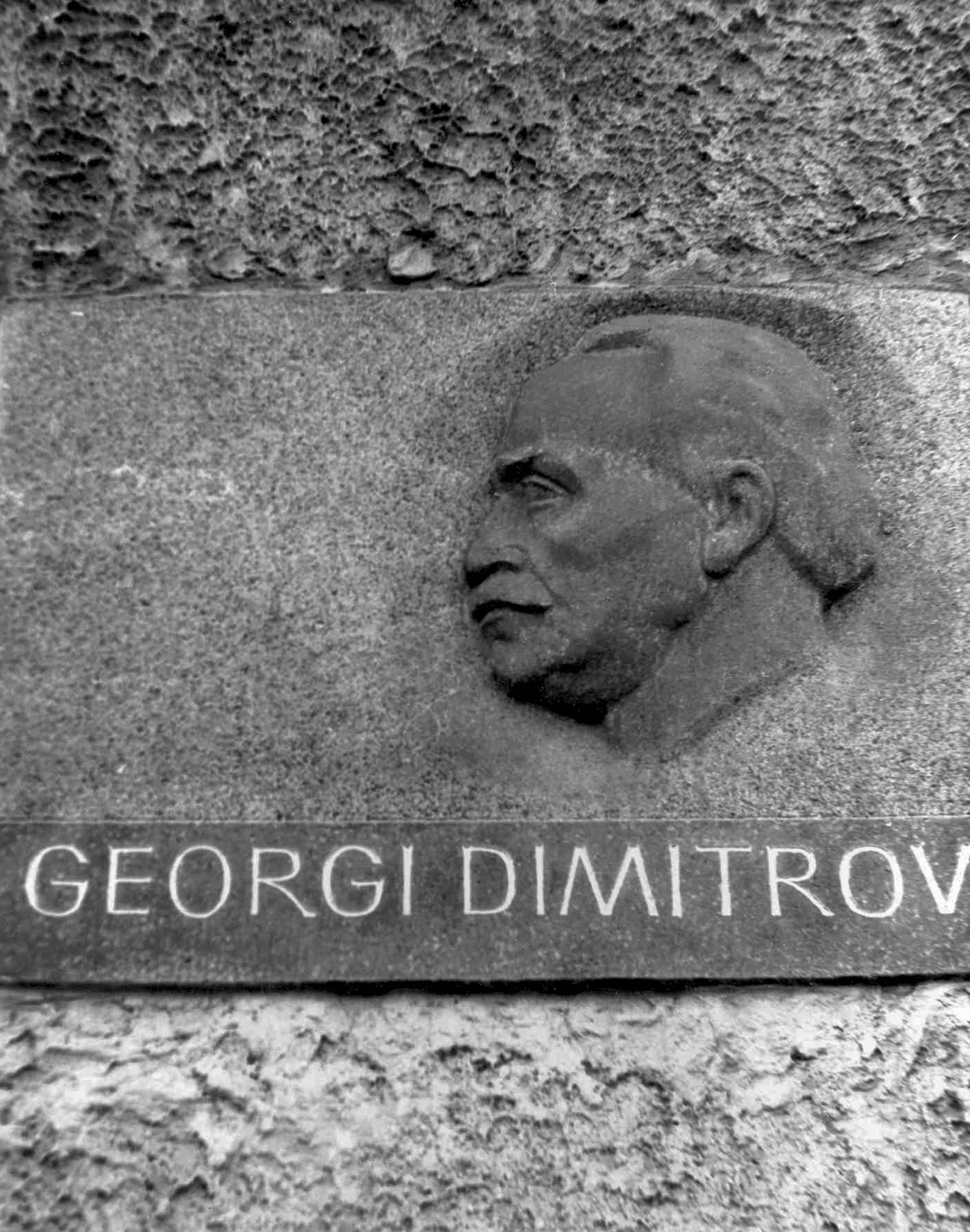
A memorial to Dimitrov in Budapest

- The square Fővám tér and the street Máriaremetei út in Budapest, Hungary were named after Dimitrov between 1949 and 1991. In the square, a bust of him was erected in 1954, replaced by a full-length statue in 1983, which was then relocated to the eponymous street a year later. Both sculptures are exhibited since 1992 in the Memento Park.
- Szentlőrincpuszta, part of Érsekvadkert was called Dimitrovpuszta (Dimitrov Plains) between 1955 and the late 1990s.

=== Italy ===
- There is a Georgi Dimitrov street in the city of Reggio Emilia, Emilia Romagna administrative region.

=== Nicaragua ===
The Sandinista government of Nicaragua renamed one of Managua's central neighbourhoods "Barrio Jorge Dimitrov" to commemorate him during that country's revolution in the 1980s.

=== Romania ===
- In Bucharest, a boulevard was named after him (Bulevardul Dimitrov). In 1990, following the fall of Communism in Eastern Europe, this boulevard was renamed in honor of the former Romanian King Ferdinand I (Bulevardul Ferdinand).

=== Russia ===
- Dimitrovgrad, Russia
- In Novosibirsk a large street leading to a bridge over the Ob River are both named after him. The bridge was opened in 1978.

=== Serbia ===
- Dimitrovgrad, Serbia (see below)

=== Slovakia ===
- During the times of the communist rule, an important chemical factory in Bratislava was called "Chemické závody Juraja Dimitrova" (colloquially Dimitrovka) in his honour. After the Velvet Revolution, it was renamed Istrochem.

=== Ukraine ===
- Dymytrov, now Myrnohrad in Ukraine was named Dymytrov between 1972 and 2016.

=== Yugoslavia ===
- After the 1963 Skopje earthquake, Bulgaria joined the international reconstruction effort by donating funds for the construction of a high school, which opened in 1964. In order to honor the donor country's first post-World War II president, the high school was named after Georgi Dimitrov, a name it still bears today.
- The town of Caribrod (Цариброд) in what was then the People's Republic of Serbia, FPRY was renamed in 1950 to Dimitrovgrad (Димитровград) to honor the late Bulgarian leader, despite the Tito-Stalin split. The name has been kept since, although in recent years the local city council has tried to restore the old name (most recently in 2019), and some people prefer the older name to avoid confusion with the Dimitrovgrad in Bulgaria.

== Sources ==
- Banac, Ivo, ed. (2003). The Diary of Georgi Dimitrov, 1933–1949. New Haven: Yale University Press. ISBN 0300097948.

Political offices
Preceded by Kimon Georgiev	Prime Minister of Bulgaria; 1946–1949	Succeeded by Vasil Kolarov
Party political offices
Preceded by office established	General Secretary of the Central Committee of the Bulgarian Communist Party; 1948–1949	Succeeded by Valko Chervenkov
