= Western Outlands =

Geopolitical region in Serbia

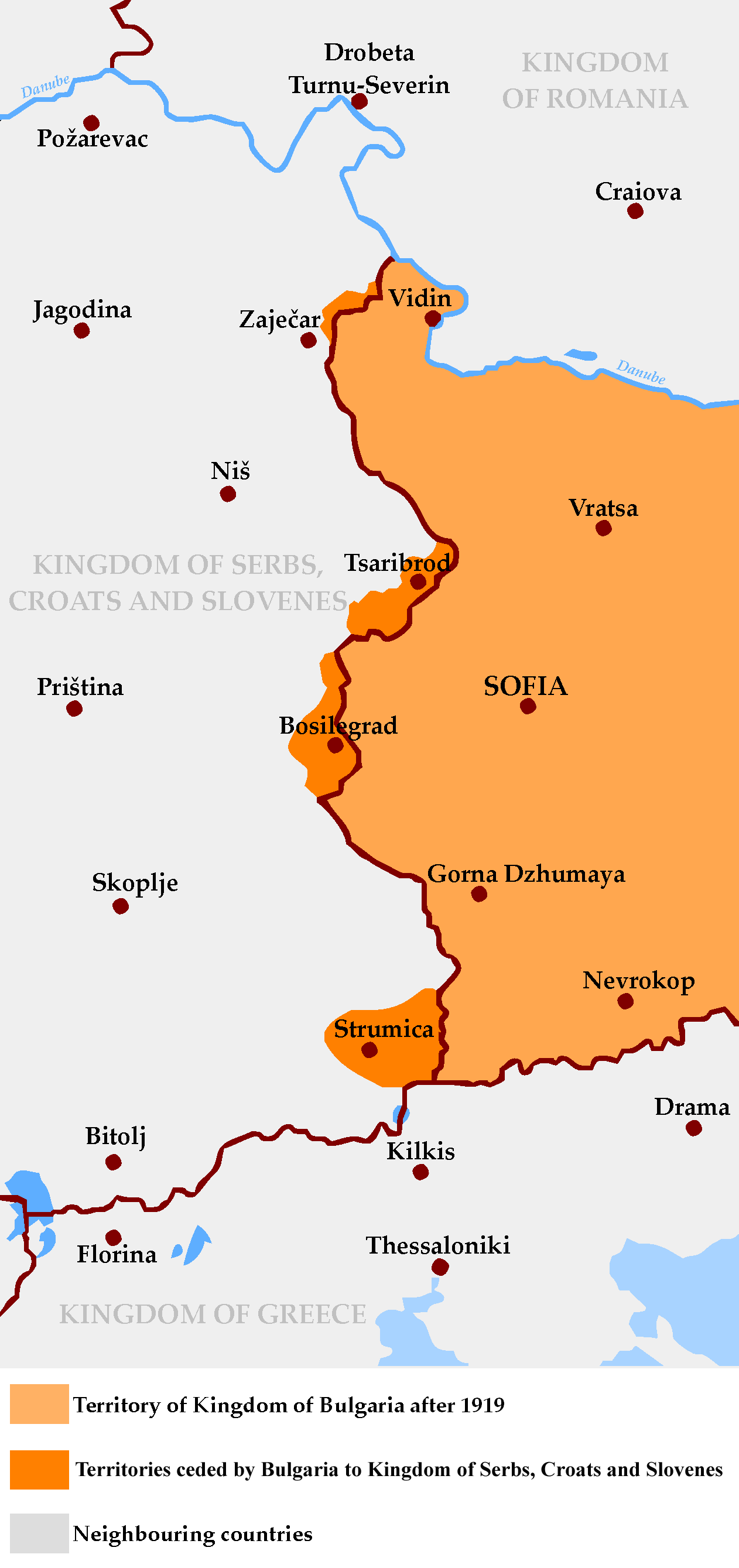
Territories ceded to Yugoslavia by Bulgaria according to 1920 Treaty of Neuilly

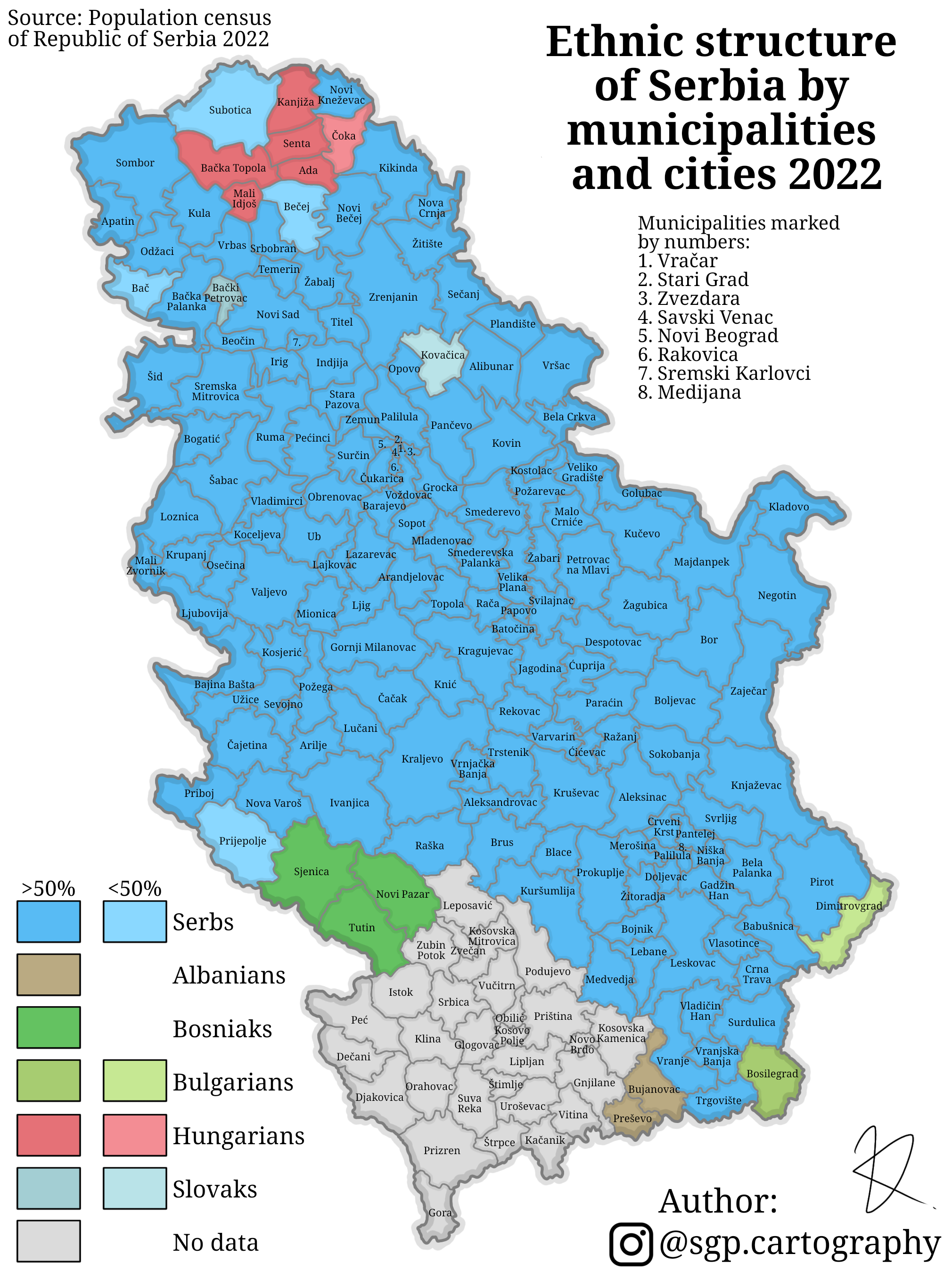
Ethnic map of Serbia according to the 2022 census; ethnic Bulgarian-majority municipalities in pale green

The Western (Bulgarian) Outlands (Bulgarian: Западни (български) покрайнини, romanized: Zapadni (bălgarski) pokrajnini) is a term used in Bulgarian to denote several regions located in former Yugoslavia, modern-day southeastern Serbia and southeastern North Macedonia, that were traditionally part of Bulgaria and which were predominantly inhabited by ethnic Bulgarians (Bulgarians in Serbia, Bulgarians in North Macedonia).

The territories in question were ceded by Bulgaria to the Kingdom of the Serbs, Croats and Slovenes in 1920 as a result of the Treaty of Neuilly, following World War I. According to the 2022 Serbian census, two municipalities, Bosilegrad and Dimitrovgrad, are populated primarily by ethnic Bulgarians.

== Etymology ==
Serbia deems the term controversial, considering that referring to parts of a neighboring country's territory as "western outlands" can imply irredentist territorial claims.

For this reason, the term has not been used by Belgrade in contacts with Sofia since 1948. It was mentioned once, in the 1947 Bled Agreement by Josip Broz Tito and Georgi Dimitrov. This was in the period of discussion for a Communist super-state in the Balkans, the Balkan Federative Republic, which was to include Yugoslavia, Albania and Bulgaria. It foresaw the return of the Western Outlands to Bulgaria. The BFR idea was abandoned with the Informbiro Resolution of 1948, when the split between Tito and Stalin occurred. Despite not being used internationally (until the 1990s when it was revived), it is very widely used in internal social and political communication in Bulgaria.

== Demographics ==
Municipality	Ethnicity						Total
Municipality	Bulgarians	%	Serbs	%	Others Undeclared Unknown	%	Total
Dimitrovgrad	3,740	46.5%	2,038	25.3%	2,222	27.6%	8,043
Bosilegrad	4,075	67.2%	786	13%	2,358	19.8%	6,065
Western Outlands	7,815	55.4%	2,824	20%	4,580	24.6%	14,108

== Internal Western Outlands Revolutionary Organization ==
The Internal Western Outland Revolutionary Organization (Bulgarian: Вътрешна западнопокрайска революционна организация, romanized: Vătrešna zapadnopokrajska revoljucionna organizacija), IWORO, was a Bulgarian separatist organization active in the Western Outlands between 1921 and 1941 in the Kingdom of Serbs, Croats and Slovenes (until 1929), and then its successor, the Kingdom of Yugoslavia.

The organization was established in 1921 on the basis of several detachments created straight after the cession of the Western Outlands to Serbia in 1920. The IWORO initially concentrated on propaganda and delivery of Bulgarian literature. The period of armed conflict started in 1922 and the organisation carried out numerous assaults on the Tzaribrod–Belgrade railway, on bridges, Yugoslav garrisons and barracks until 1941 when the region was occupied by Bulgarian troops.

Unlike the other three Bulgarian revolutionary organizations active in the interwar period — the Internal Macedonian Revolutionary Organisation in Macedonia, the Internal Thracian Revolutionary Organisation in Thrace and the Internal Dobrujan Revolutionary Organization in Dobruja — IWORO did not put up the tactical slogan demanding autonomy for the region but had an open separatist agenda; it fought “for the liberation of the Western Outlands and their restoration to Bulgaria”.

== See also ==
- Bulgarians in Serbia
- Bulgaria during World War I
- Serbian campaign
