= Internal Dobrujan Revolutionary Organisation =

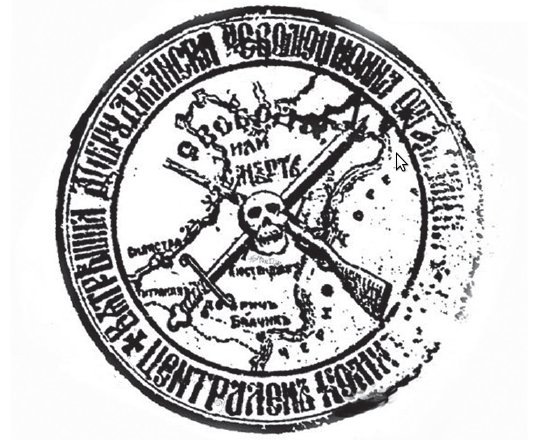
VDRO stamp

The Internal Dobrujan Revolutionary Organisation (Bulgarian: Вътрешна добруджанска революционна организация; Romanian: Organizația Revoluționară Internă Dobrogeană) or IDRO was a Bulgarian nationalist and revolutionary organisation active in Romanian Dobruja from 1923 to 1940. It was labeled a terrorist organization by the Romanian government, though in Bulgaria it was regarded as a liberation movement.

The organisation was founded in 1923 under the leadership of Docho Mihaylov and on the basis of the Great Convention of Dobruja (Велик добруджански събор), a Bulgarian political organisation established in 1919 to fight against Romanian rule in Southern Dobruja. The IDRO detachments fought against the widespread brigandage in the region, as well as the Romanian administration in the region. Like the Internal Macedonian Revolutionary Organisation in Macedonia and the Internal Thracian Revolutionary Organisation in Thrace, IDRO demanded political autonomy of Dobruja under the mandate of the League of Nations raising the slogan for the establishment of an "autonomous Dobruja" under the supervision of the League of Nations and "Dobruja for the Dobrujans".

In 1925, a left-wing organisation named the Dobrujan Revolutionary Organisation (Добруджанска революционна организация) seceded from the organisation under the influence of the Bulgarian Communist Party. This wing militated for a Soviet Republic of Dobruja, which would either be part of a "Balkan Communist Federation" or to become a Republic of the Soviet Union. The division of IDRO significantly hampered the work of the organisation, although it continued its activity under different forms until 1940 when Southern Dobruja was restored to Bulgaria under the terms of the Treaty of Craiova.

== See also ==
- Internal Revolutionary Organisation
- Internal Western Outland Revolutionary Organisation

== Bibliography ==
- Национално-освободително движение в Добруджа 1878-1940
- Добруджанските младежки организации в България (1919-1934)Кристина Попова
- The Communist Party of Bulgaria; origins and development, 1883–1936, p. 200, Joseph Rothschild, Columbia University Press, 1959
- Communism in Rumania, 1944–1962, Ghița Ionescu, Greenwood Press, 1976, ISBN 0-8371-8168-2, p. 25.
