= Saranovo =

- Village
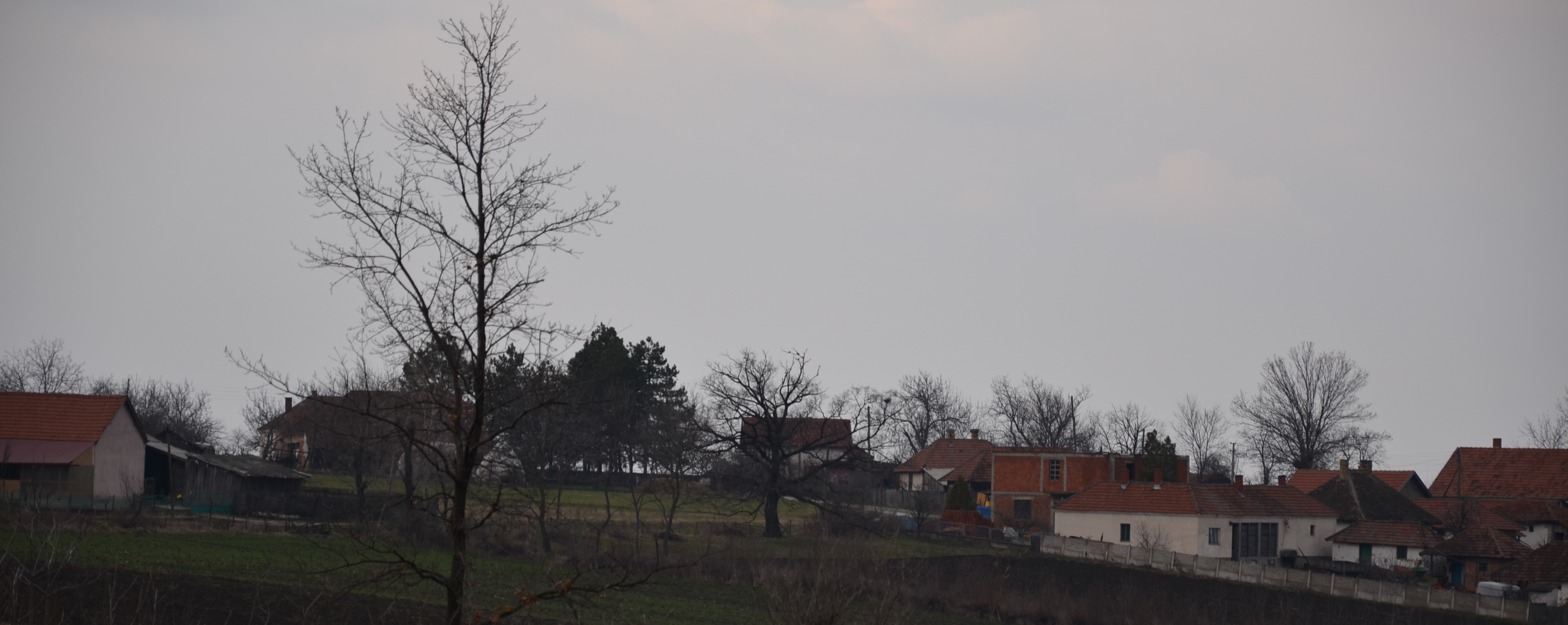

- Location within Serbia
- Coordinates: 44°15′N 20°51′E
- Country: Serbia
- District: Šumadija District
- Municipality: Rača

Population (2002)
  - Total: 1,241
- Time zone: UTC+1 (CET)
  - Summer (DST): UTC+2 (CEST)

Saranovo (Serbian: Сараново) is a village in the municipality of Rača, Serbia. According to the 2002 census, the village has a population of 1241 people.
