= Tane Nikolov =

Bulgarian revolutionary and military leader active before and during WW I

Voivode Tane Nikolov
- Тане Николов
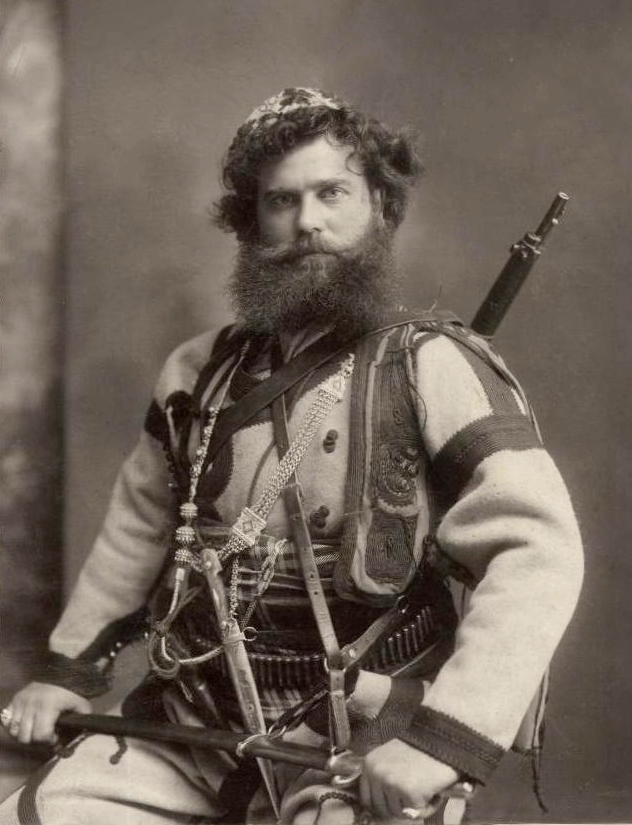
- Tane Nikolov c. 1906
- Born: 9 March 1873; Haskovo, Adrianople Vilayet, Ottoman Empire (now Bulgaria)
- Died: 19 January 1947 (aged 73); Asenovgrad, People's Republic of Bulgaria
- Relatives: Mamin Kolyu (nephew)
- Military career
- Allegiance: IMRO; ITRO
- Conflicts: Ilinden-Preobrazhenie Uprising (WIA); Macedonian Struggle

Tane Nikolov (Bulgarian: Тане Николов; 9 March 1873 – 19 January 1947) was a Bulgarian revolutionary and member of the revolutionary movement in Macedonia, Thrace and Pomoravlje. He was among the leading members of the Secret Macedonian-Adrianople Revolutionary Organization, Internal Western Outland Revolutionary Organisation and the leader of the Internal Thracian Revolutionary Organisation. Nikolov was also participant in the wars for National unification of Bulgaria.

== Early life ==
Tane Nikolov was born in Haskovo in the family of Nikola Zhekov and Rada Stoeva who both come from the village of Gorski izvor near Dimitrovgrad. His nephew was to become yet another famous Bulgarian revolutionary – Nikola Koev (Mamin Kolyo). Tane finished first grade in Haskovo in the already liberated Bulgaria. He was still young when he lost first his wife and soon after his daughter to an illness. In the end of June 1902 he quit the army and joined the revolutionary movement in Eastern Thrace. There he met Boris Sarafov and the two of them became lifelong friends.

== In Thrace ==
From 1903 Tane Nikolov lead his own division with which he took part in the Ilinden-Preobrazhenie uprising. Afterwards, in July 1904, he headed the bombing of a Turkish train and the unsuccessful assault of a train station. His division entered constant battles with the authorities during one of which in December 1904, Tane was wounded. Despite that just weeks later they entered another battle.

== In Macedonia ==
In 1906 Tane moved from Thrace to Florina in the region of Macedonia (what is now Greek Macedonia). A year later he became voivode of the regions of Prilep and Veles. During the whole year he battled Turkish and Serbian forces. In July 1907 Tane headed the united divisions of the organization in what turned to be the biggest battle against the authorities after the Ilinden-Preobrazhenie uprising. Fifty-four revolutionaries lost their lives in the battle of "Nozhot" (the Knife) which was later sung in songs by the people and celebrated during Serbian rule.

In 1907 after Boris Sarafov and Ivan Garvanov were killed by the inner opposition in IMARO, Tane Nikolov found new friends in the faces of Hristo Matov, Vasil Chekalarov and Nikola Kostov. In March 1908 he attended the IMARO congress near the town of Kyustendil as a delegate from the region of Monastir. He is consequently appointed inspector of all revolutionary divisions in Western Macedonia.

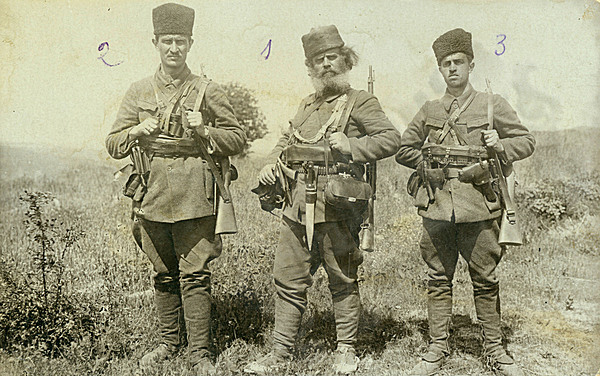
2-Fuat (Balkan) bey, 1-Tane Nikolov and 3-Hikmet (Balkan) bey, leaders of Bulgarian-Turkish Revolutionary Organization in Western Thrace (1922)
