= Internal Thracian Revolutionary Organisation =

Bulgarian revolutionary organisation, 1920–1934

The Internal Thracian Revolutionary Organisation (ITRO, Bulgarian: Вътрешна тракийска революционна организация, Vătrešna trakijska revoljucionna organizacija, VTRO) was a Bulgarian revolutionary organisation active in Western Thrace, the eastern part of Greek Macedonia (to the Struma river) and southern Bulgaria between 1920 and 1934.

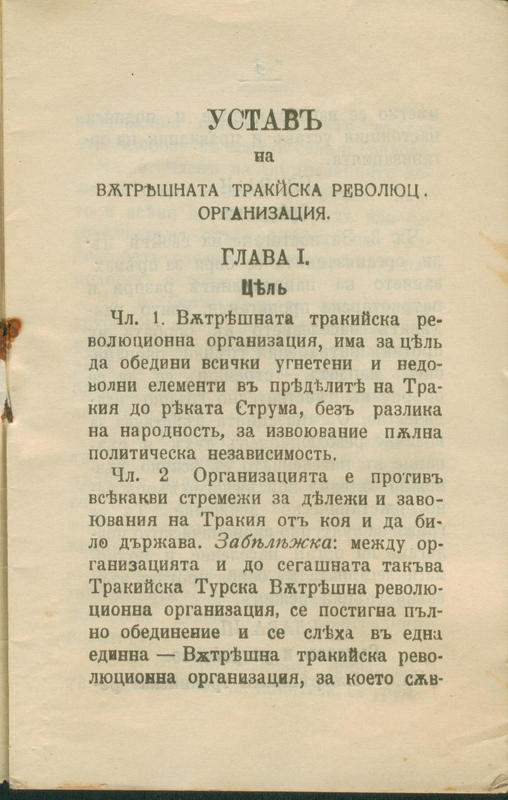
Excerpt from the statute of ITRO, 1923 (in Bulgarian) Statute of the Internal Thracian Revolutionary Organisation Chapter I. - Goal Art. 1. The Internal Thracian Revolutionary Organisation has the goal of uniting all the disgruntled elements in Thrace to the river Struma, regardless of their nationality, to win, through a revolution, a full political independence. Art. 2. The organisation is against any attempts and wishes for divisions and conquests of Thrace, from each ever state.

== History ==
The reason for the establishment of ITRO was the deplorable situation of the Thracian Bulgarians in Western Thrace after the transfer of the region from Bulgaria to Greece in May, 1920. After the catastrophic defeat suffered by the Greek army in Anatolia in 1922, a stream of Greek refugees poured into Greece and settled, for the most part, in Greek Macedonia and Western Thrace. In order to provide housing for the refugees, the Greek government interned tens of thousands of Bulgarians from Western Thrace on the Aegean Sea islands. These returned to their homes after an intervention of the League of Nations, only to find them occupied by Greek refugees from Asia Minor.

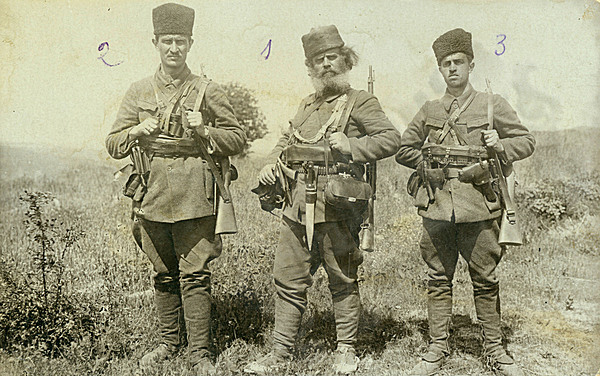
Tane Nikolov with other voivodas as leader of Internal Thracian Revolutionary Organization (1922).

The desperate situation forced the Bulgarians to resort to armed struggle. ITRO was formed under the leadership of Tane Nikolov - former band leader of the Internal Macedonian-Adrianople Revolutionary Organization (IMARO) and its detachments started to launch attacks on the Greek garrisons in the region. The organisation acted in co-operation with the representatives of the Muslims (Turks) in Western Thrace raising the slogan for the establishment of “independent Thrace” under the supervision of the League of Nations and "Thrace for the Thracians".

At the end of 1922, the Greek government started to expel large numbers of Bulgarians into Bulgaria and the activity of ITRO grew into an open rebellion. The organisation eventually gained full control of some districts along the Bulgarian border. In the summer of 1923, however, the Turks withdrew from the co-operation after the Treaty of Lausanne had guaranteed their rights. By that time, the majority of the Bulgarians had already been resettled to Bulgaria. In the same year the organization was banned by the Bulgarian government and Tane Nikolov disbanded it. However it was reestablished in the same year by the voivoda Dimitar Madzharov. Although detachments of the ITRO continued to infiltrate Western Thrace sporadically, the main focus of the activity of the organisation now shifted to the protection of the refugees into Bulgaria. The organisation became a state within the state in the districts of Haskovo and Kurdzhali where the majority of the refugees were concentrated, aiding their settlement and collecting taxes from tobacco merchants. As the activity of the organisation started to cause international problems for the Bulgarian government, ITRO was again formally disbanded in 1927, to be right away re-assembled under the name of Committee for Free Thrace (Bulgarian: Комитет за свободна Тракия). The committee existed until 1934 when it was finally disbanded by the government of Kimon Georgiev.

== See also ==
- Internal Macedonian Revolutionary Organisation
- Internal Dobrudjan Revolutionary Organisation
- Internal Western Outland Revolutionary Organisation

== Sources ==
- Регионaлизмът кaто тaктикa в нaционaлното освобождение.Принос към идеятa за нaционaлно помирение.Спaс Тaшев. "Македония", брой 7, 17 февруари 1999 г. (in Bulgarian)
- ГРУПАТА "ЗОРА" И ВОЙВОДАТА ДИМИТЪР МАДЖАРОВ ВЪВ ВЪТРЕШНАТА ТРАКИЙСКА РЕВОЛЮЦИОННА ОРГАНИЗАЦИЯ /ВТРО/. Емилия-Боряна Славкова (in Bulgarian)
