= Ivan Todorov =

Ivan Todorov may refer to:

- Ivan Todorov (footballer) (born 1987), Bulgarian football defender
- Ivan Todorov (judoka) (born 1967), Yugoslav judoka and Serbian diplomat

== See also ==
- Ivan Todorov-Gorunya (1916–1965), Bulgarian politician
