= Tone Perenovski =

Bulgarian WW2 Partisan

Tone Penkov Perenovski
- Born: May 4, 1909; Stolnik, Kingdom of Bulgaria
- Died: 1985 (age 75-76); Sofia, Bulgaria
- Allegiance: Bulgaria
- Rank: Major General
- Known for: First Commander of the Chavdar Partisan Brigade
- Awards: Order of Saint Alexander
- Alma mater: Communist University of the National Minorities of the West

Tone Penkov Perenovski was a participant in the Bulgarian communist resistance movement during World War II, he was the first Commander of the Chavdar Partisan Brigade

== Biography ==
Tone Perenovski was born on May 4, 1909, in the village of Stolnik, near Sofia. He was a member of the BCMA since 1930, and of the BCP since 1931. From 1932 to 1936, he was a political emigrant in the USSR. While in Russia, he graduated from the Communist University of the National Minorities of the West in 1936.

He returned to Bulgaria soon after, though shortly after he arrived, he was convicted of political activity under the CPA. He served his sentence in Sliven Prison.

He took part in the communist resistance movement during the Second World War. He was interned in the Krastopole camp, but managed to escape, he then went underground. He became a Partisan in 1942, and participated in the creation of the Chavdar Partisan Brigade, being made the first Commander of the brigade from September 1942 to October 1943.

After the formation of the Fatherland Front on September 9, 1944, he served as a political officer in the BNA, and became the Deputy Commander of the 8th Infantry Division. From November 8, 1944, he was assistant commander of the Fifth Bomber Regiment.

After the end of the Second World War, he was transferred to economic work and became the first deputy chairman of the General Directorate of Roads. In 1969 he was promoted to the rank of Major General of the Reserve. He was a member of the Central Committee of the Bulgarian Communist Party from 1966 to 1976. He was awarded the Order of Saint Alexander, V degree, m.s.
