= 1965 Bulgarian coup attempt =

1965 Bulgarian coup d'état attempt
- Part of the Cold War and spillover of the Sino-Soviet split
Date	April 1965
Location	People's Republic of Bulgaria
Result	Coup d'état suppressed

Belligerents
Todorov-Gorunya group	(Bulgaria) Bulgarian government Supported by: Soviet Union

Commanders and leaders
Ivan Todorov-Gorunya ‡‡ Tsolo Krastev; Tsvyatko Anev; Ivan Velchev	(Bulgaria) Todor Zhivkov (Bulgaria) Angel Solakov (Bulgaria) Mircho Spasov (Bulgaria) Diko Dikov

Casualties and losses
1 suicide 200 arrested	None

The 1965 Bulgarian coup d'état attempt was an attempt by officials in the Bulgarian Communist Party and officers in the Bulgarian People's Army to oust the leadership of the party, more specifically the General-Secretary Todor Zhivkov. These plans were foiled in April 1965 before the coup could be carried out.

== Background ==
After the death of Joseph Stalin in 1953 the new Soviet leadership under Nikita Khrushchev began a process of liberalization and de-Stalinization. This created a power struggle within the party between the hardliners who opposed the reforms and Khrushchev's supporters. Internationally, the divide between the Soviets and the leadership of China became apparent in the early 60s with the Sino-Soviet split.

In Bulgaria, the Stalinist Valko Chervenkov was dismissed from the leadership of the party in 1954 and then from his position as Prime Minister in 1955. The new General-Secretary (Zhivkov) began to implement de-Stalinization in the Bulgarian Communist Party. Anton Yugov succeeded Chervenkov as Prime Minister, but was removed in 1962 — succeeded by Zhivkov — allowing the latter to remain the unchallenged ruler and leader of Bulgaria.

== Preparations ==
In October 1964 two members of the Central Committee of the Bulgarian Communist Party, Ivan Todorov-Gorunya and Tsolo Krastev, began to plot against Zhivkov. The conspirators were hardline communists, influenced by Mao Zedong of China, who denounced the leadership of the Communist Party for having become "opportunists" and for following the "revisionist" Soviet leader, Nikita Khrushchev. Although Khrushchev was removed on 14 October, the conspirators aimed at establishing a more Marxist–Leninist Bulgaria. Several dozen officers joined, including the commander of the Sofia garrison General Tsvyatko Anev; the head of the personal cabinet of the Мinister of Defence, Colonel Ivan Velchev; the deputy chief of the Мain Political Directorate of the Bulgarian People's Army General Мicho Ermenov; and the chief of department at the General Staff, General Lyuben Dinov.

The plan was to execute the coup with the aid of the Bulgarian People's Army during the plenum of the Central Committee of the BCP. They planned to use the tank brigade based around Sofia, the Guard Division and the First Army headquarters in Sofia as a show of force against the party leadership.

== Discovery of the plot ==
The conspirators aroused suspicion and a counter-intelligence operation carried out between 28 March and 12 April 1965 uncovered the scheme and arrested those involved. Some sources say that the leaders of the plot were being spied on even before 1964 because they were not fully trusted by the party leadership. The first arrested was General Anev on 8 April 1965. Following his arrest the coup leader, Todorov-Gorunya, committed suicide at home. On 12 April the rest of the plotters were arrested. Nine of them were court martialed and were given sentences varying from 8 to 15 years, and another 192 people were given administrative penalties.

== Domestic response ==
Rumors spread throughout Sofia about the suicide of a high-ranked party official and about the possibility of a plot against the current leadership. The state-controlled media, however, denounced all rumors as "fantastic fabrications and malicious propaganda."

== Rehabilitation ==
On 15 June 1990 the Military College of the Supreme Court rehabilitated the convicted conspirators, stating: "These offenses were socially necessary and aimed at the overthrow of a regime, which has absolutely been proven to have been dictatorial".

== See also ==
- Anti-Party Group
- Gang of Four
- Albanian–Soviet split
