= Museum of Socialist Art =

Museum in Sofia, Bulgaria

Museum of Socialist Art, Sofia
- Музей на социалистическото изкуство
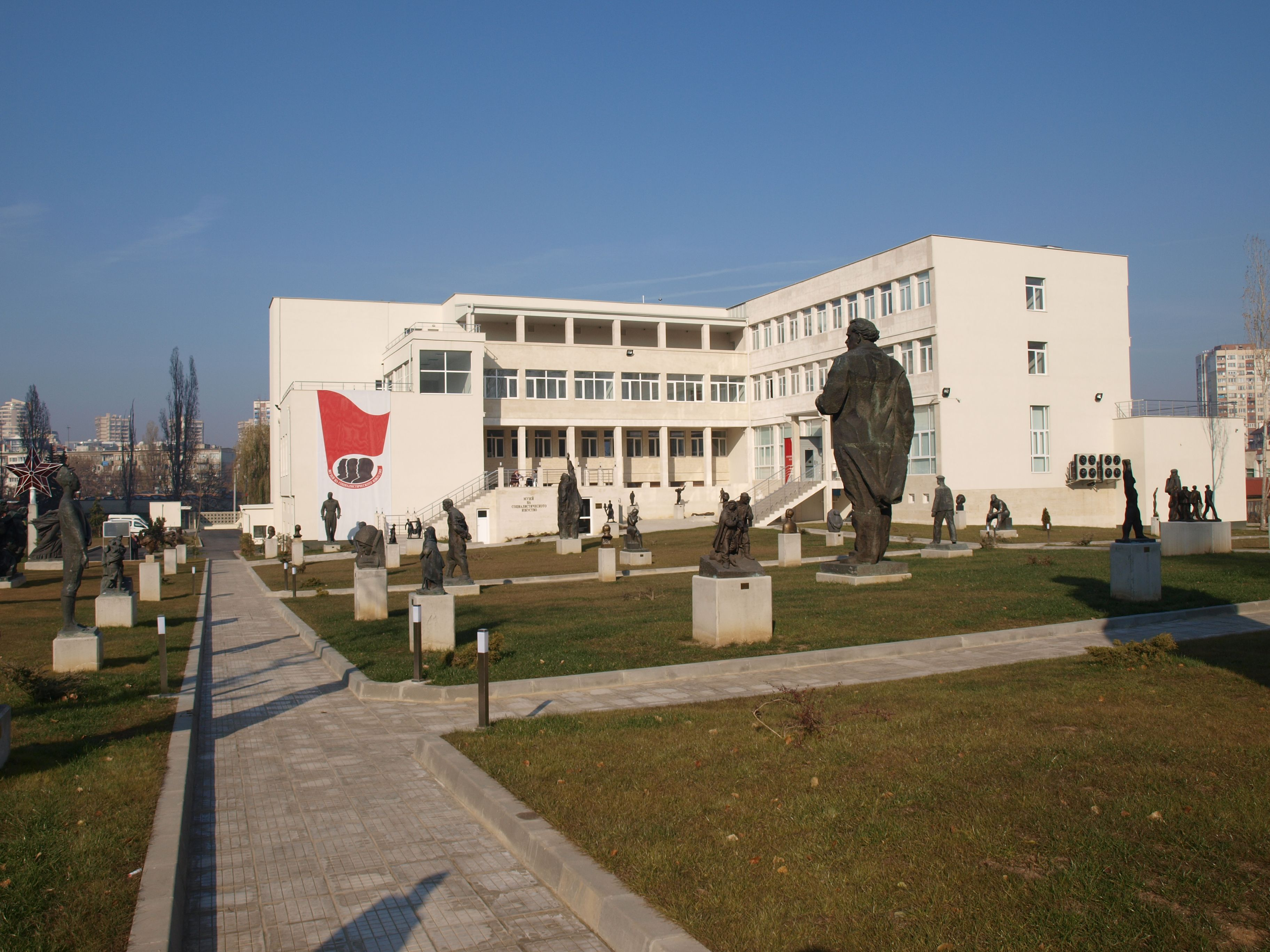
- The museum with the statue park in 2012

- Location within Bulgaria
- Established: 19 September 2011
- Location: Sofia, Bulgaria
- Coordinates: 42.666°N 23.3577°E
- Collection size: 200 artifacts
- Director: Bisera Yosifova
- Curator: Bisera Yosifova

The Museum of Socialist Art (Bulgarian: Музей на социалистическото изкуство, romanized: Muzey na sotsialisticheskoto izkustvo) in Sofia is a museum of art which covers the history of the communist era in Bulgaria. It was established on 19 September 2011 amidst a controversy over the name, which was initially proposed as "Museum of Totalitarian Art". The museum's collection of large and small statues, busts, and paintings represents the period from 1944 to 1989, from the establishment of the People's Republic of Bulgaria to the fall of communism. The museum spread over an area of 7,500 square metres (81,000 sq ft) in the Sofia suburb known as "Red Star" is in three parts - a park with sculpture installations drawn from the communist period, an exhibition hall with paintings and easel representations, and a media or video hall in which films and newsreels related to the communist period are screened.

== History ==
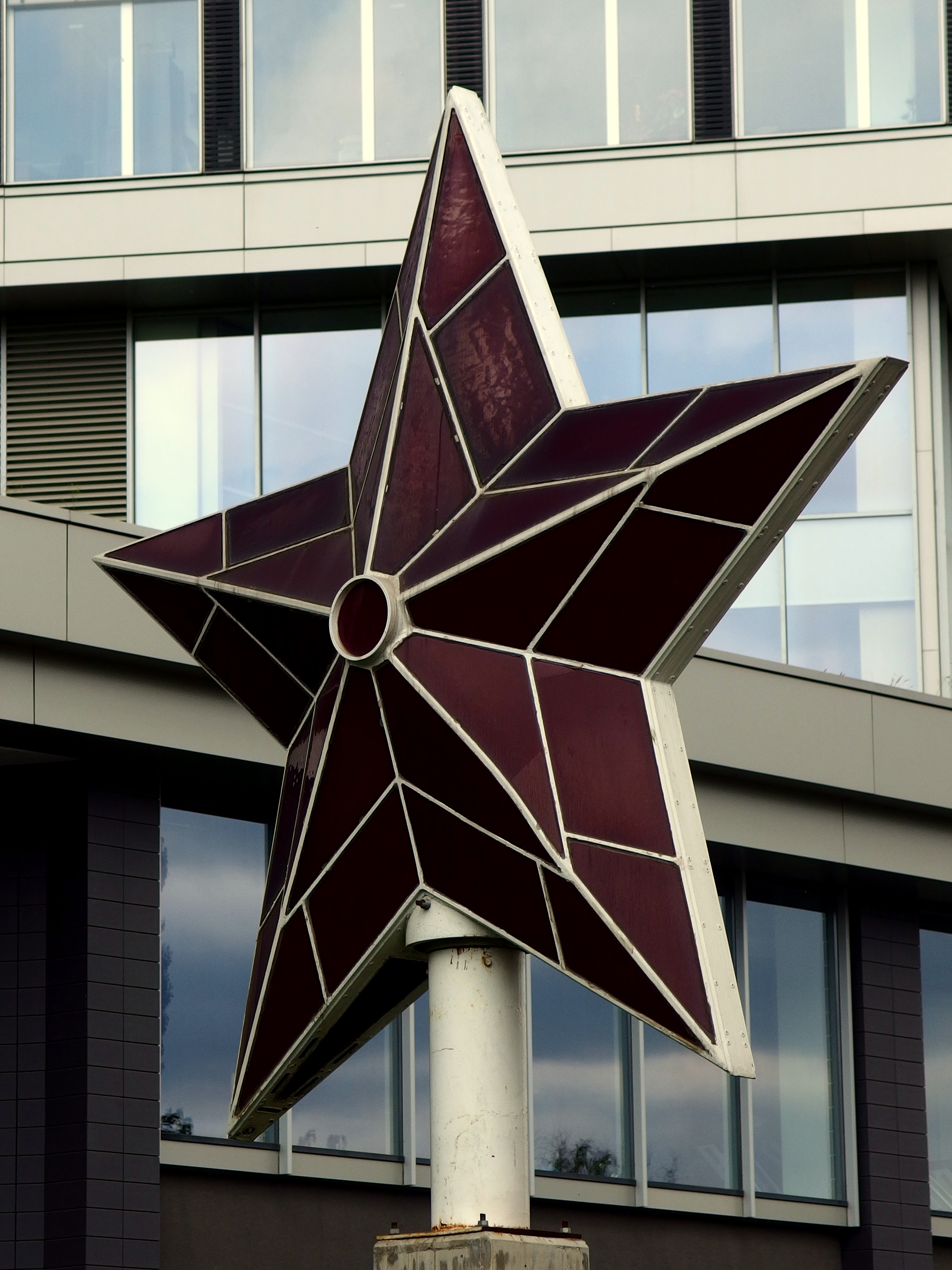
"Five-pointed star" of the former Party House now at the entrance of the Museum of Socialist Art

Many projects were mooted since the 1990s for establishing museums of communism in Sofia, Dimitrovgrad, and Haskovo, but none came to fruition. During the same period, many monuments of the Soviet regime were destroyed or dismantled. During the summer of 2011 attempts to create exhibits on the role of the communist regime in Bulgaria were made by a group of artists who painted "pop icons" on the Soviet army memorial in Sofia in June 2011. At that point, the government decided to establish museums in Bulgaria and also to restore dismantled monuments. The establishment of the Museum of Contemporary Art, the Museum of Ancient Sofia, and the National Museum Complex (renamed as "the Bulgarian Louvre") came to be established in Sofia as a result of that decision. At the same time it was decided by Ministry of Culture to create the Museum of Socialist Art in Sofia to enhance the city's cultural ambiance and its position as a major tourist attraction, in conformity with similarly themed museums that had been established in many cities of Eastern Europe. It was also considered and accepted by the ministry that the museum would be a subsidiary of the National Gallery of Art. Vezhdi Rashidov, the Minister of Culture, himself a sculptor, took the initiative to see through the project of creating the museum for exhibiting the artistic heritage of the communist regime. The Government of Bulgaria fully supported the initiative and provided funds to the extent of 1.5 million euros to establish the museum, hoping that the revenue from the sale of entry tickets would recover this cost in a period of 2 years. The remnants of the socialist regime were found from basements of every town in Bulgaria for installation at the museum before it formally opened on 19 September 2011.

Amidst controversy, the museum's name, originally planned to be "Museum of Totalitarian Art", was changed to "Museum of Socialist Art". The new museum was formally inaugurated on 19 September 2011.

At the inauguration, which was held in the presence of Prime Minister Boyko Borisov, Mayor of Sofia Yordanka Fandakova, and many ministers, the Finance Minister Simeon Djankov stated: "We are closing one page of the Bulgarian history and communism is going where it belongs – in the museum ... Bulgaria has already shaken it off and is moving forward". The date of the inauguration also marked the formal occupation of Bulgaria by communists in 1944. As journalist Georgi Lozanov noted: "Bulgaria must have a museum of communism that will tell new generations the story of a period that should never again become reality".

== Description ==
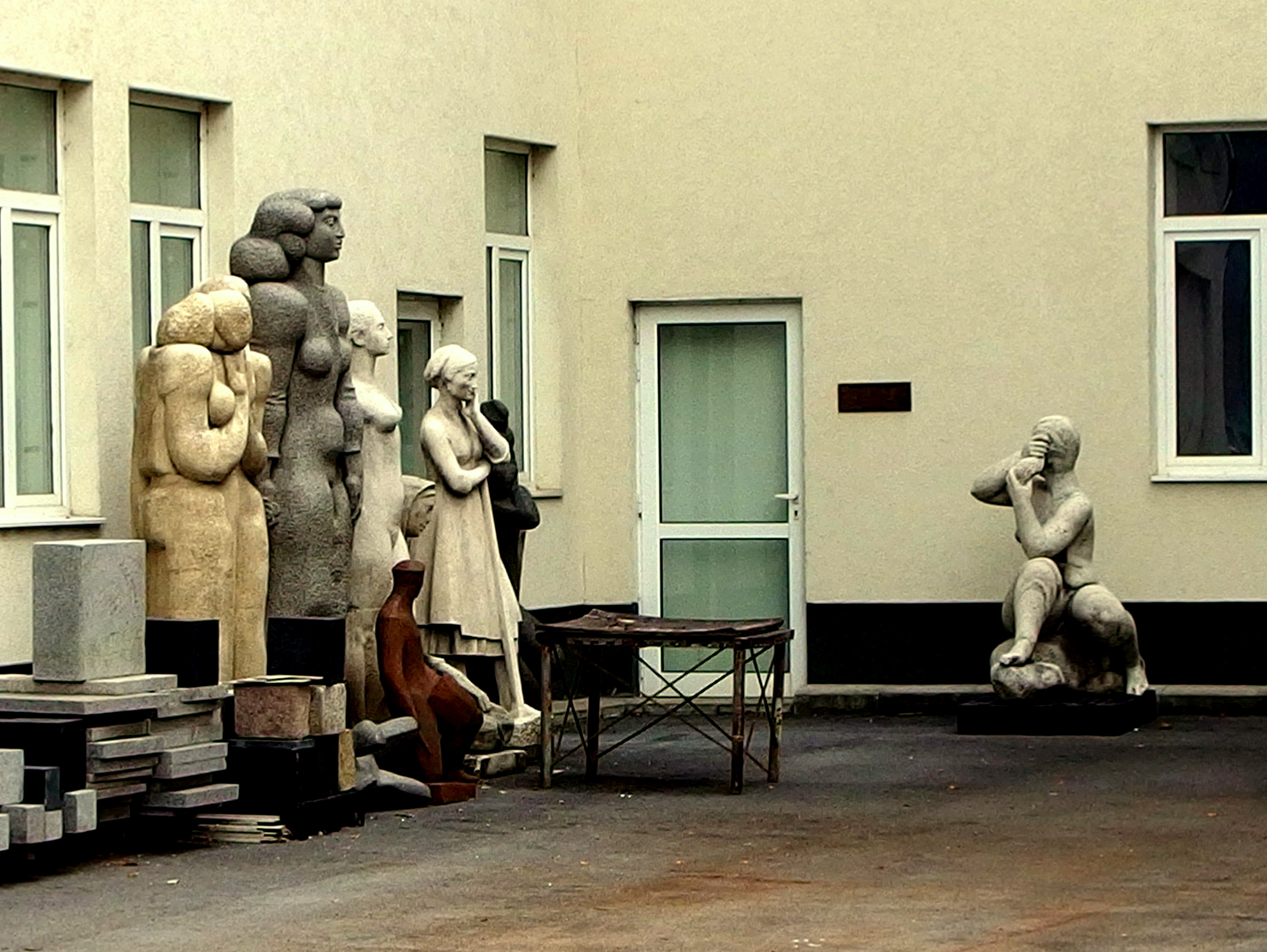
Exhibits in the museum

The museum, a branch of the national art gallery, has a display of socialist regime of 45 years (1944–89) period of art symbols and other artifacts and archives with statues in the park. The museum covers an area of 7,500 square metres (81,000 sq ft) in the Sofia suburb known as "Red Star". It consists of three parts: a park in which 77 statues or sculptures drawn from the communist period, including a statue of Vladimir Lenin, have been erected; an exhibition hall with 60 paintings and 25 easel paintings representations; and a media or video hall in which propaganda films and newsreels related to the communist period are screened. There is also a souvenir kiosk where communist period memorabilia are sold. The museum's collection covers the period from 1944 to 1989, from the introduction of communism to Bulgaria to the end of the totalitarian regime. At the entrance of the museum stands a large "five-pointed star" which had earlier adorned the Party House in Sofia from 1954 to 1984. The statue park, which is said to be the "most representative part of the museum", features statues, busts, and figures of popular communist leaders and activists, of poets, sculptures of Red army soldiers, agricultural and industrial workers, and so forth.

Within the museum hall there are sculptures of communist leaders Todor Zhivkov, Vladimir Lenin, and Joseph Stalin. Some of the exhibits with artistic expression are attributed to many well-known sculptors of the communist regime. Paintings made by artists during the communist regime are also on display, including depictions of the entry of the Soviet Army in 1944, the creation of communist party branches, portraits, and landscapes. Most of the exhibits on display are of "trials of the partisan and resistance movement during World War II", the creation of the socialistic pattern of society, and people's contented life. Some of the paintings depict "Herculean-sized laborers". Many oil paintings extol the presumed theme of "eternal friendship" between Bulgaria and the Soviet Union. In the museum's restaurant, there are portraits of Karl Marx, Lenin, Engles and Stalin which are evocative of incongruity.

In 2012, an exhibition on "The Cultural Opening of Bulgaria to the World", which was the creation of Lyudmila Zhivkova, the daughter of Todor Zhivkov who ruled in 1953, and which brought into focus "a golden age of socialist culture" was also exhibited at this museum.

== Bibliography ==
- Kay, Annie (2015). Bulgaria. Bradt Travel Guides. ISBN 978-1-84162-937-7.
- Knell, Simon (2016). National Galleries. Routledge. ISBN 978-1-317-43242-5.
- Smith, Stephen Anthony (2014). The Oxford Handbook of the History of Communism. OUP Oxford. ISBN 978-0-19-960205-6.
- Todorova, Maria; Dimou, Augusta; Troebst, Stefan (2014). Remembering Communism: Private and Public Recollections of Lived Experience in Southeast Europe. Central European University Press. ISBN 978-963-386-034-2.
