= Todor Zhivkov =

Leader of Bulgaria from 1956 to 1989

- Тодор Живков
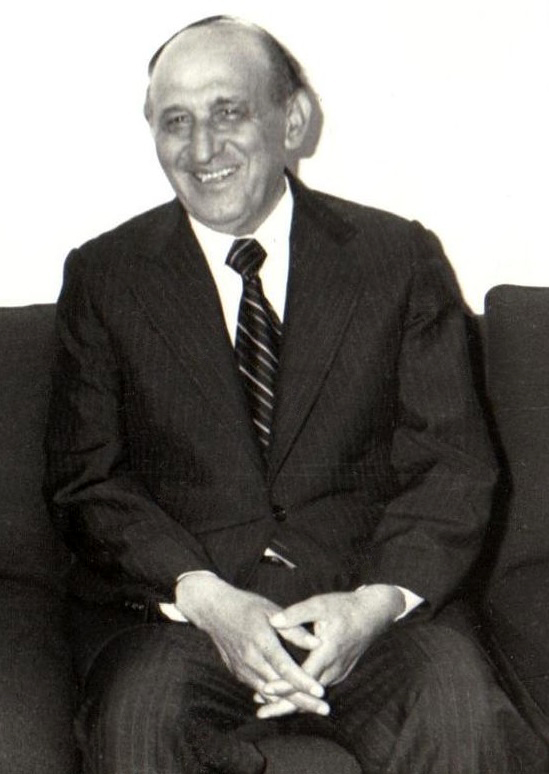
- Zhivkov in 1979

General Secretary of the Central Committee of the Bulgarian Communist Party (until 4 April 1981 as First Secretary)
- In office 4 March 1954 – 10 November 1989
- Preceded by: Valko Chervenkov
- Succeeded by: Petar Mladenov

1st Chairman of the State Council (until 12 June 1978 as President)
- In office 7 July 1971 – 17 November 1989
- Preceded by: Georgi Traykov (as Chairman of the Presidium of the National Assembly)
- Succeeded by: Petar Mladenov

36th Prime Minister of Bulgaria
- In office 19 November 1962 – 7 July 1971
- Preceded by: Anton Yugov
- Succeeded by: Stanko Todorov

48th Mayor of Sofia
- In office 27 May 1949 – 1 November 1949
- Preceded by: Anton Yugov
- Succeeded by: Stanko Todorov

Personal details
- Born: 7 September 1911 Pravets, Kingdom of Bulgaria
- Died: 5 August 1998 (aged 86) Sofia, Bulgaria
- Resting place: Central Sofia Cemetery
- Party: Bulgarian Communist Party (1932–1989); Bulgarian Socialist Party (1998)
- Spouse: Mara Maleeva-Zhivkova (m. 1936; died 1971)
- Children: Lyudmila, Vladimir
- De facto leader of the PRB (In role with Valko Chervenkov between 1954 and 1956): ← Chervenkov; Mladenov →

Todor Hristov Zhivkov (Bulgarian: Тодор Христов Живков [ˈtɔdor ˈxristof ˈʒifkof]; 7 September 1911 – 5 August 1998) was a Bulgarian communist politician who served as the de facto leader of the People's Republic of Bulgaria (PRB) from 1956 until 1989 as General Secretary of the Central Committee of the Bulgarian Communist Party. He was the longest-serving leader in the Eastern Bloc, the longest-serving leader within the Warsaw Pact and the longest-serving non-royal ruler in Bulgarian history.

During World War II, Zhivkov participated in Bulgaria's resistance movement in the People's Liberation Insurgent Army. In 1943, he was involved in organising the Chavdar Partisan Brigade in and around his place of birth, becoming deputy commander of the Sofia operations area in the summer of 1944. Under his rule, many fellow former combatants with Chavdar were to rise to positions of prominence in Bulgarian affairs. He is said to have coordinated partisan movements with those of pro-Soviet army units during the 9 September 1944 uprising.

He became First Secretary of the Bulgarian Communist Party (BCP) in 1954 (General Secretary from April 1981), served as Prime Minister from 1962 to 1971 and from 1971 onwards as Chairman of the State Council, concurrently with his post as First Secretary. He remained in these positions for 35 years, until 1989, thus becoming the longest-serving leader of any European Eastern Bloc nation after World War II, and one of the longest ruling non-royal leaders in modern history. His rule marked a period of unprecedented political and economic stability for Bulgaria, marked both by complete submission of Bulgaria to the Soviet Union and a desire to expand ties with the West. Bulgaria placed paramount importance on scientific and technological progress, as well as on the cultivation of trade skills suited to an industrial economy. In 1948, roughly 80 percent of the population depended on agriculture for their livelihood; by 1988, however, fewer than one in five workers remained in the agricultural sector, with the rest concentrated in industry and services. Zhivkov's government maintained a tight policy against minority groups throughout his tenure; most notably, from 1984 onward, tightened internal policies led to the Revival Process against Bulgarian Turks, a policy of forced assimilation which led to a large-scale expulsion of Turks and Muslims in 1989.

Zhivkov's rule remained unchallenged until the deterioration of East–West relations in the 1980s, when a stagnating economic situation, a worsening international image and growing careerism and corruption in the BCP weakened his position. He resigned on 10 November 1989, under pressure by senior BCP members due to his refusal to recognise problems and deal with public protests. Within a month of Zhivkov's ousting, communist rule in Bulgaria had effectively ended, and within a year the People's Republic of Bulgaria had formally ceased to exist.

== Early life ==
Zhivkov was born in the Bulgarian village of Pravets into a peasant family, to Hristo Todorov Zhivkov and Maruza Gergova Zhivkova. The exact date of Zhivkov's birth was in dispute within Zhivkov's family, as his mother insisted that he had been born on 20 September 1911. However, Zhivkov would say in his memoirs that the Orthodox priest that was charged with keeping the records of new births at the time was found to be very drunk and forgot to write down the actual day of birth, instead writing in only the day of baptism. Expressing confidence in his knowledge of local custom, this allowed him to calculate that his actual day of birth had been 13 days earlier – on 7 September of that year. He had apparently been able to verify this as his real date of birth, though he continued to jokingly argue with his mother about the incident for years on end.

In 1928, he joined the Bulgarian Communist Youth Union (BCYU), an organisation closely linked with the Bulgarian Workers Party (BWP) – later the Bulgarian Communist Party (BCP). The following year he obtained a post at the Darzhavna pechatnitsa, the official government publisher in Sofia. In 1932, he joined the BWP proper, later serving as secretary of its Second Borough Committee and as a member of its Sofia County Committee. Although the BWP was banned along with all other political parties after the coup of 19 May 1934, it continued fielding a handful of non-party National Assembly Deputies and Zhivkov retained his posts at its Sofia structure.

During World War II, Zhivkov participated in Bulgaria's resistance movement in the People's Liberation Insurgent Army against the country's alignment with Nazi Germany and was sympathetic to the country's 50,000 Jews. In 1943, he was involved in organising the Chavdar Partisan Brigade in and around his place of birth, becoming deputy commander of the Sofia operations area in the summer of 1944. Under his rule, many fellow former combatants with Chavdar were to rise to positions of prominence in Bulgarian affairs. He is said to have coordinated partisan movements with those of pro-Soviet army units during the 9 September 1944 uprising.

== Rise to power ==
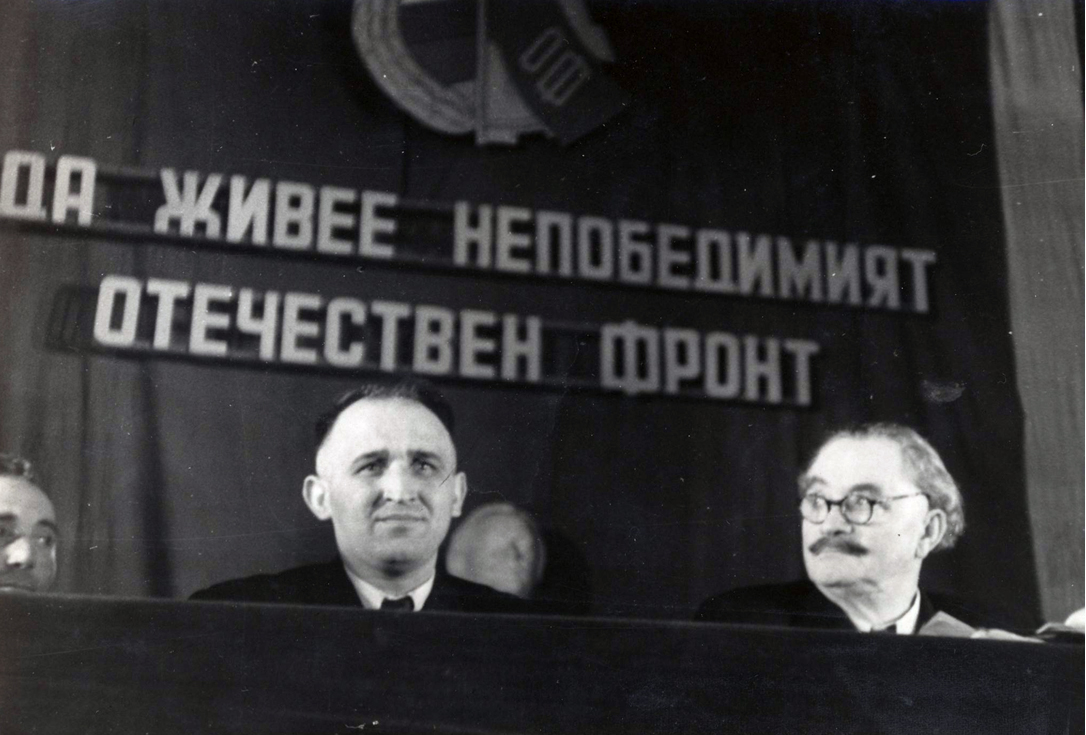
Todor Zhivkov and Georgi Dimitrov in a Fatherland Front congress in 1946

After 9 September 1944, Zhivkov became head of the Sofia police force, restyled as the Narodna Militsiya (People's Militia). He was elected to the BCP Central Committee as a candidate member in 1945 and a full member in 1948. In the run-up to the 1949 treason trial against Traicho Kostov, Zhivkov criticised the Party and judicial authorities for what he claimed was their leniency with regard to Kostov. This placed him in the Stalinist hardline wing of the Party. In 1950, Zhivkov became a candidate member of the BCP Politburo, then led by Valko Chervenkov, leading to a full membership in 1951. In the years which followed, he was involved in countering countryside resistance to forced farm collectivisation in north-western Bulgaria.

=== The April Plenum and Zhivkov's ascendancy ===
After Joseph Stalin's death, an emphasis on shared leadership emerged. When the hardline Stalinist Chervenkov gave up his post as General Secretary of the BCP in 1954, Zhivkov took his place, but Chervenkov retained most of his powers as prime minister. Bulgarian opinion at the time interpreted this as a self-preservation move by Chervenkov, since Zhivkov was a less well known figure in the party. After Nikita Khrushchev delivered his famous secret speech against Stalin at the Communist Party of the Soviet Union 20th Congress, a BCP Central Committee plenary meeting was convened in April 1956 to agree to adopt a new Krushchevite line. At that plenum, Zhivkov criticised Chervenkov as a disciple of Stalin, had him demoted from prime minister to a cabinet post, and promoted former Committee for State Security (CSS) head Anton Yugov to the post of prime minister. It was at this point that he became the de facto leader of Bulgaria. Subsequently, Zhivkov was associated with the "April Line", which had anti-Stalinist credentials. Chervenkov publicly accepted the criticism levied against him, admitted to allowing "mistakes" and "excesses" to take place in the country and resigned from political life.

=== The beginning of liberalisation ===
Subsequently, Zhivkov carried out a policy of relative sociopolitical liberalisation and de-Stalinization in Bulgaria, similar to the Khrushchev Thaw in the Soviet Union. Zhivkov took action against what he saw as a cults of personality – whether in relation to Stalin, Chervenkov or to other figures. Monuments considered as being part of such cults were taken down and many public places renamed – the most prominent of which were the return of "Mount Stalin" back to its prewar name of Mount Musala and that of the city of "Stalin" back to Varna. Zhivkov resented the idea of himself being the subject of a cult and later, when the residents of his hometown of Pravets erected a monument bearing his likeness – he personally thanked them for their gesture, before ordering the statue be removed. It would only be restored in 2001 – after Zhivkov had died.

Zhivkov discontinued many "excesses", removed monopolies on art and culture and vastly restrained, though not fully abolished, the practice of penal labour. Zhivkov would also pardon and rehabilitate many of those he viewed as unfairly sentenced by the People's Courts (which were already abolished by this point), such as renowned Bulgarian author Dimitar Talev – who subsequently had his author's union membership restored, would publish his most famous works and would even be elected as member of parliament to Bulgaria's National Assembly in 1966.

The April Plenum of the BCP endorsed Zhivkov's liberalisation, which was seen by many as a sign of deeper reform. Consequently, groups began openly petitioning Zhivkov for further increases in the freedom of the press, cultural freedoms and subsequently, even some open protests formed, petitioning Zhivkov to take action against local party leaders that the protesters were unhappy with. Zhivkov reacted by sacking and punishing those local and regional leaders whose policies had led to local dissatisfaction and unrest, instead beginning a program of promoting younger and more ambitious cadres to fill their roles. The promotion of these new cadres, unaffiliated with cliques and untainted by corruption, served to create a loyal following of local leaders and administrators for Zhivkov, further increasing his control of the Communist party, whilst simultaneously increasing popular support for his government.

At the 8th Congress of the BCP in late 1962, Zhivkov accused Yugov of anti-Party activity, expelled him from the BCP and had him placed under house arrest. Zhivkov became prime minister, once again merging the two most powerful offices in Bulgaria with full Kremlin approval.

=== Attempted coup ===
With the increasingly strengthening positions of Zhivkov as the country's and Communist party's leader, former partisan leaders and active military took a critical stance on what they viewed as the revisionist policies of Zhivkov's leadership. In the events described as the "April Conspiracy" of 1965 or the "Plot of Gorunia", general Ivan Todorov-Gorunya, general Tsvyatko Anev (Цвятко Анев) and Tsolo Krastev (Цоло Кръстев) organised a group of high-ranking military officers planning to overthrow the regime. Their plan was to establish a pro-Chinese leadership in the country, based on Stalinist-Maoist principles. The coup was exposed and between 28 March and 12 April 1965, most of the plotters were arrested and expelled from the party.

== Prime Minister (1962–1971) and Chairman of the State Council (1971–1989) ==
As prime minister, Zhivkov remained faithful to the Soviet Union, but adopted a more liberal stance than his predecessor by allowing some market reforms (such as allowing surplus agricultural goods to be sold for profit) and ending persecution of the Bulgarian Orthodox Church.

In the early 1970s, Zhivkov decided to update the country's Dimitrov Constitution, which led him to the creation of the so-called Zhivkov Constitution. The latter was intended to boost the country's image without risking any instability. The Zhivkov constitution separated party and state organs, empowering Bulgaria's National Assembly, giving the right of legislative initiative to labour unions and youth groups, as well as creating a collective head of state in the institution of the State Council, appointed by the National Assembly. The State Council took over some of the roles previously exercised by the country's communist party and had the ability to enact laws on behalf of the assembly when the latter was not in session. Zhivkov further wished to distance his country from the image of a one-party state, thus the Zhivkov constitution explicitly mentioned that political power in the country was to be shared "cooperatively" between the Communist Party and the Bulgarian Agrarian National Union, the communists' coalition partner.

The new constitution was approved by Bulgarian voters in the 1971 Bulgarian constitutional referendum. Subsequently, Zhivkov resigned from his post as prime minister and was instead made Chairman of the State Council, making him the titular head of the collective Bulgarian Presidency. In practice, though Bulgaria was now constitutionally at minimum a two-party state, the fact that the BANU was a minor coalition partner of Zhivkov's communist party allowed him to preside over a favourable national assembly, which could then approve of the State Council's decisions.

== Policies ==
=== Economic ===
In the mid-1950s, Soviet-style centralised planning produced economic indicators showing that Bulgarians were returning to their prewar lifestyle in some respects: real wages increased 75%, consumption of meat, fruit, and vegetables increased markedly, medical facilities and doctors became available to more of the population, and in 1957 collective farm workers benefited from the first agricultural pension and welfare system in Eastern Europe.

In 1959, the Communist Party borrowed from the Chinese Great Leap Forward to symbolise a sudden burst of economic activity to be injected into the Third Five-Year Plan (1958–1962), whose original scope was quite conservative. According to the revised plan, industrial production would double and agricultural production would triple by 1962; a new agricultural collectivisation and consolidation drive would achieve great economies of scale in that branch; investment in light industry would double, and foreign trade would expand. Following the Chinese model, all of Bulgarian society was to be propagandised and mobilised to meet the planning goals. Two purposes of the grandiose revised plan were to keep Bulgaria in step with the Soviet bloc, all of whose members were embarking on plans for accelerated growth, and to quell internal party conflicts. The amalgamation of collective farms cut their number by 70 per cent, after which average farm acreage was second only to the Soviet Union among countries in Eastern Europe. Zhivkov, whose "theses" had defined the goals of the plan, purged Politburo members and party rivals Boris Taskov (in 1959) and Anton Yugov (in 1962), citing their criticism of his policy as economically obstructionist. Already by 1960, however, Zhivkov had been forced to redefine the impossible goals of his theses. The lack of skilled labour and materials made it impossible to complete projects at the prescribed pace. Harvests were disastrously poor in the early 1960s; peasant unrest forced the government to raise food prices; and the urban dissatisfaction that resulted from higher prices compounded a crisis that broke in the summer of 1962. Blame fell on Zhivkov's experiments with decentralised planning, which was totally abandoned by 1963. Despite this, by 1960 the value produced by heavy industry matched that of light industry, and food processing for export grew rapidly. Throughout the second phase, budget expenditures consisted primarily of reinvestment in sectors given initial priority. The completion of collectivisation in 1958 had shifted 678,000 peasants, about 20 percent of the active labour force, into industrial jobs.

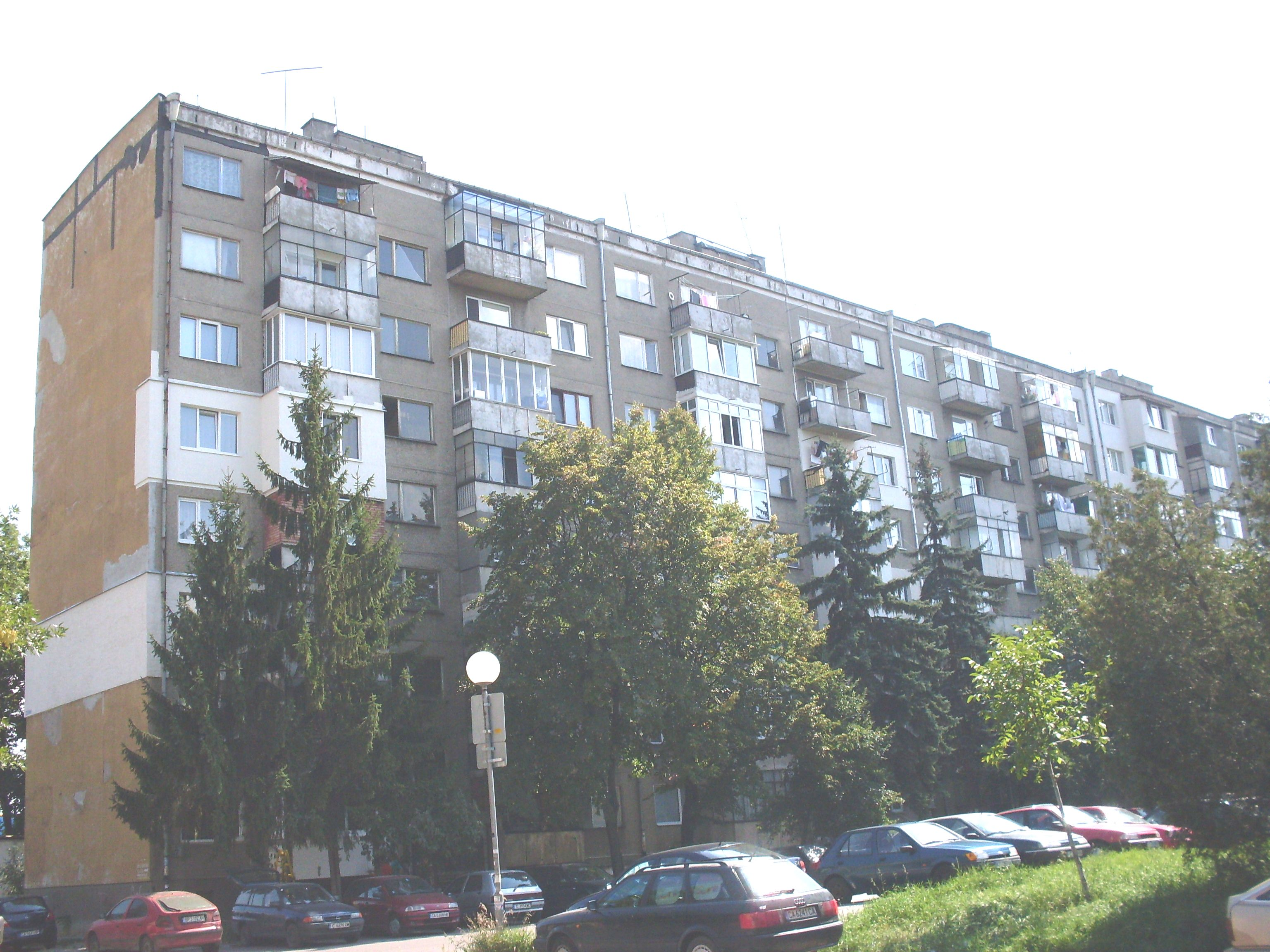
Large-scale industrialisation caused many labourers to move from rural to urban areas, which required the construction of numerous pre-fabricated apartment buildings such as this one in Sofia

By the early 1960s, however, changes to the system were obviously needed to achieve sustained growth in all branches of production, including agriculture. Corecom was established as a means to sell Western-made luxury goods to foreign tourists and Bulgarians who held special monetary certificates, thus acquiring Western hard currency – which had been in short supply as many Western governments did not allow the exchange of their currencies for their Eastern Bloc equivalents. Specific incentives to reform were shortages of labour and energy and the growing importance of foreign trade in the "thaw" years of the mid-1960s. Consequently, in 1962 the Fourth Five-Year Plan began an era of economic reform that brought a series of new approaches to the old goal of intensive growth. In industry, the "New System of Management" was introduced in 1964 and lasted until 1968. This approach intended to streamline economic units and make enterprise managers more responsible for performance. In June 1964, about fifty industrial enterprises, mostly producers of textiles and other consumer goods, were placed under the new system. Wages, bonuses, and investment funds were tied to enterprise profits, up to 70% of which could be retained. Outside investment funds were to come primarily from bank credit rather than the state budget. In 1965 state subsidies still accounted for 63% of enterprise investment funds; however, while 30% came from retained enterprise earnings and only 7% from bank credits. By 1970, budget subsidies accounted for only 27% of investment funds, while bank credits jumped to 39%, and retained enterprise earnings reached 34%. The pilot enterprises did very well, earning profits that were double the norm. By 1967, two-thirds of industrial production came from firms under the new system, which by that time had embraced areas outside consumer production.

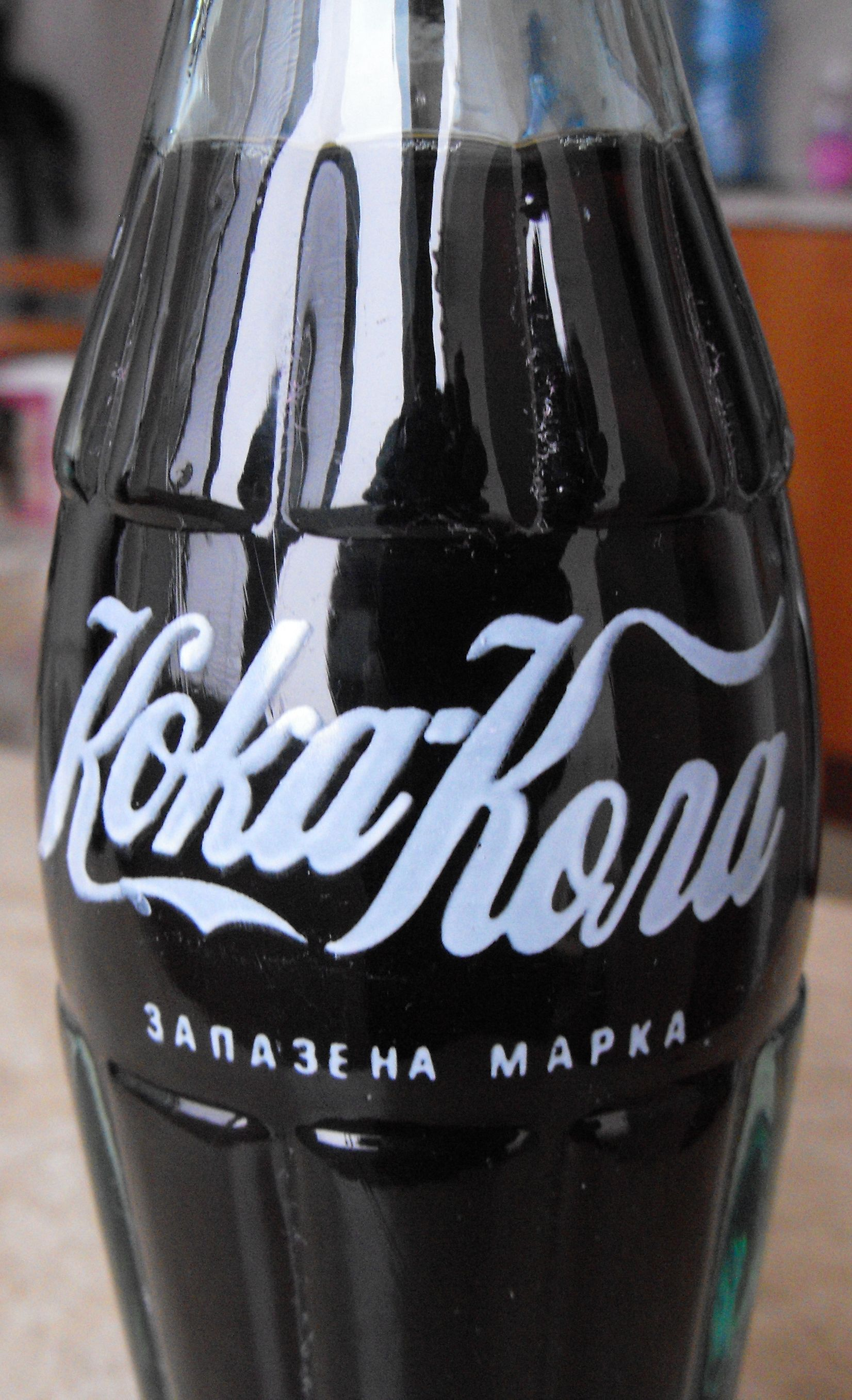
Zhivkov's reforms resulted in some expansion of trade with the West, as evidenced by licensed Coca-Cola production since the 1960s with a Cyrillic logo

Before the end of the 1960s, however, Bulgarian economic planning moved back toward the conventional CPE approach. Many Western analysts attributed the Bulgarian retreat from the reforms of the 1960s to tension caused by the Warsaw Pact invasion of Czechoslovakia in 1968. International events may well have played a role, but the timing of the retreat and the invasion suggest another component: dissatisfaction among the Party elite with the results and ideological implications of the reform. For example, in July 1968, one month before the invasion of Czechoslovakia, Bulgaria's unorthodox, three-tiered pricing system was eliminated. The party leadership had never accepted the concept of free and flexible pricing for some products, which was an important Bulgarian departure from centralised planning in the 1960s. Resistance to reform was further encouraged by a series of cases in which major enterprise directors used newly decentralised financial resources to line their own pockets. However, some of the recentralisation measures, such as the creation of an agricultural-industrial complex, also received domestic criticism.

After a relative stagnation in the 1970s, the New Economic Model (NEM), instituted in 1981 as the latest economic reform program, seemingly improved the supply of consumer goods and generally upgraded the economy. In an effort to remedy the chronic distribution problems of the central economy, higher economic institutions became financially accountable for damage inflicted by their decisions on subordinate levels. Complexes or associations were given explicit freedom to sign their own contracts with suppliers and customers at home and abroad. However, NEM was unable to drastically improve the quality or quantity of Bulgarian goods and produce. In 1983, Zhivkov harshly criticised all of Bulgarian industry and agriculture in a major speech, but the reforms generated by his speech did nothing to improve the situation. A large percentage of high-quality domestic goods were shipped abroad in the early 1980s to shrink Bulgaria's hard-currency debt, and the purchase of Western technology was sacrificed for the same reason, crippling technical advancement and disillusioning consumers. The NEM proved to be a failure, and GNP growth between 1981 and 1982 was only 2.9%. By 1984, Bulgaria was suffering a serious energy shortage because its Soviet-made nuclear power plant was unreliable and droughts reduced the productivity of hydroelectric plants. Bulgaria marked significant progress in scientific research by sending two men into space and supplying 70% of all electronics in the Eastern Bloc.

In 1985, Soviet leader Mikhail Gorbachev visited Bulgaria and reportedly pressured Zhivkov to make the country more competitive economically. This led to a Bulgarian version of the Soviet perestroika program. After a round of failed experimental measures, in January 1989 the Party issued Decree Number 56. This decree established "firms" as the primary unit of economic management. In a fundamental departure from the socialist prohibition of private citizens hiring labour, as many as ten people could now be hired permanently, and an unlimited number could be hired on temporary contracts. This last round of reforms by the Zhivkov regime confused rather than improved economic performance. However, statistics on growth for 1986–88 still indicated a 5.5% annual rate, up from the 3.7% rate achieved during the previous five-year plan.

=== Social ===
Zhivkov's social policies resulted in Bulgaria having a Gini coefficient of 18 in the 1970s, ranking among the countries with the lowest levels of income inequality in the world

Even before Zhivkov, Bulgaria made significant progress in increasing life expectancy and decreasing infant mortality rates. Consistent social policies led to an increase in life expectancy to 68.1 years for men and 74.4 years for women. In 1939, the mortality rate for children under one year had been 138.9 per 1,000; by 1986 it was 18.2 per 1,000, and in 1990 it was 14 per 1,000, the lowest rate in Eastern Europe. The proportion of long-lived people in Bulgaria was quite large; a 1988 study cited a figure of 52 centenarians per 1 million inhabitants. One of the first mass HIV-testing programs was initiated under Zhivkov, and as of October 1989, some 2.5 million people in Bulgaria, including about 66,000 foreigners, had been tested for HIV, and 81 Bulgarians were diagnosed as HIV positive. Increases in real incomes in agriculture rose by 6.7 per cent per year during the 1960s. During this same period, industrial wages increased by 4.9 per cent annually. Availability of consumer durables significantly improved in the 1970s. According to official statistics, between 1965 and 1988 the number of televisions per 100 households increased from 8 to 100; radios increased from 59 to 95; refrigerators from 5 to 96; washing machines from 23 to 96; and automobiles from 2 to 40. Available automobiles were primarily Soviet Fiats, some of which were manufactured in Bulgaria.

In the postwar era, and especially under Zhivkov, housing in Bulgaria improved significantly as more and better-quality homes were built. However, many of them were cramped – the average home in Bulgaria had three rooms and an area of 65 square metres (700 sq ft). Housing remained one of the most serious shortcomings in the Bulgarian standard of living throughout Zhivkov's rule. Residential construction targets in the Five-Year Plans were regularly underfulfilled. Consequently, families often waited several years for apartments; in Sofia, where overcrowding was at its worst, the wait was as long as ten years. A system of distribution was implemented, which gave priority to 'Active Fighters against Fascism' (those who had been part of the partisan struggle or fought against Nazi Germany in World War II), as well as eminent artists, scientists and "Heroes of Socialist Labour" (mostly collective farmers and shop-floor workers).

The educational system, despite the addition of ideological subjects, remained relatively unchanged after the beginning of the Communist era. In 1979, Zhivkov introduced a sweeping educational reform, claiming that Marxist teachings on educating youth were still not being applied completely. Zhivkov therefore created Unified Secondary Polytechnical Schools (Edinni sredni politekhnicheski uchilishta, ESPU), in which all students would receive the same general education. The system united previously separate specialised middle schools in a single, twelve-grade program heavily emphasising technical subjects. In 1981, a national program introduced computers to most of the ESPUs.

=== Foreign ===
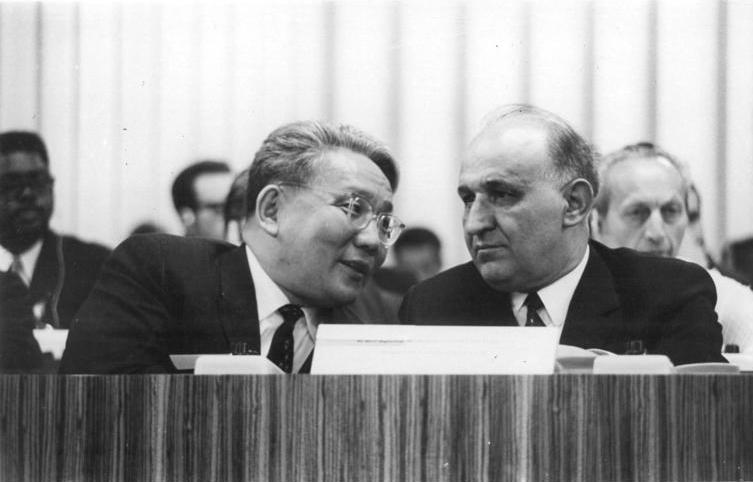
Mongolian leader Yumjaagiin Tsedenbal speaking with Zhivkov during a conference in East Berlin, June 1971

Although the Zhivkov regime often advocated closer relations and multilateral cooperation with Yugoslavia, Turkey, Greece, Albania, and Romania, a number of traditional issues barred significant improvement until the late 1980s. Without exception, Zhivkov imitated or supported Soviet twists and turns such as Khrushchev's denunciation of Stalin in 1956 and the invasion of Czechoslovakia in 1968. Substantial historical and economic ties supplemented the ideological foundation of the relationship. In the 1970s and 1980s, Bulgaria improved its diplomatic relations with nations outside the Soviet sphere. The 1970s were a period of closeness between Brezhnev's USSR and Zhivkov's Bulgaria. In 1977, Zhivkov was also awarded the Hero of the Soviet Union. Yet, though Bulgarian émigré dissident Georgi Markov wrote that "[Zhivkov] served the Soviet Union more ardently than the Soviet leaders themselves did", in many ways he can be said to have exploited the USSR for political purposes, with Bulgaria serving as a buffer between the USSR and NATO. Thus, he claims in his memoirs that the USSR had become "a raw material appendage to Bulgaria", something obliquely confirmed by Gorbachev when he wrote in his memoirs that "Bulgaria was a country which had lived beyond its means for a long time." An example of how the "raw material appendage" was exploited was the trade in Soviet crude oil. This would be shipped to Bulgaria's modern refinery in Burgas at subsidised prices, processed, and resold on world markets at a huge premium.

In 1963 and 1973, the Zhivkov regime made requests – it is unclear how far these were in earnest – that Bulgaria be incorporated into the USSR, both times because the Bulgarian government, having engaged in bitter polemics with Yugoslavia over the Macedonia naming dispute, feared a Soviet–Yugoslav reconciliation at its own expense. In 1963, following the decision of Patriarch Alexy I of Moscow to recognise the autonomy of the Macedonian Orthodox Church, the Bulgarian leaders openly declared that there was no "historic Macedonian nation". In the face of Moscow's post-1953 efforts to reach out to Belgrade and Athens, Zhivkov seems to have calculated that a policy of unswerving loyalty to the Kremlin would ensure that it remained more valuable for the USSR than non-aligned Yugoslavia or NATO-affiliated Greece. In 1967, he severed diplomatic ties with Israel.

Throughout the 1960s and 1970s, Bulgaria gave official military support to many national liberation causes, most notably in North Vietnam, Indonesia, Libya, Angola, Afghanistan, the Horn of Africa, and the Middle East. In 1984, the 9,000 Bulgarian advisers stationed in Libya for military and non-military aid put that country in first place among Bulgaria's Third World clients. Through its Kintex arms export enterprise, Bulgaria also engaged in covert military support activities, many of which were subsequently disclosed. In the 1970s, diplomatic crises with Sudan and Egypt were triggered by Bulgarian involvement in coup plots.

Under Zhivkov, Bulgaria's policy toward Western Europe and the United States was determined largely by the position of the Soviet Union. Events such as the invasions of Czechoslovakia and Afghanistan automatically distanced Bulgaria from the West; then, in the early 1980s, Soviet efforts to split NATO by cultivating Western Europe brought Bulgaria closer to France and West Germany – a position that continued through the 1980s. Even in the 1970s, Zhivkov actively pursued better relations with the West, overcoming conservative opposition and the tentative, tourism-based approach to the West taken as early as the 1960s. Emulating Soviet détente policy of the 1970s, Bulgaria gained Western technology, expanded cultural contacts, and attracted Western investments with the most liberal foreign investment policy in Eastern Europe. As in 1956 and 1968, however, Soviet actions altered Bulgaria's position. The Soviet invasion of Afghanistan in late 1979, which Bulgaria supported vigorously, renewed tension between Bulgaria and the West. Alleged Bulgarian implication in the attempted assassination of Pope John Paul II in 1981 exacerbated the problem and kept relations cool through the early 1980s. A 1988 application for membership in the General Agreement on Tariffs and Trade was refused because of the Turkish assimilation program, after widespread expectations of success.

Bulgarian relations with Greece, a traditional enemy, were stable throughout the 1970s and 1980s, in spite of major government changes in both countries. Zhivkov made this stability a model for the overall Balkan cooperation that was a centrepiece of his foreign policy in the 1980s. In 1986 the two countries signed a declaration of good-neighbourliness, friendship, and cooperation that was based on mutual enmity toward Turkey and toward Yugoslav demands for recognition of Macedonian minorities in Bulgaria and Greece. An important motivation for friendship with Greece was to exploit NATO's Greek-Turkish split, which was based on the claims of the two countries in Cyprus. In early 1989, Bulgaria signed a ten-year bilateral economic agreement with Greece.

In late summer 1988, Zhivkov was visited by a Bavarian delegation headed by Franz Josef Strauss. During the course of their visit, Zhivkov had apparently asked Strauss for ideas on how he could reform and modernise Bulgaria's economic system. Strauss expressed pessimism about the idea, telling him that, in his opinion, the system could not be reformed, only replaced. Zhivkov then asked what Bulgaria had to do in order to potentially join the European Economic Community (EEC), which Strauss initially thought was a misinterpretation, asking Zhivkov whether he meant closer cooperation between Bulgaria and Bavaria. Zhivkov reiterated that he was asking about a potential membership of Bulgaria in the EEC, much to the Bavarian leader's surprise. This event did not have any lasting political consequences, as Strauss died only a week after the end of his visit, before any real discussion on the topic could be made.

=== Cultural ===
Until the late 1980s, Zhivkov successfully prevented unrest in the Bulgarian intellectual community. Membership in the writers' union brought enormous privilege and social stature, and that drew many dissident writers such as Georgi Dzhagarov and Lyubomir Levchev into the circle of the officially approved intelligentsia. On the other hand, entry required intellectual compromise, and refusal to compromise led to dismissal from the union and loss of all privileges. Markov tells a story of how Zhivkov reproached a popular newspaper cartoonist for modifying his signature to resemble a pig's tail, yet did not persecute him. A handful of satirist dissidents such as Radoy Ralin enjoyed some prominence during Zhivkov's tenure, although Ralin was not favoured by the authorities due to his sharp satire.

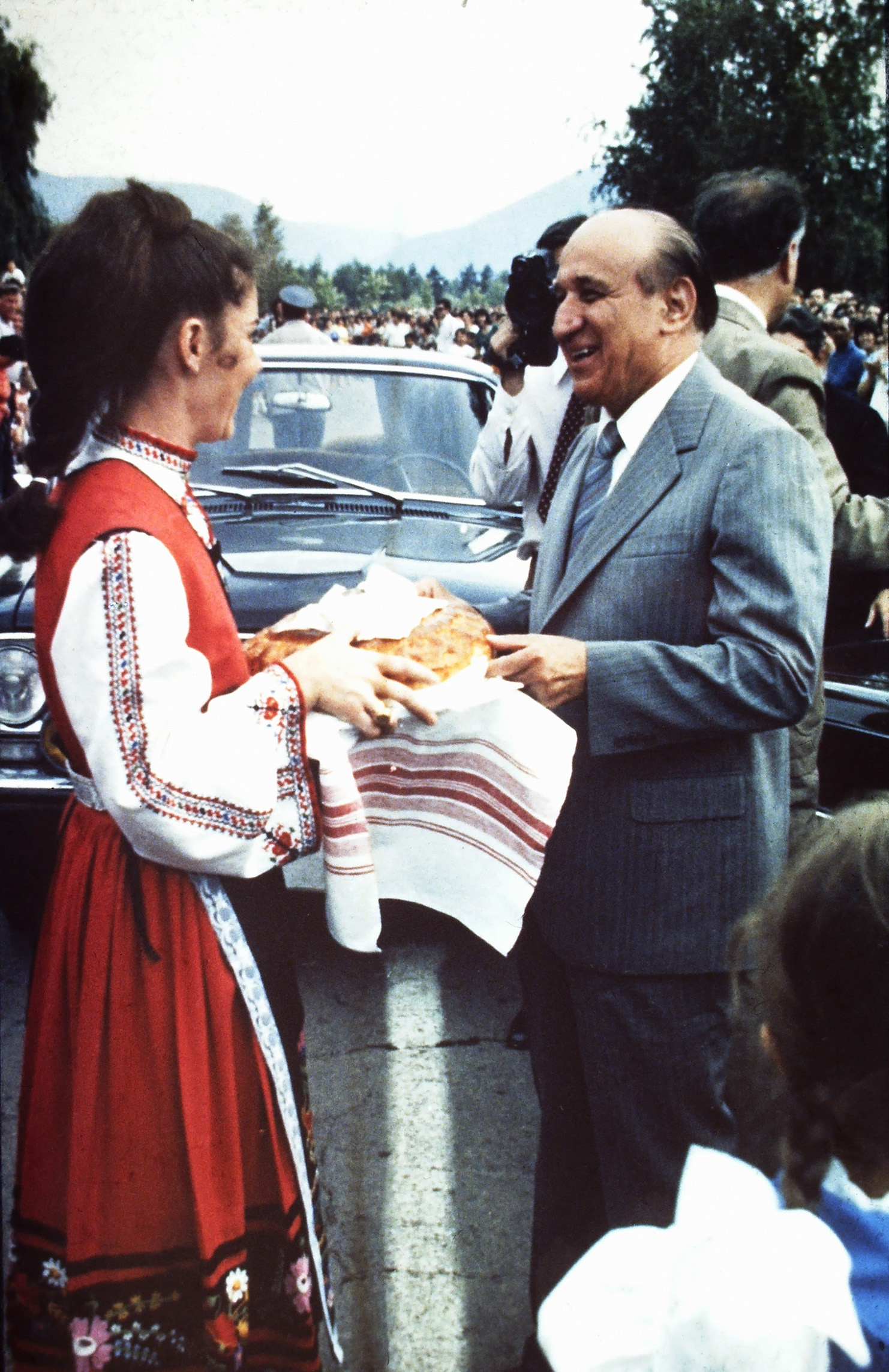
Todor Zhivkov being welcomed with bread and salt at the opening of the new Plastchim factory in Botevgrad, circa 1980

Zhivkov also softened the organised opposition by restoring symbols of the Bulgarian cultural past that had been cast aside in the postwar campaign to consolidate Soviet-style party control. Beginning in 1967, he appealed loudly to the people to remember "our motherland Bulgaria". In the late 1970s, Zhivkov mended relations with the Bulgarian Orthodox Church. Zhivkov's extensive campaign of cultural restoration provided at least some common ground between him and the Bulgarian intelligentsia. In 1980, Zhivkov had improved his domestic position by appointing his daughter, Lyudmila Zhivkova, as chair of the commission on science, culture, and art. In this powerful position, Zhivkova became extremely popular by promoting Bulgaria's separate national cultural heritage. She spent large sums of money in a highly visible campaign to support scholars, collect Bulgarian art, and sponsor cultural institutions. Among her policies was closer cultural contact with the West; her most visible project was the spectacular national celebration of Bulgaria's 1,300th anniversary in 1981. When Zhivkova died in 1981, relations with the West had already been chilled by the Afghanistan issue, but her brief administration of Bulgaria's official cultural life was a successful phase of her father's appeal to Bulgarian national tradition to unite the country.

Sports also prospered during Zhivkov's rule. From 1956 to 1988, Bulgaria won an unprecedented 153 Olympic medals and numerous European and world competitions in sports as diverse as volleyball, rhythmic gymnastics, and wrestling.

== Controversy ==
Despite the thaw period he initiated, dissidents could still be punished under Zhivkov's rule. The CSS was a feared tool of control, and overt opposition largely stayed underground until the late 1980s. Blaga Dimitrova was harshly denounced for her critical portrayal of party officials in her 1982 novel Litse.

Much like in many other Eastern European countries at the time, Bulgarians needed exit visas to travel abroad.

When Mikhail Gorbachev announced his reform program, Zhivkov made a show of copying it, believing that Gorbachev was not really serious about glasnost or perestroika. However, he showed his true colours when he expelled several members of a human-rights watch group from the Party. Soon afterward, when several intellectuals announced the formation of the "Club for the Support of Perestroika and Glasnost", he arrested the leaders and expelled them from the Party.

== Character ==
Throughout his tenure, Zhivkov's dialect and poor manners made him the butt of many acerbic jibes and jokes in Bulgaria's urbane circles. While the feared CSS secret police was commonly said to persecute those who told political jokes, Zhivkov himself was said to have found them amusing and collected an archive of them. His popular nickname was "bai Tosho" (approximately "Ol' Uncle Tosho") or occasionally (and later) "Tato" (a dialectal word for "Dad" or "Pop").

== Fall ==
Changes to the country's national emblem during Zhivkov's tenure, showing an increase in the prominence of patriotic symbols, such as the addition of the year of the founding of the First Bulgarian Empire by Khan Asparukh (681)

Zhivkov had long since benefited from restoring and promoting Bulgarian national symbols, such as those on the country's national emblem, thus creating a sort of patriotic national communism, which proved to increase Zhivkov's popularity. This, alongside the Turkish invasion of Cyprus, done ostensibly in order to protect the interests of Turkish Cypriots in 1974, alongside a fear of the militarist, anti-communist regime brought to power in Turkey by the 1980 Turkish coup d'état, caused both Zhivkov and the establishment to fear a similar scenario repeating in Bulgaria. To this end, Zhivkov attempted to counter this perceived threat by attempting to trigger a second Bulgarian National Revival through a series of policies collectively alluded to as the "Revival Process". The most controversial of these was a decision taken in December 1984 that aimed to assimilate the Bulgarian Turks through the "restoration" of "Turkish" to "Bulgarian" names. Though official statements attempted to portray this as a campaign of unity and the destruction of inter-ethnic barriers, it was met with strong resistance among several groups of Bulgarian Turks, who viewed it as an attack on their identity. The first demonstration against the "revival process" took place on 24 December, when 1200 people peacefully protested in the village of Mlechino without incident. However, the protests turned violent the day after, as the local chief of police alleged that the demonstrators had started throwing stones at both the police and local fire brigade, which led to an attempt by the authorities to disperse the protests via a water cannon. Several more incidents occurred between protesting crowds and the local police during the following few days.

In early January the following year, an organised ethnic Turkish opposition to the "revival process" was established, acting as an honoured "fighter against fascism and capitalism", with a local mayor and a communist party secretary joined forces to petition the government to end the campaign. Eventually, militant anti-government groups were formed in one village; when local government officials came to negotiate with the protesters, they were taken prisoner by the groups, while their members subsequently cut off all communication between the village and the outside world. The next day, another group of local officials arrived in the village, this time escorted by a large detachment of armed policemen. They were met by the armed groups, which targeted them with Molotov cocktails and improvised armaments, forcing them to retreat. The armed groups then detonated bombs in order to demolish the local bridges and set up barricades along the roads. On 19 January, the village was surrounded by government tanks, APCs, fire trucks, and police vehicles. The armed groups responded by first sending out their wives, who were hanging onto fake babies, while they stood behind them armed. Upon figuring out this ruse, the police arrested the group's main negotiator and stormed the village through the use of tear gas and water cannons. After a quick fight, the armed groups were subdued and beaten, while one of their members was accidentally killed after falling in front of a moving tank.

The name-changing campaign ended just a month after it began, but the "Revival process" persisted. Some of the militant groups openly resorted to terrorism, setting off several bombs – in the Varna Airport parking lot, Plovdiv's main railway station, inside a civilian passenger train near Bunovo (the bomb was programmed to detonate whilst inside a tunnel in order to maximise casualties, but the train had run two minutes late and it detonated while it was near the railway station instead) and inside a hotel in Sliven, leading to several deaths and many injuries. The CSS would report uncovering a total of 42 illegal pro-Turkish groups and foiling several more terror plots. In total, 517 people were sent to prisons for their roles in the uprisings, riots, terrorist attacks, and other "revival process"-related events between 1984 and 1989. In May 1989, Zhivkov declared that all persons who felt not at home in Bulgaria would be free to leave the country to go live in Turkey. Zhivkov underestimated the opposition he had generated within the ranks of the Bulgarian Turks, and over 360,000 people left the country, some of whom reportedly felt as though they had few other options. The campaign was an abject failure and generally considered to be Zhivkov's biggest mistake. The GERB-majority National Assembly passed a non-binding resolution in 2012, in which it condemned the revival process, dubbing it "a form of ethnic cleansing carried out by a totalitarian regime."

As it turned out, this was the beginning of the end for the long-time leader. Bulgaria was the target of near-unanimous condemnation from the international community; even the Soviets protested. Gorbachev already did not think much of Zhivkov; he regarded Zhivkov as one of a group of inflexible hardliners that included East Germany's Erich Honecker, Czechoslovakia's Gustáv Husák and Romania's Nicolae Ceaușescu. However, after the Turkish episode, he was determined to see Zhivkov gone. The Turkish affair alarmed several high-ranking Bulgarian officials as well, including Prime Minister Georgi Atanasov, Foreign Minister Petar Mladenov and Finance Minister Andrey Lukanov. They began plotting to remove him, but had to move discreetly given the ubiquity of the CSS.

In October 1989, Mladenov organised a CSCE environmental summit in Sofia. He invited an independent group of Bulgarian environmental activists, Ecoglasnost, to participate. Ten days into the conference, several Ecoglasnost activists and supporters were brutally beaten up by CSS and militia officers—on orders from Zhivkov. They then corralled 36 other opposition activists, drove them to the countryside, and forced them to walk back to Sofia. Amid near-unanimous international condemnation, Mladenov, Lukanov and Atanasov decided that Zhivkov had to go. In a critical step, they convinced Defence Minister Dobri Dzhurov to support them.

The plotters struck on 9 November, a day before a Politburo meeting. Dzhurov met with Zhivkov in private and informed him he was expected to resign, emphasizing that there was sufficient support on the Politburo to vote him out. Zhivkov was taken by surprise and tried to marshal support, to no avail. Just before the meeting the next day, Dzhurov gave Zhivkov an ultimatum – unless he stepped down, the Politburo would not only vote to remove him, but have him executed. Seeing the writing on the wall after the motion calling for his removal passed, Zhivkov resigned, officially for reasons of age and health. Mladenov was elected his successor. On 17 November, the National Assembly removed him from the post of Chairman of the State Council, and replaced him with Mladenov.

On 11 December, only a month after Zhivkov's ousting, Mladenov called for the Communist Party to give up its guaranteed right to rule. The Central Committee fell into line two days later, calling for free elections in the spring and asking the National Assembly to delete the portions of the Constitution that enshrined the party's "leading role". On 15 January, the National Assembly struck out the portions of the constitution giving the Communist Party a monopoly of power. Thus, within only two months of Zhivkov losing power, the Communist system he had helped to create, and which he had dominated for 35 years, was no more.

While he was initially shown reverence in public upon removal, that had changed by 17 November, when he was sharply criticised in parliament. On 13 December, Zhivkov was expelled from the party for what Lukanov described as "gross violations of laws and gross mistakes in politics". Mladenov contended that Zhivkov's stewardship had left the country in "a near heart-attack condition". The party also began an investigation into what it considered Zhivkov's "high living".

== Trial and acquittal ==
Summary of the indictments against Zhivkov and their results
Indictment	Ruling	Verdict
1 – 'Revival Process'	Case dismissed	Innocent of crimes against minorities; revival process not proven to be a crime; case reviewed multiple times
2 – Overstepping authority in funding "leftist workers' organizations" ("Moscow Fund")	Case dismissed	No crime could be proven
3 – Giving high-risk loans and development aid to developing countries	Case dismissed	No crime could be proven
4 – Misappropriation of public funds, cars and apartments given to members of security services	Innocent (Note: Zhivkov was initially found guilty and sentenced to 7 years in prison. His sentence was subsequently reduced to 1 year and 8 months and finally overturned by the Supreme Court, which ruled him innocent.)	Innocent on all counts
5 – Human rights violations	Innocent	Innocent on all counts

Following his fall from power, the new regime brought Zhivkov to five separate trials – labelled trials No.1 through No. 5 of the Republic of Bulgaria, each with their own indictment. Indictment No. 1 regarded the 'Revival Process', Indictment 2 accused him of overstepping his authority in "funding the international communist movement", Indictment 3 accused him and 21 others of giving out high-risk loans to developing countries, Indictment 4 accused him of giving away apartments and cars worth a total of around $24 million (in 1990 dollars) to members of the security forces and indictment 5 accused him of involvement in labour camps. The first four were brought before the court immediately, while indictment 5 was brought before the court later.

Zhivkov pled not guilty to all counts on all indictments, but was initially found guilty of one of the four indictments at that point, Indictment 4, and was subsequently sentenced to seven years in prison. He disputed the court's verdict and appealed it. An appellate court found "oddities" in the original verdict and decided to confirm it, but lowered his sentence to just 1 year and 6 months.

The chairman of the court stated that if Zhivkov was still unsatisfied with his verdict, he could only appeal to then-President Zhelyu Zhelev for a pardon. Zhivkov adamantly refused to ask for a pardon and stated that even if given one he would not accept it, as he opined that pardons are only given to guilty people and he did not consider himself guilty.

On 8 June 1993 he was found innocent on indictment 5.

In 1994 his sentence in Trial 4 went into effect, but was substituted by house arrest due to his ill health.

Zhivkov continued to assert his innocence and on 15 September 1995, the Supreme Court of Bulgaria agreed to hear his plea and reconsidered his verdict. Zhivkov threatened to go to the European Court of Human Rights if not found innocent, accusing Bulgarian courts of accepting political orders.

General Prosecutor Evtim Stoimenov declared that the prosecution had been "under strong pressure" to find Zhivkov guilty of something and that a 1971 document proved his innocence in regards to Indictment 4. He subsequently resigned from his post and was replaced by Martin Gunev.

On 9 February 1996 the Bulgarian Supreme Court recognised Zhivkov as a former head of state and ruled that the prosecution had not presented evidence for Zhivkov's guilt, reversing the verdict on Indictment 4 and declaring him innocent on all charges.

A month after Zhivkov's death, one of the main prosecutors, Krasimir Zhekov, resigned from his position, citing his inability to get Zhivkov convicted of anything. He left Sofia and moved to Pazardzhik, where he lived with a low state pension until his death in 2013.

The Porcupine, a fictional account of the trial of Stoyo Petkanov, a barely disguised Zhivkov, was written by Julian Barnes and published in Bulgarian and English in 1992.

== Later life and death ==
Zhivkov was subsequently released, giving frequent interviews to foreign journalists and writing his memoirs in the final years of his life.

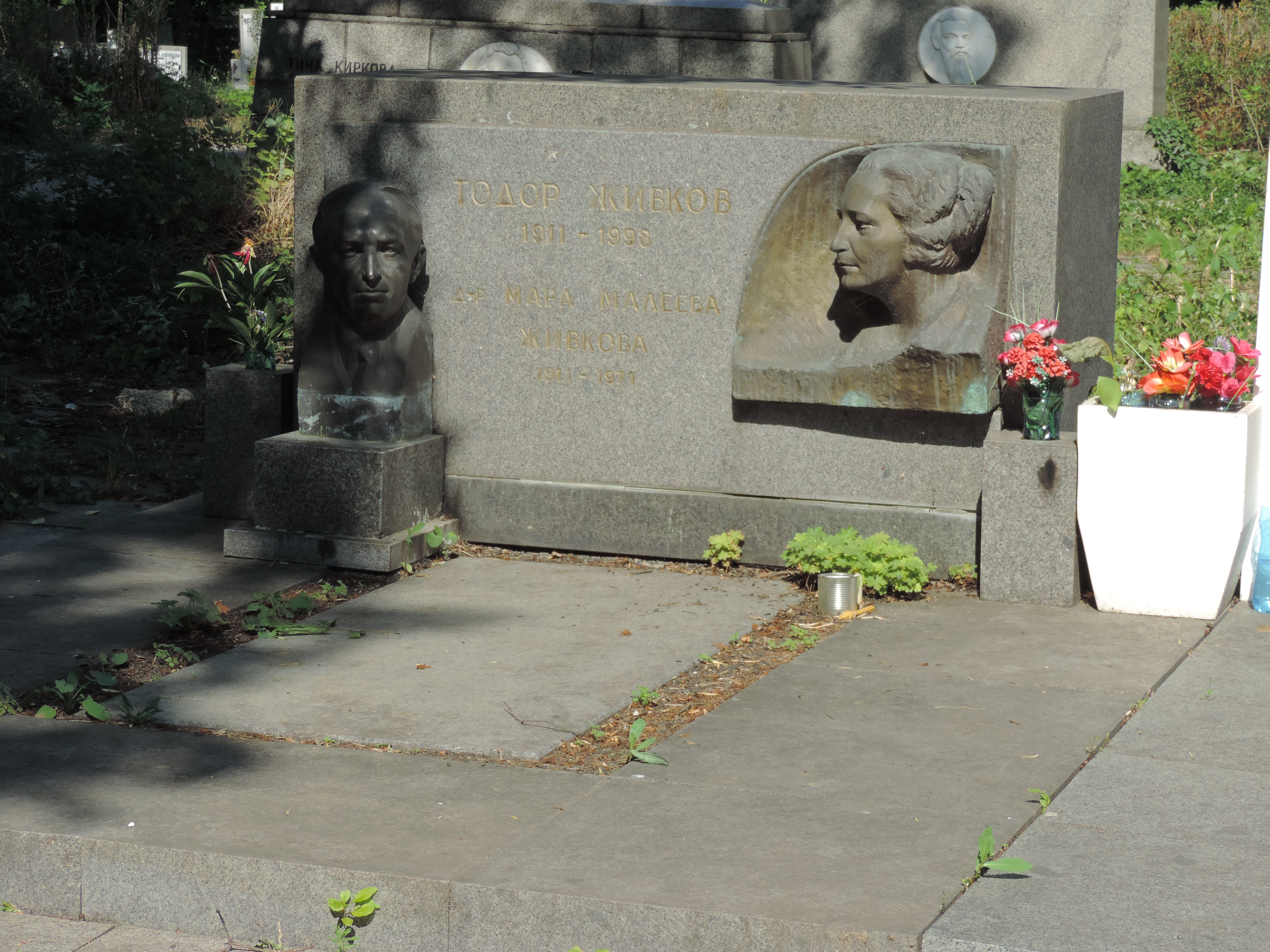
Grave of Zhivkov in the Central Sofia Cemetery

In his memoirs, which he dubbed "the longest confession of his life", he defined himself as an "ordinary village boy from Pravets" and told the story of his life, along with his analysis of his own government and legacy. He spoke of the socialist society in Bulgaria as being divided into two parts – the [societal] order, which he described as the basic societal organisation and ethos in country and the system, the practical structure of government, led by a Vanguard party. He spoke positively of the first, describing it as proper, justified and prosperous. He blamed the collapse of socialism, instead, on the latter. He stated that he had not changed his political views and remained a committed Marxist, but had come to realise that the system was overly bureaucratic, inflexible and ultimately failed, bringing the order down with it. He concluded that the ultimate collapse of his system was due to his own failures to reform and modernise said system in the 1970s and 80s. He opined that socialism would ultimately triumph regardless, but that this would be a new form of socialism and would be led by a new, younger generation, which he hoped would be "better in every way from ours" and would lead to a "more prosperous, more just and more democratic Bulgaria". He criticised the ruling right-wing UDF government at the time, but reserved his harshest criticism for the former members of his party that had taken part in embezzlement of state assets following his departure.

In his final interview, conducted before the Bulgarian National Television in 1997, he took more issue with some of his former party members, than the ruling right-wing UDF party at the time. He strongly criticised Andrey Lukanov and Petar Mladenov, the former communists turned social democrats that ruled Bulgaria in the immediate aftermath of his resignation. He blamed them for betraying their values and for leading the country into economic ruin and expressed his unwillingness to both re-join his former party and to join the communist splinter party. He maintained that he still believed in socialism, but added that he had made friends with many people across many parties, including the UDF. He defended most of his actions while in power and explained his reasoning behind several of his policies, but reiterated his belief that "the order was good, but the system which ruled it was bad".

In early 1998, a shifting power balance within the Bulgarian Socialist Party led to Zhivkov re-joining it, leading to a round of ovation by party members during a rally.

Zhivkov died from complications of bronchial pneumonia as a free man on 5 August 1998, at the age of 86. With his death, all attempts of the prosecution to reintroduce the dismissed cases were dropped.

The UDF-led government refused petitions from Zhivkov's family and the Socialist Party to have him buried in a state funeral due to his status as a former head of state. He was buried after a large privately run procession, organised by the local Socialist Party branch.

== Aftermath and legacy ==
=== Image and approval ratings ===
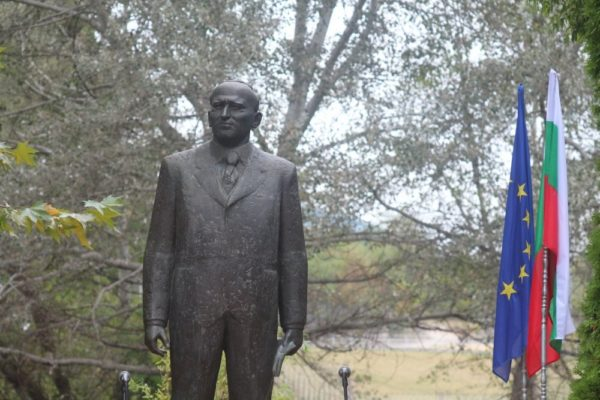
Flags of the European Union and Bulgaria next to a statue of Zhivkov at the celebrations of his 105th birthday in his native Pravets, 2016

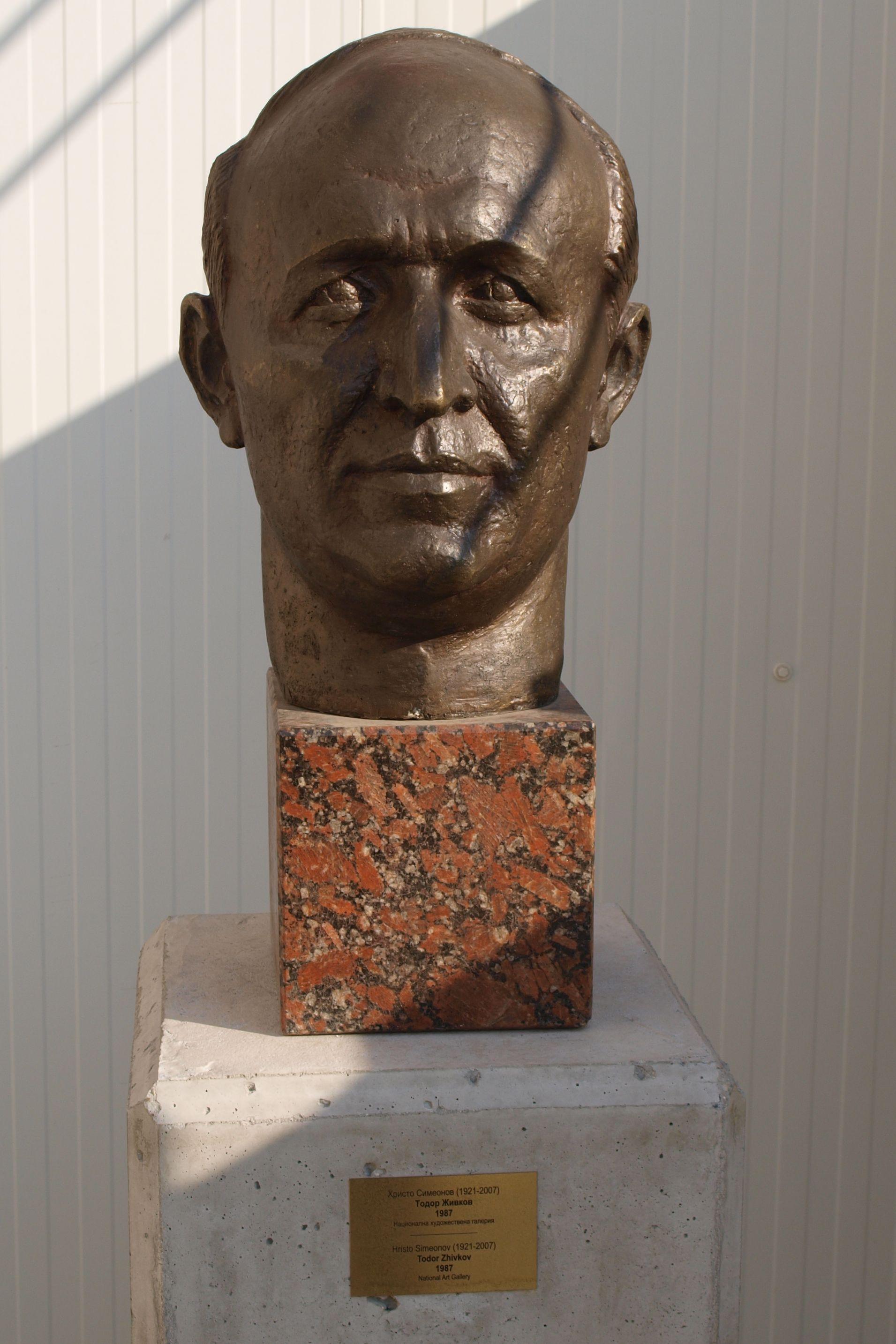
Bust of Zhivkov from the NRB era, now located in the Museum of Socialist Art in Sofia

Years and even decades after his death, his legacy is continued in Bulgarian pop culture, with songs, shirts and various souvenirs featuring him or his likeness being easy to find in modern-day Bulgaria. A billboard posthumously celebrating his 100th birthday was erected in Nesebar in 2011, while portraits, posters and calendars bearing his image are still commonly found in the country, with several mayors and other officials being reported as placing them up or handing them out regularly. Obituaries were placed around the town of Smolyan 21 years after his death in 2019, comparing him to a star and Bulgarian national hero Hristo Botev.

In 2001, the communist-period monument of Zhivkov was re-erected in his hometown of Pravets in the presence of the leaders of the Bulgarian Socialist Party, alongside Zhivkov's 1990–1998 bodyguard, Boyko Borisov, future Bulgarian Prime Minister, who then was the Chief Secretary of the Bulgarian Ministry of Interior. His former home in the town was then turned into a museum in his honour in 2002. Subsequently, the annual celebrations of the anniversary of Zhivkov's birthday on 7 September, gradually developed into a state-wide affair. Beginning in 2012, the celebrations have been incongruously accompanied by the flag of Europe. A second monument of Zhivkov was erected in the village of Odurne in 2013 by the local mayor, who had promised its sculpting as part of his electoral program.

In modern times, Zhivkov is regarded as popular and his government widely viewed with nostalgia from many sectors of Bulgarian society. Sociological surveys have found that the average approval of Todor Zhivkov in the 2010s ranged from 41% to 55%, while disapproval ranged from 18% to 25%. A study published by RC Trend pegged Zhivkov as one of the top 5 most approved of Bulgarian politicians of all time, alongside former prime ministers Petko Karavelov, Stefan Stambolov and Aleksandar Stamboliyski, while another by Gallup International Association found that 74% of Bulgarians believe the country to have been "ruined" by the politicians that took power after his resignation, most prominently blaming UDF leader Ivan Kostov (49% of respondents). Half of all respondents which gave an answer in the RC Trend study also expressed a desire to go back in time, so that they would live during 'Zhivkov's time', rather than continue living in the modern day republic.

In 2019, the history textbooks of five major academic publishers in Bulgaria had described Zhivkov as a 'moderate ruler, whose policies were aimed at improving the welfare of the ordinary people' – drawing condemnation from a faculty member at the American University in Bulgaria and an investigative journalist. The growing academic nostalgia for Zhivkov's rule was not appreciated by Bulgaria's ruling centre-right GERB party and in particular the education minister Krasimir Valchev – who ordered the textbooks changed to condemn what he dubbed "bloody communism". Valchev's order was opposed by the Bulgarian Socialist Party, which accused him of historical revisionism, political interference in education and an undemocratic enforcement of a particular worldview.

Popular perceptions of Todor Zhivkov among Bulgarian citizens
Year	Positive	Neutral	Negative	No opinion/Don't know	Source
2014	55%	20%	25%	-	Alpha Research
2017	41%	33%	18%	8%	RC Trend
2019	45%	-	22%	33%	Gallup

Popular perceptions of Bulgarian citizens for the period following his resignation
Statement	Agree	Neutral	Disagree	No opinion/Don't know	Source
Bulgaria is developing well following Zhivkov's resignation	10%	21%	50%	30%	Alpha Research
Prefer to go back in time and live in Zhivkov's Bulgaria, than continue living in the modern-day republic	41%	-	41%	18%	RC Trend
The country was ruined following Zhivkov's resignation	74%	-	16%	10%	Gallup

=== Political and social ===
Zhivkov ultimately survived the Sino-Soviet split, Khrushchev's fall in October 1964, an attempted Stalinist-Maoist coup d'état in 1965, his daughter Lyudmila Zhivkova's death in 1981, Brezhnev's death in 1982, and Mikhail Gorbachev's post-1985 reforms.

However, shortly after falling from power, Zhivkov was expelled from the communist party and subsequently arrested by his former comrades. The Soviet Bloc in the face of the Council for Mutual Economic Assistance (SEV, Comecon), the Warsaw Pact Organization and the USSR itself collapsed. The communist party rebranded itself as the Bulgarian Socialist Party and won the 1990 Bulgarian Constitutional Assembly election, defeating both the right-wing opposition Union of Democratic Forces (UDF) and the Movement for Rights and Freedoms, a party representing ethnic Turks. Analyst Gerald Creed opined that this marked a significant victory for supporters of socialism in Bulgaria, noting that Bulgaria had become the first Eastern European country to re-elect an openly socialist party in a free election following the collapse of socialism in the bloc. The Socialist-led government, however, failed at addressing the problems facing the country and providing a cohesive vision for the future. It suffered a split as the left wing of the party broke off in order to form the New Bulgarian Communist Party, while the right-wing opposition remained united and aggressively opposed the government, hampering any attempts at finding an exit to the political crisis that had gripped the country. The Socialists' government, which had by then rejected Marxism–Leninism in favour of social democracy under its new leader Andrey Lukanov, subsequently collapsed under its inability to deal with the crisis, narrowly losing the opposition in the 1991 Bulgarian parliamentary election.

Zhivkov's attempts to integrate and assimilate Bulgarian Turks ultimately did not yield their intended results, instead leading to the creation of the Movement for Rights and Freedoms, a party largely based on ethnic Turkish affiliation. Despite the fact that Bulgaria's post-1991 constitution retained the restrictions against the formation of racial, ethnic or religious-based parties, the MRF was ruled a legal party by Bulgaria's supreme court in 1992.

The country's political ideology and foreign policies of Zhivkov's era have thus been reversed.

=== Economic ===
After very significant reverses and difficulties in the 1940s and 1950s, the Bulgarian economy developed apace from the mid-1960s until the late 1970s. Most of today's large industrial facilities such as the Kremikovtsi steelworks and the Chervena Mogila engineering works were built under Zhivkov. Bulgaria's nuclear power station, AEC Kozloduy, was built in the 1970s, all six large reactors commissioned in under five years. This, and Bulgaria's many coal-fired and hydroelectric power stations, made the country a major electric power exporter. By the 1970s, the focus switched to high technologies such as electronics and even space exploration: on 10 April 1979 Bulgaria launched the first of two kosmonavti (cosmonauts), Georgi Ivanov, aboard Soviet Soyuz spaceships and later launched its own space satellites. Having been among the first nations to market electronic calculators (the ELKA brand, since 1973) and digital watches (Elektronika, since 1975), in 1982 the country launched its Pravets personal computer (a near-"Apple II clone") for business and domestic use. In the mid-1960s an economic reform package was introduced, which allowed for farmers to freely sell their over-planned production. Shortly after that Bulgaria became the first and only Eastern Bloc country which locally produced Coca-Cola. Mass tourism developed under Zhivkov's direction from the early 1960s onwards.

However, this Bulgarian economy was exceptionally susceptible to Soviet largesse and Soviet-bloc markets. After the Soviet crude oil price shock of 1979, it entered a very severe recession from which it hardly recovered in the 1980s. After the early-1990s loss of Soviet and Comecon markets, this economy (unused to competing in a free market environment) entered prolonged and significant contraction. Zhivkov-era industrial facilities were largely unattractive to investors, many being left to decay. Great numbers of specialist personnel retired and died without being replaced, or else emigrated or left their state jobs for more lucrative private employment. As agriculture declined, tourism has emerged as almost the sole Zhivkov-era industrial survivor. However, it is widely thought that incompetent and corrupt administration after 1989 had a much greater effect on the decline of the economy, as even successful industries declined. Following the end of Zhivkov's rule state properties were widely embezzled and stripped of assets, the revenues of which were funnelled through tax havens, creating a new class of nouveau riche oligarchs at the cost of the destruction of Bulgaria's industry. This was done both by ex-functionaries from Zhivkov's former party turned 'businessmen', as well as by members of the right-wing opposition, the Union of Democratic Forces, which came into power a year later.

== Family and personal life ==
Zhivkov married Mara Maleeva (1911–1971) in 1938. They had two children, a daughter named Lyudmila Zhivkova and a son called Vladimir Zhivkov. Maleeva was diagnosed with stomach cancer in 1969, leading to a two year long and ultimately futile fight with the disease. Maleeva reportedly did not wish to undergo surgery, but Zhivkov insistently convinced her to go. The operation was successful, but the cancer was already late-stage. In August 1971, her condition worsened sharply. She was described as undergoing unbearable pain and became bedridden. In his memoirs, Zhivkov mentioned that the last time he had seen her, he noticed that she had played a recording of one of his speeches on repeat, so that she could keep listening to his voice. She died of the disease on 23 October 1971. Her death deeply affected Zhivkov and he was described as becoming unpredictable and lacking self control in the few weeks after her death.

Lyudmila would become a very notable, albeit controversial, cultural icon – promoting unorthodox and divergent artistic ideas, as well as practising Eastern religions and mysticism to the ire of both the supporters of state atheism and the Bulgarian Orthodox Church. Her mother sharply opposed the idea of Lyudmilla having any part in Bulgaria's politics and even went as far as to 'forbid' her husband Zhivkov from considering her or any other family members for political posts of any kind. Zhivkov respected his wife's wishes during her life, but reconsidered his position following her death and was later convinced to appoint Lyudmilla, who was popular among artists and the intelligentsia, as the vice-chairperson on the consultative committee for friendship and cultural diplomacy. In this position, she actively promoted cultural liberalisation with the aid of several of Bulgaria's top intellectuals, while at the same time her avant-garde tastes were left unappreciated by the general masses. She juggled Bulgarian National Revival themes with postmodernism, puzzling many observers. Zhivkov nevertheless allowed her to advise him on cultural matters and agreed on an idea she had presented alongside several artists, for the creation of a grand monument in commemoration of the 1300th Anniversary of the Bulgarian State. She had proposed the granting to an avant-garde sculptor, Valentin Starchev, full creative freedom in designing the monument. The result was a controversial monument that was both incredibly unique, and commonly understood as very ugly. Todor Zhivkov himself was said to have altered his daily commute in order to avoid having to look at it, though he never scolded the sculptor for it. Lyudmilla lived in poor health, ostensibly due to her unusual lifestyle, failed relationships and stress, dying abruptly at the age of 38 in 1981.

Zhivkov's son-in-law Ivan Slavkov became the chairman of Bulgaria's state television company and later became president of the Bulgarian Olympic Committee, a position he would continue to hold until 2005.

Zhivkov reserved a special attention for his birthplace of Pravets. In the 1960s this small village was declared "an Urban Community", becoming a town a decade later. In 1982 Bulgaria's first Apple clone personal computer was named the Pravets. The citizens of Pravets responded by erecting a heroic statue to Zhivkov which he duly had taken down, ostensibly to prevent a personality cult growing around him. It was re-erected after his death.

== Honours and awards ==
- People's Republic of Bulgaria:
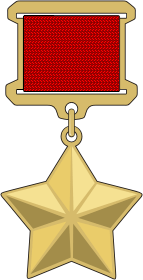
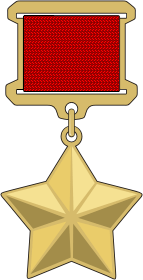
  - Hero of the People's Republic of Bulgaria, twice (1971, 1981)
  - Hero of Socialist Labor (1961)
  - Grand Master of the Order of Cyril and Methodius
  - 4 Orders of Georgi Dimitrov (1961, 1971, 1981, 1986)
  - Order "13 Centuries of Bulgaria"
  - Medal "30th Anniversary of the Victory over Nazi Germany"
  - Medal "40th Anniversary of the Victory over Hitler-Fascism"
  - Medal "1300th Anniversary of Bulgaria"
  - Medal "40th Anniversary of the Socialist Revolution in Bulgaria"
  - Medal "90th Anniversary of the Birth of Georgi Dimitrov"
  - Medal "100th Anniversary of the Birth of Georgi Dimitrov"
  - Medal "25 Years of People's Power"
  - Medal "50th Anniversary of the June Anti-fascist Uprising"
  - Medal "Patriotic War 1944–1945"
  - Medal "100th Anniversary of the April Uprising"
  - Medal for "100 Years of Liberation from Ottoman Slavery"
- Soviet Union:
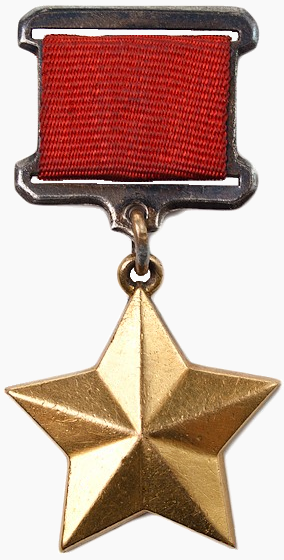
  - Hero of the Soviet Union (31 May 1977 – for his contribution to the fight against fascism in the Second World War)
  - 3 Orders of Lenin (1971, 1977, 1981)
  - Order of the October Revolution (5 September 1986)
  - Jubilee Medal "In Commemoration of the 100th Anniversary of the Birth of Vladimir Ilyich Lenin" (1969)
  - Jubilee Medal "Forty Years of Victory in the Great Patriotic War 1941–1945" (1985)
- Other countries:
  - Order of José Martí (Cuba)
  - Order of Playa Girón (Cuba)
  - Order of Klement Gottwald (Czechoslovakia)
  - Order of Victorious February (Czechoslovakia)
  - Collar of the Order of the White Lion (Czechoslovakia)
  - Order of Karl Marx, thrice (East Germany)
  - Grand Cordon of the Order of the Nile (Egypt)
  - Grand Cross of the Legion d'Honneur (France)
  - Grand Cross of Order of the Redeemer (Greece)
  - Grand Cordon of the Order of the Chrysanthemum (Japan)
  - National Gold Medal (Laos)
  - Collar of the Order of the Aztec Eagle (Mexico)
  - Order of Sukhbaatar (Mongolia)
  - First Class of Order of the National Flag (North Korea)
  - Grand Collar of the Order of Infante Dom Henrique (Portugal)
  - Order of the Star of the Romanian Socialist Republic (Romania)
  - Order of the Victory of Socialism (Romania)
  - Order of Civil Merit (Syria)
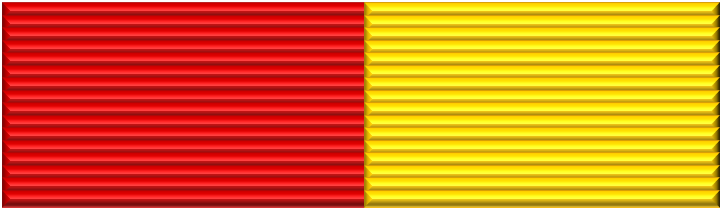
  - Gold Star Order (Vietnam)
  - Order of the Yugoslav Star (Yugoslavia)
  - Olympic Order (International Olympic Committee)

Political offices
Preceded by Georgi Traikov (as chairman of the National Assembly Presidium)	Chairman of the State Council; 7 July 1971 – 17 November 1989	Succeeded by Petar Mladenov
Preceded by Anton Yugov	Prime Minister of Bulgaria; 19 November 1962 – 7 July 1971	Succeeded by Stanko Todorov
Party political offices
Preceded by Vulko Chervenkov	General Secretary of the Bulgarian Communist Party; 4 March 1954 – 10 November 1989	Succeeded by Petar Mladenov
