= Georgi Benkovski Partisan Brigade =

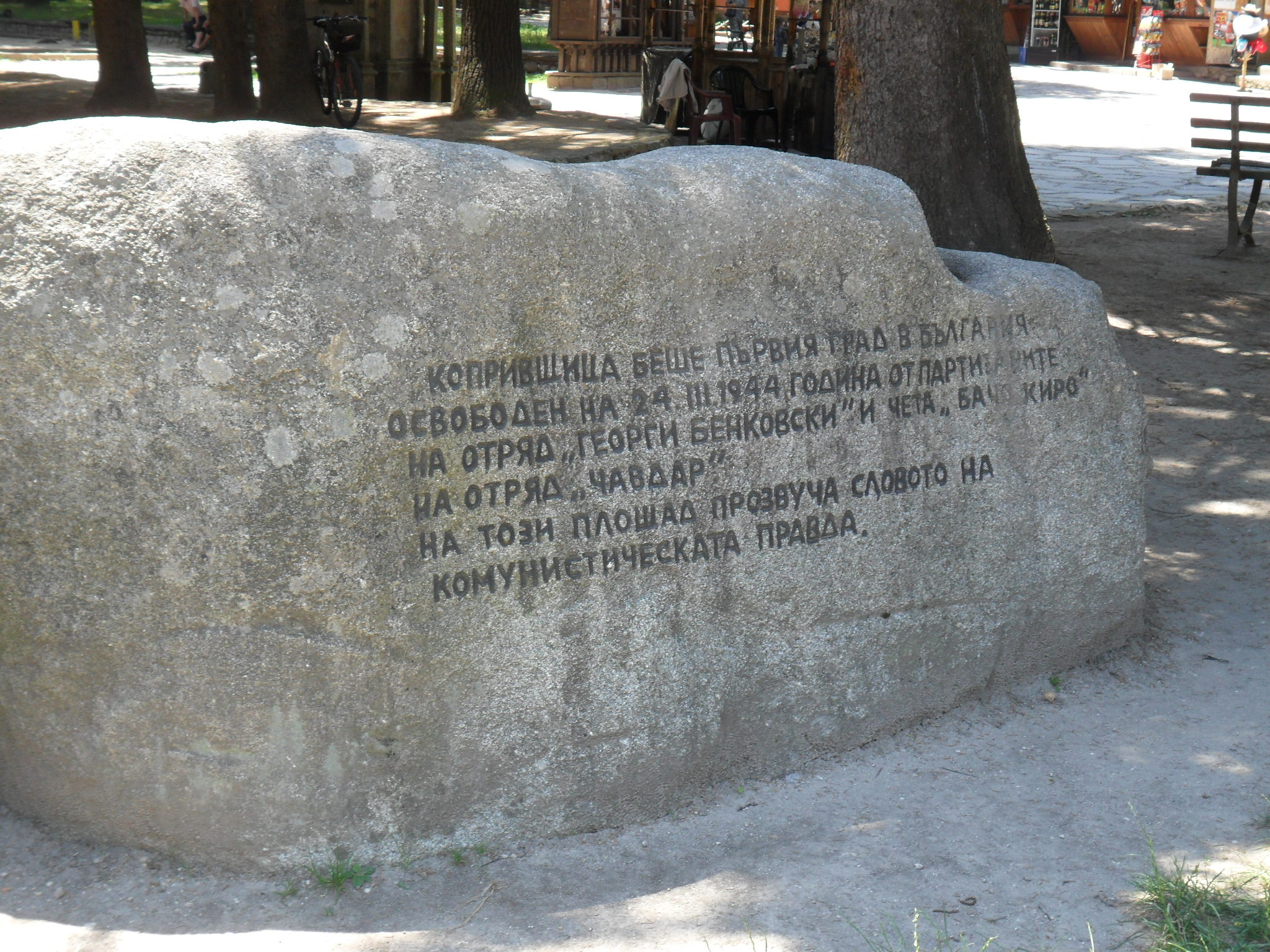
- Monument to Bulgarian Partisans in Koprivshtitsa
- Active: Summer 1942 – September 1944
- Disbanded: September 9, 1944
- Country: Bulgaria
- Allegiance: Bulgarian Partisans
- Type: Infantry
- Role: Partisans
- Size: Detachment, Battalion, Brigade.

Commanders
- Notable commanders: Luka Navushtanov, Ivan Vrachev.

The Georgi Benkovski Partisan Brigade was a division of the Third Pazardzhik Insurgent Operational Zone of NOVA during the Bulgarian resistance movement during World War II. It mainly operated in the region of Sredna Gora.

== History ==
The first partisan group was formed around the village of Strelcha in the summer of 1942. In October 1942, detachments were formed from the Strelcha and Panagyurishte groups. After expanding on May 20, 1943, they merged to from into the Georgi Benkovski Detachment. The first Commander of the detachment was Luka Navushtanov, with Tsvyatko Barov as political commissar.

In July 1943 they united for joint operations with the Ihtiman partisan detachment, though the two detachments retained separate leaders. They were holding Bunaya Peak. The two detachments separated after a major battle with the police and gendarmerie in the Konska Polyana area on August 28, 1943.

In the autumn of 1943 they carried out actions in the villages of Dushantsi and Krastevich. They spent the winter together with the Bacho Kiro detachment of the Chavdar Partisan Brigade. Together they carried out a large operation on March 24, 1944, during which they briefly captured the town of Koprivshtitsa. The brigade wintered in dugouts below Bogdan Peak, in the Barricades area and in the Fetentsi area, north of Panagyurishte.

In July 1944, the detachment grew to the size of a Brigade, consisting of four companies named 'Raina Knyaginya', 'Bozhko Ivanov', 'Todor Kableshkov', and 'Polska'. At this time the Commander was Ivan Vrachev, the political commissar was Stoyan Michev, and the Chief of Staff was Georgi Momekov. In the summer of 1944 they carried out 15 actions in the Panagyurishte, Pazardzhik and Plovdiv regions. They successfully broke a major police blockade in their camp's area.

On September 9, 1944, the partisans of the brigade took part in the establishment of the Fatherland Front in the towns of Koprivshtitsa, Klisura, and Panagyurishte.
