= Chavdar Partisan Brigade =

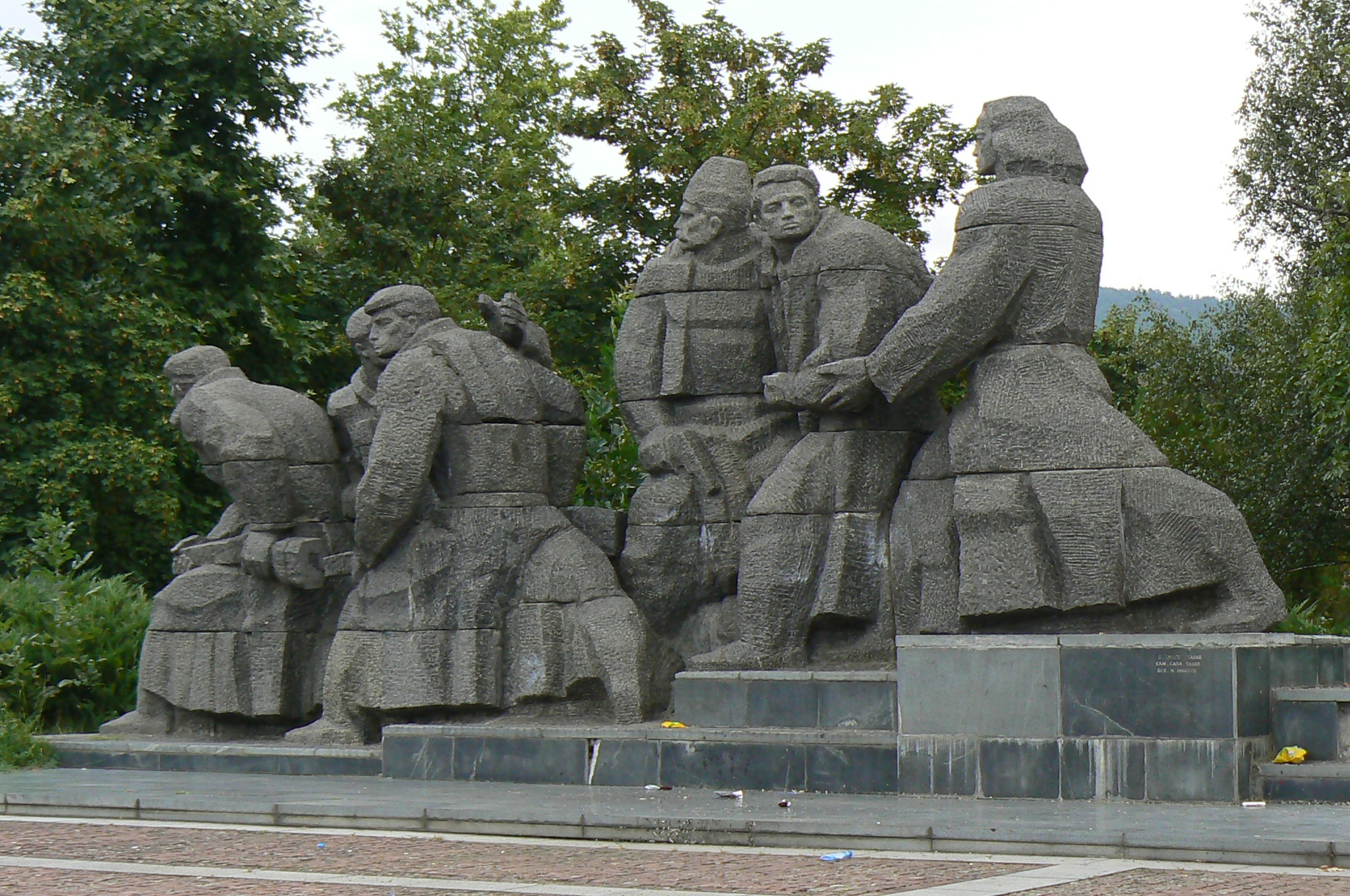
- Monument to partisans in Trudovets
- Active: Autumn 1941 – September 1944
- Disbanded: September 9, 1944
- Country: Bulgaria
- Allegiance: Bulgarian Partisans
- Type: Infantry
- Role: Partisans
- Size: Detachment, battalion, brigade

Commanders
- Notable commanders: Tone Perenovski, Dobri Dzhurov

The Chavdar Partisan Brigade was a subdivision of the First Sofia Insurgent Operational Zone of the People's Liberation Insurgent Army (NOVA) during the Bulgarian resistance movement during World War II (1941–1944). It operated in the vicinity of Novo Selo, Botevgrad, Pirdop, Etropole and Yakoruda.

The 'brigade' started out at the size of a detachment, but by 1944 had grown to Battalion size, it was only towards the end of its existence that it was the size of an actual brigade. It was incorporated into the Fatherland Front shortly after.

== History ==
The first partisan group in the area of Murgash Peak was established in the autumn of 1941. After its expansion in September 1942, it formed the Chavdar Partisan Brigade. The first Brigade commander was Tone Perenovski, the political commissar was Dobri Dzhurov, and the deputy commander was Ivan Shonev. It was divided into two detachments - "Bacho Kiro" and "Boycho Ognyanov". In October 1943, a conference of the detachment's leadership was held, at which a plan for its political and military activities was drawn up. Todor Zhivkov was made the Plenipotentiary of the BRP Regional Committee for the brigade.

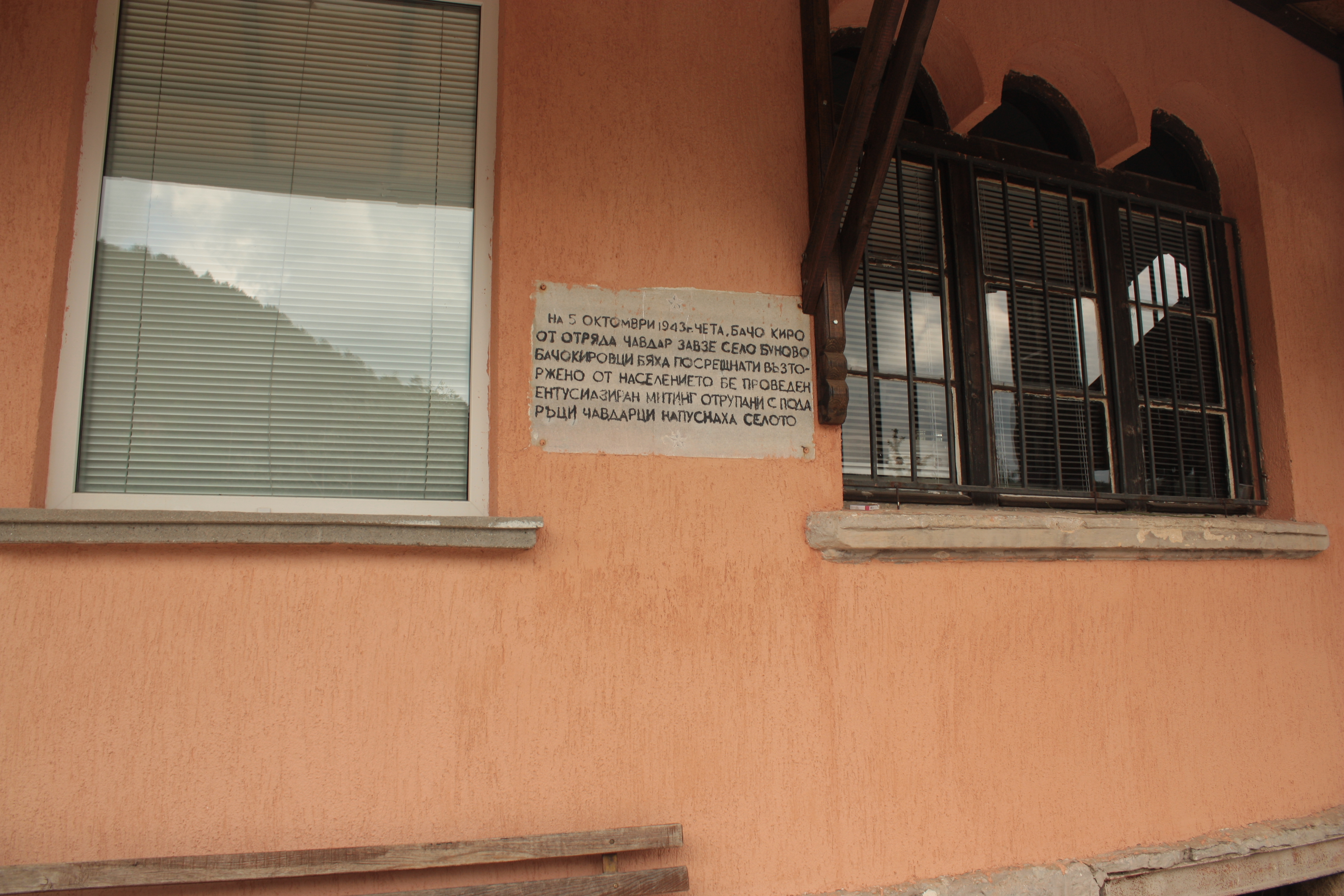
Memorial plaque to the action in Bunovo

Until the end of 1943, actions were mainly carried out in the villages of Bunovo, Smolsko, Radoslavovo (now Chavdar), and the post at the Galabets pass. In December 1943, the Bacho Kiro detachment fought in Lopyanska Gora with about 200 policemen and defeated them. On March 8, 1944, they captured the village of Kremikovtsi, which is in close proximity to Sofia. On March 24, 1944, together with the Georgi Benkovski Partisan Brigade captured the town of Koprivshtitsa. The actions provoked discussion in the Regency Council on a report by the Minister of the Interior Docho Hristov. Regents Bogdan Filov and Nikola Mihov noted that the concentration of guerrilla forces around the capital, and outlined measures to counter the army, gendarmerie and public force. The actions of the brigade were also in the field of view of the German intelligence in Bulgaria, which marked their scale in the cases of the village of Kremikovtsi and the town of Koprivshtitsa.

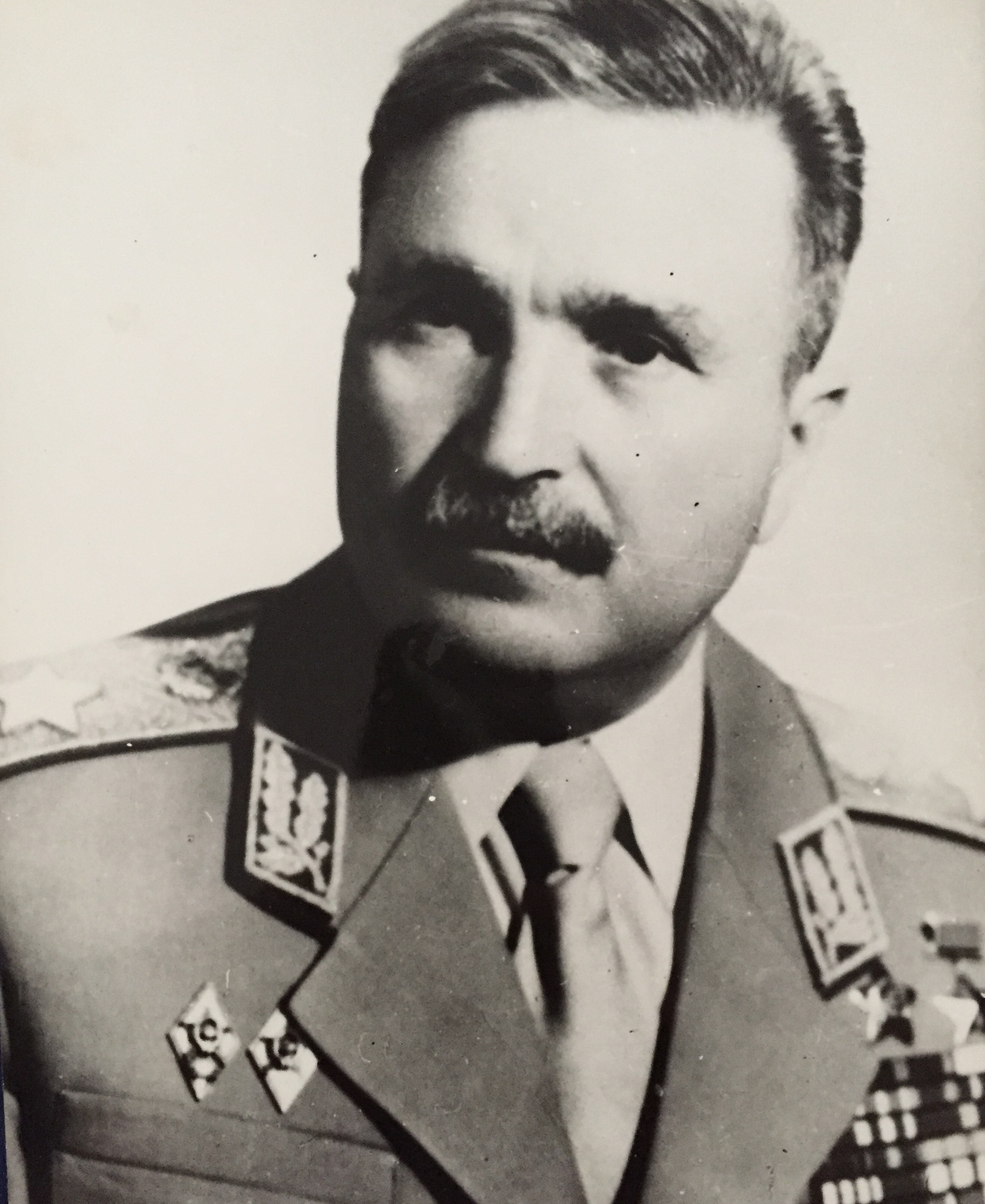
Dobri Dzhurov, Brigade Commander

In April 1944, the brigade numbered 437 partisans and grew to a greater size, and was thus divided into three companies. The commander of the brigade at this time was Dobri Djurov, the assistant commander was Dimitar Kirkov, and the political commissar was Stamo Kerezov. On April 26, 1944, I and II companies raided the warehouses at Sarantsi station, which armed most of the partisans. III company was transferred to Rhodopes and carried out actions in the village of Sestrimo and Yakoruda station. They grew into a battalion. A new Field Battalion was formed.

On May 3, 1944, I and II companies fought a great battle over the Eleshnitsa Monastery. In May and June 1944, the two companies came under blockade, organized by the military, gendarmerie and police units from the cities of Vratsa, Pleven and Sofia. The guerrillas suffered many casualties in the bloody fighting, but eventually emerged from the blockade. The survivors of the two companies united with the survivors of the Hristo Botev Partisan Battalion and conducted actions in the villages of Seslavtsi, Kremikovtsi and Botunets. III company participated in the formation of the Fourth Sofia Insurgent Brigade.

On September 9, 1944, the Chavdar Brigade participated in the establishment of the power of the Fatherland Front in the Ihtiman, Botevgrad, Pirdop and Sofia regions.
