= Ivan Todorov-Gorunya =

Bulgarian politician (1916–1965)

Ivan Todorov Vankinski-Gorunya (Bulgarian: Иван Тодоров-Горуня; 5 January 1916 – 8 April 1965, also spelled Gorunia and Gorunja) was a Bulgarian politician.

== Biography ==
Todorov-Gorunya was born in 1916 in the village Gorna Kremena in Vratsa Province. Little is known about his early life; however, he was known to have been a stonemason for sixteen years. It is also known that he joined the Bulgarian Workers' Party in 1939. That same year he was sentenced to seven and a half years in jail for terrorist activities. While in jail he maintained close relations with Tsolo Кrastev and Tsvyatko Anev, later to become conspirators.

It is not clear how he got out, but in September 1941 he became the first communist partisan in the Vratsa Province, who fought against the pro-German government of Bulgaria in World War II. After the communist takeover, he held the post of vice-minister of agriculture.

=== Political career ===
After voicing criticisms towards Todor Zhivkov's reforms of de-Stalinization in the late 1950s he was ostracized for a while, but was then brought back and made a member of Central Committee of the Bulgarian Communist Party.

Toward the end of 1964 and in early 1965, Todorov-Gorunya and Tsolo Кrastev organized group of high-ranking military officers planning to overthrow the regime led by Todor Zhivkov. Among the officers was the commander of the Sofia garrison general Tsvyatko Anev. Their plan was to establish a pro-Chinese leadership in the country.

The coup (also known as April Conspiracy) was exposed by the counter-intelligence service and between 28 March and 12 April 1965 most of the plotters were arrested. Todorov-Gorunya (probably) committed suicide just before the arrest. Nine of the other participants received relatively mild sentences ranging from 8 to 15 years imprisonment, while another 192 got party or administrative punishments. Existence of the plot was kept hidden from the public.

== Literature ==
- A Handbook of the Communist Security Apparatus in East Central Europe 1944–1989, Warsaw, 2005, ISBN 83-89078-82-1. Article "Bulgaria" by Jordan Baev and Kostadin Grozev, pp. 37–86.
- Ionko Bonov: Legendarniiat Ivan Todorov-Gorunya: Khudozhestveno-dokumentalna povest (Legendary Ivan Todorov-Gorunya: Artistic and Documentary Report), 1994, ISBN 978-954-8019-01-9.
