= Princess Eudoxia of Bulgaria =

Bulgarian princess (1898–1985)

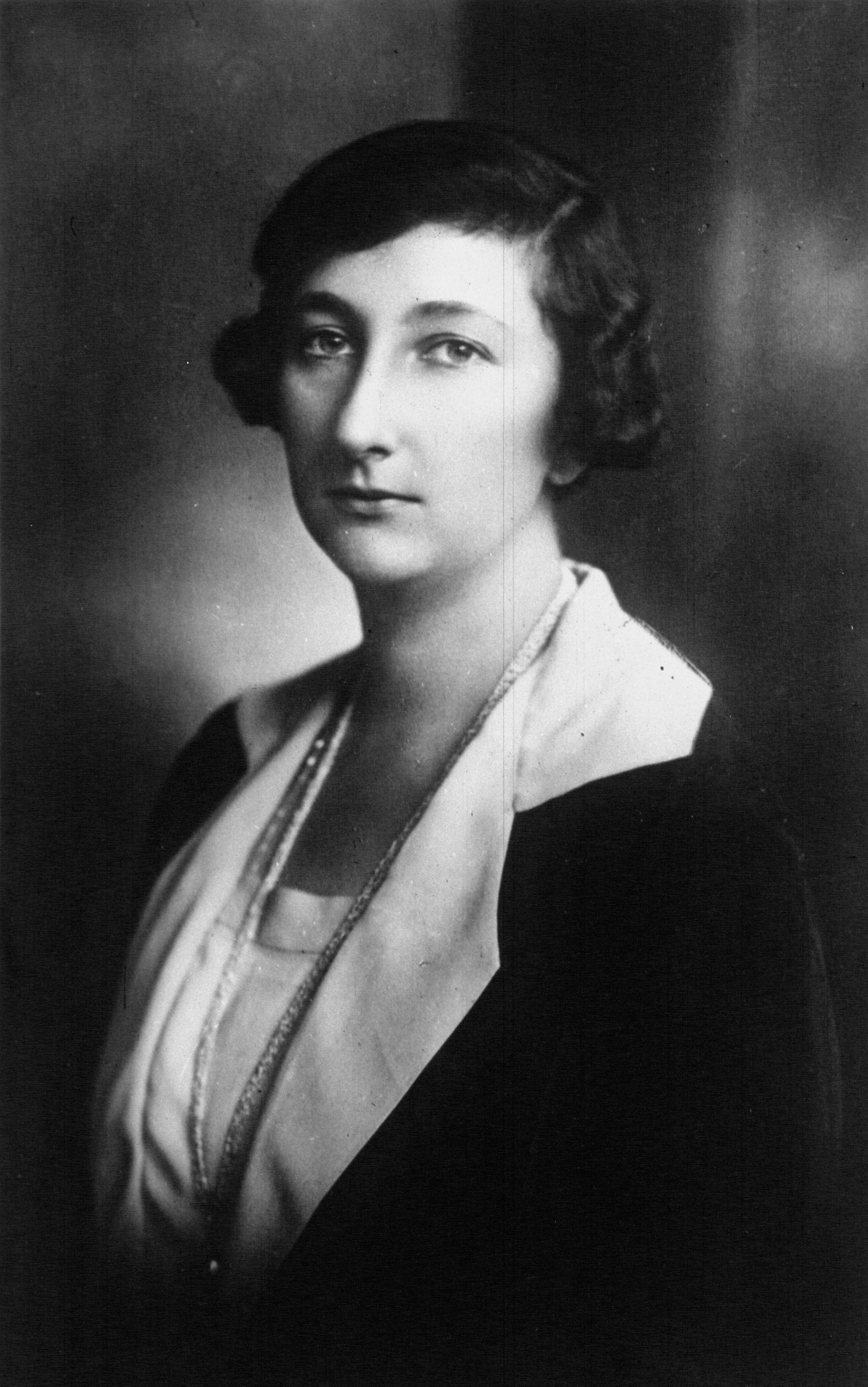
- Eudoxia in 1932
- Born: 5 January 1898; Sofia, Principality of Bulgaria
- Died: 4 October 1985 (aged 87); Friedrichshafen, West Germany
- Burial: Altshausen Castle
Names
- Eudoxia Augusta Philippine Clementine Maria
- House: Saxe-Coburg and Gotha-Kohary
- Father: Ferdinand I of Bulgaria
- Mother: Marie Louise of Bourbon-Parma
- Religion: Roman Catholicism

Princess Eudoxia of Bulgaria (Bulgarian: Княгиня Евдокия; 5 January 1898 – 4 October 1985) was the eldest daughter and third child of King Ferdinand I of Bulgaria and his first wife, Princess Marie Louise of Bourbon-Parma. She was a devoted sister and confidante to King Boris III.

== Biography ==
=== Family ===
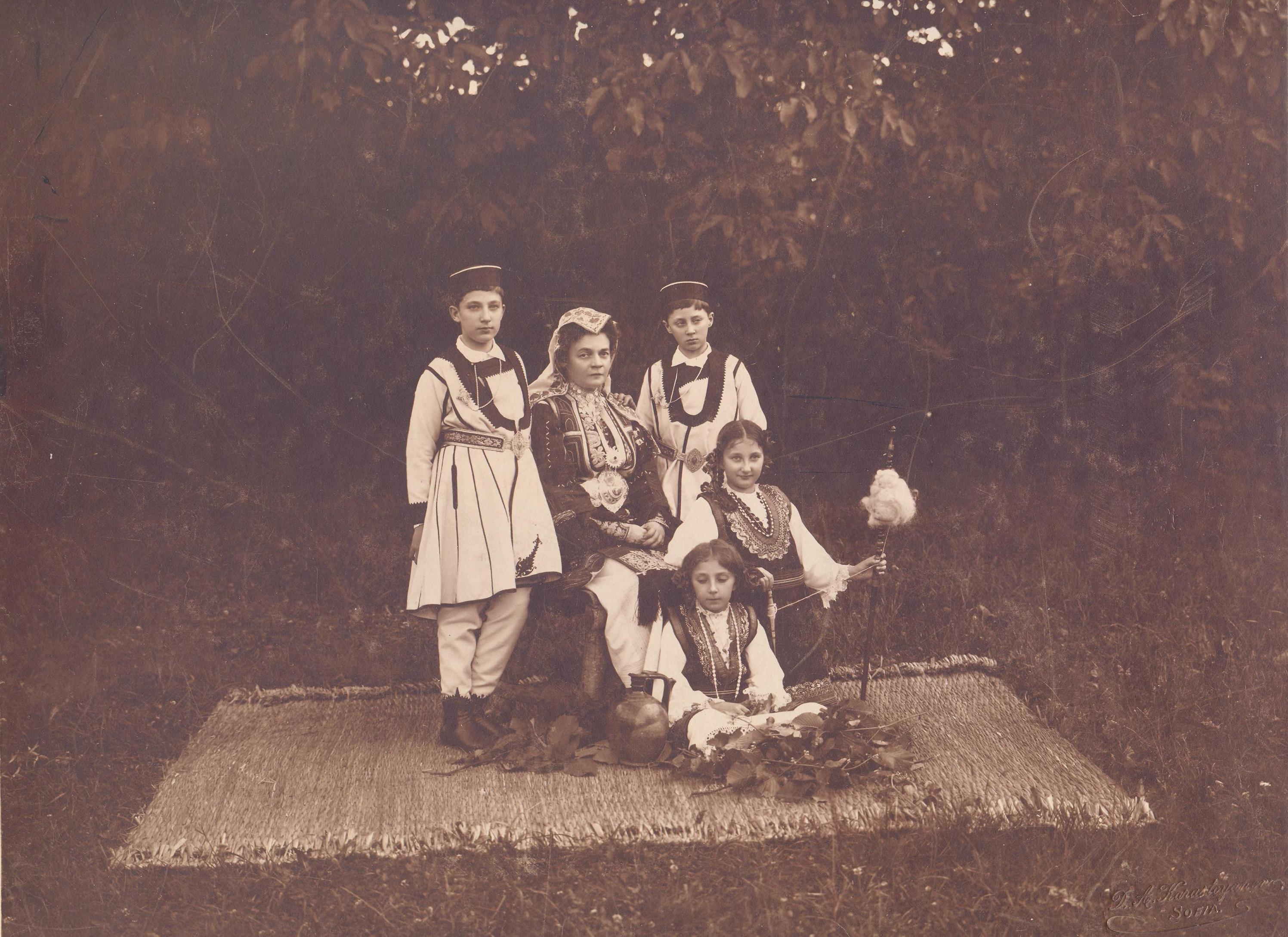
Eudoxia of Bulgaria, her stepmother Eleonore Reuss of Köstritz, and her siblings, circa late 1900s.

The eldest daughter and third of four children of King Ferdinand I of Bulgaria and his first wife, Princess Marie Louise of Bourbon-Parma, Eudoxia of Bulgaria was born at the Royal Palace in Sofia on 17 January 1898. Her name, Eudoxia, means "one who is valued."

Eudoxia was exactly one year old when her mother died the day after the birth of her last child, Eudoxia's younger sister Nadezhda, on 31 January 1899.

Through her father, Ferdinand, who became King of the Bulgarians in 1908, she was a great-granddaughter of Louis Philippe I, King of the French; while through her mother, she was the niece of Empress Zita of Bourbon-Parma and was descended from the Dukes of Parma, the Kings of the Two Sicilies, the Kings of France, and many other European sovereigns.

Eudoxia of Bulgaria had two brothers: Boris, who succeeded his father to the Bulgarian throne upon his abdication in 1918, and Kirill. She also had a sister, Nadezhda, with whom she was raised under the authority of their stepmother, Eleonore Reuss of Köstritz, whom King Ferdinand married in 1908. Her paternal grandmother, Princess Clémentine of Orléans, attempted to spend as much time as possible with her Bulgarian grandchildren. The aging grandmother died on 16 February 1907.

=== First Lady and Personal Life ===
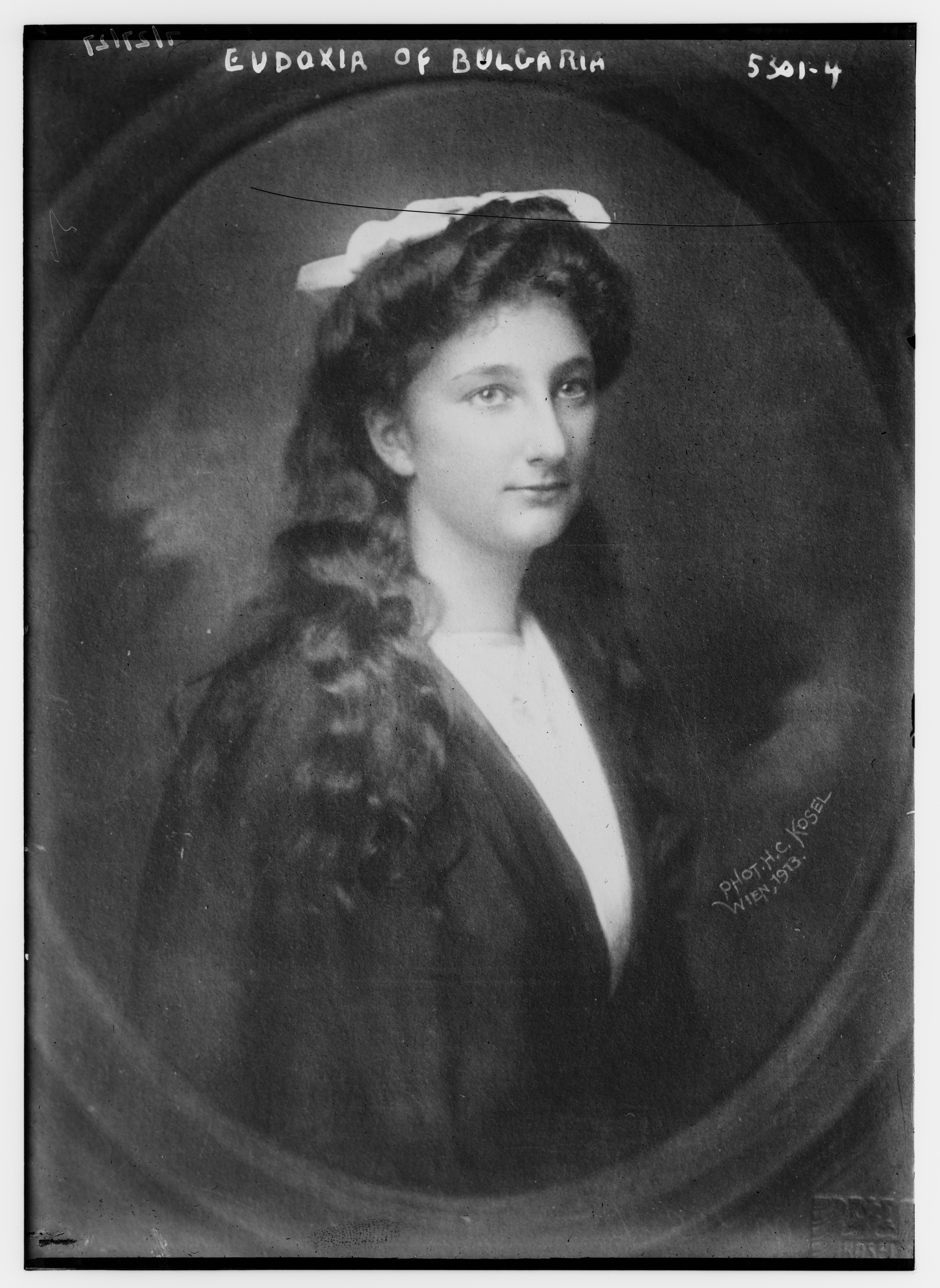
Eudoxia in 1918

From an early age, Eudoxia was interested in the fine arts. Her artistic talents allowed her to design flags for various regiments and create paintings, mostly depicting nature.

In 1922, Eudoxia and her sister Princess Nadejda became the confidants of King Boris III of Bulgaria. A loyal confidante of her brother, Eudoxia nevertheless followed her father into exile in Coburg in 1918. She returned to Bulgaria in 1922 and acted as First Lady of the Land until King Boris III married Princess Giovanna of Savoy (also known as Giovanna of Italy) in 1930.

Princess Eudoxia never married; although, there were persistent rumors that she wished to marry a man of Bulgarian descent, which was dynastically unacceptable at that time. Eudoxia had a brief romance with Parvan Draganov (1890–1945), an aide-de-camp to her brother, and later became close to Ivan Bagryanov (1891–1945). However, she remained unmarried as these relationships, according to the constitution and her father's opposition, could not lead to marriage.

Her relations with her brother Boris became cooler and more distant after the King's marriage. In 1937, Eudoxia left the Royal Palace in Sofia to move into a residence built for her in the Izgrev district of the capital. King Boris died shortly after meeting Adolf Hitler on 28 August 1943. His son Simeon succeeded him at the age of six. The regency was entrusted to his uncle Kirill.

=== Arrest, Exile and Death ===
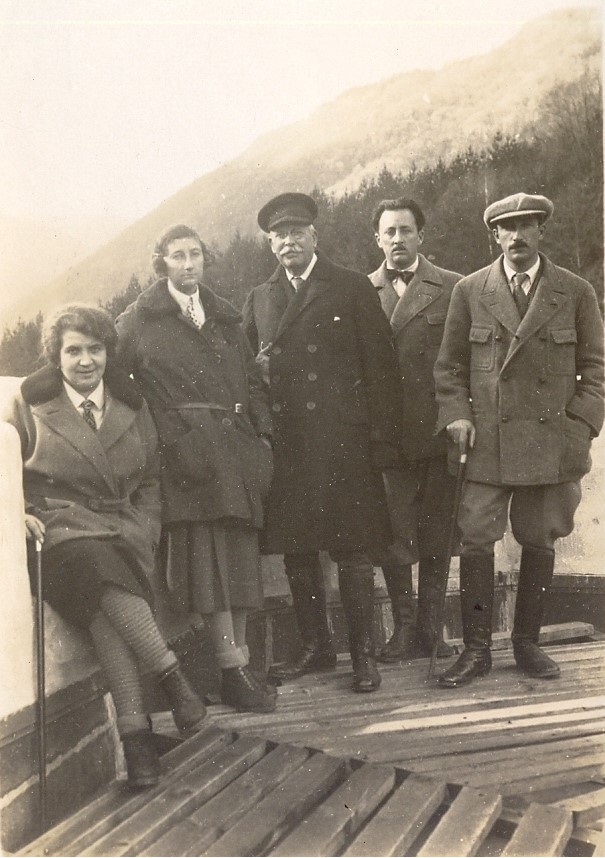
Eudoxia of Bulgaria and her brothers at the Rila Monastery.

After 9 September 1944, Princess Eudoxia was arrested and tortured by the Communists. On 11 September 1944, two days after the 1944 Bulgarian coup d'état, she was detained and later learned that her brother Kirill had been executed by firing squad on 1 February 1945.

On 15 September 1946, a referendum resulted in the major approval of the abolition of the monarchy. Eudoxia's nephew, the child-king Simeon II, was deposed, although no abdication was ever ratified. In September 1946, the royal family was exiled. Eudoxia shared their fate and left Bulgaria to settle with her father in Coburg, who died on 10 September 1948.

Thereafter, Eudoxia joined her sister Nadezhda, wife of Duke Albrecht Eugen of Württemberg, and settled permanently in Germany. When her sister Nadezhda died in 1958, Eudoxia moved into a Catholic retirement home in Friedrichshafen, near Lake Constance. She lived an austere lifestyle, marked by nostalgia for her native Bulgaria.

The last survivor of her siblings, Eudoxia of Bulgaria died on 4 October 1985 at the age of 87 in Friedrichshafen. She is buried in the crypt of Altshausen Castle.

=== Personality ===
In the book Giovanna of Bulgaria: The Queen of Charity, the author wrote:

Eudoxie had an exceptional personality, with a quick mind, alert, watchful eyes, an uncanny feeling for people and events. Of all of King Ferdinand's children she is said to have inherited most of his typical character traits. Usually kind and witty, she could be sharp, critical and even sarcastic towards those she thought deserved it. Her authoritarian behaviour towards people contrasted with her full and utter devotion to her brother. She spent the happiest and most difficult times for the crown at his side...

== Literature ==
- Hans-Joachim Böttcher: Ferdinand von Sachsen-Coburg und Gotha 1861–1948: Ein Kosmopolit auf dem bulgarischen Thron. Osteuropazentrum-Berlin-Verlag (Anthea-Verlagsgruppe), Berlin 2019, ISBN 978-3-89998-296-1, pp. 391–392 a.o.

== Arms ==
Coat of Arms of Princess Eudoxia of Bulgaria

== Ancestors ==
Ancestors of Princess Eudoxia of Bulgaria

8. Prince Ferdinand of Saxe-Coburg and Gotha
4. Prince August of Saxe-Coburg and Gotha
9. Princess Maria Antonia Koháry of Csábrág and Szitnya
2. Ferdinand I of Bulgaria
10. Louis Philippe I of France
5. Princess Clémentine of Orléans
11. Princess Maria Amalia of Naples and Sicily
1. Princess Eudoxia of Bulgaria
12. Charles III, Duke of Parma
6. Robert I, Duke of Parma
13. Princess Louise of Artois
3. Princess Marie Louise of Bourbon-Parma
14. Ferdinand II of the Two Sicilies
7. Princess Maria Pia of Bourbon-Two Sicilies
15. Archduchess Maria Theresa of Austria

== Sources ==
- Defrance, Olivier (2007). La Médicis des Cobourg: Clémentine d'Orléans. Brussels: Racine. ISBN 978-2-87386-486-6.
- Énache, Nicolas (1999). La descendance de Marie-Thérèse de Habsburg (in French). Paris: Éditions L'intermédiaire des chercheurs et curieux. ISBN 978-2-908003-04-8.
- Huberty, Michel; Giraud, Alain; Magdelaine, F.; Magdelaine, B. (1976). L'Allemagne dynastique (in French). Vol. I: Hesse-Reuss-Saxe. Le Perreux-sur-Marne: A. Giraud. ISBN 978-2-90113-801-3.
