= Princess Marie Louise of Bourbon-Parma =

Princess of Bulgaria from 1893 to 1899

Maria Luisa Pia of Bourbon-Parma
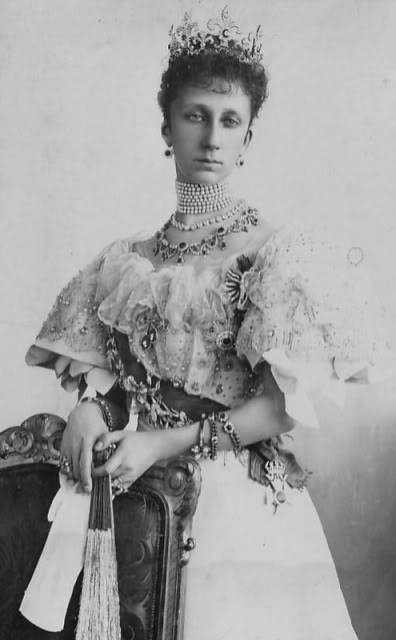

Princess consort of Bulgaria
- Tenure: 20 April 1893 – 31 January 1899
- Born: 17 January 1870; Rome, Papal States
- Died: 31 January 1899 (aged 29); Sofia, Principality of Bulgaria
- Burial: Cathedral of St Louis of France
- Spouse: Ferdinand I, Prince of Bulgaria (m. 1893)
- Issue: Boris III; Kiril, Prince of Preslav; Princess Eudoxia; Nadezhda, Duchess Albrecht Eugen of Württemberg
Names
- Italian: Maria Luisa Pia Teresa Anna Ferdinanda Francesca Antonietta Margherita Giuseppina Carolina Bianca Lucia Apollonia di Borbone-Parma French: Marie Louise Pia Thérèse Anne Ferdinande Françoise Antoinette Marguerite Joséphine Caroline Blanche Lucie Apolline de Bourbon-Parma English: Mary Louisa Pia Theresa Anne Ferdinanda Frances Antonia Margaret Josephine Caroline Blanche Lucy Apollonia of Bourbon-Parma
- House: Bourbon-Parma
- Father: Robert I of Parma
- Mother: Princess Maria Pia of Bourbon-Two Sicilies

Princess Maria Luisa of Bourbon-Parma (Maria Luisa Pia Teresa Anna Ferdinanda Francisca Antonietta Margherita Giuseppina Carolina Biaca Lucia Apollonia di Borbone-Parma; 17 January 1870 – 31 January 1899) was the eldest daughter of Robert I, the last reigning Duke of Parma. She became Princess of Bulgaria upon her marriage to Ferdinand I, the then prince-regnant (who became Tsar after the Bulgarian Declaration of Independence in 1908). She was the mother of Tsar Boris III of Bulgaria.

== Early life ==
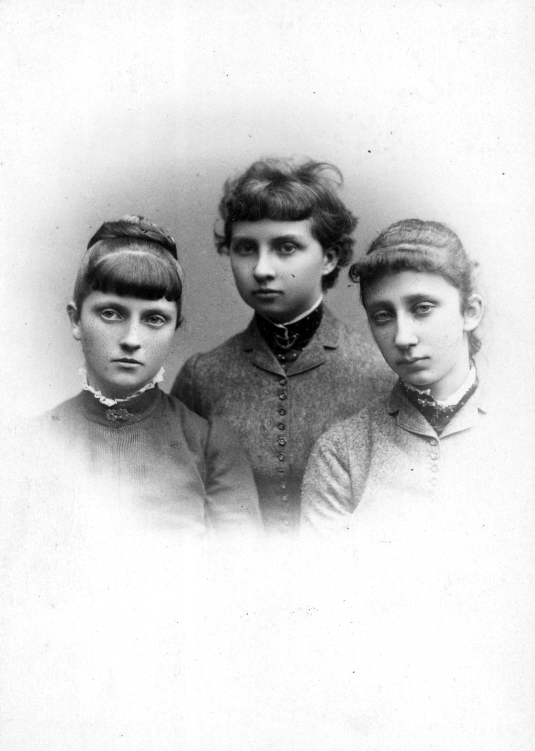
Marie Louise (right) photographed with her cousins Louise and Blanca

Marie Louise was born in Rome on 17 January 1870 as Maria Luisa Pia Teresa Anna Ferdinanda Francesca Antonietta Margherita Giuseppina Carolina Bianca Lucia Apollonia di Borbone-Parma, the eldest daughter of Robert I, Duke of Parma, and Princess Maria Pia of Bourbon-Two Sicilies. Her godfather was Pope Pius IX, while her godmother was her great-grandmother, Maria Teresa of Savoy, the Dowager Duchess of Parma.

Her parents produced eleven more children before Maria Pia died in childbirth in 1882. Later, Robert remarried Infanta Maria Antonia of Portugal (who was only eight years older than Marie Louise) and had twelve more children.

Marie Louise, who was 12 at the time of her mother's death, was brought up in Biarritz and Switzerland under the care of English governesses. Fluent in five languages, she liked painting and music. Her talents playing the guitar and the piano were judged to be well above the average. She was also well read and knew a lot of Dante and Leopardi by heart.

== Marriage ==
Ferdinand and Marie Louise leave the chapel at the Villa Pianore after their wedding. Wood engraving from L'Illustrazione popolare (1893).

In 1892, her father arranged her marriage to the then reigning Prince of Bulgaria, Ferdinand of Saxe-Coburg and Gotha. The prince had already been rejected by two of Marie-Louise's first cousins: Archduchess Louise of Austria and Princess Beatrice of Bourbon. The negotiations were conducted between Duke Robert and Ferdinand's ambitious mother, Princess Clémentine of Orléans.

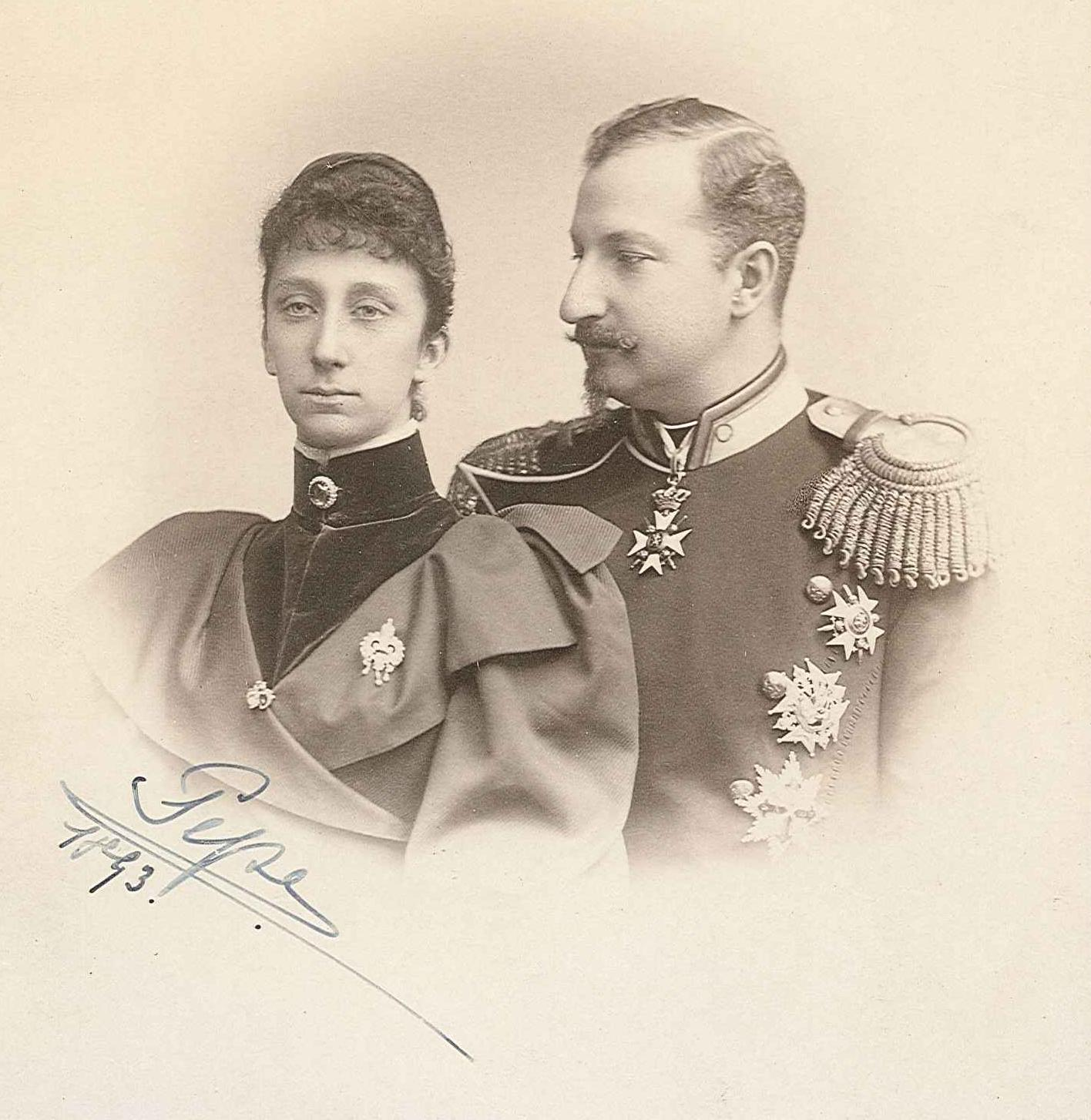
Ferdinand I and Marie Louise (1893)

The engagement was celebrated in November 1892 at the Castle of Schwarzau am Steinfeld, the Austrian residence of the Bourbon-Parma family in Lower Austria. Marie Louise and Ferdinand had never met prior to that day. Princess Clémentine, who was present on that occasion, described her future daughter-in-law in a letter to Queen Victoria as "Unhappily not very pretty, it is the only thing which is lacking, since she is charming, good, very witty, intelligent and very likable". The engagement was publicly announced in Bulgaria in February 1893.

The wedding took place on 20 April 1893 at the Villa Pianore, the Italian residence of Duke Roberto in Camaiore near Lucca in Tuscany. Marie Louise was 23 at the time, nine years younger than the 32-year-old Ferdinand. As Marie Louise and her family were devout Catholics, they stipulated to Ferdinand that their children must be raised in the Roman Catholic faith—a requirement that necessitated an amendment to Bulgaria’s constitution, the Tarnovo Constitution.

Princess Beatrice of Bourbon, Marie Louise's first cousin and friend discribed the wedding in a letter to her brother Jaime:

We—that is to say, Papa, Elvira, Alicia, myself, and the ladies—went into the boys’ study rooms, and from there we watched the wedding procession pass by. The area in front of the chapel had been specially arranged, using the courtyard between the two houses as a backdrop, complete with a beautiful façade designed in the style of Lucca. [...] Inside the chapel were: Aunt Marie-Antoinette, Uncle Robert, Aunt Aldegonde, Uncle Henri, Louis of Cobourg, old Clémentine, Clotilde, Philippe of Saxe-Coburg and Gotha, Princess Amélie of Bavaria, the Duke and Duchess of La Grazia, Luisa Pia, and Béatrice of Parma. He said "yes" in a very brief and precise manner; as for her, she could barely be heard—she was deeply moved.

According to Princess Beatrice, Marie Louise made a stop in Naples before traveling to Bulgaria—a journey she had always dreamed of taking, as her mother hailed from the Two Sicilies.

== Princess consort of Bulgaria ==
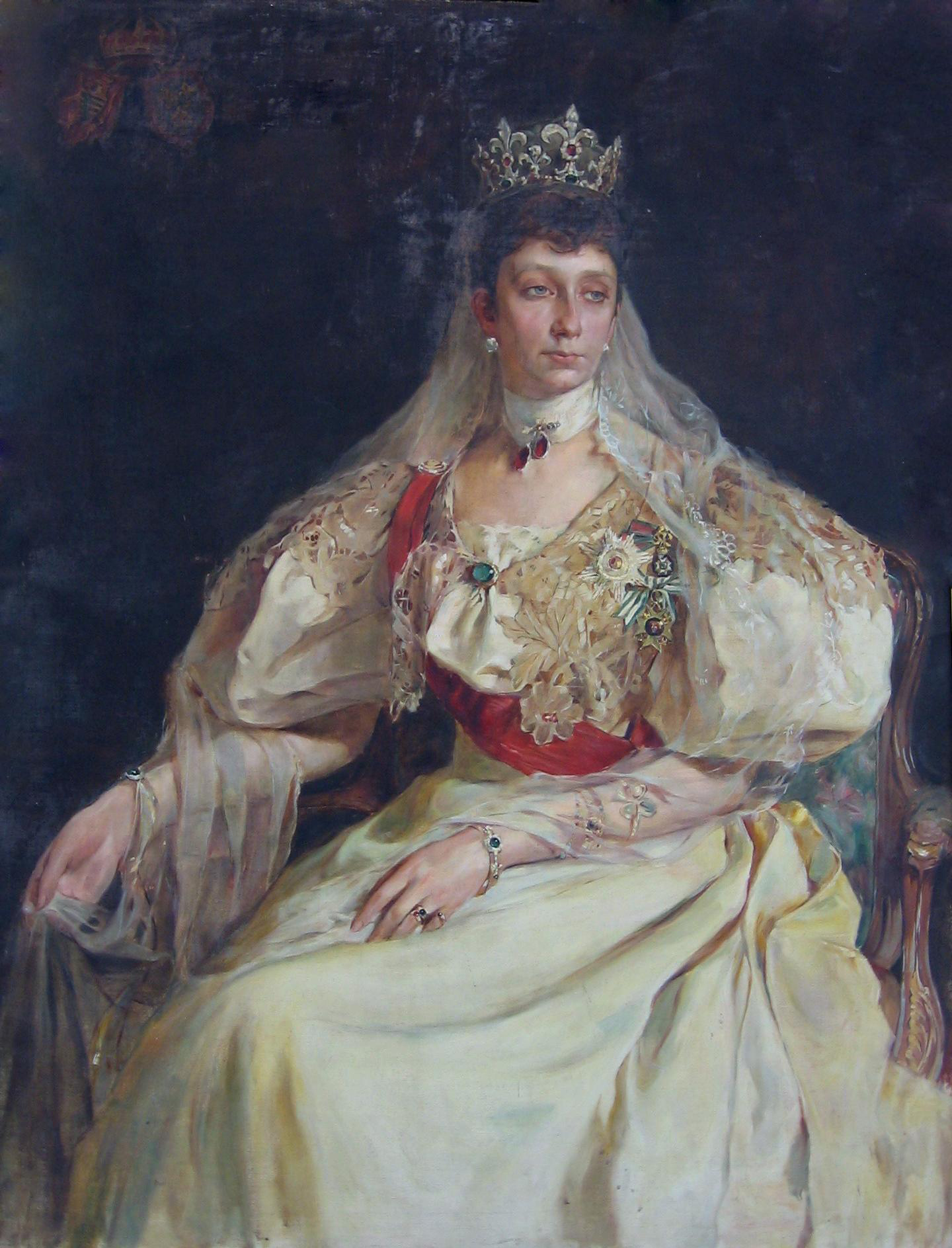
Portrait by Philip de László

It is thought that Marie Louise was not loved by her husband. However, he made sure that in order to secure his lineage on the Bulgarian throne, she would bear him children. The couple wasted no time producing an heir, with their son Boris, the future tsar Boris III, born nine months and ten days after their wedding. In total, four children would be born to Marie Louise and Ferdinand.

Under pressure from his subjects and looking to be recognized as Bulgaria's sovereign by the Russian emperor, Ferdinand wanted to have their eldest son and heir to the throne, Boris, converted to the Bulgarian Orthodox Church in the summer of 1895. Marie Louise, who was pregnant at the time, argued bitterly against her husband's actions, with the support of her father and her mother-in-law. Marie Louise and Ferdinand's second child, Prince Kiril, received baptism with Roman Catholic rites. However, unable to avoid Boris's conversion, Marie Louise, who had threatened to leave the country, left Sofia that same day for Beaulieu.

In May 1896, however, Marie Louise returned to Bulgaria. In the summer of the same year, she went to London with her husband for Queen Victoria's Diamond Jubilee, giving birth the following January to Princess Eudoxia. In July 1898, with her husband and their four-year-old, Boris, they visited St Petersburg at the invitation of Nicholas II of Russia.

== Death ==
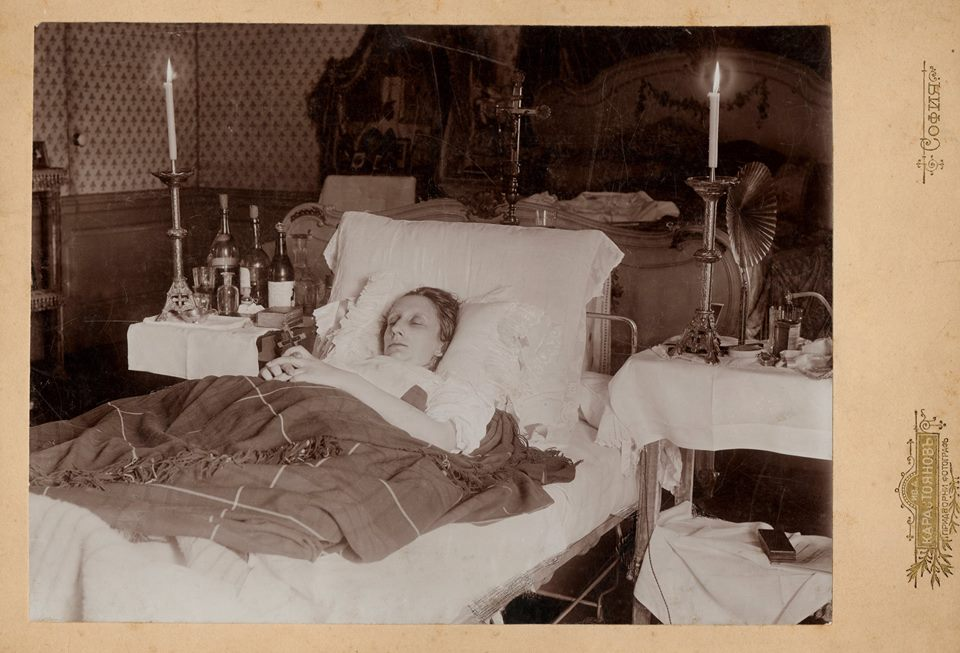
Princess Marie Louise in her deathbed

Sarcophagus of Princess Marie Louise in the Cathedral of St Louis in Plovdiv.

Disillusionment in her private life and bearing four children in five years affected her frail health. Suffering from pneumonia, Marie Louise died in Sofia, 24 hours after giving birth to her fourth child, Princess Nadezhda. Aged just 29, she was buried in the Roman Catholic Cathedral of St Louis of France, in Plovdiv, Bulgaria. Her sarcophagus was created by the Italian sculptor Tommaso Gentile, and inscribed beneath it are her final words to Ferdinand: "I die, but from heaven I will watch over you, our children, and Bulgaria."

Ferdinand, who received the title of Tsar when Bulgaria became independent from the Ottoman Empire in 1908, married for the second time in 1908 in Coburg to Princess Eleonore Reuss of Köstritz. No children were born from this second marriage.

== Children ==
- Prince Boris of Bulgaria (30 January 1894 – 28 August 1943), Prince of Turnovo and Tsar 1918–1943 (as Boris III)
- Prince Kiril of Bulgaria (17 November 1895 – 1 February 1945), Prince of Preslav
- Princess Eudoxia of Bulgaria (5 January 1898 – 4 October 1985)
- Princess Nadezhda of Bulgaria (30 January 1899 – 15 February 1958), married Duke Albrecht Eugen of Württemberg

== See also ==
- Royal Consorts of Bulgaria
