= Ferdinand I of Bulgaria =

Prince/Tsar of Bulgaria from 1887 to 1918

Ferdinand I: Фердинанд I
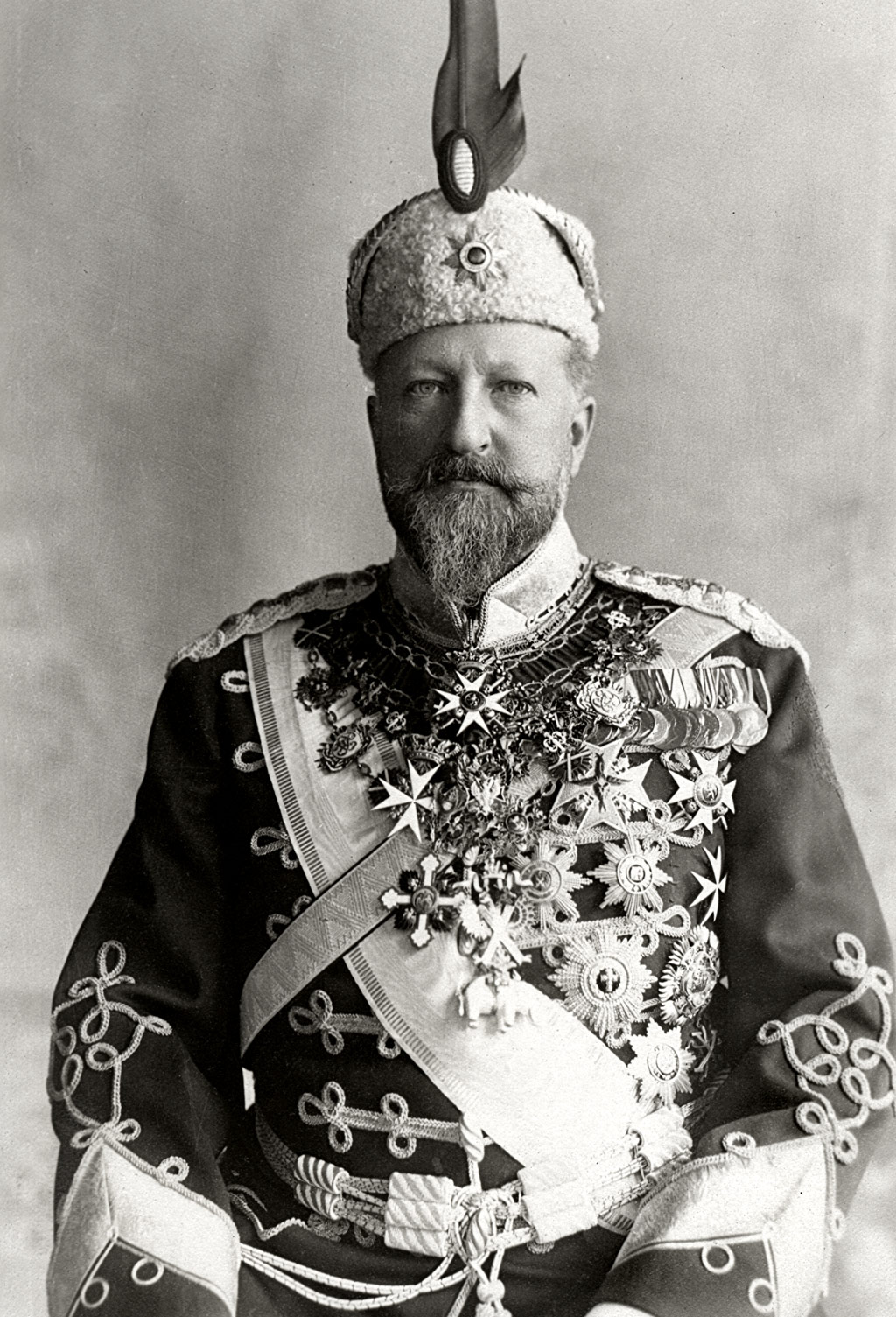
- Ferdinand I in 1912

Tsar of Bulgaria
- Reign: 5 October 1908 – 3 October 1918
- Predecessor: Himself (as Prince)
- Successor: Boris III

Prince of Bulgaria
- Reign: 7 July 1887 – 5 October 1908
- Predecessor: Alexander
- Successor: Himself (as Tsar)
- Born: 26 February 1861; Vienna, Austrian Empire
- Died: 10 September 1948 (aged 87); Coburg, Germany (Note: Germany was under Allied occupation at the time of Ferdinand's death.)
- Burial: St. Augustin, Coburg (1948–2024); Vrana Palace, Bulgaria (since 2024)
- Spouses: Marie Louise of Bourbon-Parma (m. 1893; died 1899); Eleonore Reuss of Köstritz (m. 1908; died 1917); Alžbeta Brezáková (m. 1947)
- Issue: Boris III of Bulgaria; Kiril, Prince of Preslav; Princess Eudoxia; Nadezhda, Duchess Albrecht Eugen of Württemberg
Names
- German: Ferdinand Maximilian Karl Leopold Maria; Bulgarian: Фердинанд Максимилиан Карл Леополд Мария Сакскобургготски
- House: Saxe-Coburg and Gotha-Koháry
- Father: Prince August of Saxe-Coburg and Gotha
- Mother: Princess Clémentine of Orléans

Ferdinand I (Ferdinand Maximilian Karl Leopold Maria; 26 February 1861 – 10 September 1948) (Note: Bulgarian: Фердинанд I Български, or Фердинанд Максимилиан Карл Леополд Мария Сакскобургготски) was the monarch of Bulgaria from 1887 to 1918, reigning as Prince of Bulgaria from 1887 to 1908 and Tsar of Bulgaria from 1908 until his abdication in 1918. Under his rule, Bulgaria began rapidly modernising its industry, military, infrastructure and culture. It achieved independence from the Ottoman Empire and fought in the Balkan Wars and World War I, the latter of which ended with the catastrophic Treaty of Neuilly-sur-Seine and prompted Ferdinand's abdication.

== Family background ==
Ferdinand was born on 26 February 1861 in Vienna, a German prince of the House of Saxe-Coburg and Gotha-Koháry. He was the son of Prince August of Saxe-Coburg and his wife Clémentine of Orléans, daughter of King Louis Philippe I of France. Princess Maria Antonia Koháry was a Hungarian noble and heiress who married Ferdinand's grandfather, Prince Ferdinand of Saxe-Coburg and Gotha. Ferdinand was raised in his parents’ Catholic faith and baptised in St. Stephen's Cathedral, Vienna, on 27 February, having as godparents Archduke Maximilian of Austria and his wife Princess Charlotte of Belgium. He grew up in the cosmopolitan environment of Austro-Hungarian high nobility and also in their ancestral lands in Hungary and in Germany. The House of Koháry descended from an immensely wealthy Upper Hungarian noble family, who held the princely lands of Čabraď and Sitno in present-day Slovakia, among others. The family's property was augmented by Clémentine of Orléans' remarkable dowry.

Ferdinand was a grandnephew of Ernest I, Duke of Saxe-Coburg and Gotha and of Leopold I, first king of the Belgians. His father August was a brother of King Ferdinand II of Portugal, and also a first cousin to Queen Victoria, her husband Albert, Empress Carlota of Mexico and her brother Leopold II of Belgium. These last two, Leopold and Carlota, were also first cousins of Ferdinand I's through his mother, a princess of Orléans. This made the Belgian siblings his first cousins, as well as his first cousins once removed. Indeed, the House of Saxe-Coburg and Gotha had contrived to occupy, either by marriage or by direct election, several European thrones in the course of the 19th century. Following the family trend, Ferdinand was himself to found the royal dynasty of Bulgaria.

== Prince of Bulgaria ==
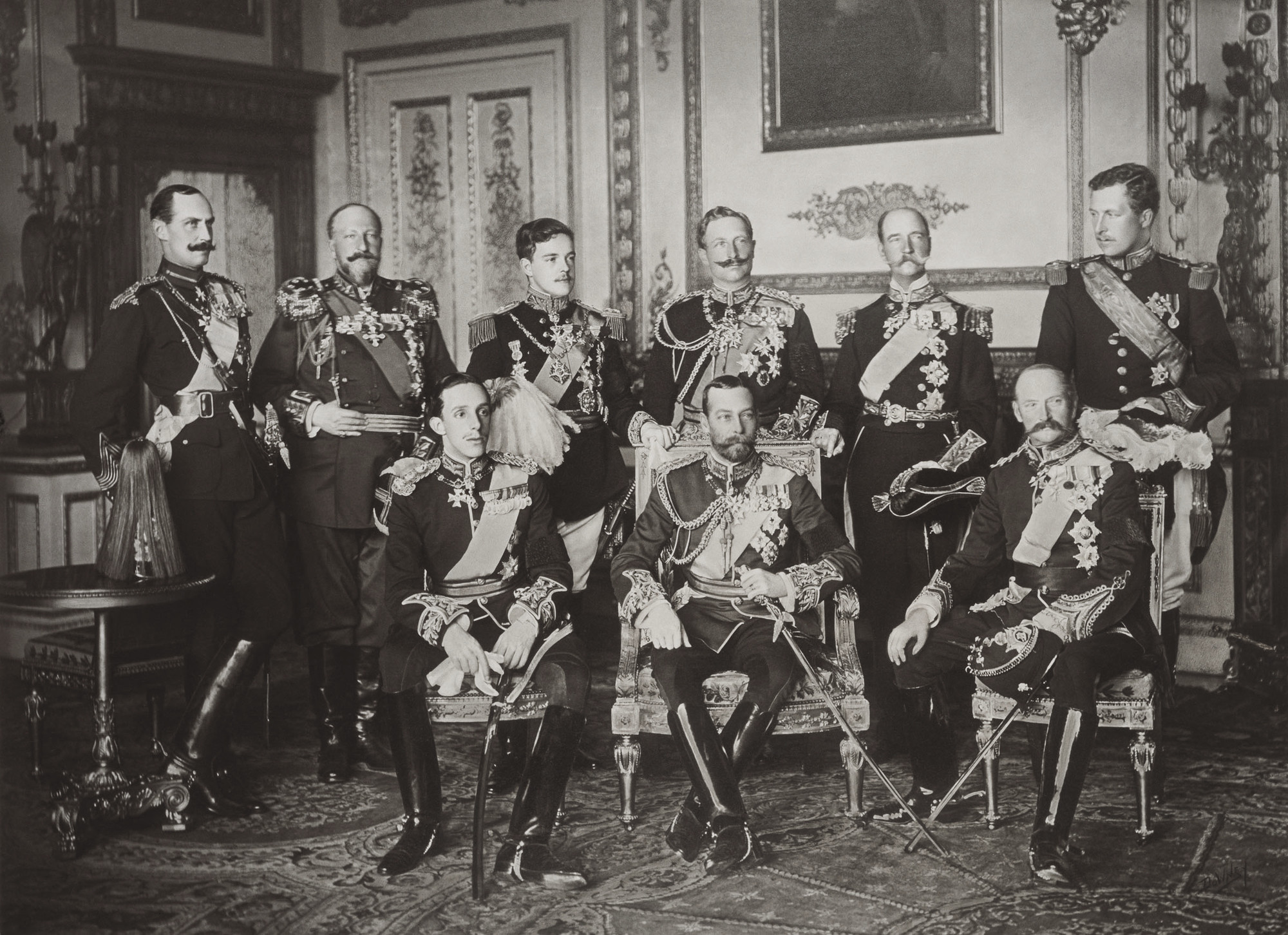
The Nine Sovereigns at Windsor for the funeral of King Edward VII, photographed on 20 May 1910. Standing, from left to right: King Haakon VII of Norway, Tsar Ferdinand of the Bulgarians, King Manuel II of Portugal and the Algarve, Kaiser Wilhelm II of Germany and Prussia, King George I of the Hellenes and King Albert I of the Belgians. Seated, from left to right: King Alfonso XIII of Spain, King George V of the United Kingdom and King Frederick VIII of Denmark.

The previous ruling prince of Bulgaria, Alexander of Battenberg, had abdicated in 1886 after a pro-Russian coup, only seven years after he had been elected. Ferdinand, who was an officer in the Austro-Hungarian Army, was elected Prince of autonomous Bulgaria by its Grand National Assembly on 7 July 1887 in the Gregorian calendar (the "New Style" used hereinafter). The throne had been previously offered, before Ferdinand's acceptance, to princes from Denmark to the Caucasus and even to the King of Romania. The Russian tsar himself had nominated his aide, Nichols Dadian of Mingrelia, but his candidacy was rejected by the Bulgarians. Ferdinand's accession was greeted with disbelief in many of the royal houses of Europe; Queen Victoria, his father's first cousin, stated to her prime minister, "He is totally unfit ... delicate, eccentric and effeminate ... Should be stopped at once." To the amazement of his initial detractors, Ferdinand generally gave a good account of himself during the first two decades of his reign. Princess Beatrice of Bourbon, a first cousin of Ferdinand's first wife, described him as "likable, though it’s a pity he speaks that way."

Bulgaria's domestic political life was dominated during the early years of Ferdinand's reign by liberal party leader Stefan Stambolov, whose foreign policy saw a marked cooling in relations with Russia, formerly seen as Bulgaria's protector.

Stambolov's fall (May 1894) and subsequent assassination (July 1895) — probably not engineered by Ferdinand — paved the way for a reconciliation of Bulgaria with Russia, effected in February 1896 with Ferdinand's decision to convert his infant son, Prince Boris, from Roman Catholicism to Eastern Orthodoxy. However, this earned him the animosity of his Catholic Austrian relatives, and he was excommunicated by Pope Leo XIII.

== Tsar of Bulgaria ==
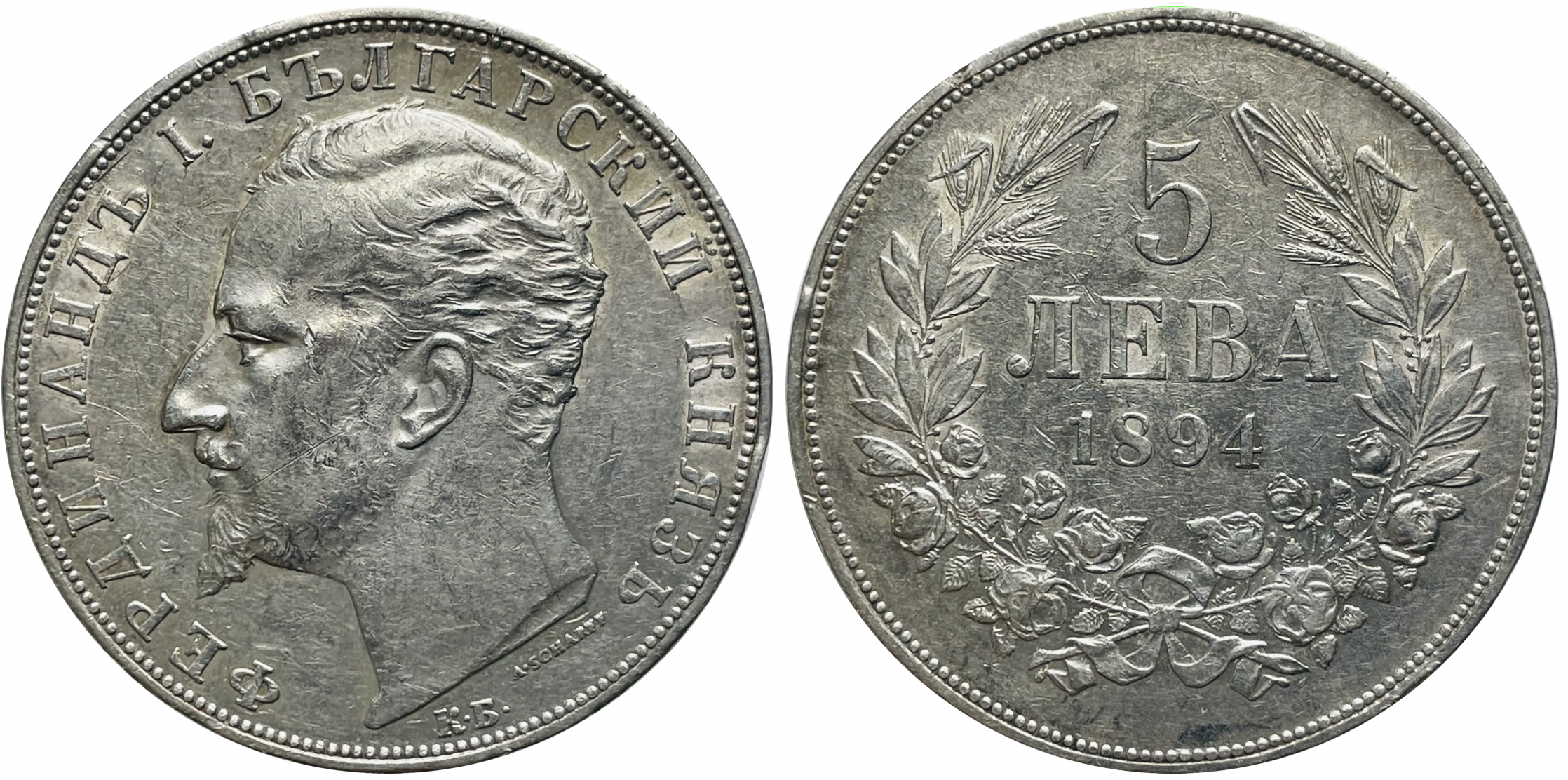
Silver coin: 5 leva, Ferdinand I, 1894

On 5 October 1908 (celebrated on 22 September), Prince Ferdinand proclaimed Bulgaria's de jure independence from the Ottoman Empire (though the country had been de facto independent since 1878), as a kingdom, and assumed the title of tsar—a deliberate nod to the rulers of the earlier Bulgarian states. However, while the title tsar was equivalent to the rank of "basileos" in the First and Second Bulgarian Tsardoms, its modern equivalent translates to "king". The Bulgarian Declaration of Independence was proclaimed by the Tsar at the Holy Forty Martyrs Church in Tarnovo, and was recognized by the Ottoman Empire and the other European powers. The Tarnovo Constitution was retained, with the word "prince" replaced by the word "tsar."

Enjoying his independent title, the Tsar assumed various travels across Europe, some of which leave anecdotal evidence of his flamboyant personality. Thus, on a visit to the German Emperor Wilhelm II, his second cousin once removed, in 1909, Tsar Ferdinand was leaning out of a window of the New Palace in Potsdam when the Emperor came up behind him and slapped him on the bottom. Naturally, the Bulgarian ruler was affronted by the gesture, but the Kaiser refused to apologise. The Tsar exacted his revenge by awarding a valuable arms contract he had intended to give to the Krupp's factory in Essen to French arms manufacturer Schneider-Creusot. In May 1910, the Tsar attended the burial of Edward VII, taking part in the funeral procession that was to bring the 9 Monarchs of Europe together for the last time before the Great War broke out. Prior to arriving in London, a tussle broke out over where the Tsar’s private railway carriage would be positioned in relation to the heir presumptive to the Austro-Hungarian throne, Archduke Franz Ferdinand. The Archduke won out, having his carriage positioned directly behind the engine, with that of the Bulgarian king being placed directly behind his. Realising the dining car of the train was behind his own carriage, however, Tsar Ferdinand obtained his revenge on the Archduke by refusing him passage through his own carriage to the dining car. On June 23 1910, Tsar Ferdinand was received in Paris by the President of the Republic Armand Fallières to the chants of the gathered crowds: “Vive le Roi!” - a chant that was made all the more poignant by the fact that the Tsar was the grandson of the ultimate French King - Louis Philippe, through his mother princess Clementine d’Orleans. On 15 July the same year during a visit to Belgium, Tsar Ferdinand became the first head of state in the world to fly in an airplane. He awarded the pilot of the plane with a medal when they landed.

== Balkan Wars (1912–1913) ==
In 1912, Tsar Ferdinand I and his country joined Greece, Montenegro and Serbia in an assault on the Ottoman Empire in a shared effort to redistribute the European domains of the Ottomans. The Tsar saw the war as a new crusade declaring it in his manifesto, "a just, great and sacred struggle of the Cross against the Crescent." As the war progressed, Bulgaria was able to push back the Ottomans to the Chataldzha line, and conquer Adrianople on the 13 March 1913, effectively ending the First Balkan War. However, in the London peace conference that followed, the Great Powers insisted on the creation of an independent Albania and did not secure common understanding of how the new borders should be drawn between the Balkan states. This caused frictions between Serbia, Bulgaria and Greece over the way Macedonia should be shared between them, over Thessaloniki, as well as the Aegean islands of Thassos and Samothraki. The independence of Albania dramatically altered Serbia’s understanding of fair outcome for its war efforts and it sought to compensate in Macedonia at the expense of Bulgaria. The Second Balkan War broke out when tensions between Bulgaria, Serbia and Greece over the disputed areas could no longer be resolved diplomatically. Although the original Serbian-Bulgarian treaty had envisioned a Russian Arbitrage in the event of a dispute between the two countries, the tensions over the negotiating process could no longer be resolved peacefully, and Serbia had already discussed a military alliance against Bulgaria with Greece. In the ensuing war, Bulgaria was defeated, yet the 1913 Treaty of Bucharest granted the Kingdom some territorial gains. The region of Western Thrace, giving access to the Aegean Sea was secured.

== First World War and abdication (1915–1918) ==
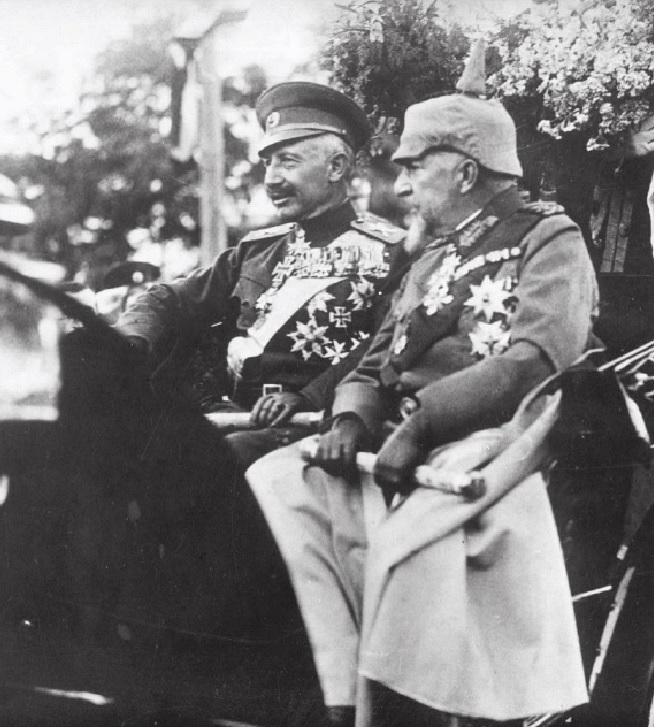
Emperor Wilhelm and Tsar Ferdinand in Sofia, 1916

On 11 October 1915, the Bulgarian army attacked Serbia after signing a treaty with Austria-Hungary and Germany stating that Bulgaria would gain the territory it sought at the expense of Serbia. While he was not an admirer of German Emperor Wilhelm II or Austrian Emperor Franz Josef I—whom he described as "that idiot, that old dotard of a Francis Joseph"—Ferdinand wanted additional territorial gains after the humiliation of the Balkan Wars. This also entailed forming an alliance with his former enemy, the Ottoman Empire. This ranging of his country with the Central Powers made him a de facto supporter of Germany's war aims and was not well received by the Allies. Edmund Gosse wrote:

In this war, where the ranks of the enemy present to us so many formidable, sinister, and shocking figures, there is one, and perhaps but one, which is purely ridiculous. If we had the heart to relieve our strained feelings by laughter, it would be at the gross Coburg traitor, with his bodyguard of assassins and his hidden coat-of-mail, his shaking hands and his painted face. The world has never seen a meaner scoundrel, and we may almost bring ourselves to pity the Kaiser, whom circumstances have forced to accept on equal terms a potentate so verminous.

During the initial phase of World War I, the Tsardom of Bulgaria achieved several decisive victories over its enemies and laid claim to the disputed territories of Macedonia after Serbia's defeat. For the next two years, the Bulgarian army shifted its focus towards repelling Allied advances from nearby Greece. They were also partially involved in the 1916 conquest of neighboring Romania, now ruled by another Ferdinand I, who was also Ferdinand's first cousin once removed.

To save the Bulgarian monarchy after multiple military setbacks in 1918, Tsar Ferdinand abdicated in favour of his eldest son, who became Tsar Boris III on 3 October 1918. Under new leadership, Bulgaria surrendered to the Entente and, as a consequence, lost not only the additional territory it had fought for in the major conflict, but also the territory it had won after the Balkan Wars giving access to the Aegean Sea.

== Personal life ==
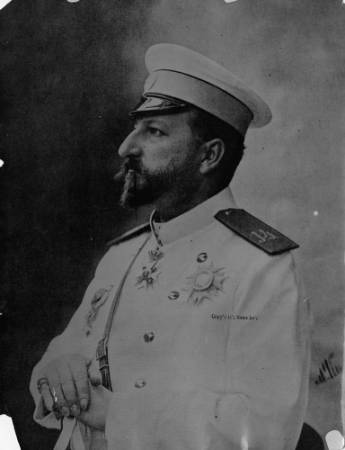
WWI-era portrait of Ferdinand I

According to her memoirs, Ferdinand I was vehemently in love with Archduchess Louise of Austria, and proposed marriage to her, but she refused:

Let me assure you at once that I do not and could not love you, and should not be happy as your wife. I quite realise your worldly advantages, but you would never be able to give me real happiness. I'm sure you only want to marry me because I am an Austrian Archduchess; the word Archduchess stands for love in your vocabulary, and you have promised your ministers to return to Bulgaria betrothed to me. Well I shall not marry you. You'd better go to the Duke of Parma and ask him for my cousin, Marie-Louise.

Ferdinand married Princess Marie Louise of Bourbon-Parma, daughter of Robert I, Duke of Parma and Princess Maria Pia of Bourbon-Two Sicilies, on 20 April 1893 at the Villa Pianore in Lucca. Steven Constant describes this as a "marriage of convenience". The marriage produced four children:

- Boris III (1894–1943)
- Kyril (1895–1945)
- Eudoxia (1898–1985)
- Nadezhda (1899–1958).

Princess Beatrice of Bourbon discribed the wedding in a letter to her brother Jaime:

We—that is to say, Papa, Elvira, Alicia, myself, and the ladies—went into the boys’ study rooms, and from there we watched the wedding procession pass by. The area in front of the chapel had been specially arranged, using the courtyard between the two houses as a backdrop, complete with a beautiful façade designed in the style of Lucca. [...] Inside the chapel were: Aunt Marie-Antoinette, Uncle Robert, Aunt Aldegonde, Uncle Henri, Louis of Cobourg, old Clémentine, Clotilde, Philippe of Saxe-Coburg and Gotha, Princess Amélie of Bavaria, the Duke and Duchess of La Grazia, Luisa Pia, and Béatrice of Parma. He said "yes" in a very brief and precise manner; as for her, she could barely be heard—she was deeply moved.

Marie Louise died on 31 January 1899 after giving birth to her youngest daughter. Ferdinand did not think about remarriage until his mother, Princess Clémentine, died in 1907. To satisfy dynastic obligations and to provide his children with a mother figure, Ferdinand married Princess Eleonore Reuss of Köstritz, on 28 February 1908. Neither romantic love or physical attraction played any role, and Ferdinand treated her as no more than a member of the household, and showed scant regard.

In his private relations, Ferdinand was a somewhat hedonistic individual. He enjoyed affairs with a number of women of humble position, siring a number of illegitimate children whom he then supported financially. In his later life, rumours abounded of Ferdinand's trysts with lieutenants and valets. His regular holidays on Capri, then a popular holiday destination with wealthy epicenes, were common knowledge in royal courts throughout Europe.

He was remembered in his cousin's memoir:

Prince Ferdinand, who was a Coburg, was a cousin of my father’s, and I remember the latter saying, when we got back to the hotel, that being the youngest of his family he was naturally looked upon as a fool, "But," said my father, "for the fool of the family he has not done so badly for himself and I should not be surprised if he did not prove them all to be wrong." He was always mocked at by his relations for covering himself with orders and decorations created by himself, and he was rudely nicknamed “the Christmas-tree.”

== Exile and death (1918–1948) ==
After his abdication, Ferdinand returned to live in Coburg, Germany. He had managed to salvage much of his fortune and was able to live in some style. He saw his being in exile simply as one of the hazards of kingship. He commented, "Kings in exile are more philosophic under reverses than ordinary individuals; but our philosophy is primarily the result of tradition and breeding, and do not forget that pride is an important item in the making of a monarch. We are disciplined from the day of our birth and taught the avoidance of all outward signs of emotion. The skeleton sits forever with us at the feast. It may mean murder, it may mean abdication, but it serves always to remind us of the unexpected. Therefore we are prepared and nothing comes in the nature of a catastrophe. The main thing in life is to support any condition of bodily or spiritual exile with dignity. If one sups with sorrow, one need not invite the world to see you eat." He was pleased that the throne could pass to his son. Ferdinand was not displeased with exile and spent much of his time devoted to artistic endeavors, gardening, travel and natural history. In 1922 the Bulgarian government gave former King Ferdinand I, who had been living in exile since 1918, permission to return to Sofia. The Kingdom of Yugoslavia immediately sent an ultimatum objecting to the move.

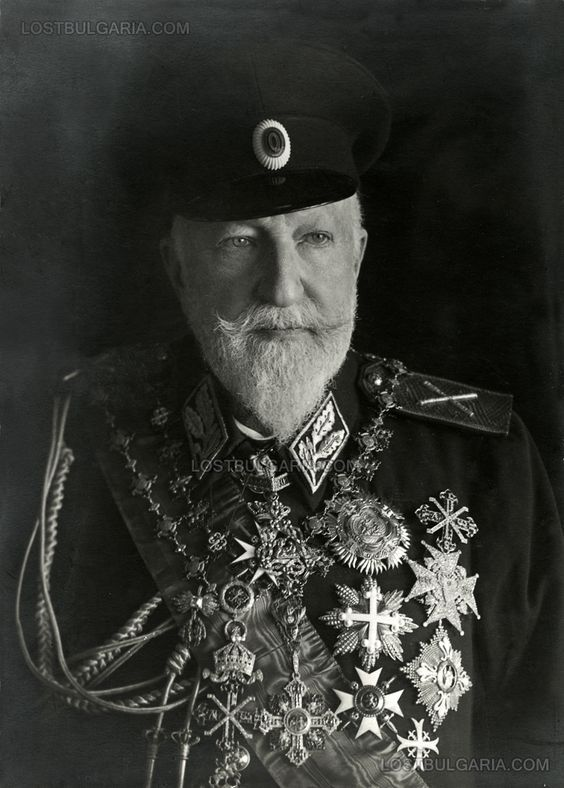
Ferdinand in Bulgarian field marshal's uniform, 1941

However, he would live to see the collapse of everything he had held to be precious in life. His eldest son and successor, Boris III, died under mysterious circumstances after returning from a visit to Hitler in Germany in 1943. Boris' son, Simeon II, succeeded him only to be deposed in 1946, ending the Bulgarian monarchy. The Kingdom of Bulgaria was succeeded by the People's Republic of Bulgaria, under which Ferdinand's other son, Kyril, was executed. On hearing of Kyril's death he said, "Everything is collapsing around me."

Ferdinand died in Bürglass-Schlösschen on 10 September 1948 in Coburg, Germany, cradle of the Saxe-Coburg-Gotha dynasty. He was the last surviving grandchild of Louis-Philippe of France. His final wish was to be buried in Bulgaria. However, the Communist authorities in Bulgaria would not allow it, so he was buried in the family crypt in St. Augustin, Coburg.

On 29 May 2024, Ferdinand's remains were transported from Coburg to Sofia by a military plane, which landed at Sofia Airport. They were transported in accordance with the decision adopted by the Council of Ministers. The coffin was taken down and carried by national guards and solemnly placed in a hearse which left for the royal Vrana Palace on the outskirts of Sofia, where Ferdinand was buried.

== Honours ==
Styles of King Ferdinand I of Bulgaria
- Reference style: His Majesty
- Spoken style: Your Majesty

=== Bulgarian ===
- Grand Cross of St. Alexander, in Diamonds, 27 May 1883
- Founder and Grand Master of the Civil Merit Order, 1891
- Founder and Grand Master of the Military Merit Order, 19 May 1900
- Founder and Grand Master of the Order of Saints Cyril and Methodius, 18 May 1909

=== Foreign ===
Arms of Ferdinand I as knight of the Austrian branch of the Order of the Golden Fleece

- (Albanian Kingdom (1928–1939)) Albanian royal family:
  - Knight of the Order of Albania, with Collar
  - Grand Cross of the Order of Fidelity, Special Class
- (Austrian Empire) (Kingdom of Hungary) Austro-Hungarian imperial and royal family:
  - Grand Cross of the Royal Hungarian Order of St. Stephen, with Collar, 1899; in Diamonds, 1917
  - Knight of the Golden Fleece, with Collar, 1911
  - Military Merit Cross, 3rd Class with War Decoration, 1915
  - Grand Cross of the Military Order of Maria Theresa, with Collar, 1917
- (Kingdom of Bavaria) Bavarian royal family:
  - Knight of St. Hubert, 1896
  - Grand Cross of the Military Order of Max Joseph
- Belgium: Grand Cordon of the Order of Leopold
- (Empire of Brazil) Brazilian imperial family: Grand Cross of the Rose, with Collar
- Denmark: Knight of the Elephant, with Collar, 20 May 1910
- (Saxe-Coburg and Gotha) (Duchy of Saxe-Altenburg) (Saxe-Meiningen) Ernestine ducal families:
  - Grand Cross of the Saxe-Ernestine House Order, 1879
  - Knight of the Order of Saint Joachim, 1888
- France: Grand Officer of the Legion of Honour, 1905
  - (Kingdom of France) French royal family:
    - Knight of St. Michael
    - Grand Cross of St. Lazarus, with Collar
- (Grand Duchy of Hesse) Hessian grand ducal family: Grand Cross of the Ludwig Order, 28 November 1893
- (Kingdom of Italy) Italian royal family:
  - Knight of the Annunciation, with Collar, 10 July 1897
  - Grand Cross of Saints Maurice and Lazarus
  - Grand Cross of the Crown of Italy
  - (Duchy of Parma) Parmese ducal family: Senator Grand Cross of the Constantinian Order of St. George, 1893
  - (Kingdom of the Two Sicilies) Two Sicilian royal family: Knight of St. Januarius
- Sovereign Military Order of Malta: Bailiff Grand Cross of Justice, 1st Class
- Monaco: Grand Cross of St. Charles, 11 May 1892
- (Kingdom of Portugal) Portuguese royal family:
  - Grand Cross of the Sash of the Two Orders, 17 July 1886
  - Grand Cross of the Tower and Sword, 17 July 1886
- (Kingdom of Prussia) Prussian royal family:
  - Grand Cross of the Red Eagle, with Collar, 2 May 1896
  - Knight of the Black Eagle, with Collar
  - Iron Cross (1914), 2nd and 1st Classes
  - Pour le Mérite (military), with Oak Leaves, 8 September 1916
- (Kingdom of Romania) Romanian royal family: Collar of the Order of Carol I
- (Russian Empire) Russian imperial family:
  - Knight of St. Andrew, with Collar, 1907
  - Knight of St. Alexander Nevsky, 10 February 1910
  - Knight of the White Eagle
  - Knight of St. Anna, 1st Class
  - Knight of St. Vladimir, 1st Class
- (Restoration (Spain)) Spanish royal family: Grand Commander of the Order of Calatrava
- Sweden: Knight of the Seraphim, with Collar, 28 June 1937
- (Ottoman Empire) Turkish imperial family:
  - Order of Distinction in Diamonds, 26 March 1896
  - Exalted Order of Honour, 1915
- United Kingdom:
  - Queen Victoria Diamond Jubilee Medal, 1897
  - Honorary Grand Cross of the Royal Victorian Order, 6 September 1904
  - Honorary Grand Cross of the Bath (civil), 7 March 1905
- (Kingdom of Württemberg) Württemberg royal family: Grand Cross of the Military Merit Order

=== Honorary military appointments ===
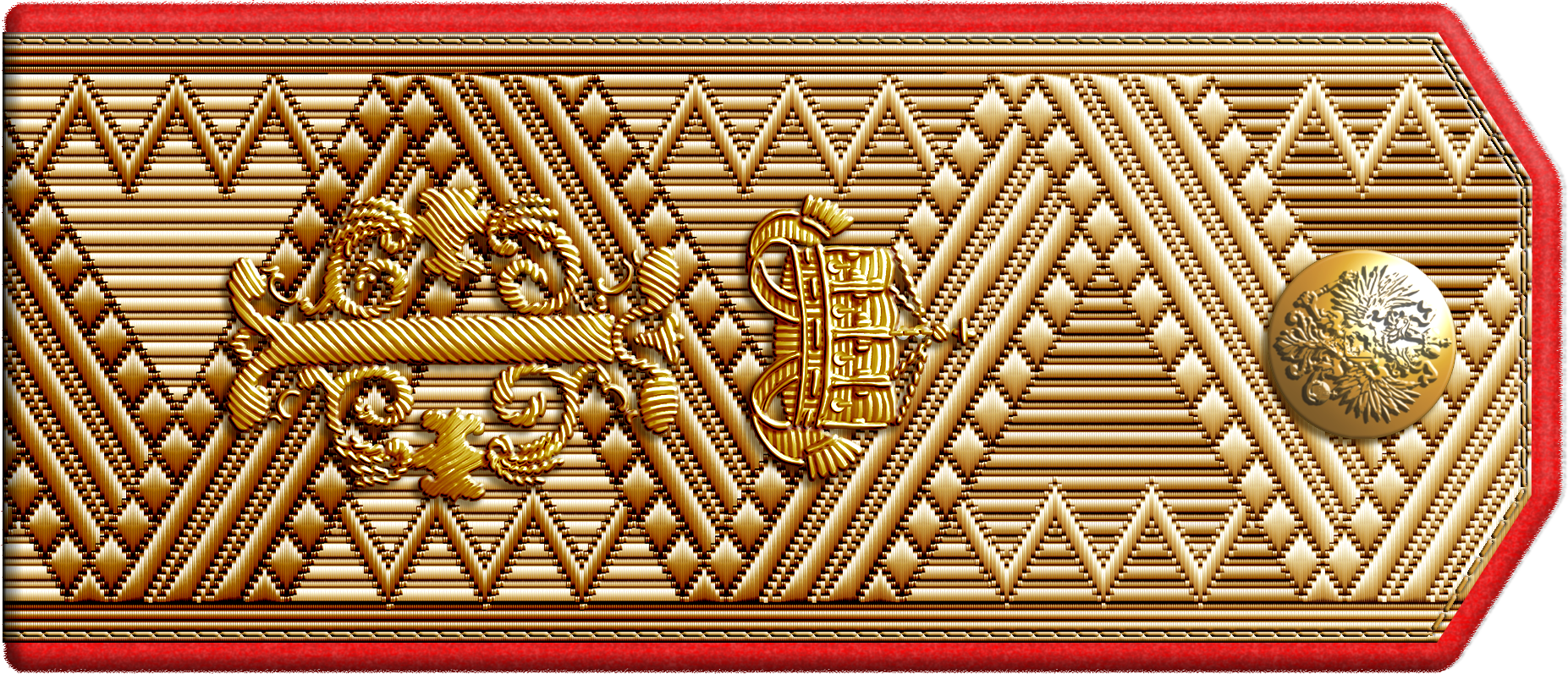
General of infantry shoulder straps, сhef of 54th Minsk Infantry Regiment, 1902-1912

- Russian Empire: Colonel of the 54th Minsk Regiment, 1902

== See also ==
- Order of Saints Cyril and Methodius

== Books ==
- Aronson, Theo (1986). Crowns In Conflict: The Triumph And The Tragedy Of European Monarchy, 1910–1918. London: J.Murray. ISBN 0-7195-4279-0.
- Constant, Stephen (1986). Foxy Ferdinand, 1861–1948, Tsar of Bulgaria. London: Sidgwick and Jackson. ISBN 0-283-98515-1.
- Louda, Jiri; Michael Maclagan (1981). Lines of Succession. London: Orbis Publishing Ltd. ISBN 0-460-04519-9.
- Macdonald, John (1913). Czar Ferdinand and His People. London: T.C. & E.C. Jack.
- Madol, Hans Roger (1933). Ferdinand of Bulgaria: The Dream of Byzantium. London: Hurst & Blackett.
- Massie, Robert K (1981). The Last Courts of Europe. London: J.M.Dent & Sons Ltd. ISBN 0-460-04519-9.
- Palmer, Alan (1978). The Kaiser: Warlord Of The Second Reich. London: Weidenfeld and Nicolson. ISBN 0-297-77393-3.

Ferdinand I of Bulgaria House of Saxe-Coburg and Gotha Cadet branch of the House of Wettin Born: 26 February 1861 Died: 10 September 1948
Regnal titles
Preceded by Alexander	Prince of Bulgaria; 7 July 1887 – 5 October 1908	Proclaimed tsar De jure independence
Vacant Ottoman rule Title last held by Constantine II	Tsar of Bulgaria; 5 October 1908 – 3 October 1918	Succeeded by Boris III
Political offices
Preceded by Alexander	Governor-general of Eastern Rumelia; 7 July 1887 – 5 October 1908	Proclaimed tsar Bulgarian independence
