= Boris III of Bulgaria =

Tsar of Bulgaria from 1918 to 1943

Boris III: Борѝс III
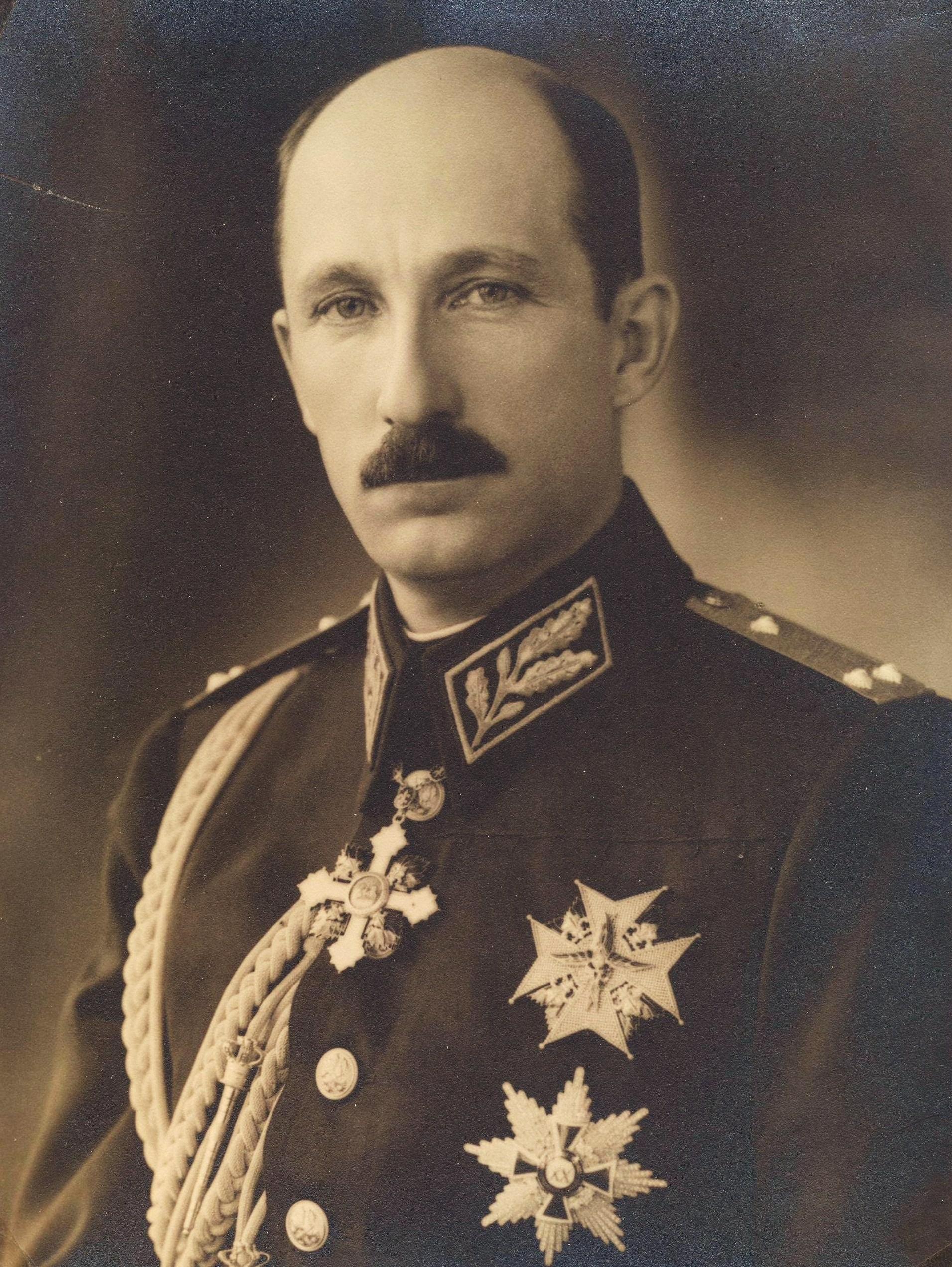
- Formal portrait, c. 1918–1919

Tsar of Bulgaria
- Reign: 3 October 1918 – 28 August 1943
- Predecessor: Ferdinand I
- Successor: Simeon II
- Born: 30 January 1894; Royal Palace, Sofia, Bulgaria
- Died: 28 August 1943 (aged 49); Sofia, Bulgaria
- Burial: Rila Monastery
- Spouse: Giovanna of Savoy (m. 1930)
- Issue: Marie Louise, Princess of Koháry; Simeon II
Names
- Boris Klemens Robert Maria Pius Ludwig Stanislaus Xaver
- Bulgarian: Борис III
- House: Saxe-Coburg and Gotha-Koháry
- Father: Ferdinand I of Bulgaria
- Mother: Marie Louise of Bourbon-Parma

Boris III (Note: Bulgarian: Борѝс III; Boris Treti) (Boris Klemens Robert Maria Pius Ludwig Stanislaus Xaver; 30 January [O.S. 18 January] 1894 – 28 August 1943) was Tsar of Bulgaria from 1918 until his death in 1943.

The eldest son of Ferdinand I, Boris assumed the throne upon the abdication of his father in the wake of Bulgaria's defeat in World War I. Under the 1919 Treaty of Neuilly, Bulgaria was forced to cede various territories, pay crippling war reparations, and greatly reduce the size of its military. That same year, Aleksandar Stamboliyski of the Bulgarian Agrarian National Union became prime minister. After Stamboliyski was overthrown in a coup in 1923, Boris recognized the new government of Aleksandar Tsankov, who harshly suppressed the Bulgarian Communist Party and led the nation through a brief border war with Greece. Tsankov was removed from power in 1926, and a series of prime ministers followed until 1934, when the corporatist Zveno (Bulgarian: Звено) movement staged a coup and outlawed all political parties. Boris opposed the Zveno government and overthrew them in 1935, eventually installing Georgi Kyoseivanov as prime minister. For the remainder of his reign, Boris would rule as a de facto absolute monarch, with his prime ministers largely submitting to his will.

Following the outbreak of World War II, Bulgaria initially remained neutral. In 1940, Nazi sympathizer Bogdan Filov replaced Kyoseivanov as prime minister, becoming the last prime minister to serve under Boris. In September 1940, with the support of Nazi Germany, Bulgaria received the region of Southern Dobrudja from Romania as part of the Treaty of Craiova. In January 1941, Boris approved the antisemitic Law for Protection of the Nation, which denied citizenship to Bulgarian Jews and placed numerous restrictions upon them. In March 1941, Bulgaria joined the Axis and allowed German troops to use Bulgaria as a base from which to invade Yugoslavia and Greece. Bulgaria then received large portions of Yugoslav Macedonia, Pirot County in eastern Serbia and Greek Thrace, which were key targets of Bulgarian irredentism. Bulgaria opted out of participation in the German invasion of the Soviet Union, as allowed by the provisions of the Axis alliance. As part of the Holocaust, Bulgarian authorities deported most Jews from occupied Greek and Yugoslav territories and transferred them to the German extermination camp of Treblinka. Under public pressure, Boris cancelled the deportation of Bulgarian Jews while expelling almost 20,000 Jews to the Bulgarian countryside to be deployed in forced labour camps. In 1942, Zveno, the Agrarian National Union, the Bulgarian Communist Party, and other far-left groups united to form a resistance movement known as the Fatherland Front, which went on to overthrow the government in 1944. In August 1943, shortly after returning from a visit to Germany, Boris died at the age of 49. Following his death, he was succeeded as Tsar by his six-year-old son, Simeon Borisov Saxe-Coburg-Gotha (Bulgarian: Симеон Борисов Сакскобургготски), who ascended the throne as Simeon II.

== Early life ==
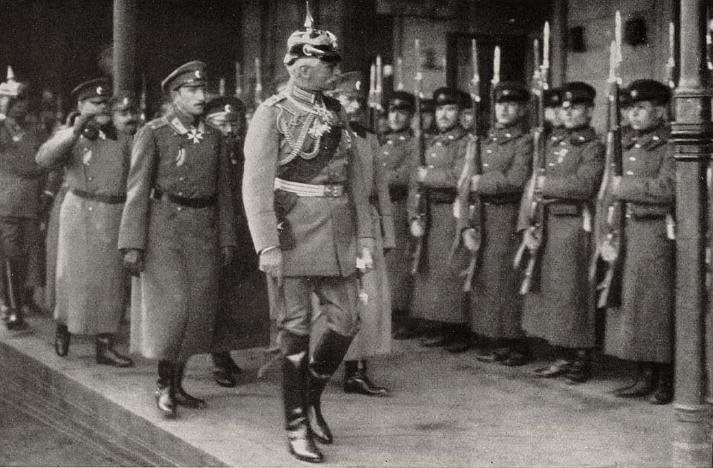
Crown Prince Boris (2nd from left) and German field marshal Mackensen reviewing a Bulgarian regiment accompanied by the Commander in Chief General Zhekov and the Chief of Staff Army General Zhostov during World War I

Boris was born on 30 January 1894 in Sofia to Ferdinand I, Prince of Bulgaria, and his wife Princess Marie Louise of Bourbon-Parma.

In February 1896, his father paved the way for the reconciliation of Bulgaria and Russia with the conversion of the infant Prince Boris from Catholicism to Eastern Orthodoxy, a move that earned Ferdinand the frustration of his wife, the animosity of his Catholic Austrian relatives (particularly his uncle Franz Joseph I of Austria) and excommunication by Pope Leo XIII. In order to remedy this difficult situation, Ferdinand had his subsequent children baptised in the Catholic Church. Nicholas II of Russia stood as godfather to Boris and later met the young boy during Ferdinand's official visit to Saint Petersburg in 1897.

He received his initial education in the so-called Palace Secondary School, which Ferdinand had founded in 1908 solely for his sons. Later, Boris graduated from the Military School in Sofia, then took part in the Balkan Wars. During the First World War, he served as liaison officer of the General Staff of the Bulgarian Army on the Macedonian front. In 1916, he was promoted to colonel and attached again as liaison officer to Army Group Mackensen and the Bulgarian Third Army for the operations against Romania. Boris worked hard to smooth the sometimes difficult relations between Field Marshal Mackensen and Lieutenant General Stefan Toshev, the commander of the Third Army. Through his courage and personal example, he earned the respect of the troops and the senior Bulgarian and German commanders, even that of the Generalquartiermeister of the German Army, Erich Ludendorff, who preferred dealing personally with Boris and described him as excellently trained, a thoroughly soldierly person and mature beyond his years. In 1918, Boris was made a major general.

== Early reign ==
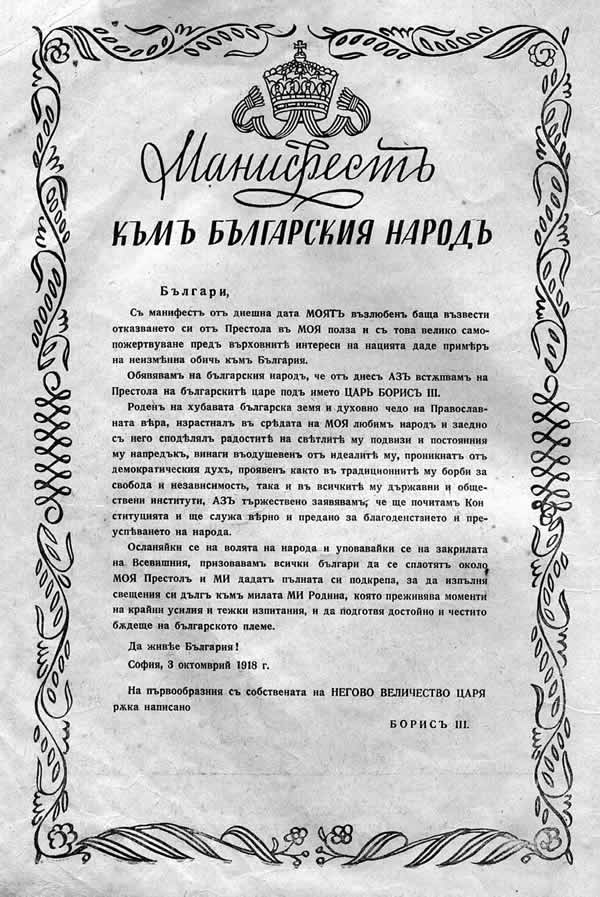
King Boris' manifesto of ascension to the throne

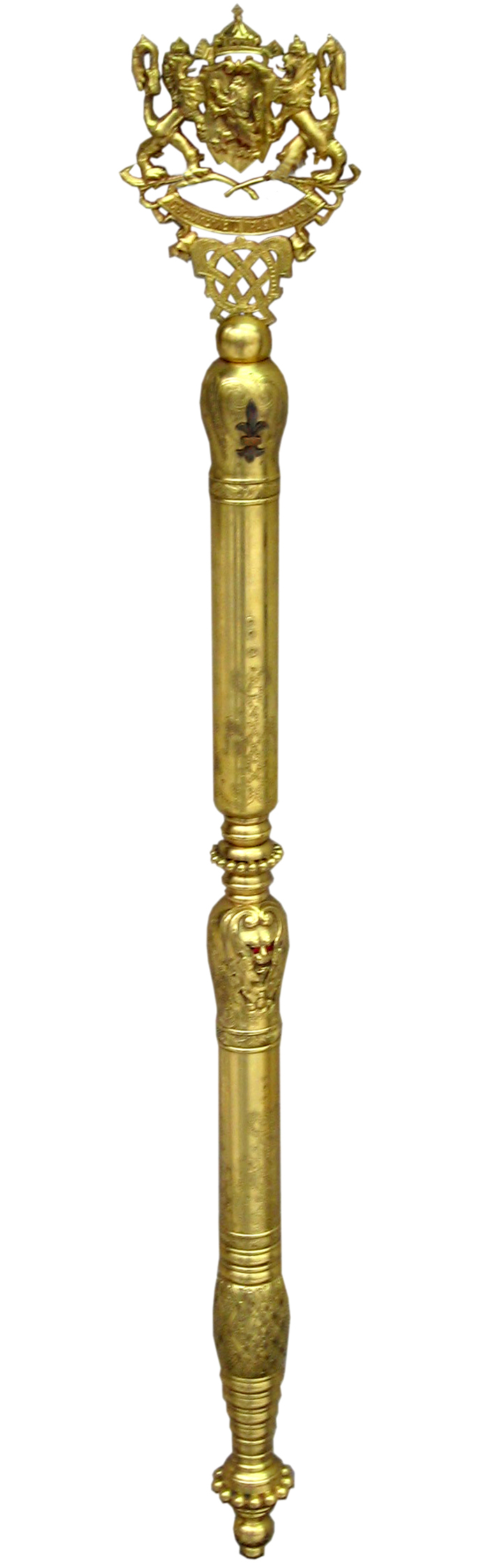
The Royal Sceptre of Boris III

In September 1918, Bulgaria was defeated in the Vardar Offensive and forced to sue for peace. Ferdinand abdicated in favour of Boris, who became Tsar on 3 October 1918.

A year after Boris's accession, Aleksandar Stamboliyski (also Stambolijski) of the Bulgarian Agrarian National Union was elected prime minister. Though popular with the large peasant class, Stambolijski earned the animosity of the middle class and military, which led to his toppling in a military coup on 9 June 1923 and assassination. On 14 April 1925, an anarchist group attacked Boris's cavalcade as it passed through the Arabakonak Pass. Two days later, a bomb killed 213 members and wounded another 500 of Bulgaria's political and military elite in Sofia as they attended the funeral of a murdered general in the Saint Nedelya Church terror assault. Following a further attempt on Boris's life the same year, military reprisals killed several thousand communists and agrarians, including representatives of the intelligentsia. Finally, in October 1925, there was a short border war with Greece, known as the Petrich Incident, which was resolved with the help of the League of Nations.

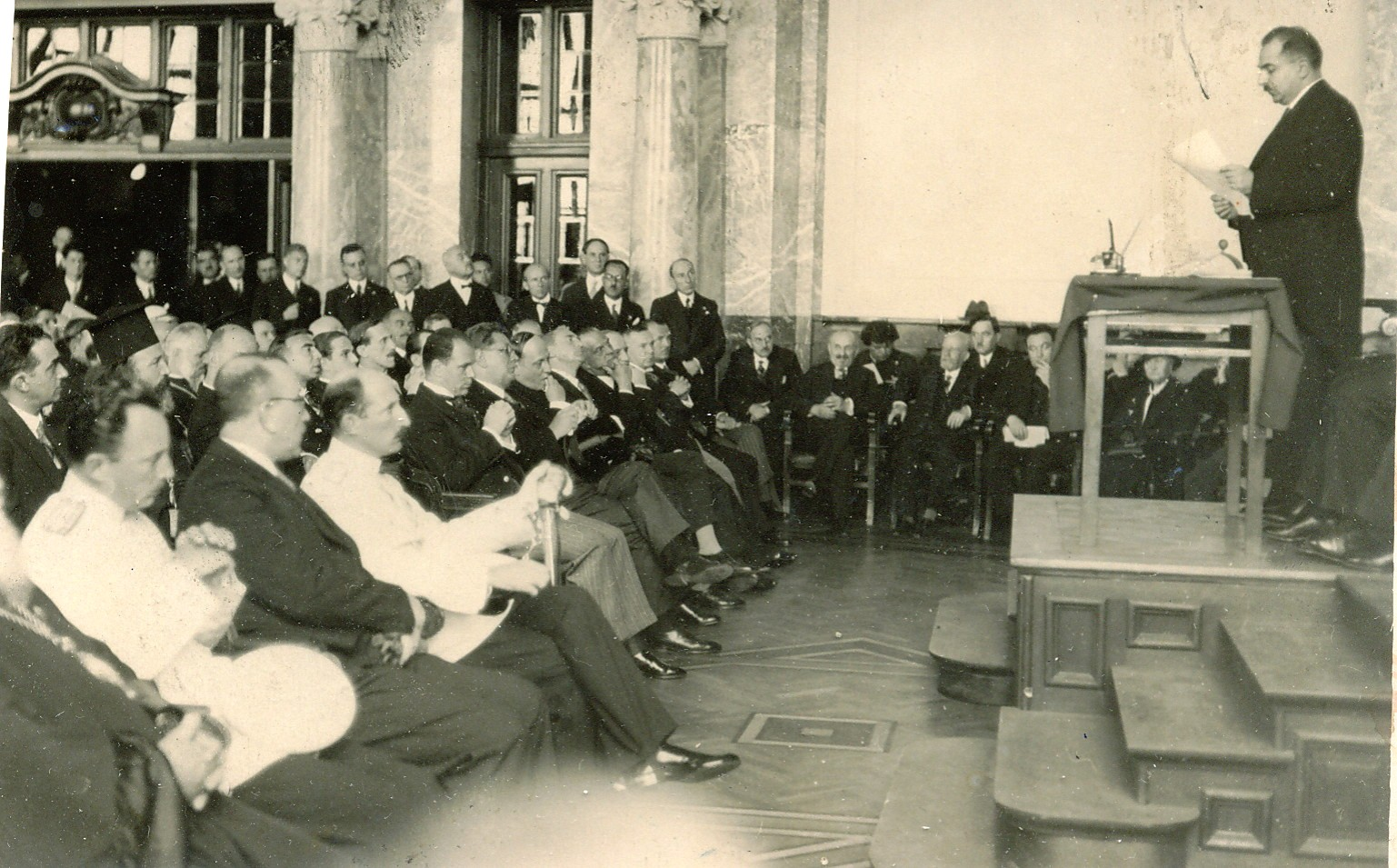
Boris III of Bulgaria and Prime-minister Kimon Georgiev during the opening session of the IV International Congress of Byzantine Studies (Sofia, 9 September 1934)

In the coup on 19 May 1934, the Zveno military organisation established a dictatorship, abolished political parties, and reduced Boris to a puppet figurehead. The following year, he staged a counter-coup and retook control of the country. The political process was controlled by the Tsar, but a semi-parliamentary system was re-introduced without restoration of political parties.

With the rise of the "King's government" in 1935, Bulgaria entered an era of prosperity and astounding growth, which deservedly qualifies it as the Golden Age of the Third Bulgarian Kingdom. It lasted nearly five years. According to Reuben H. Markham, former Balkan correspondent for The Christian Science Monitor, writing in 1941, "As a ruler, Boris is competent; as a citizen exemplary; as a personality inspiring.... His country is to a large extent indebted to him for the comparatively favorable situation it has held in the Balkans, during the last two decades." Markham added, "King Boris is very accessible. He constantly comes into contact with persons of every sort. He drives his car up and down the country with no special guards and often stops to converse with peasants, workers or children. He gives lifts to the humblest pedestrians. Rare is the Bulgarian township that does not boast of at least one person who has ridden with the King." "He is without question one of the best kings in Europe."

Boris visited the United Kingdom in 1927 and 1932, staying with his childhood friend Nadejda Stancioff at her home in Blair Drummond, Doune, Stirling, Scotland. During another visit to the United Kingdom in 1937, Boris made international news for taking the throttle of a London Midland Scotland Railway Coronation Class steam locomotive.

== Marriage and issue ==
Boris married Giovanna of Savoy, daughter of Victor Emmanuel III of Italy, and as he remained Orthodox, it was a Catholic nuptial ceremony outside of Mass. It was held at the Basilica of Saint Francis of Assisi in Assisi, Italy, on 25 October 1930. Benito Mussolini registered the marriage at the town hall immediately after the liturgy.

Their marriage produced two children: a daughter, Maria Louisa, on 13 January 1933, later head of the House of Saxe-Coburg and Gotha-Koháry, and a son and heir to the throne, Simeon, on 16 June 1937, who was the last Tsar of Bulgaria as Simeon II (1943–1946).

== Second World War ==
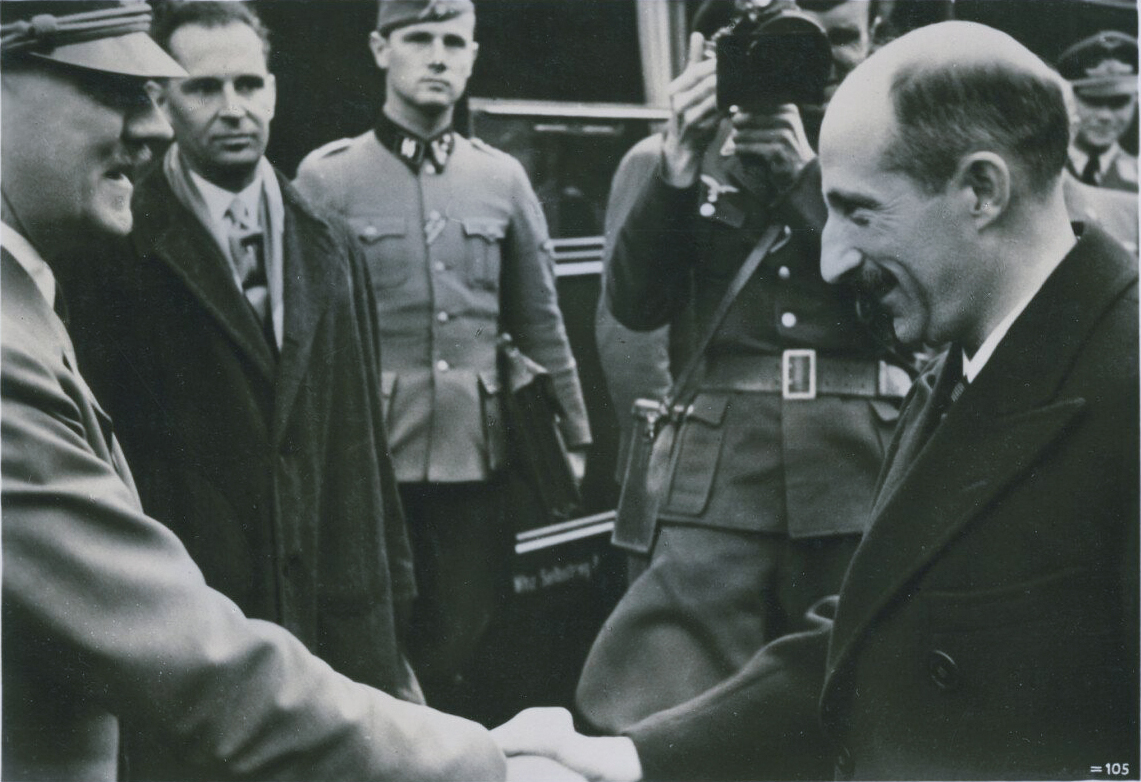
Adolf Hitler receives King Boris III of Bulgaria at his headquarters, 25 April 1941.

In the early days of the Second World War, Bulgaria was neutral, but powerful groups in the country swayed its politics towards Germany (with which Bulgaria had been allied in the First World War). As a result of peace treaties that ended the First World War (the Treaty of Versailles and the Treaty of Neuilly), Bulgaria, which had fought on the losing side, lost two important territories to neighboring countries: the Southern plain of Dobruja to Romania, and Western Thrace to Greece. The Bulgarians considered these treaties an insult and wanted the lands restored. When Adolf Hitler rose to power, he tried to win Bulgarian Tsar Boris III's allegiance. In the summer of 1940, after a year of war, Hitler hosted diplomatic talks between Bulgaria and Romania in Vienna. On 7 September, an agreement was signed for the return of Southern Dobruja to Bulgaria. The Bulgarian nation rejoiced. In March 1941, Boris allied himself with the Axis powers, thus recovering most of Macedonia and Aegean Thrace, as well as protecting his country from being crushed by the German Wehrmacht like neighboring Yugoslavia and Greece. For recovering these territories, Tsar Boris was called the Unifier (Bulgarian: Цар Обединител). Tsar Boris appeared on the cover of Time on 20 January 1941 wearing a full military uniform.

Despite this alliance, and the German presence in Sofia and along the railway line which passed through the Bulgarian capital to Greece, Boris was not willing to provide full and unconditional cooperation with Germany. He refused to send regular Bulgarian troops to fight the Soviet Union on the Eastern Front alongside Germany and the other Axis belligerents, and also refused to allow unofficial volunteers (such as Spain's Blue Division) to participate, although the German legation in Sofia received 1,500 requests from young Bulgarian men who wanted to fight against Bolshevism.

But there was a price to be paid for the return of Dobrudja. This was the adoption of the anti-Jewish "Law for Protection of the Nation" (Закон за защита на нацията – ЗЗН) on 24 December 1940. This law was in accordance with the Nuremberg Laws in Nazi Germany and the rest of Hitler's occupied Europe. Bulgarian Prime Minister Bogdan Filov and Interior Minister Petur Gabrovski, both Nazi sympathisers, were the architects of this law, which restricted Jewish rights, imposed new taxes, and established a quota for Jews in some professions. Many Bulgarians protested in letters to their government.

=== The Holocaust ===
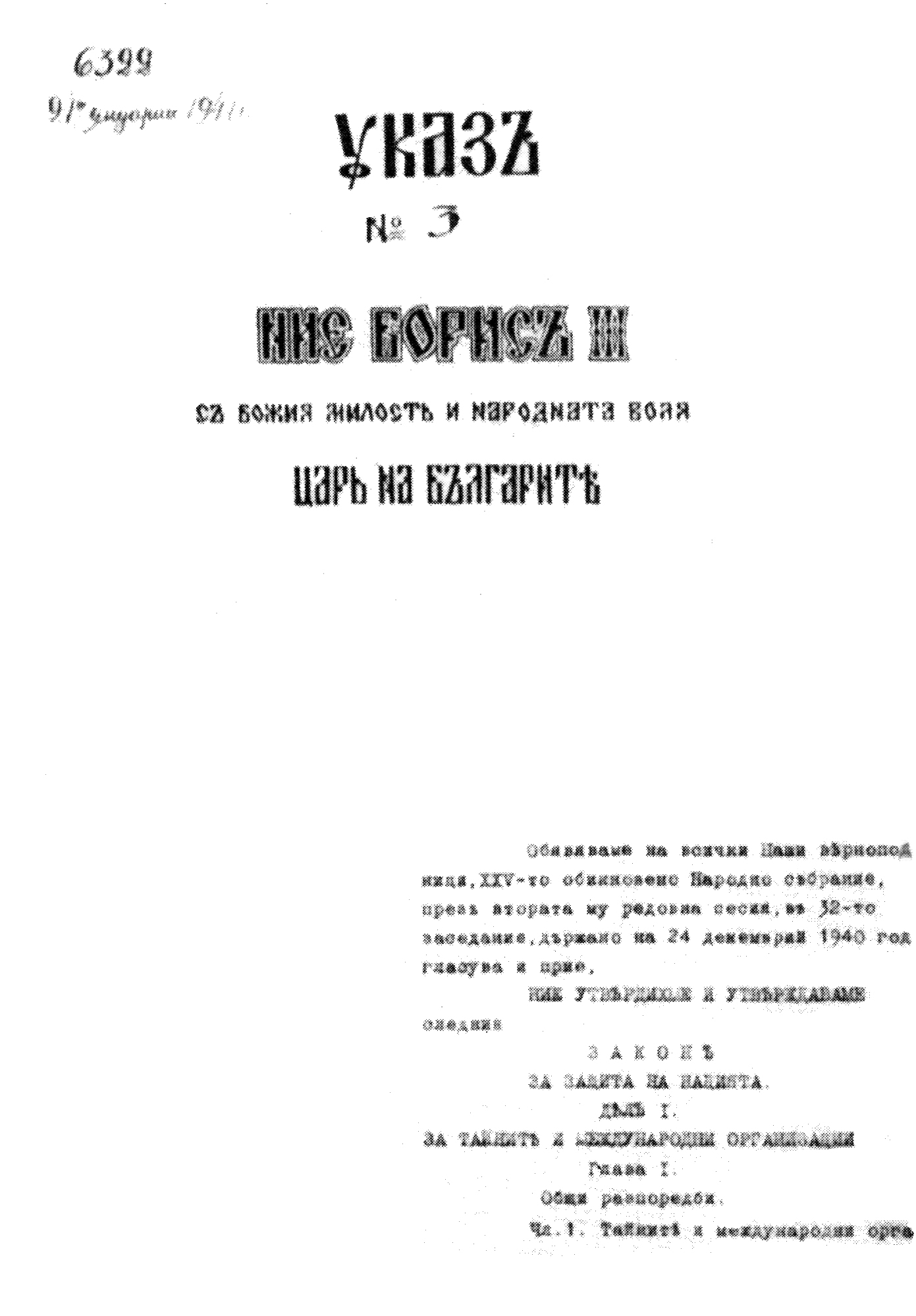
Decree of Boris III for approval of the antisemitic Law for Protection of the Nation

In early 1943, Hitler's emissary, Theodor Dannecker, arrived in Bulgaria. Dannecker was an SS-Hauptsturmführer (captain) and one of Adolf Eichmann's associates who guided the campaign for the deportation of the French Jews to concentration camps. In February 1943, Dannecker met with the Commissar for Jewish Affairs in Bulgaria, Aleksandar Belev, notorious for his antisemitic and strong nationalist views. They held closed-door meetings and ended with a secret agreement signed on 22 February 1943 for the deportations of 20,000 Jews – 11,343 from Aegean Thrace and Vardar Macedonia, and 8,000 from Bulgaria proper. These were the territories conquered by Germany, but being under Bulgarian occupation and jurisdiction at the time, although this occupation was never recognized internationally. The Jewish people in these territories were the only ones who were not awarded Bulgarian citizenship in 1941–1942, unlike the rest of the population. The remaining 20,000 Bulgarian Jews were to be deported later.

The initial roundups began on 9 March 1943, during that month, Bulgarian military and police authorities deported 11,343 Jews from the Bulgarian-occupied regions of Vardar Macedonia, Pomoravlje in occupied Yugoslavia and Aegean Thrace to Auschwitz-Birkenau and Treblinka.

Boxcars were lined up in Kyustendil, a town near the western border. But as the news about the imminent deportations leaked out, protests arose throughout Bulgaria. On the morning of 9 March, a delegation from Kyustendil, composed of eminent public figures and headed by Dimitar Peshev, the deputy speaker of the National Assembly, met with Interior Minister Petur Gabrovski. Facing strong opposition from within the country, Gabrovski relented. The same day, he sent telegrams to the roundup centers in the pre-war territory of Bulgaria, postponing the deportations to a future, unidentified date. In a report of 5 April 1943, Adolph Hoffman, a German government adviser and police attache at the German legation in Sofia from 1943 to 1944 wrote: "The Minister of Interior has received instruction from the highest place to stop the planned deportation of Jews from the old borders of Bulgaria". In fact, Gabrovski's decision was not taken on his own personal initiative, but had come from the highest authority – Tsar Boris III, who decided under pressure to temporarily stop the deportation of the rest of the Jews. While Jews living in Bulgaria proper were saved, almost all the Jews from Vardar Macedonia and Aegean Thrace perished in the death camps of Treblinka and Majdanek. A telegram dated 4 April 1943 from Germany's foreign minister, Joachim von Ribbentrop, indicated the readiness of King Boris to hand over half of the Jewish population:

The King has declared that up to now he has only given his consent for deportation of Jews from Macedonia and Thrace to areas in Eastern Europe. He only wants to deport a limited number of Bolsheviks-Communists from Bulgaria itself. The other 25,000 Jews will be concentrated in camps within the country.

Still reluctant to comply with the German deportation request, the royal palace used Swiss diplomatic channels to inquire whether it was possible to deport the Jews to British-controlled Palestine by ship rather than to concentration camps in German-occupied Poland by boat and train. This was blocked by the British Foreign Secretary, Anthony Eden.

Aware of Bulgaria's unreliability on the Jewish matter, the Nazis grew more suspicious about the activities of an old friend of Tsar Boris, Monsignor Angelo Roncalli (the future Pope John XXIII), the Papal Nuncio in Istanbul, who was attempting to help European Jews threatened by the Nazis and their allies. Reporting on the humanitarian efforts of Roncalli, his secretary in Venice and in the Vatican, Monsignor Loris F. Capovilla wrote: "Through his intervention, and with the help of Tsar Boris III of Bulgaria, thousands of Jews from Slovakia, who had first been sent to Hungary and then to Bulgaria, and who were in danger of being sent to Nazi concentration camps, obtained transit visas for Palestine signed by him."

However, regarding his actions during the Holocaust, "like Prime Minister Filov, Boris III seems to have been motivated mainly by considerations of Realpolitik", and "appears to have played a less heroic role than his admirers ascribe to him ... What motivated him was national interest as he understood it, not humanitarian concerns."

=== Meetings with Hitler ===
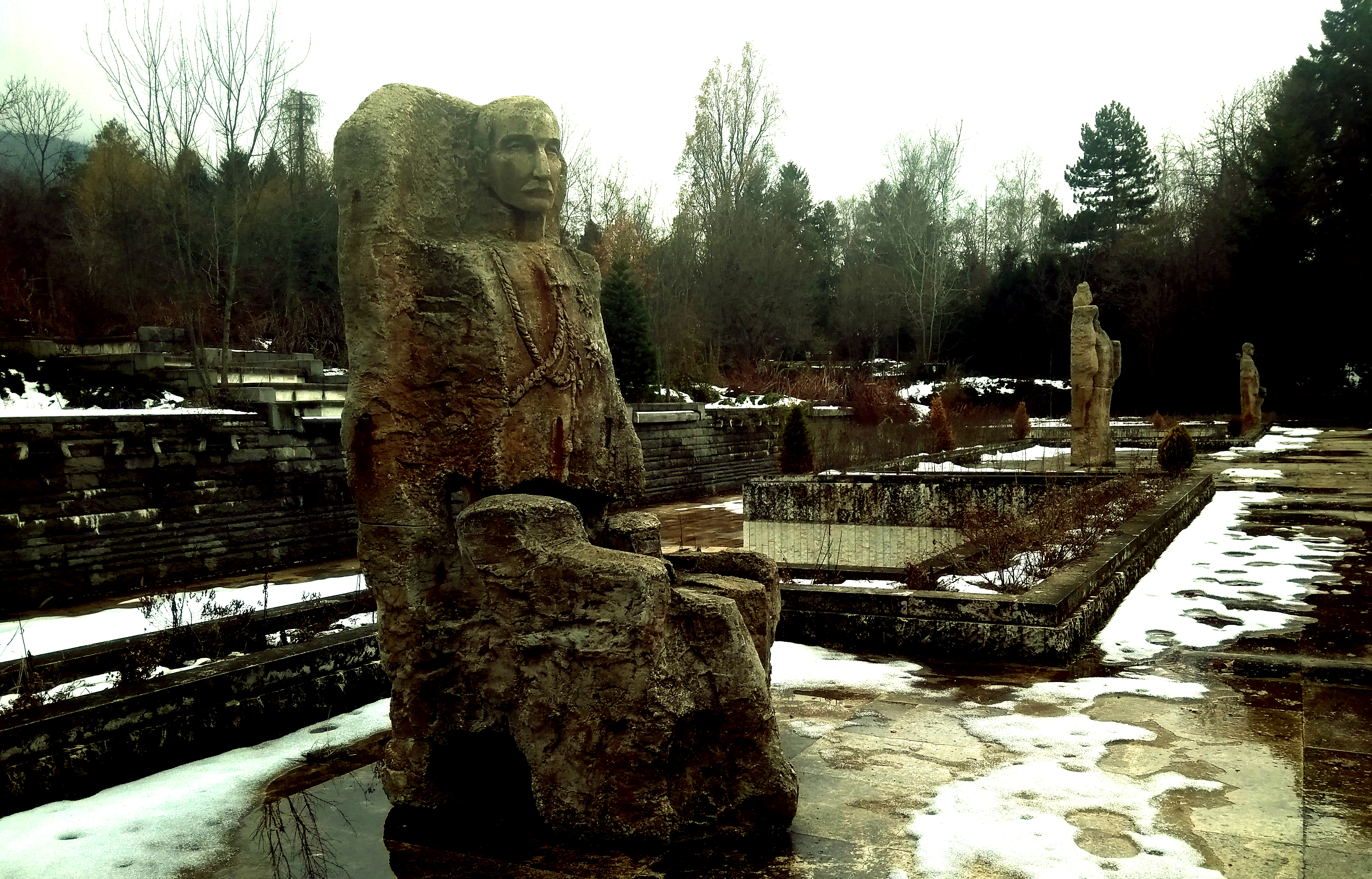
Boris III Tsar of Bulgaria, sculptor Kunyo Novachev, architect Milomir Boganov. It is the first statue of the Tsar. Since 2016 it has been displayed in the central open area of the National Historical Museum of Bulgaria in Sofia

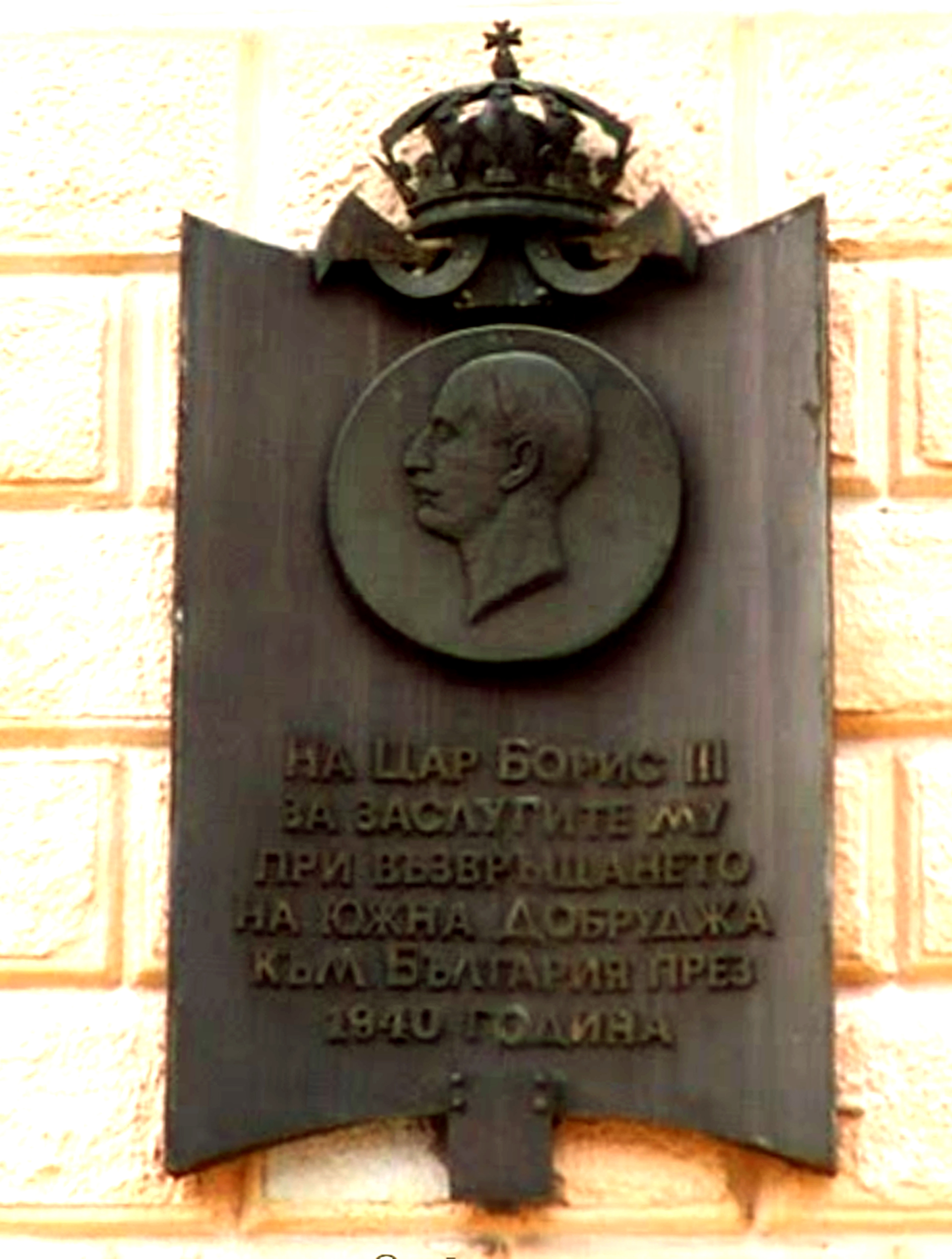
Dobrich downtown – square "Tsar Boris III Unifier". Memorial metalwork "Tsar Boris III Unifier" on the City hall from 1992 in memory of thanks for the liberation of Southern Dobrudzha in 1940 and its return to Bulgaria.

Nazi pressure on Tsar Boris III continued for the deportation of the Bulgarian Jewry. At the end of March, Hitler invited the Tsar to visit him. Upon returning home, Boris ordered able-bodied Jewish men to join hard labor units to build roads within the interior of his kingdom. Some claim that this was the Tsar's attempt to avoid deporting them.

During May 1943, Dannecker and Belev, the Commissar for Jewish Affairs, planned the deportation of more than 48,000 Bulgarian Jews, who were to be loaded on steamers on the River Danube. Boris continued the cat-and-mouse game that he had long been playing; he insisted to the Nazis that Bulgarian Jews were needed for the construction of roads and railway lines inside his kingdom. Nazi officials requested that Bulgaria deport its Jewish population to German-occupied Poland. The request caused a public outcry, and a campaign whose most prominent leaders were Parliament's deputy speaker Dimitar Peshev and the head of the Bulgarian Orthodox Church, Archbishop Stefan, was organised. Following this campaign, Boris refused to permit the extradition of Bulgaria's nearly 50,000 Jews.

On 30 June 1943, Apostolic Delegate Angelo Roncalli wrote to Boris, asking for mercy for "the sons of the Jewish people." He wrote that Tsar Boris should on no account agree to the dishonorable action that Hitler was demanding. "On the copy of this letter, Roncalli wrote, by hand and in Italian ... "The king has acted ('Il Re ha fatto qualche cosa') ... but he also has his own difficulties, which he asks us to understand. To deal with individual cases arouses the jealousy of others. But I repeat, he has acted ('Però, ripeto, ha fatto')."

An excerpt from the diary of Rabbi Daniel Zion, the spiritual leader of the Jewish community in Bulgaria during the war years, reads:

Do not be afraid, dear brothers and sisters! Trust in the Holy Rock of our salvation ... Yesterday I was informed by Bishop Stephen about his conversation with the Bulgarian king. When I went to see Bishop Stephen, he said: "Tell your people, the King has promised, that the Bulgarian Jews shall not leave the borders of Bulgaria." When I returned to the synagogue, silence reigned in anticipation of the outcome of my meeting with Bishop Stephen. When I entered, my words were: "Yes, my brethren, God heard our prayers."Bjoraker, Bill (2015), Snodderly, Beth (ed.), Agents of International Development and Shalom, Pasadena: William Carey International University Press, p. 79

Most irritating for Hitler was the Tsar's refusal to declare war on the Soviet Union or send Bulgarian troops to the Eastern Front. On 9 August 1943, Hitler summoned Boris to a stormy meeting at Rastenburg, East Prussia. Boris arrived by plane from Vrazhdebna on 14 August. The Tsar again asserted his unwillingness to send Bulgarian Jews to death camps in occupied Poland or Germany. While Bulgaria had declared a "symbolic" war on the distant United Kingdom and United States, the Tsar was not willing to do more than that. At the meeting, Boris once again refused to get involved in the war against the Soviet Union, giving two major reasons for his unwillingness to send troops to Russia. First, many ordinary Bulgarians had strong pro-Russian sentiments; and second, the political and military position of Turkey remained unclear. The "symbolic" war against the Western Allies turned into a disaster for the citizens of Sofia, as the city was heavily bombarded by the US Army Air Force and the British Royal Air Force in 1943 and 1944. (The bombardment of Bulgarian cities was started by the British Royal Air Force in April 1941 without declaring a war.)

Bulgaria's opposition came to a head at this last official meeting between Hitler and Boris. Reports of the meeting indicate that Hitler was furious with the Tsar for refusing either to join the war against the USSR or to deport the Jews within his kingdom. At the end of the meeting, it was agreed that "the Bulgarian Jews were not to be deported, for Tsar Boris had insisted that the Jews were needed for various laboring tasks including road maintenance."

== Death ==
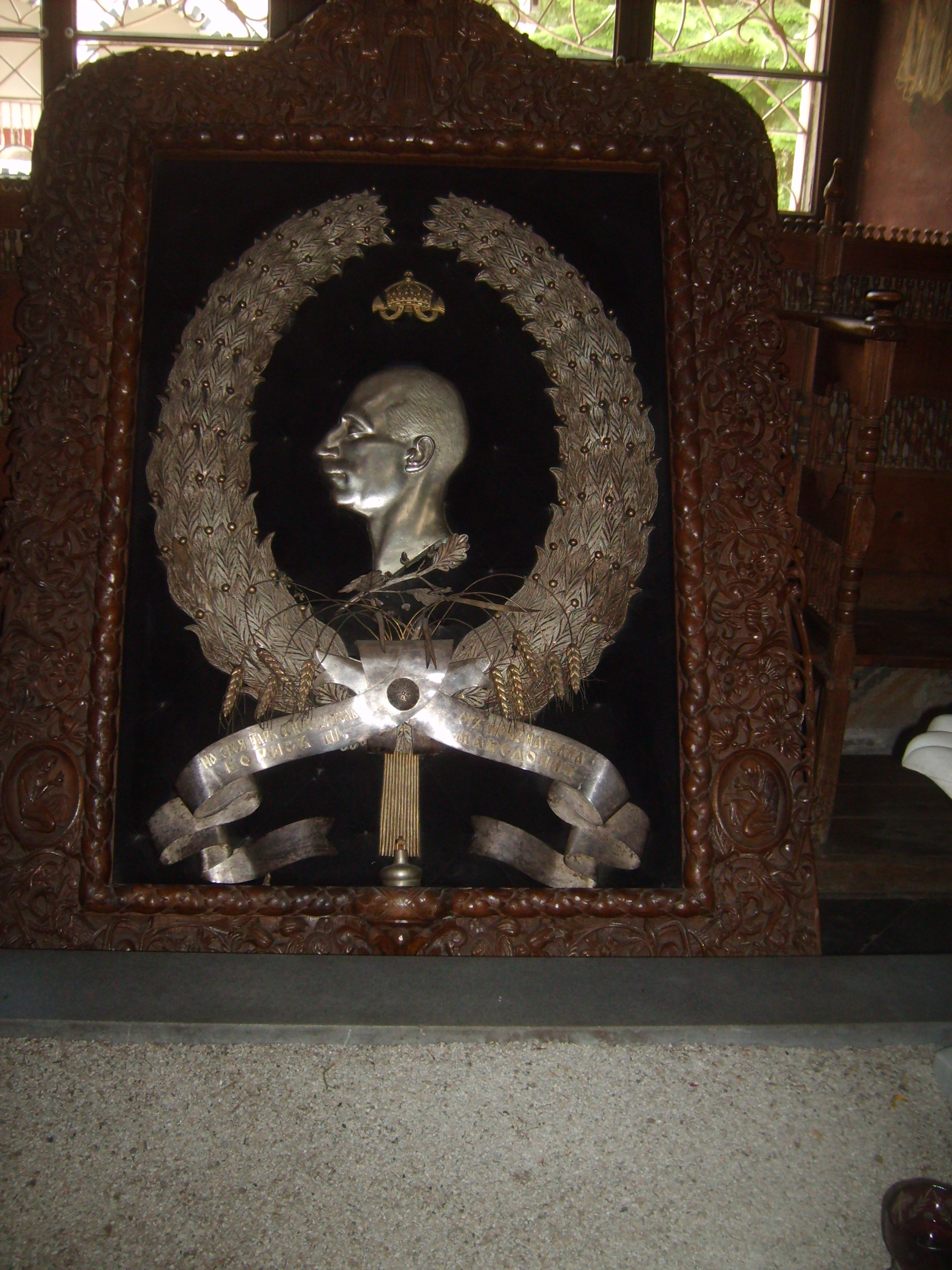
Wood carving made by inhabitants of the village of Osoi, Debar district, with the inscription: To its Tsar Liberator Boris III, from grateful Macedonia.

Shortly after returning to Sofia from a meeting with Hitler, Boris died of apparent heart failure on 28 August 1943, at approximately 16:22. Due to its timing and suddenness, as "soon as the news of the king's illness and death appeared abroad, rumours of assassination spread throughout the world." The American newspapers even stated that Hitler had gotten into an argument with the Tsar and attacked him, with the latter suffering a heart attack as a result, with The New York Times going so far as to publish the "bizarre story of a police inspector shooting Boris in the Sofia railway station."

One theory is that Boris was poisoned on the orders of Hitler, who was greatly irritated after his last meeting with the Bulgarian ruler because of his refusal to hand over the Bulgarian Jews and to send troops against the USSR. However, according to the Bulgarian Prime Minister, Bogdan Filov, "the discussion between Hitler and Boris involved the use of Bulgarian troops only in the Balkans, not in the Soviet Union". Hitler "had asked Bulgaria to supply two divisions to fight in northern Greece and eventually in Albania", but "Boris promised only one." Not only is it "doubtful that an argument over the use of one division in the Balkans would have provided Hitler with sufficient motive to have Boris assassinated", there is also "no evidence that Hitler planned this alleged assassination. In fact, all things point to the contrary: that he was surprised by the king's death."

His son, Simeon Saxe-Coburg-Gotha, did not reject the theory of a German assassination outright, but pointed out as probable the hypothesis that the USSR was also interested in the Tsar's death, in which case he argued that the NKVD may have been responsible. Princess Marie Louise of Bulgaria stated in an interview that there was no definitive version of what had happened, but that she was convinced that her father had not been poisoned by the Nazis or the British, but by the Russians.

In his personal diary, Joseph Goebbels expressed his belief that the Italian government, in the person of Prime Minister Pietro Badoglio, was responsible for Boris III's death. On 10 September 1943, Goebbels wrote:

The Fuehrer told me that it must now be regarded as certain that King Boris was poisoned. The German doctors have reached the conclusion that he was killed by snake poison. It is not yet known who mixed the poison. The German doctors wanted to perform an autopsy; the Bulgarian government agreed, but the royal family refused. I would not regard it as impossible that the poisoning was engineered by the Italians. After their latest act of treachery, I am ready to credit the Badoglio regime and the Italians generally with anything.

Three German doctors had been sent "to help the Bulgarian physicians" after Boris fell ill. According to the diary of the German attaché in Sofia at the time, Carl-August von Schoenebeck, two of the three German doctors who attended the King – Sajitz and Hans Eppinger – both believed that "poisoning was a possibility ... although they were reluctant to give a scientific opinion without an autopsy." According to Schoenebeck, they speculated that he had died from the same poison that Eppinger had allegedly found two years earlier in the postmortem examination of the Greek Prime Minister Ioannis Metaxas. They claimed that this slow poison takes weeks to do its work, and causes the appearance of blotches on the skin of its victim before death. However, "no solid evidence has ever emerged to definitively prove that Metaxas was murdered. The official medical records are consistent with his death being caused by a severe throat infection, and no forensic investigation or autopsy at the time pointed to foul play."

Hitler was convinced that the Italian royal court arranged for the poisoning of Boris III, as he believed that Princess Mafalda of Savoy, sister of Joan of Bulgaria, had visited Bulgaria four weeks before the monarch's death, and that her stay had coincided with the events of 25 July 1943, when Italian Fascist dictator Benito Mussolini was removed from power by King Victor Emmanuel III. However, Princess Mafalda "arrived in Bulgaria only after King Boris's death, to attend the funeral", as contemporary newspaper reports and photographs attest, and "Hitler's allegation that she came to Bulgaria before the king's illness is absolutely false and has never been taken seriously."

Ultimately, there is "no firm proof" that Boris's death was "due to foul play", and the "story of an unidentified poison which induces a heart attack a week after its administration leaves one somewhat skeptical. Furthermore, the questions of both motive and culprit cannot be answered with satisfactory" evidence. However, according to author Robert Bideleux, many Bulgarians "have no doubt wanted to believe that Boris was poisoned, because that would put both their former tsar and their country in a better light, by suggesting that they were really 'victims' of (rather than 'collaborators' with) Nazism."

Following Boris's death, his six-year-old son, Simeon II, succeeded to the throne. A regency council headed by Prince Kiril was appointed to exercise royal authority until the young tsar reached his majority.

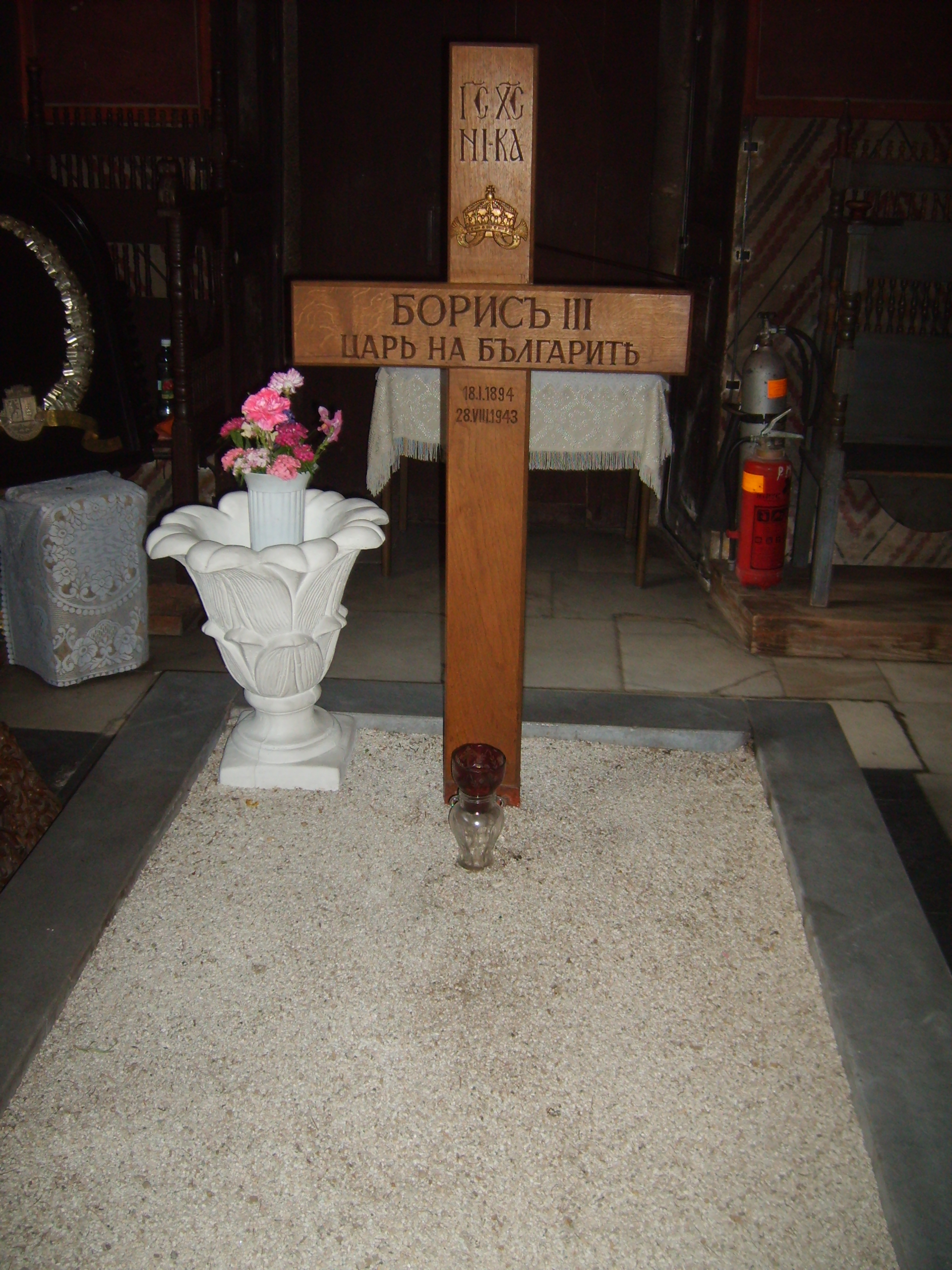
The grave of Tsar Boris III in the Rila Monastery

Following a large, impressive state funeral at the Alexander Nevsky Cathedral, Sofia, where the streets were lined with weeping crowds, the coffin of Tsar Boris III was taken by train to the mountains and buried in Bulgaria's largest and most important monastery, the Rila Monastery. After taking power in September 1944, the Communist-dominated government had his body exhumed and secretly buried in the courtyard of Vrana Palace, near Sofia. At a later time, the Communist authorities moved the zinc coffin from Vrana to a secret location, which remains unknown to this day. After the fall of communism, an excavation was made at Vrana Palace. Only Boris's heart was found, as it had been put in a glass cylinder outside the coffin. The heart was taken by his widow in 1994 to Rila Monastery, where it was reinterred.

A wood carving is placed on the left side of his grave in Rila Monastery, made on 10 October 1943 by inhabitants of the village of Osoj, Debar district. The carving bears the following inscription in Bulgarian:

На своя Царъ Освободителъ Борисъ III отъ признателна Македония (lit. To its Tsar Liberator Boris III, from grateful Macedonia.)

== Honours ==
=== National ===
- Bulgaria: Sovereign Knight Grand Cross with Collar of the Order of Saints Cyril and Methodius
- Bulgaria: Sovereign Knight Grand Cross with Collar of the Order of Saint Alexander
- Bulgaria: Sovereign Knight Grand Cross of the Order of Bravery
- Bulgaria: Sovereign Knight Grand Cross of the Order of Military Merit
- Bulgaria: Sovereign Knight Grand Cross of the Order of Civil Merit
- Bulgaria: Sovereign recipient of the Medal for the Independence of Bulgaria
- Bulgaria: Sovereign recipient of the Medal for Participation in the Balkan Wars of 1912–1913
- Bulgaria: Sovereign recipient of the Medal for Participation in the European War 1915–1918
- Bulgaria: Sovereign recipient of the Commemorative Medal of the death of Princess Marie Louise
- Bulgaria: Sovereign recipient of the 1000th Anniversary Medal of the birth of Tsar Boris I
- Bulgaria: Sovereign recipient of the Medal for the Coronation of Tsar Ferdinand I and Queen Eleonore
- Bulgaria: Sovereign recipient of the 50th Anniversary Medal of Liberation from the Ottoman Empire
- Bulgaria: Sovereign recipient of the 1000th Anniversary Medal of the death of Tsar Simeon I
- Bulgaria: Sovereign recipient of the Medal for the Wedding of Tsar Boris III And Princess Giovanna of Italy

=== Foreign ===
- Belgium Knight Grand Cordon of the Order of Leopold
- France: Grand Cross of the Legion of Honour
- Croatia Grand Cross with Danica star and sash Order of the Crown of King Zvonimir 1942.
- Germany:
  - Nazi Germany: Order of the German Eagle (Grand Cross class in gold with star)
  - German Imperial and Royal Family:
    - Knight of the Imperial and Royal Order of the Black Eagle
    - Knight Grand Cross of the Imperial and Royal Order of the Red Eagle
    - Pour le Mérite (military), 26 October 1916
  - Bavarian Royal Family: Knight with Collar of the Royal Order of St. Hubert
  - Ernestine Ducal Families: Knight Grand Cross of the Saxe-Ernestine House Order, 1908
- Hungary:
  - Hungarian Royal Family: Knight Grand Cross of the Royal Hungarian Order of St. Stephen, 1912
  - Regency Hungary: Knight Grand Cross with Holy Crown and Collar of the Order of Merit, 22 June 1939
- Italy:
  - Italian Royal Family: Knight with Collar of the Supreme Order of the Most Holy Annunciation, 2 February 1911
  - Parmese Ducal Family: Knight Grand Cross of the Sacred Military Constantinian Order of St. George
- Montenegrin Royal Family: Knight Grand Cross of the Order of Prince Danilo I, 1910
- Poland:
  - Knight of the Order of the White Eagle
- Romania:
  - Romanian Royal Family: Knight Grand Cross with Collar of the Order of Carol I
- Russia:
  - Knight with Collar of the Imperial Order of St. Andrew, 1907
  - Knight 1st Class of the Order of St. Anna
- Georgian Royal Family: Knight Grand Cross of the Royal Order of the Eagle of Georgia
- United Kingdom: Honorary Knight Grand Cross of the Royal Victorian Order
- Kingdom of Yugoslavia:
  - Yugoslavian Royal Family: Knight Grand Cross of the Order of the Star of Karađorđe

=== Arms ===
Arms of Boris as Prince of Tarnovo (1894–1918)	Arms of Boris III as Sovereign of Bulgaria (1929–1943)

== Patronages ==
=== National patronages ===
- Bulgaria: Sovereign Patron of the 1st Infantry regiment of Prince Alexander I
- Bulgaria: Sovereign Patron of the 4th Infantry regiment of Prince Boris
- Bulgaria: Sovereign Patron of the 6th Infantry regiment of Tsar Ferdinand I
- Bulgaria: Sovereign Patron of the 8th Infantry regiment of Princess Marie Louise
- Bulgaria: Sovereign Patron of the 9th Infantry regiment of Princess Clementine
- Bulgaria: Sovereign Patron of the 18th Infantry regiment of Tsar Ferdinand I
- Bulgaria: Sovereign Patron of the 20th Infantry regiment of Prince Krill and of Princesses Eudoxia and Nadezhda
- Bulgaria: Sovereign Patron of the 24th Infantry regiment of Queen Eleonore
- Bulgaria: Sovereign Patron of the 19th Infantry regiment of Prince Simeon
- Bulgaria: Sovereign Patron of the 1st Cavalry regiment of Tsar Alexander I
- Bulgaria: Sovereign Patron of the 2nd Cavalry regiment of Princess Marie Louise
- Bulgaria: Sovereign Patron of the 10th Cavalry regiment of Queen Ionna
- Bulgaria: Sovereign Patron of the 3rd Cavalry regiment of Prince Simeon
- Bulgaria: Sovereign Patron of the 4th Artillery regiment of KTsar Ferdinand I
- Bulgaria: Sovereign Patron of the Life Guard regiment of The Tsar
- Bulgaria: Sovereign Patron of the Navy regiment of The Tsar
- Bulgaria: Sovereign Patron of the 1st Army Artillery regiment of Prince Simeon

=== Foreign patronages ===
- German Empire: Patron of the Balkan Infantry regiment of Emperor Wilhelm II
  - Saxe-Coburg and Gotha: Patron of the 22nd Infantry regiment of Charles Edward I
- Russian Empire: Patron of the 17th Infantry regiment of Grand Duke Vladmir Alexandrovich
- Russian Empire: Patron of the Azov Infantry regiment

== Tributes ==
The Los Angeles Times reported in 1994 that the Jewish National Fund's Medal of the Legion of Honor was being awarded posthumously to Tsar Boris III, "the first non-Jew to receive one of the Jewish community's highest honors".

In 1996, Bulgarian Jews in the United States and the Jewish National Fund erected a monument in "The Bulgarian Forest" in Israel to honor Tsar Boris as a savior of Bulgarian Jews. In July 2003, a public committee headed by Israeli Chief Justice Moshe Bejski decided to remove the memorial because Bulgaria had consented to the delivery of 11,343 Jews from occupied territory of Macedonia, Thrace and Pirot to the Germans.

Borisova gradina, the largest park in Sofia and one of the city's biggest boulevards are named after him.

== Ancestors ==
Ancestors of Boris III of Bulgaria

8. Prince Ferdinand of Saxe-Coburg and Gotha
4. Prince August of Saxe-Coburg and Gotha
9. Princess Maria Antonia Koháry of Csábrág and Szitnya
2. Ferdinand I of Bulgaria
10. Louis Philippe I of France
5. Princess Clémentine of Orléans
11. Princess Maria Amalia of Naples and Sicily
1. Boris III of Bulgaria
12. Charles III, Duke of Parma
6. Robert I, Duke of Parma
13. Princess Louise of Artois
3. Princess Marie Louise of Bourbon-Parma
14. Ferdinand II of the Two Sicilies
7. Princess Maria Pia of Bourbon-Two Sicilies
15. Archduchess Maria Theresa of Austria

== See also ==
- History of Bulgaria
- European interwar dictatorships
- List of covers of Time magazine (1940s)

== Bibliography ==
- Bulgaria in the Second World War by Marshall Lee Miller, Stanford University Press, 1975
- Boris III of Bulgaria 1894–1943, by Pashanko Dimitroff, The Book Guild, London, 1986, ISBN 0-86332-140-2
- Groueff, Stephane (1997). Crown of Thorns. Lanham, Maryland: Madison Books. ISBN 978-1-56833-114-0.
- The Betrayal of Bulgaria by Gregory Lauder-Frost, Monarchist League Policy Paper, London, 1989
- Balkans into Southeastern Europe by John R. Lampe, Palgrave Macmillan, New York, 2006
- A History of Israel: From the Rise of Zionism to Our Time by Howard M. Sachar, A. A. Knopf, New York, 2007, ISBN 978-0-394-48564-5
- Chary, Frederick B. (1972). The Bulgarian Jews and the Final Solution, 1940-1944. University of Pittsburgh Press. ISBN 0-8229-8443-1.

Boris III of Bulgaria House of Saxe-Coburg and Gotha Cadet branch of the House of Wettin Born: 30 January 1894 Died: 28 August 1943
Regnal titles
Preceded by Ferdinand I	Tsar of Bulgaria; 3 October 1918 – 28 August 1943	Succeeded by Simeon II
