= Eleonore Reuss of Köstritz =

Princess/Tsaritsa of Bulgaria from 1908 to 1917

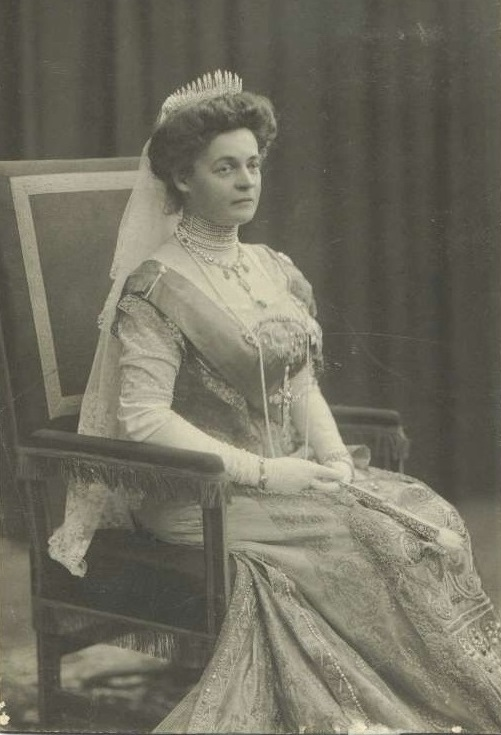

Princess consort of Bulgaria
- Tenure: 28 February 1908 – 22 September 1908

Tsaritsa consort of Bulgaria
- Tenure: 22 September 1908 – 12 September 1917
- Born: 22 August 1860; Trebschen, Kingdom of Prussia
- Died: 12 September 1917 (aged 57); Euxinograd, Kingdom of Bulgaria
- Burial: Boyana Church
- Spouse: Ferdinand I of Bulgaria (m. 1908)
Names
- Eleonore Caroline Gasparine Louise Reuss
- House: Reuss-Köstritz
- Father: Prince Heinrich IV Reuss of Köstritz
- Mother: Princess Luise Caroline Reuss of Greiz
- Religion: Eastern Orthodox prev. Lutheranism

Eleonore Caroline Gasparine Louise Reuss-Köstritz (Bulgarian: Елеонора Българска; 22 August 1860 – 12 September 1917) was Tsaritsa (Queen) of Bulgaria, as the second wife of Ferdinand I of Bulgaria and member of the ancient House of Reuss by birth.

== Life ==
Royal Monogram of Queen Eleonore of Bulgaria.

Born in Trebschen Castle in the Prussian Province of Brandenburg (present-day Poland), the daughter of Prince Heinrich IV Reuss zu Köstritz (1821–1894) and his wife, Princess Luise Caroline Reuss zu Greiz (1822–1875), widowed Princess of Saxe-Altenburg. She was also the younger sister of Prince Heinrich XXIV Reuss of Köstritz and a first cousin of Grand Duchess Maria Pavlovna of Russia. Eleonore's father Heinrich IV and Marie's mother Auguste were brother and sister. She was described as "a plain but practical... capable and kind-hearted woman."

At the age of 17, Eleonore was engaged to Russian nobleman, Mark Alexandrovich Ospenyi. The day after the engagement he was summoned to Russia to fight in the Russo-Turkish War. Ospeni was wounded during a battle at the village of Telish and later died from these wounds.

Following the death of his first wife, Marie Louise of Bourbon-Parma, Tsar Ferdinand sought another wife to carry out the official duties required of the consort of a head of state. As a man who was no longer required to produce heirs, Ferdinand stipulated to his assistant that he wanted a bride who did not expect affection or attention.

A list of candidates was whittled down to Eleonore and she and Ferdinand subsequently married at a Catholic ceremony on 28 February 1908 at St. Augustine's Church in Coburg and a Protestant ceremony on 1 March 1908 at Osterstein Castle, Reuss family estate.

Initially titled Princess of Bulgaria, Eleonore assumed the title Tsaritsa ("Queen") on 5 October 1908 following Bulgaria's declaration of independence from the Ottoman Empire.

Eleonore remained neglected by Ferdinand throughout their marriage, leaving her to raise her stepchildren and devote herself to the welfare of the Bulgarian people. Eleonore came into her own during the Balkan Wars and First World War when, working tirelessly as a nurse, she was a cause of great comfort for many injured and dying Bulgarian soldiers. It was said that she had "a special gift for relieving suffering".

Tsaritsa Eleonore became seriously ill during the final years of World War I, dying in Euxinograd, Bulgaria, on 12 September 1917. Her last wish was to be buried in the cemetery of a 12th-century church at Boyana, near Sofia. During the Socialist period, however, the grave was broken into, her jewelry stolen and then the memorial stone bulldozed back in the grave, with no visible marks left over the ground. However, after the democratic changes in 1989, the original memorial stone was excavated and the site was restored back to the original state.

== Arms ==
Coat of Arms of Queen Eleonore of Bulgaria

== Ancestry ==
Ancestors of Eleonore Reuss of Köstritz

8. Heinrich XLIV, Prince Reuss of Köstritz
4. Heinrich LXIII, Prince Reuss of Köstritz
9. Baroness Wilhelmine von Geuder genannt Rabensteiner
2. Heinrich IV, Prince Reuss of Köstritz
10. Heinrich, Count of Stolberg-Wernigerode
5. Countess Eleonore of Stolberg-Wernigerode
11. Princess Johanna of Schönburg-Waldenburg
1. Eleonore Reuss of Köstritz
12. Heinrich XIII, Prince Reuss of Greiz
6. Heinrich XIX, Prince Reuss of Greiz
13. Princess Wilhelmine Louise of Nassau-Weilburg
3. Princess Luise Reuss of Greiz
14. Prince Charles de Rohan-Rochefort
7. Princess Gasparine de Rohan-Rochefort
15. Marie-Louise de Rohan-Guéméné

Eleonore Reuss of Köstritz House of Reuss-Köstritz Cadet branch of the 1917 Born: 22 August 1860 Died: 12 September
Royal titles
Vacant Title last held by Marie Louise of Bourbon-Parma	Princess of Bulgaria; 28 February – 22 September 1908	Title abolished
Vacant Title last held by Dragana of Serbia	Tsaritsa of Bulgaria; 22 September 1908 – 12 September 1917	Vacant Title next held by Giovanna of Italy
