= Orders, decorations, and medals of Bulgaria =

Orders, decorations and medals of Bulgaria are regulated by the law on the Orders and Medals of the Republic of Bulgaria of 29 May 2003.

The National Military History Museum of Bulgaria in Sofia currently has over 150 Bulgarian Orders in the collection, which it has acquired over 85 years in co-operation with the Bulgarian State Mint, which are in the main part imperial, including Orders awarded to Knjaz Alexander, Ferdinand and Tsar Boris III along with other high-ranking military leaders of the Royal Bulgarian Army.

- Note: Awards shown without ribbons are/were worn in full at all times. Also, like most items which are created by the minting process, mint errors of awards do exist, some which were still issued despite the error (such as off-centred artwork) and some which were discarded (such as incorrect reverses). These mint errors add dimensions to the art of collecting such items. Main error types will also be listed here also. Numbers of Orders/Medals that were in use in both The Tsardom of Bulgaria and The People's Republic of Bulgaria show the number awarded during both regimes and not just under the single regime.

== Principality of Bulgaria/Third Bulgarian Tsardom (29 April 1879 – 15 September 1946) ==
The decorations of the Principality of Bulgaria (29 April 1879 – 5 October 1908) and the Third Bulgarian Tsardom (5 October 1908 – 15 September 1946) were divided into orders, medals and honorary insignia. Orders were awarded to civilians and military personnel for particularly great merits in service of the state (For example, commanding an army to a victory). Honorary insignia (Badges) were awarded for a specific merit or achievement or due to a specific event (For example, being wounded in action) and medals were presented on the occasion of a political or historic event or for merit (For example, on the anniversary of independence). Most of the Imperial commemorative medals were only issued once, to participants at the commemorated event and only the highest level personnel could be expected to be at all these events during their term in high status society. No-one was issued every commemorative medal, as during the turbulence of coups, counter-coups and change of monarchs, the high level society was in near constant change.

The Principality of Bulgaria's first order was created with Article 59 of the Tarnovo Constitution, The Order of Bravery, which came into force on 1 January 1880 (The order itself shows the date 1879 on the reverse). The highest Tsardom of Bulgaria award was the Order of Saint Cyril And Saint Methodius awarded to those who brought outstanding excellence to the culture of the Tsardom of Bulgaria (The People's Republic of Bulgaria also created an Order of the same title in three classes but that was a far lower level award for merit in education and science and is not to be confused).

=== Orders ===
Badge And Ribbon	Name (English/Bulgarian/Transliterated)	Creation Date - Cessation Date	Description	Award Count
The Order "For Bravery" / Ордена „За Храброст“ / Ordena "Za Hrabrost"
	Grand Cross of The; Order "For Bravery"/ Велик Кръст На; Ордена „За Храброст“/ Velik Krast Na; Ordena "Za Hrabrost"	1 January 1880 – 15 September 1946	Awarded only to the ruler of the state who is the order's Grand Master as well.	3
	Order "For Bravery"; 1st Class 1st Grade. Орден „За Храброст“ I Степен 1 Клас. Orden "Za Hrabrost" parva Stepen parvi Klas.	1 January 1880 / 15 September 1946	The highest rank of the order "For Bravery" awarded for exceptional actions in the face of remarkable danger.	
	Order "For Bravery"; 1st Class 2nd Grade. Орден „За Храброст“ I Степен 2 Клас. Orden "Za Hrabrost"; I Stepen 2 Klas.	1886 / 15 September 1946	The highest rank of the order "For Bravery" awarded to high rank military officers for leadership qualities in the face of remarkable danger.	
	Order "For Bravery"; 2nd Class. Орден „За Храброст“ II Степен. Orden "Za Hrabrost"; II Stepen.	1 January 1880 / 15 September 1946	The second rank of the order "For Bravery" awarded for exceptional actions in the face of remarkable danger.	
	Order "For Bravery"; 3rd Class 1st Grade. Орден „За Храброст“ III Степен 1 Клас. Orden "Za Hrabrost"; III Stepen 1 Klas.	1 January 1880 / 15 September 1946	The third rank of the order "For Bravery" awarded for exceptional actions in the face of remarkable danger.	
	Order "For Bravery"; 3rd Class 2nd Grade. Орден „За Храброст“ III Степен 2 Клас. Orden "Za Hrabrost"; III Stepen 2 Klas.	1915 / 15 September 1946	The third rank of the order "For Bravery" awarded to low rank military officers for leadership qualities in the face of remarkable danger.	
	Order "For Bravery"; 4th Class 1st Grade. Орден „За Храброст“ IV Степен 1 Клас. Orden "Za Hrabrost"; IV Stepen 1 Klas.	1 January 1880 / 15 September 1946	The fourth rank of the order "For Bravery" awarded for exceptional actions in the face of remarkable danger. There are 6 variations of this Order: Four from the first world war, firstly dated 1915, then 1915–1916, then 1915–1917 and finally 1915–1918. During the second world war two additional variations were issued: one dated 1941 (whilst Bulgaria was part of the Axis), and one undated which was issued in 1945.	
	Order "For Bravery"; 4th Class 2nd Grade. Орден „За Храброст“ IV Степен 2 Клас. Orden "Za Hrabrost"; IV Stepen 2 Klas.	1915 / 15 September 1946	The fourth rank of the order "For Bravery" awarded to high rank soldiers for leadership qualities in the face of remarkable danger.	
Soldier Cross "For Bravery"/Войнишки кръст „За Храброст“/ Voynishki Krast "Za Hrabrost"
	Soldier Cross "For Bravery"; 1st Class. Войнишки Кръст „За Храброст“ I Степен. Voynishki Krast "Za Hrabrost"; I Stepen.	1 January 1880 / 15 September 1946	Awarded to low rank soldiers for exceptional actions in the face of remarkable danger. There are 5 variations of this award: The first was issued until 1915 and is dated 1879 on the reverse (as are all variations) and undated on the front with 7 symbols; The second variation, which was issued from 1915 to 1918 is dated 1915 on the obverse and has Bulgaria written in Cyrillic; The third variation is also dated 1915 on the obverse and has Bulgaria written in Cyrillic, with the exception of the letter I which is in Latin; The fourth variation is dated 1941; The fifth variation which was created in 1945 is undated, but has a star and two lines on the obverse. The award is issues in 4 classes: The first class of this award differs only from the second class by the way of the first class having an additional ribbon sewn across the ribbon suspension.	
	Military Cross "For Bravery"; 2nd Class. Войнишки Кръст „За Храброст“ II Степен. Voynishki Krast "Za Hrabrost"; II Stepen.	1 January 1880 / 15 September 1946	Awarded to low rank soldiers for exceptional actions in the face of remarkable danger. The second class of this award differs only from the first class by the way of the first class having an additional ribbon sewn across the ribbon suspension.	
	Military Cross "For Bravery"; 3rd Class. Войнишки Кръст „За Храброст“ III Степен. Voynishki Krast "Za Hrabrost"; III Stepen.	1 January 1880 / 15 September 1946	Awarded to low rank soldiers for exceptional actions in the face of remarkable danger. The third class of this award differs only from the fourth class by the way of the third class having an additional ribbon sewn across the ribbon suspension, and differs only from the first and second class by the metal the award is made of, (the first and second class being golden, and third and fourth class being silver).	
	Military Cross "For Bravery"; 4th Class. Войнишки Кръст „За Храброст“ IV Степен. Voynishki Krast "Za Hrabrost"; IV Stepen.	1 January 1880 / 15 September 1946	Awarded to low rank soldiers for exceptional actions in the face of remarkable danger. The fourth class of this award differs only from the second class by the metal the award is made of, (the second class is golden and the fourth class is silver).	
	Military Cross "For Bravery"; 4th Class. Войнишки Кръст „За Храброст“ IV Степен. Voynishki Krast "Za Hrabrost"; IV Stepen.	September 1946/ September 1989		
Order of Saint Alexander
	Grand Cross of The; Order of Saint Alexander. Орден „Свети Александър“ Велик Кръст. Orden "Sveti Aleksandar"; Velik Krast.	25 December 1881 / 15 September 1946		
	Order of Saint Alexander; 1st Class. Орден „Свети Александър“ I Степен. Orden "Sveti Aleksandar"; I Stepen.	25 December 1881 / 15 September 1946		
	Order of Saint Alexander; 2nd Class / Grand Officer's Cross. Орден „Свети Александър“ II Степен, Голям Офицерски Кръст. Orden "Sveti Aleksandar"; II Stepen, Golyam Ofitserski Krast.	25 December 1881 / 15 September 1946		
	Order of Saint Alexander; 3rd Class / Commander's Cross. Орден „Свети Александър“ III Степен, Командирски Кръст. Orden "Sveti Aleksandar"; III Stepen, Komandirski Krast.	25 December 1881 / 15 September 1946		
	Order of Saint Alexander; 4th Class / Officer's Cross. Орден „Свети Александър“ IV Степен, Офицерски Кръст. Orden "Sveti Aleksandar"; IV Stepen, Ofitserski Krast.	25 December 1881 / 15 September 1946		
	Order of Saint Alexander; 5th Class / Knight's Cross. Орден „Свети Александър“ V Степен, Кавалерски Кръст. Orden "Sveti Aleksandar"; V Stepen, Kavalerski Krast.	25 December 1881 / 15 September 1946		
	Order of Saint Alexander; 6th Class / Silver Cross. Орден „Свети Александър“ VI Степен, Сребърен Кръст. Orden "Sveti Aleksandar"; VI Stepen, Srebaren Krast.	25 December 1881 / 15 September 1946		
"For Merit"
	Order "For Merit". Орден „За Заслуга“. Orden "Za Zasluga".	24 March 1883 / 15 September 1946	Awarded to military officers for merits during war time (with Order's "For Bravery" ribbon) or during peace time (with Order's of Saint Alexander ribbon).	
	Order "For Civil Merit"; 1st Class. Орден „За Гражданска Заслуга“ I Степен. Orden "Za Grazhdanska Zasluga"; I Stepen.	August 1891 / 15 September 1946		
	Order "For Civil Merit"; 2nd Class. Орден „За Гражданска Заслуга“ II Степен. Orden "Za Grazhdanska Zasluga"; II Stepen.	August 1891 / 15 September 1946		
	Order "For Civil Merit"; 3rd Class. Орден „За Гражданска Заслуга“ III Степен. Orden "Za Grazhdanska Zasluga"; III Stepen.	August 1891 / 15 September 1946		
	Order "For Civil Merit"; 4th Class. Орден „За Гражданска Заслуга“ IV Степен. Orden "Za Grazhdanska Zasluga"; IV Stepen.	August 1891 / 15 September 1946		
	Order "For Civil Merit"; 5th Class. Орден „За Гражданска Заслуга“ V Степен. Orden "Za Grazhdanska Zasluga"; V Stepen.	August 1891 / 15 September 1946		
	Order "For Civil Merit"; 6th Class. Орден „За Гражданска Заслуга“ VI Степен. Orden "Za Grazhdanska Zasluga"; VI Stepen.	August 1891 / 15 September 1946		
	Grand Cross of The; Order "For Military Merit". Орден „За Военна Заслуга“ Велик Кръст. Orden "Za Voenna Zasluga"; Velik Krast.	1933 / 15 September 1946		
	Order "For Military Merit"; 1st Class. Орден „За Военна Заслуга“ I Степен. Orden "Za Voenna Zasluga"; I Stepen.	18 May 1900 / 15 September 1946		
	Order "For Military Merit"; 2nd Class / Grand Officer's Cross. Орден „За Военна Заслуга“ II Степен, Голям Офицерски Кръст. Orden "Za Voenna Zasluga"; II Stepen, Golyam Ofitserski Krast.	18 May 1900 / 15 September 1946		
	Order "For Military Merit"; 3rd Class / Commander's Cross. Орден „За Военна Заслуга“ III Степен, Командирски Кръст. Orden "Za Voenna Zasluga"; III Stepen, Komandirski Krast.	18 May 1900 / 15 September 1946		
	Order "For Military Merit"; 4th Class / Officer's Cross. Орден „За Военна Заслуга“ IV Степен, Офицерски Кръст. Orden "Za Voenna Zasluga"; IV Stepen, Ofitserski Krast.	18 May 1900 / 15 September 1946		
	Order "For Military Merit"; 5th Class / Knight's Cross. Орден „За Военна Заслуга“ V Степен, Кавалерски Кръст. Orden "Za Voenna Zasluga"; V Stepen, Kavalerski Krast.	18 May 1900 / 15 September 1946		
	Order "For Military Merit"; 6th Class / Silver Cross. Орден „За Военна Заслуга“ VI Степен, Сребърен Кръст. Orden "Za Voenna Zasluga"; VI Stepen, Srebaren Krast.	18 May 1900 / 15 September 1946		
The Order of Saints Cyril and Methodius
	Grand Cross of The Order of Saints Cyril and Methodius; Орден „Св. Св. Равноапостоли Кирил и Методий“ Orden "Sv. Sv. Ravnoapostoli Kiril i Metodiy".	18 May 1909 / 15 September 1946		

=== Medals ===
Badge And Ribbon	Name (English/Bulgarian/Translit)	Creation Date / Cessation Date	Description	Number Awarded
	"For The Coronation of Knjaz Alexander of Battenberg".	c. 8 July 1879		c. 200
	For Liberation 1877–78. За Освобождението 1877–78. Za Osvobozhdenieto 1877–78.	19 July 1880		
	For The Allocation of War Banners to the Bulgarian Army in 1881.	30 August 1881 / 30 August 1881	Personally awarded by Knjaz Alexander during a ceremony on 30 August 1881. There are two variations of this medal, one with a crown between the ribbon and medal and one without.	c.50
	Gold Medal "For Merit"; With Crown And Diamonds. За Заслуга; Za Zasluga	1886	This was a unique award. Awarded only to Stefan Stambolov, the regent of Bulgaria from 28 August 1886 to 3 September 1886 and from 7 September 1886 to 7 July 1887.	1
	Gold Medal For Merit; With Crown. За Заслуга; Za Zasluga	25 December 1881 / 15 September 1946	This was awarded with crown above the medal (and later a reef replaced the crown during the regency). There are 6 variations of the obverse, Knjaz Alexander, Knjaz Ferdinand, Tsar Ferdinand I, Tsar Boris III, Tsar Boris III (With "A" missing from Bulgaria) and a regent coat of arms. If awarded during periods of war (14–28 November 1885, 8 October 1912 – 30 May 1913, 29 June – 31 July 1913, 14 October 1918 – 29 September 1918 and 1 March 1941 – 9 May 1945) this medal was issued with an alternate war time ribbon. All of these factors together make a great many different variations of this award. 7 of the 66 of these awarded were the Knjaz Ferdinand variation, 6 of which were issued to foreign heads of state.	66
	Gold Medal For Merit. За Заслуга; Za Zasluga	25 December 1881 / 15 September 1946	This was awarded without crown/reef above the medal. There are 6 variations of the obverse, Knjaz Alexander, Knjaz Ferdinand, Tsar Ferdinand I, Tsar Boris III, Tsar Boris III (With "A" missing from Bulgaria) and a regent coat of arms. If awarded during periods of war (14–28 November 1885, 8 October 1912 – 30 May 1913, 29 June – 31 July 1913, 14 October 1918 – 29 September 1918 and 1 March 1941 – 9 May 1945) this medal was issued with an alternate war time ribbon. All of these factors together make a great many different variations of this award.	
	Silver Medal For Merit; With Crown. За Заслуга; Za Zasluga	25 December 1881 / 15 September 1946	This was awarded with crown above the medal (and later a reef replaced the crown during the regency). There are 6 variations of the obverse, Knjaz Alexander, Knjaz Ferdinand, Tsar Ferdinand I, Tsar Boris III, Tsar Boris III (With "A" missing from Bulgaria) and a regent coat of arms. If awarded during periods of war (14–28 November 1885, 8 October 1912 – 30 May 1913, 29 June – 31 July 1913, 14 October 1918 – 29 September 1918 and 1 March 1941 – 9 May 1945) this medal was issued with an alternate war time ribbon. All of these factors together make a great many different variations of this award.	
	Silver Medal For Merit. За Заслуга; Za Zasluga	25 December 1881 / 15 September 1946	This was awarded without crown/reef above the medal. There are 6 variations of the obverse, Knjaz Alexander, Knjaz Ferdinand, Tsar Ferdinand I, Tsar Boris III, Tsar Boris III (With "A" missing from Bulgaria) and a regent coat of arms. If awarded during periods of war (14–28 November 1885, 8 October 1912 – 30 May 1913, 29 June – 31 July 1913, 14 October 1918 – 29 September 1918 and 1 March 1941 – 9 May 1945) this medal was issued with an alternate war time ribbon. All of these factors together make a great many different variations of this award.	
	Bronze Medal For Merit; With Crown. За Заслуга	25 December 1881 / 15 September 1946	This was awarded with crown above the medal (and later a reef replaced the crown during the regency). There are 6 variations of the obverse, Knjaz Alexander, Knjaz Ferdinand, Tsar Ferdinand I, Tsar Boris III, Tsar Boris III (With "A" missing from Bulgaria) and a regent coat of arms. If awarded during periods of war (14–28 November 1885, 8 October 1912 – 30 May 1913, 29 June – 31 July 1913, 14 October 1918 – 29 September 1918 and 1 March 1941 – 9 May 1945) this medal was issued with an alternate war time ribbon. All of these factors together make a great many different variations of this award.	
	Bronze Medal For Merit. За Заслуга	25 December 1881 / 15 September 1946	This was awarded without crown/reef above the medal. There are 6 variations of the obverse, Knjaz Alexander, Knjaz Ferdinand, Tsar Ferdinand I, Tsar Boris III, Tsar Boris III (With "A" missing from Bulgaria) and a regent coat of arms. If awarded during periods of war (14–28 November 1885, 8 October 1912 – 30 May 1913, 29 June – 31 July 1913, 14 October 1918 – 29 September 1918 and 1 March 1941 – 9 May 1945) this medal was issued with an alternate war time ribbon. All of these factors together make a great many different variations of this award.	
	"In Memory of the Glorious 1885 Campaign". / "In Memory of the Glorious War of 1885". Silver Class; Въ Память Славной 1885 Кампаній./ Въ Паметъ На Славната Война Въ 1885 Год. V Pamyaty Slavnoy 1885 Kampaniy./ Va Pamet Na Slavnata Voyna Va 1885 God.	19 February 1886 / 7 September 1886	Awarded to Bulgarian veterans of the 14–28 November 1885 war with the Kingdom of Serbia during the reign of Alexander I. This medal was replaced by the "For Participation in the Serbo-Bulgarian War 1885" medal after the abdication of Alexander I. The medal was issued in two variations one with Russian text and one with Bulgarian text.	
	"In Memory of the Glorious 1885 Campaign"./ "In Memory of the Glorious War of 1885". Bronze Class; Въ Память Славной 1885 Кампаній./ Въ Паметъ На Славната Война Въ 1885 Год. Va Pamyaty Slavnoy 1885 Kampaniy./ Va Pamet Na Slavnata Voyna Va 1885 God.	19 February 1886 / 7 September 1886	Awarded to Bulgarian veterans of the 14–28 November 1885 war with the Kingdom of Serbia during the reign of Alexander I. This medal was replaced by the "For Participation in the Serbo-Bulgarian War 1885" medal after the abdication of Alexander I. The medal was issued in two variations one with Russian text and one with Bulgarian text.	
	For Participation in the Serbo-Bulgarian War 1885; Silver Class. За Участие В Сръбско-Българската Война 1885. Za Uchastie V Srabsko-Balgarskata Vojna 1885.	14 November 1886 / ????	Awarded to Bulgarian veterans of the 14–28 November 1885 war with the Kingdom of Serbia.	c. 60,000
	"For Participation in the Serbo-Bulgarian War 1885"; Bronze Class. За Участие В Сръбско-Българската Война 1885. Za Uchastie V Srabsko-Balgarskata Vojna 1885.	14 November 1886 / ????	Awarded to Bulgarian veterans of the 14–28 November 1885 war with the Kingdom of Serbia.	c. 30,000
	For The Accession of Knjaz Ferdinand I 1st Class. За Възшествието На Княз Фердинанд I. Za Vazshestvieto Na Knyaz Ferdinand I.	c. 7 July 1887 / ????		
	"For The Accession of Knjaz Ferdinand I"; 2nd Class. За Възшествието На Княз Фердинанд I. Za Vazshestvieto Na Knyaz Ferdinand I.	c. 7 July 1887 / ????		
	"For The Accession of Knjaz Ferdinand I"; 3rd Class. За Възшествието На Княз Фердинанд I. Za Vazshestvieto Na Knyaz Ferdinand I.	c. 7 July 1887 / ????		699
	"For The Accession of Knjaz Ferdinand I"; 4th Class. За Възшествието На Княз Фердинанд I. Za Vazshestvieto Na Knyaz Ferdinand I.	c. 7 July 1887 / ????		1019
	"For The Accession of Knjaz Ferdinand I"; 5th Class. За Възшествието На Княз Фердинанд I. Za Vazshestvieto Na Knyaz Ferdinand I.	c. 7 July 1887 / ????		475
	"For The Completion of the Jambol-Burgas Railway"; Gold Class.	4 May 1890 / 4 May 1890		
	"For The Completion of the Jambol-Burgas Railway"; Silver Class.	4 May 1890 / 4 May 1890		
	"For The Completion of the Jambol-Burgas Railway"; Bronze Class.	4 May 1890 / 4 May 1890		
	10 Years Distinguished Service Cross.	1889 / 15 September 1946	There are 4 variations of this award a Ferdinand I officer's version, a Boris III officer's version and a Boris III N.C.O. version established on 7 April 1933. The fourth variation is a unique variation issued only to the Tsar Boris III.	
	20 Years Distinguished Service Cross.	1889 / 15 September 1946	There are 4 variations of this award a Ferdinand I officer's version, a Boris III officer's version and a Boris III N.C.O. version established on 7 April 1933. The fourth variation is a unique variation issued only to the Tsar Boris III.	
	For The Wedding of Knyaz Ferdinand And Marie-Louise (Gold Class).	20 April 1893 / 20 April 1893		
	For The Wedding of Knyaz Ferdinand And Marie-Louise (Silver Class).	20 April 1893 / 20 April 1893		
	For The Wedding of Knyaz Ferdinand And Marie-Louise (Bronze Class).	20 April 1893 / 20 April 1893		
	For The 25th Anniversary The April Insurrection of 1876.	1901 /		
	Lifesaving Medal (1st Class).	28 October 1908 / 15 September 1946	Awarded to all Bulgarians for the rescue of people from natural (or other) disasters. There are 2 variations of this award a Ferdinand I version and a Boris III version.	
	Lifesaving Medal (2nd Class).	28 October 1908 / 15 September 1946	Awarded to all Bulgarians for the rescue of people from natural (or other) disasters. There are 2 variations of this award a Ferdinand I version and a Boris III version.	
	Lifesaving Medal (3rd Class).	28 October 1908 / 15 September 1946	Awarded to all Bulgarians for the rescue of people from natural (or other) disasters. There are 2 variations of this award a Ferdinand I version and a Boris III version.	
	For The Independence of Bulgaria 22 September 1908. За Независимостта На България 22 Септември 1908. Za Nezavisimostta Na Balgariya 22 Septembri 1908.	Early 1909 / 1909	Awarded to Bulgarians for the event of the proclamation of full Bulgarian independence. Diameter 40 mm, Thickness 1.9 mm.	11,490
	Red Cross Medal (Gold Class).	1939 / 15 September 1946	Awarded to everyone who had contributed with "merits to the Red Cross Society or to the cause of charity in general without distinction of sex, ethnic origin or nationality".	
	Red Cross Medal (Silver Class).	15 February 1918 / 15 September 1946	Awarded to everyone who had contributed with "merits to the Red Cross Society or to the cause of charity in general without distinction of sex, ethnic origin or nationality".	
	Red Cross Medal (Bronze Class).	15 February 1918 / 15 September 1946	Awarded to everyone who had contributed with "merits to the Red Cross Society or to the cause of charity in general without distinction of sex, ethnic origin or nationality".	
	For Participation in the Balkan Wars 1912–1913. За Участие В Балканските Войни 1912–913 г. Za Uchastie V Balkanskite Voyni 1912–913 g.	9 December 1933 / After December 1941	Awarded to Bulgarian participants of the 1912-1913 Balkan wars. There are 3 variations in this medal which are indicated by different ribbons (an addition of a white stripe for civilians and an additional black stripe for participants killed in action).	c. 300,000
	For Participation in the European War 1915–1918. За Участие В Европейската Война 1915–1918 г. Za Uchastie V Evropeyskata Voyna 1915–1918 g.	9 December 1933/ After December 1941	Awarded to Bulgarian and Bulgarian allied force participants of the "1915–1918" war (The Great War). There are 3 variations in this medal which are indicated by different ribbons (an addition of a white stripe for civilians and an additional black stripe for participants killed in action). Diameter 32.1 mm, Thickness 2.7 mm.	c. 249,000 (c. 50,000 to Bulgarians c. 199,000 to allied forces.)
	For Participation in the Patriotic War 1944–1945. За Участие В Отечествената Война 1944–1945 г. Za Uchastie V Otechestvenata Vojna 1944–1945 g.	9 September 1945 / After 1953	Awarded to Bulgarian or allied troops for participation in the war against the Axis from 9 September 1944 – 9 May 1945.	195,000+

=== Table Medals ===
Badge And Ribbon	Name (English/Bulgarian/Translit)	Creation Date / Cessation Date	Description	Number Awarded
	In This Sign Thou Shalt Conquer (Gold Class). In Hoc Signo Vinces.	1912 / 1912	Awarded to Tsar Ferdinand I.	1
	In This Sign Thou Shalt Conquer (Bronze Class). In Hoc Signo Vinces.	1912 / 1912		

=== Unofficial Medals ===
These "medals" were "issued" or "awarded" by various groups and organizations including government departments but are not fully recognized as officially awarded medals and are not authorized to be worn on official uniforms. Despite being unofficial medals, they are still held in high regard.

Badge And Ribbon	Name (English/Bulgarian/Translit)	Creation Date / Cessation Date	Description	Number Awarded
	Commemoration of the Death of H.R.H. Princess Marie Louise.	1899		
	1,000th Anniversary of the Birth of Tsar Boris I.	2 May 1907		
	Medal for the Coronation of Tsar Ferdinand I 1908.	22 September 1908		
	Commemoration of the Death of Michail Takev 1864–1920.	1920	Michail Takev was the Minister of Interior from 16 January 1908 – 10 September 1910 and then once again between 17 October – 28 November 1918 as part of a Democratic Party government.	
	Commemoration of the Death of Aleksandar Stambolijski.	1923		
	For The Proclamation of the St. Alexander Nevsky Cathedral Monument 12 September 1924.	12 September 1924		
	10th Anniversary of the Reign of Boris III; 50th Anniversary of Liberation From The Ottoman Empire; 1000th Anniversary of the Death of Simeon I.	1928	Diameter 22.2 mm, Thickness 1.3 mm.	
	For The Wedding of Tsar Boris III And Princess Giovanna of Savoy.	25 October 1930		

== People's Republic of Bulgaria (16 September 1946 – 10 November 1989) ==
- Note: Wider ribbons indicate 3 sided imperial type suspension/Narrower ribbons indicate 4/5 sided soviet type suspension.

With the exile of Tsar Simeon II all Imperial Bulgarian awards were discontinued and banned (Other than those created after the pro-soviet coup of 4 September 1944), including the wear of such awards. Traces of the Imperial award system were left in the following ways;

- Until 13 December 1950 various awards were issued with male and female type ribbons.
- Until 13 December 1950 male ribbons were still issued as a trifold, some medals such as the medal for "Participant in the Anti-Fascist Struggle" continued to have a trifold ribbon until the award was discontinued with the collapse of the People's Republic.
- Two new orders were created with the same name as imperial orders, The Order "(Saint) Cyril And (Saint) Methodius" and the Order "For Bravery".
- The Order of Civil Merit ribbon was used for the new Order of the People's Republic of Bulgaria (which had similar award criteria).

=== Honorary Titles ===
Badge And Ribbon	Name (English/Bulgarian/Translit)	Creation Date / Cessation Date	Description	Number Awarded
	Hero of the People's Republic of Bulgaria. Герой На Народна Република България. Geroy Na Narodna Republika Balgariya	15 June 1948 / 1990	Awarded to Bulgarian and foreign citizens for merits in defending Bulgaria and other countries allied to Bulgaria.	58
	Hero Of (Socialist) Labour. Герой На (Социалистическия) Труд. Geroy Na (Socialisticheskiya) Trud.	15 June 1948	Awarded for exceptional achievements in the sphere of agriculture, science, education, culture, arts as well as for contributing to technical progress. People awarded with this also received the Order of George Dimitrov. Renamed Hero of Socialist Labour from Hero of Labour on 13 December 1950. Notable Heroes include: Yuri Gagarin / (Soviet Union) / (Cosmonaut) / 28 April 1961; Todor Zhivkov / / (Politician) / 1961; General Ivan Mihajlov / / (Military/Politician) / 6 March 1962; Gherman Titov / (Soviet Union) / (Cosmonaut) / 27 September 1962; Valery Bykovsky / (Soviet Union) / (Cosmonaut) / 1963; Tsola Dragoycheva / (Bulgaria) / (Politician) / 1963; Valentina Tereshkova / (Soviet Union) / (Cosmonaut) / 9 September 1963; Pavel Belyayev / (Soviet Union) / (Cosmonaut) / 1965; Alexei Leonov / (Soviet Union) / ( Cosmonaut) / 1965; Dechko Uzunov / (Bulgaria) / (Artist) / 1967; Georgy Beregovoy / (Soviet Union) / (Cosmonaut) / 1970; Anton Yugov / (Bulgaria) / (Politician) / 1984; Dora Gabe / (Bulgaria) / (Poet); Elisaveta Bagriana / (Bulgaria) / (Poet); Andriyan Nikolayev / (Soviet Union) / (Cosmonaut)	1718
	People's Honorary Title. Почетно Звание „Народен“. Pochetno Zvanie "Naroden".	15 June 1948 / 30 December 1987	Awarded to people already awarded with the Honoured title for their exceptional merits in the field of arts, culture, science, education and health.	705
	Honoured Honorary Title. Почетно Звание „Заслужил“. Pochetno Zvanie "Zasluzhil"	15 June 1948 / 30 December 1987	Awarded to people for their exceptional merits in the field of arts, culture, science, education and health.	4753
	Laureate of the Dimitrov Prize (1st Class). Лауреат На Димитровска Награда (I Степен). Laureat Na Dimitrovska Nagrada (I Stepen).	23 May 1949	Awarded to people for their achievements in science, technology and culture. From 1960 onwards this class was the only class awarded as the 2nd and 3rd class awards ceased to be issued after 1959.	724
	Laureate of the Dimitrov Prize (2nd Class). Лауреат На Димитровска Награда (II Степен). Laureat Na Dimitrovska Nagrada (II Stepen).	23 May 1949 / 1959	Awarded to people for their achievements in science, technology and culture.	
	Laureate of the Dimitrov Prize (3rd Class). Лауреат На Димитровска Награда (III Степен). Laureat Na Dimitrovska Nagrada (III Stepen).	23 May 1949 / 1959	Awarded to people for their achievements in science, technology and culture.	
	Hero of Maternal Glory/ Mother Heroine. Майка Героиня; Mayka Geroinya	13 December 1950	Awarded to mothers who gave birth to and raised ten or more children. Originally named Hero of Maternal Glory this award was renamed Mother Heroine on 9 June 1952.	1116
	Laureate of the International Botev Prize. Лауреат На Международна Ботевска Награда. Laureat Na Mejudunarodna Botevska Nagrada.	24 July 1972 / 1986	Awarded to poets for their poetry and contribution to peace, democracy and social progress. Awarded to only four people every five years. Laureates: 1976: / Aleksej Surkov (Soviet Union) , Nicolás Guillén (Cuba) , László Nagy (Hungary) , Pierre Seghers (France); 1981: / Rafael Alberti (Spain) , Rasul Gamzatovich Gamzatov (Soviet Union) , Ahmad Al-Ahmad (Syria) , Miroslav Krleža (Socialist Federal Republic of Yugoslavia); 1986: / Dmitro Pavlychko (Soviet Union) , Mario Benedetti (Uruguay) , Nil Gilevich (Soviet Union) , Günter Wallraff (West Germany); This award ceased with the collapse of the People's Republic but was reinstated in 1996.	12
	Laureate of the Cyril And Methodius Prize.	29 April 1979	Awarded to prominent Bulgarian and foreign scientists who were specialists in the field of ancient Bulgarian and Slavonic studies.	
	Pilot-Cosmonaut of the People's Republic of Bulgaria.	18 January 1979	Awarded to Bulgarian Cosmonauts, the only two being Georgi Ivanov, 1979 and Aleksandar Panayotov Aleksandrov, 1988.	2
	Honoured Pilot. „Заслужил Летец“ "Zasluzhil Letec"	18 January 1979 / November 1987	Awarded to military and civilian pilots for considerable contributions or long and loyal service.	40 (28 – military, 10 – civilian, 2 – cosmonaut)

=== Orders ===
Badge And Ribbon	Name (English/Bulgarian/Translit)	Creation Date / Cessation Date	Description	Number Awarded
	National Order of Labour; Gold Class. Народен Орден На Труда; Златен Степен. Naroden Orden Na Truda; Zlaten Stepen.	21 June 1945 / 5 April 1991	Awarded to Bulgarian and foreign civilian/state labourers for excellence, outstanding achievements/innovations or excellence in organisation. Also awarded to artists and scientists for long service to the nation. Awarded until 1955 with either a tri-fold ribbon for males or a bow for females, after which the ribbon device was a 5 sided soviet design. The original design was created by D. Uzunov And L. Dimitrov. From 1977 the order was redesigned by B. Kozarevym and M. Markovym to a 5 sided star shape.	204870 from 1948 to 1988
	National Order of Labour; Silver Class. Народен Орден На Труда; Сребърен Степен. Naroden Orden Na Truda; Srebaren Stepen.	21 June 1945 / 5 April 1991		204870 from 1948 to 1988
	National Order of Labour; Bronze Class. Народен Орден На Труда; Бронзов Степен. Naroden Orden Na Truda; Bronzov Stepen.	21 June 1945 / 5 April 1991		204870 from 1948 to 1988
	Order of the 9 September 1944 / 1st Class. Орден „9 Септември 1944“ I Степен. Order "9 Septembri 1944"; I Stepen.	9 September 1945 / 5 April 1991	Awarded to Bulgarian and foreign citizens who took part in the armed insurrection of 9 September 1944 and later to participants in the founding and consolidating of the people's authority. There are 2 variations of this award for civilians and for military personnel. The military variation has additional swords. Worn on a plain red neck ribbon until 1958 and from then on worn on a 5 sided soviet style suspension on the chest. Designed by B. Angelushev.	73046 as of 1988
	Order of the 9 September 1944 / 2nd Class. Орден „9 Септември 1944“ II Степен. Order "9 Septembri 1944"; II Stepen.	9 September 1945 / 5 April 1991	Awarded to Bulgarian and foreign citizens who took part in the armed insurrection of 9 September 1944 and later to participants in the founding and consolidating of the people's authority. There are 2 variations of this award for civilians and for military personnel. The military variation has additional swords. Worn on a plain red neck ribbon until 1958 and from then on worn on a 5 sided soviet style suspension on the chest. Designed by B. Angelushev.	73046 as of 1988
	Order of the 9 September 1944 / 3rd Class. Орден „9 Септември 1944“ III Степен. Order "9 Septembri 1944"; III Stepen.	9 September 1945 / 5 April 1991	Awarded to Bulgarian and foreign citizens who took part in the armed insurrection of 9 September 1944 and later to participants in the founding and consolidating of the people's authority. There are 2 variations of this award for civilians and for military personnel. The military variation has additional swords. Worn on a plain red neck ribbon until 1958 and from then on worn on a 5 sided soviet style suspension on the chest. Designed by B. Angelushev.	73046 as of 1988
	Order of People's Liberty; 1st Class. Орден „Народная Свобода 1941–1944 гг“ I Степен. Orden "Narodnaya Svoboda 1941–1944 gg" I Stepen.	9 September 1945 / 5 April 1991	Awarded to Bulgarian and foreign citizens for the participation in the revolutionary fight of Bulgarian people. Worn as a screw-back badge until 1960 and from then on worn on a 5-sided Soviet-style suspension. There are four variations of this award's construction: a five-piece breast star (1945–1949), a four-piece breast star (1949–1958), a four-piece on a ribbon (1958 – c. 1970) and a single piece on a ribbon (c1970 onwards). Designed by B. Angelushev. Many counterfeit Orders of People's Liberty 2nd Classes have been offered for sale online. Some of the ways in which they differ from the real ones are: 1. Original orders have the bust facing right.; 2. Original orders have a screw on the reverse that will fit all other screw-back Bulgarian orders.; 3. Original orders are 4- or 5-piece items without pebbling on the reverse.; 4. Counterfeit orders will have one point of the star which looks rubbed down where a later ribbon-mounted order has been worn down.; 5. The original 4- and 5-piece construction orders were only issued from 1945 to 1960 and were not issued in large cases.	67153 from 1948 to 1988
	Order of People's Liberty; 2nd Class. Орден „Народная Свобода 1941–1944 гг“ II Степен. Orden "Narodnaya Svoboda 1941–1944 gg" II Stepen.	9 September 1945 / 5 April 1991		67153 from 1948 to 1988
	Order of the People's Republic of Bulgaria; 1st Class. Орден „Народна Република България“ I Степен. Orden "Narodna Republika Balgariya"; I Stepen.	18 June 1947 / 5 April 1991	Awarded to Bulgarians and foreign citizens for success and merits in different spheres of activity as a universal reward.	17686 as of 1988
	Order of the People's Republic of Bulgaria; 2nd Class. Орден „Народна Република България“ II Степен. Orden "Narodna Republika Balgariya"; II Stepen.	18 June 1947 / 5 April 1991	Awarded to Bulgarians and foreign citizens for success and merits in different spheres of activity as a universal reward.	17686 as of 1988
	Order of the People's Republic of Bulgaria; 3rd Class. Орден „Народна Република България“ III Степен. Orden "Narodna Republika Balgariya"; III Stepen.	18 June 1947 / 5 April 1991	Awarded to Bulgarians and foreign citizens for success and merits in different spheres of activity as a universal reward.	17686 as of 1988
	Order of the People's Republic of Bulgaria; 4th Class. Орден „Народна Република България“ IV Степен. Orden "Narodna Republika Balgariya"; IV Stepen.	18 June 1947 / 13 December 1950	Awarded to Bulgarians and foreign citizens for success and merits in different spheres of activity as a universal reward.	0
	Order of the People's Republic of Bulgaria; 5th Class. Орден „Народна Република България“ V Степен. Orden "Narodna Republika Balgariya"; V Stepen.	18 June 1947 / 13 December 1950	Awarded to Bulgarians and foreign citizens for success and merits in different spheres of activity as a universal reward.	0
	Order of Bravery; 1st Class. Орден „За Храброст“ I Степен. Orden "Za Hrabrost"; I Stepen.	15 June 1948 / 5 April 1991	Awarded to Military Personnel and Civilians for bravery and courage in battle or for strengthening the integrity of the country and public safety. Foreign soldiers of allied armies could also be awarded this order for participation in joint combat operations. There are two variations of this award, originally one which is numbered and then issued later, one which is unnumbered.	c10
	Order of Bravery; 2nd Class. Орден „За Храброст“ II Степен. Orden "Za Hrabrost"; II Stepen.	15 June 1948 / 5 April 1991	Awarded to Military Personnel and Civilians for bravery and courage in battle or for strengthening the integrity of the country and public safety. Foreign soldiers of allied armies could also be awarded this order for participation in joint combat operations. There are two variations of this award, originally one which is numbered and then issued later, one which is unnumbered.	0
	Order of Bravery; 3rd Class. Орден „За Храброст“ III Степен. Orden "Za Hrabrost"; III Stepen.	15 June 1948 / 5 April 1991	Awarded to Military Personnel and Civilians for bravery and courage in battle or for strengthening the integrity of the country and public safety. Foreign soldiers of allied armies could also be awarded this order for participation in joint combat operations. There are two variations of this award, originally one which is numbered and then issued later, one which is unnumbered.	50
	Order of Georgi Dimitrov. Орден „Георги Димитров“. Orden "Georgi Dimitrov".	17 June 1950 / 5 April 1991	Awarded to Bulgarian and foreign citizens for exceptional merit. This order was also automatically awarded to recipients of The Hero of the People's Republic of Bulgaria and The Hero of Socialist Labour titles. Originally designed by K. Lazarov and modified by O. Odabashyan. Awarded: Todor Zhivkov (4 times), Georgi Traykov (2 times), Petur Tanchev (2 times: 1970 and 1980), Tzola Dragoicheva (5 times), Georgi Atanasov (1 time: 1983), Dimitar Stoyanov (3 times: 1973, 1978 and 1989), Pencho Kubadinski (3 times), Alexi Ivanov (1 time: 1982), Pando Vanchev (2 times: 1979 and 1989), Grisha Filipov (3 times), Yanko Markov (3 times), Nikolai Georgiev (3 times), Grigor Stoichkov (2 times: 1972 and 1986), Ognyan Doynov (1 time: 1985), Stanko Todorov (2 times), Chudomir Alexandrov (1 time), Vasil Tzanov Vasilev (1 time: 1982), Vasil Tzanov Ivanov (1 time), Ivan Panev (1 time), Army General Dobry Djurov (3 times), Radoy Popivanov (1 time: 1983), Georgi Yordanov (2 times: 1971 and 1984), Hristo Hristov (2 times), Georgi Ivanov (cosmonaut) (first Bulgarian cosmonaut 1979) (1 time: 1979), Aleksandr Panayotov Aleksandrov (second Bulgarian cosmonaut 1988) (1 time: 1988), to General Ivan Mihajlov (6 times: 1955, 1957, 1959, 1962, 1967 and 1972).	4413 as of 1988
	Order of the Red Banner. Орден „Червене Знаме“. Orden "Chervene Zname".	13 December 1950 / 5 April 1991	Awarded to Bulgarian and Allied military personnel for distinction in battle or for merit in the strengthening of power and structure of the Bulgarian People's Army. There are two variations of this award, originally one which is numbered and then issued later, one which is unnumbered. Designed by O. Odabashyan.	
	Order of the Red Banner of Labour. Орден „Червене Знаме На Труда". Orden "Chervene Zname Na Truda".	13 December 1950 / 5 April 1991	Awarded to Bulgarian and Foreign civilians and associations for success in the development of the national economy or the state or public/scientific/cultural services of the country. There are five variations of this award, The first (c1950) is numbered and of multi-part construction with a nut and an angular recess in the reverse, The second (c. 1950–1969) is numbered and of a multi-part construction with a nut and a circular recess in the reverse, The third (c1970) is unnumbered a has a small nipple on the reverse, The fourth variation (c1970-1974) is unnumbered of a single part construction with a smooth reverse on a large ribbon and the fifth variation (c. 1974–1991) is unnumbered with a smooth reverse and on a small ribbon.	31031 as of 1988
	Order of Cyril And Methodius–1st Class. Орден „Кирил И Методий“ I Степен. Orden "Kiril I Metodiy"; I Stepen.	13 December 1950 / 5 April 1991	Awarded to Bulgarian and foreign citizens and organizations for merit in sciences / culture / information. There are two variations of this award, originally one which is numbered and then issued later, one which is unnumbered. Designed by P. Doychinov and O. Odabashja.	46074 as of 1988
	Order of Cyril And Methodius–2nd Class. Орден „Кирил И Методий“ II Степен. Orden "Kiril I Metodiy"; II Stepen.	13 December 1950 / 5 April 1991	Awarded to Bulgarian and foreign citizens and organizations for merit in sciences / culture / information. There are two variations of this award, originally one which is numbered and then issued later, one which is unnumbered. Designed by P. Doychinov and O. Odabashja.	46074 as of 1988
	Order of Cyril And Methodius–3rd Class. Орден „Кирил И Методий“ III Степен. Orden "Kiril I Metodiy"; III Stepen.	13 December 1950 / 5 April 1991	Awarded to Bulgarian and foreign citizens and organizations for merit in sciences / culture / information. There are two variations of this award, originally one which is numbered and then issued later, one which is unnumbered. Designed by P. Doychinov and O. Odabashja.	46074 as of 1988
	Order of Maternal Glory; 1st Class.	13 December 1950 / 5 April 1991	Awarded to Bulgarian mothers for raising 8 or 9 children. Three variations of this award exist: One on a ribbon which is numbered, latterly one on a ribbon which is unnumbered and then finally one on a metal suspension.	
	Order of Maternal Glory; 2nd Class.	13 December 1950 / 5 April 1991	Awarded to Bulgarian mothers for raising 6 or 7 children.	
	Order of Maternal Glory; 3rd Class.	13 December 1950 / 5 April 1991	Awarded to Bulgarian mothers for raising 4 or 5 children.	
	Order of the Rose; 1st Class. Орден На Розата; I Степен. Order Na Rozata; I Stepen.	4 August 1966 / 9 June 2003	Awarded to female foreigners for merit in the establishing friendly international relationships with The People's Republic of Bulgaria.	
	Order of the Rose; 2nd Class. Орден На Розата; II Степен. Order Na Rozata; I Stepen.	4 August 1966 / 9 June 2003	Awarded to female foreigners for merit in the establishing friendly international relationships with The People's Republic of Bulgaria.	
	Grand Cross of the Order of the Balkan Mountains. Орден „Стара Планина". Orden "Stara Planina".	4 August 1966 / 9 June 2003	Awarded to statesmen/ministers/diplomats/civil servants and foreign citizens for the establishment and strengthening of friendly international relations with The People's Republic of Bulgaria. If awarded for Military relationships the award was presented with swords. Designed by V. Starchev and K. Damjanov.	
	Order of the Balkan Mountains; 1st Class. Орден „Стара Планина". Orden "Stara Planina".	4 August 1966 / 9 June 2003	Awarded to statesmen/ministers/diplomats/civil servants and foreign citizens for the establishment and strengthening of friendly international relations with The People's Republic of Bulgaria. If awarded for Military relationships the award was presented with swords. Designed by V. Starchev and K. Damjanov.	
	Order of the Balkan Mountains; 2nd Class. Орден „Стара Планина". Orden "Stara Planina".	4 August 1966 / 9 June 2003	Awarded to statesmen/ministers/diplomats/civil servants and foreign citizens for the establishment and strengthening of friendly international relations with The People's Republic of Bulgaria. If awarded for Military relationships the award was presented with swords. Designed by V. Starchev and K. Damjanov.	
	Order of the Madar Horseman; 1st Class.	4 August 1966 / 9 June 2003	Awarded to foreign citizens for merit in establishment and strengthening of international relationships with The People's Republic of Bulgaria. If awarded to military personnel the order came with swords. Designed by D. Uzunov.	
	Order of the Madar Horseman; 2nd Class.	4 August 1966 / 9 June 2003	Awarded to foreign citizens for merit in establishment and strengthening of international relationships with The People's Republic of Bulgaria. If awarded to military personnel the order came with swords. Designed by D. Uzunov.	
	Order of Civil Valour And Merit; 1st Class.	4 August 1966 / 5 April 1991	Awarded to Bulgarian and foreign citizens for courage in lifesaving/protection of state property or in crime fighting. Designed by V. Starchev and K. Damyanov.	
	Order of Civil Valour And Merit; 2nd Class.	4 August 1966 / 5 April 1991	Awarded to Bulgarian and foreign citizens for courage in lifesaving/protection of state property or in crime fighting. Designed by V. Starchev and K. Damyanov.	
	Order of Civil Valour And Merit; 3rd Class.	4 August 1966 / 5 April 1991	Awarded to Bulgarian and foreign citizens for courage in lifesaving/protection of state property or in crime fighting. Designed by V. Starchev and K. Damyanov.	
	Order of Military Valour And Merit; 1st Class. Орден „За Военна Доблест и Заслуга“ I Степен. Orden "Za Voenna Doblest i Zasluga"; I Stepen.	28 May 1974 / 5 April 1991	Awarded to Military personnel, Workers of the Ministry of Defence and reservists for long distinguished and honourable service or for merit in strengthening of the power of armed forces and national security or for merit in combat training. Designed by B. Kozarev and M. Markov.	
	Order of Military Valour And Merit; 2nd Class. Орден „За Военна Доблест и Заслуга“ II Степен. Orden "Za Voenna Doblest i Zasluga"; II Stepen.	28 May 1974 / 5 April 1991	Awarded to Military personnel, Workers of the Ministry of Defence and reservists for long distinguished and honourable service or for merit in strengthening of the power of armed forces and national security or for merit in combat training. Designed by B. Kozarev and M. Markov.	
	Order of Labour Glory; 1st Class.	28 May 1974 / 5 April 1991	Awarded to industrial/construction/transport/agricultural labourers for selfless long-term work. Designed by L. Prakhov and P. Braykov.	
	Order of Labour Glory; 2nd Class.	28 May 1974 / 5 April 1991	Awarded to industrial/construction/transport/agricultural labourers for selfless long-term work. Designed by L. Prakhov and P. Braykov.	
	Order of Labour Glory; 3rd Class.	28 May 1974 / 5 April 1991	Awarded to industrial/construction/transport/agricultural labourers for selfless long-term work. Designed by L. Prakhov and P. Braykov.	
	Order "13 Centuries of Bulgaria". Орден „13 Века България". Orden "13 Veka Balgariya".	16 October 1981 / 5 April 1991	Awarded to Bulgarian and foreign citizens for the exceptionally great services to The People's Republic of Bulgaria. Designed by V. Starchev and M. Markov. Notable recipients include: Todor Zhivkov; Grisha Filipov; Georgi Atanasov; Georgi Djuagarov; Pencho Kubadiski; Georgi Jordanov; Dimitr Stanischev; Emil Hristov; Petr Djulgerov; Grigor Stoichkov; Alexi Ivanov; Vasil Vasilev; Hristina Stoeva; Ivan Panev; Radoj Popivanov; Patriarch Maxim; Bogomil Rajnov; Nicolai Ghiaurov; Nikola Strandjuanski; Vera Mutafchieva	110

=== Medals ===
Badge And Ribbon	Name (English/Bulgarian/Translit)	Creation Date / Cessation Date	Description	Number Awarded
	Patriotic War 1944–1945. Отечествена Война 1944–1945 г. Otechestvena Voyna 1944–1945 g.	9 September 1945	Awarded to Bulgarian or allied troops for participation in the war against the Axis from 9 September 1944 – 9 May 1945. Kept from before the establishment of the People's Republic of Bulgaria but with a changed ribbon and a new ribbon designed for those who had lost their life. Diameter 32.7 mm, Thickness 3 mm.	195,000+
	For Participation in the September Uprising 1923–Bronze Class. За Участие В Септемврийското Въстание 1923г Бронзов Степен. Za Uchastie V Septemvriyskoto Vastanie 1923g Bronzov Stepen.	15 September 1948 / 31 December 1950	Awarded to all surviving anti-fascist participants in the June and September 1923 Bulgarian uprisings on the event of the 25th anniversary.	2,450+
	For Participation in the September Uprising 1923–Silver Class. За Участие В Септемврийското Въстание 1923г.–Сребърен Степен. Za Uchastie V Septemvriyskoto Vastanie 1923g.–Srebaren Stepen.	15 September 1948 / 31 December 1950	Awarded to all surviving anti-fascist participants in the June and September 1923 Bulgarian uprisings on the event of the 25th anniversary.	10,040
	For Participation in the Anti-Fascist Struggle. За Участие В Антифашистката Борба. Za Uchastie V Antifashistkata Borba.	13 December 1950 / November 1989	Awarded to participants in struggle against fascism and capitalism. The last Bulgarian award instituted with a triangular suspension ribbon.	18,100+
	For Military Merit. За Боева Заслуга. Za Boeva Zasluga.	13 December 1950 / November 1989	Awarded to military personnel of the Armed Forces of the People's Republic of Bulgaria/Ministry of Internal Affairs for their skills and bravery in battle or for guarding the national borders/independence and security of the country. Originally this medal was issued with an Order document with the word Order crossed out and replaced with Medal, by 1953 Medal documents were being issued. This medal was awarded mainly in the 1951–1957 period. Variation 1, Diameter 33 mm, Thickness 2.4 mm. Variation 2, Diameter 33 mm, Thickness 2.7 mm.	80,000+
	For Labour Distinction. За Трудово Отличие. Za Trudovo Otlichie.	13 December 1950 / November 1989	Awarded to labourers for their achievements in industrial and social life of the People's Republic of Bulgaria. Variation 1, Diameter 33 mm, Thickness 1.9 mm. Variation 2, Diameter 33 mm, Thickness 2.4 mm.	
	For Motherhood; 1st Class. За Майчинство I Степен. Za Maychinstvo I Stepen.	13 December 1950 / November 1989	Awarded to Bulgarian mothers for birthing and raising 4 children.	
	For Motherhood; 2nd Class. За Майчинство II Степен. Za Maychinstvo II Stepen.	13 December 1950 / November 1989	Awarded to Bulgarian mothers for birthing and raising 3 children.	
	For Honourable Service to the Armed Forces of the People's Republic of Bulgaria 1st Class. За Безупречна Служба Въоръжени Сили НРБ I Степен. Za Bezuprechna Sluzhba Vaorazheni Sili NRB I Stepen.	18 July 1959 / November 1989	Awarded to personnel of the armed forces of the People's Republic of Bulgaria for at least 20 years long and faithful service.	
	For Honourable Service to the Armed Forces of the People's Republic of Bulgaria 2nd Class. За Безупречна Служба Въоръжени Сили НРБ II Степен. Za Bezuprechna Sluzhba Vaorazheni Sili NRB II Stepen.	18 July 1959 / November 1989	Awarded to personnel of the armed forces of the People's Republic of Bulgaria for at least 15 years long and faithful service.	
	For Honourable Service to the Armed Forces of the People's Republic of Bulgaria 3rd Class. За Безупречна Служба Въоръжени Сили НРБ III Степен. Za Bezuprechna Sluzhba Vaorazheni Sili NRB III Stepen.	18 July 1959/ November 1989	Awarded to personnel of the armed forces of the People's Republic of Bulgaria for at least 10 years long and faithful service.	
	For Faithful Honourable Service And Long Service Years in Bodies of the Ministry of Internal Affairs 1st Class. За Добросъвестна Безупречна Служба И Прослужени Години В Органите На Министерстерсвото На Вътрешните Работи I Степен. Za Dobrosavestna Bezuprechna Sluzhba I Prosluzheni Godini V Organite Na Ministerstersvoto Na Vatreshnite Raboti I Stepen.	27 August 1960/ November 1989	Awarded to personnel of the Ministry of Interior of the People's Republic of Bulgaria for at least 20 years long and faithful service.	
	For Faithful Honourable Service And Long Service Years in Bodies of the Ministry of Internal Affairs 2nd Class. За Добросъвестна Безупречна Служба И Прослужени Години В Органите На Министерстерсвото На Вътрешните Работи II Степен. Za Dobrosavestna Bezuprechna Sluzhba I Prosluzheni Godini V Organite Na Ministerstersvoto Na Vatreshnite Raboti II Stepen.	27 August 1960/ November 1989	Awarded to personnel of the Ministry of Interior of the People's Republic of Bulgaria for at least 15 years long and faithful service.	
	For Faithful Honourable Service And Long Service Years in Bodies of the Ministry of Internal Affairs 3rd Class. За Добросъвестна Безупречна Служба И Прослужени Години В Органите На Министерстерсвото На Вътрешните Работи III Степен. Za Dobrosavestna Bezuprechna Sluzhba I Prosluzheni Godini V Organite Na Ministerstersvoto Na Vatreshnite Raboti III Stepen.	27 August 1960/ November 1989	Awarded to personnel of the Ministry of Interior of the People's Republic of Bulgaria for at least 10 years long and faithful service.	
	10 Years Service to the Fire Services of the People's Republic of Bulgaria.	27 August 1960/	Awarded to personnel of the fire services of the People's Republic of Bulgaria for at least 10 years long and faithful service.	
	15 Years Service to the Fire Services of the People's Republic of Bulgaria.	27 August 1960/	Awarded to personnel of the fire services of the People's Republic of Bulgaria for at least 15 years long and faithful service.	
	20 Years Service to the Fire Services of the People's Republic of Bulgaria.	27 August 1960/	Awarded to personnel of the fire services of the People's Republic of Bulgaria for at least 20 years long and faithful service.	
	20th Anniversary of the Bulgarian People's Army. 20 Години БНА. 20 Godini BNA.	22 August 1964/	Awarded to personnel of the Bulgarian People's Army with at least 20 years military service and had contributed to the consolidation and enhancement of its fighting efficiency.	
	20 Years of the Organs of the Ministry of Interior. 20 Г. Органи На МВР. 20 G. Organi Na MVR.	22 August 1964/	Awarded to personnel of the Ministry of Interior of the People's Republic of Bulgaria also to ex-personnel who had faithfully served at least 10 years.	12,000+
	20th Anniversary of the Committee of State of the People's Republic of Bulgaria. 20 Години КДС. 20 Godini KDS.	22 August 1964/	Awarded to personnel of the Committee of State with at least 20 years military service and had contributed to the consolidation and enhancement of its efficiency.	
	10 Years Service to the Committee of State of the People's Republic of Bulgaria.	1965/1969	Awarded to personnel of the Committee of State of the People's Republic of Bulgaria for at least 10 years long and faithful service.	
	15 Years Service to the Committee of State of the People's Republic of Bulgaria.	1965/1969	Awarded to personnel of the Committee of State of the People's Republic of Bulgaria for at least 15 years long and faithful service.	
	20 Years Service to the Committee of State of the People's Republic of Bulgaria.	1965/1969	Awarded to personnel of the Committee of State of the People's Republic of Bulgaria for at least 20 years long and faithful service.	
	For Merit to the Bulgarian People's Army. За Заслуги Към БНА. Za Zaslugi Kam BNA.	23 December 1965/ November 1989	Awarded to personnel of the Bulgarian People's Army for merit in stabilising the defence of the People's Republic of Bulgaria and to civilians for expressing outstanding patriotism. Variation 1, Diameter 33 mm, Thickness (Rim) 2.8 mm, (Centre) 4.9 mm. Variation 2, Diameter 33.1 mm, Thickness (Rim) 2.5 mm, (Centre) 4.1 mm.	
	25th Anniversary of the Bulgarian People's Army. 25 Години БНА. 25 Godini BNA.	11 July 1968/	Awarded to personnel of the Bulgarian People's Army at least 10 years military service and also to foreign citizens for merits to the Bulgarian People's Army.	
	25th Anniversary of the Organs of the Ministry of Interior. 25 Г. Органи На МВР. 25 G. Organi Na MVR.	30 July 1968/	Awarded to personnel of the Ministry of Interior of the People's Republic of Bulgaria for at least 10 years faithful service/Merits against crime and also to foreign citizens for merits to the Ministry of Interior of the People's Republic of Bulgaria.	20,000+
	For Merit To Security And Public Order. За Заслуги За Сигурността И Обществения Ред. Za Zaslugi Za Sigurnostta I Obshtestveniya Red.	10 April 1969/	Awarded to Bulgarian or foreign citizens who had assisted to the bodies of the Ministry of Interior in their combat with foreign or home enemies of the country or people disturbing public order.	
	10 Years Service to the Construction Troops of the People's Republic of Bulgaria.	5 June 1969/	Awarded to personnel of the Construction Troops of the People's Republic of Bulgaria for at least 10 years long and faithful service.	
	15 Years Service to the Construction Troops of the People's Republic of Bulgaria.	5 June 1969/	Awarded to personnel of the Construction Troops of the People's Republic of Bulgaria for at least 10 years long and faithful service.	
	20 Years Service to the Construction Troops of the People's Republic of Bulgaria.	5 June 1969/	Awarded to personnel of the Construction Troops of the People's Republic of Bulgaria for at least 10 years long and faithful service.	
	25th Anniversary of People's Rule. 25 Години Народна Власт. 25 Godini Narodna Vlast.	10 July 1969/	Awarded to Bulgarian and foreign citizens who took an active participation in the fight against the fascism and capitalism. Also awarded for merits in building the socialism in the People's Republic of Bulgaria.	162,831
	25th Anniversary of Construction Troops of the People's Republic of Bulgaria.	12 August 1969/	Awarded to personnel of the Construction Troops of the People's Republic of Bulgaria for at least 10 years faithful service or for merits in the Construction Troops of the People's Republic of Bulgaria.	
	90th Anniversary of the Birth of Georgi Dimitrov.	12 June 1972/	Awarded to national and international communist movement leaders/politicians.	
	50th Anniversary of the People's Anti-Fascist Uprising 1923.	10 August 1973/	Awarded to all surviving anti-fascist participants in the June and September 1923 Bulgarian uprisings on the event of the 50th anniversary.	
	30th Anniversary of the Bulgarian People's Army. 30 Години БНА. 30 Godini BNA.	22 May 1974/	Awarded to personnel of the Bulgarian People's Army at least 10 years military service and also to foreign citizens for merits to the Bulgarian People's Army.	
	30th Anniversary of the Ministry of Interior. 30 Години МВР. 30 Godini MVR.	22 May 1974/	Awarded to Bulgarian and foreign citizens who cooperated with agencies of the Ministry of Interior and personnel of the Ministry of Interior.	30,000+
	30th Anniversary of the Construction Troops of the People's Republic of Bulgaria. 30 Години Строителин Войски На НРБ. 30 Godini Stroitelin Voyski Na NRB.	22 May 1974/	Awarded to all personnel of the Construction Troops of the People's Republic of Bulgaria for aiding development with at least 15 years long service.	
	International Brigades in Spain 1936–1939. Интернационални Бригади В Испания 1936–1939 г. Internatsionalni Brigadi V Ispaniya 1936–1939 g.	22 May 1974/	Awarded to all living veterans of the Bulgarian communist brigades which served in the Spanish Civil War 1936–1939. All award documents of this medal are numbered 462. Beware of Spanish made fakes of this award with different loops/different alloys/poor quality.	462
	Veteran of Labour.	22 May 1974/	Awarded to Bulgarians for long, high-productive and faithful work in all fields of public life.	
	Kliment Ohridski Medal.	22 May 1974/	Awarded to Bulgarian citizens and organizations for their merits and success in all fields of science, education and culture.	
	For Distinction in the Bulgarian People's Army.	22 May 1974/	Awarded to youth officers and sergeants of the Bulgarian People's Army for merits in serving the force and successful education and preparation of new recruits.	
	For Distinction in the Construction Troops of the People's Republic of Bulgaria.	22 May 1974/	Awarded to personnel of Construction Troops who aided in the development of the corps with at least 15 years service.	
	For Distinction in the Railway Troops of the People's Republic of Bulgaria.	22 May 1974/ 8 May 1978	Awarded to officers and sergeants of the Railway Troops of the People's Republic of Bulgaria for achievements in their career and education and in educating personnel.	
	For Merit in the Construction Troops of the People's Republic of Bulgaria.	22 May 1974/	Awarded to personnel of the Construction Troops for their merits for development and education of the personnel of the Construction Troops.	
	For Merit in the Railway Troops of the People's Republic of Bulgaria.	22 May 1974/ 8 May 1978	Awarded to personnel of the Railway Troops of the People's Republic of Bulgaria for merits.	
	30th Anniversary of the Socialist Revolution in Bulgaria.	2 September 1974/	Awarded to Bulgarian and foreign citizens who took an active participation in the fight against the fascism and capitalism.	106,162
	For Consolidation of Military Friendship.	4 March 1975/	Awarded to officers and sergeants of the military forces of the Warsaw Pact member nations. This medal was originally issued in very small numbers with all the flags of the Warsaw Pact nations enamelled but due to the difficulty and cost of production this medal was mainly issued without enamelling.	
	30th Anniversary of Victory Over Fascist Germany. 30 Години От Победата Над Фашистка Германия. 30 Godini Ot Pobedata Nad Fashistka Germaniya.	6 March 1975/	Awarded to Bulgarians who took participation in the anti-fascist struggle and revolution of 9 September 1944, relatives to the killed participators and serving personnel of the Bulgarian People's Army.	465,000+
	100th Anniversary of the April Uprising 1876.	17 January 1976/	Awarded to Bulgarians and foreigners in celebration of the April Uprising of 1876. 44 Bulgarian villages were also issued with a larger table medal for their participation in the Uprising.	
	25th Anniversary of Civil Defence of the People's Republic of Bulgaria. 30 Години Гражданска Отбрана На Народна Репувлика България; 30 Godini Grazhdanska Otbrana Na Naroda Republika Balgariya.	23 April 1976/	Awarded to Bulgarians who took participation in the construction of the National Civil Defence.	
	For Merit in the Civil Defence of the People's Republic of Bulgaria (1st Class).	23 April 1976/	Awarded to Bulgarians or foreigners for merits in the construction of the National Civil Defence or for contributing to the training/skill/organisation of National Civil Defence.	
	For Merit in the Civil Defence of the People's Republic of Bulgaria (2nd Class).	23 April 1976/	Awarded to Bulgarians or foreigners for merits in the construction of the National Civil Defence or for contributing to the training/skill/organisation of National Civil Defence.	
	For Merit in the Civil Defence of the People's Republic of Bulgaria (3rd Class).	23 April 1976/	Awarded to Bulgarians or foreigners for merits in the construction of the National Civil Defence or for contributing to the training/skill/organisation of National Civil Defence.	
	For Merit in the Sphere of Security of the Border.	26 May 1976/	Awarded to Bulgarian and foreign citizens for their active co-operation to the border guards and to border guards for bravery and long service.	
	100th Anniversary of the Bulgarian Red Cross.	16 November 1977/	Awarded to Bulgarian and foreign citizens and organizations for their contribution to the Bulgarian Red Cross.	c1000
	For Peace And Friendship Between The U.S.S.R. And The People's Republic of Bulgaria.	20 December 1977/	Awarded to foreign citizens and organisations that had contributed to establishing, developing and stabilising the peace and friendship between the U.S.S.R. and the People's Republic of Bulgaria.	
	For Friendship And Co-Operation with the People's Republic of Bulgaria.	20 December 1977/	Awarded to foreign citizens and organisations that had contributed to establishing, developing and stabilising the peace and friendship with the People's Republic of Bulgaria.	
	100th Anniversary of Liberation From Ottoman Rule 3 March 1878 – 3 March 1978. 100 Години От Освобождението На България От Османско Робство 3. III 1878 – 3. III 1978. 100 Godini Ot Osvobozhdenieto Na Balgariya Ot Osmansko Robstvo 3. III 1878 – 3. III 1978.	22 February 1978/	Awarded to Bulgarian and foreign citizens and organisations for their activity in organising the celebration of the 100th anniversary of the liberation of Bulgaria from Ottoman rule. Key Bulgarian towns and villages were also issued with a larger table medal.	
	For Distinction in the Troops of the Ministry of Transport of the People's Republic of Bulgaria.	8 May 1978/	Awarded to officers and sergeants of the troops of The Ministry of Transport of the People's Republic of Bulgaria for achievements in their career and education and in educating personnel. This medal is exactly the same in design as the For Distinction in the Railway Troops of the People's Republic of Bulgaria award it replaced when the department changed its name.	
	For Merit in the Troops of the Ministry of Transport of the People's Republic of Bulgaria.	8 May 1978/	Awarded to personnel of the troops of the Ministry of Transport of the People's Republic of Bulgaria for merits. This medal is exactly the same in design as the For Merit in the Railway Troops of the People's Republic of Bulgaria award it replaced when the department changed its name.	
	100th Anniversary of Bulgarian Communications.	8 May 1978/	Awarded to Bulgarian and foreign citizens and organisations for their contribution in development of communication in Bulgaria.	
	100th Anniversary of Bulgarian Customs. 100 Години Български Митници. 100 Godini Balgarski Mitnitsi.	29 January 1979/	Awarded to Bulgarian and foreign citizens and organisations for their contribution in development of custom houses in Bulgaria.	
	100th Anniversary of Sofia As Capital of Bulgaria. Сто Години София Столица На България. Sto Godini Sofiya Stolitsa Na Balgariya.	2 April 1979/	Awarded to Bulgarian citizens and organisations who contributed to the development of Sofia and to foreign citizens for their achievements in establishing co-operation and brotherhood between Bulgaria and Sofia with other nations and cities.	
	100th Anniversary of the Bulgarian State Health Care Service.	22 May 1979/	Awarded to Bulgarian and foreign scientists and organisations for their contribution in strengthening and developing the health system of the People's Republic of Bulgaria.	
	100th Anniversary of Bulgarian Geology.	21 August 1980/	Awarded to Bulgarian citizens and organisations for contributions to the development of geology in Bulgaria and also to foreign citizens for their research and development of Bulgarian geology.	
	1300th Anniversary of Bulgaria. 1300 Години България. 1300 Godini Balgariya.	16 October 1981/	Awarded to famous people, organisations and institutes in the country and also to foreigners who had promoted Bulgaria.	110954
	100th Anniversary of the Birth of Georgi Dimitrov. 100 Години От Рождението На Георги Димитров. 100 Godini Ot Rozhdenieto Na Georgi Dimitrov.	25 May 1982/	Awarded to national and international communist movement leaders/politicians.	107933
	For Merit in the Working People's Volunteer Detachments of the People's Republic of Bulgaria.	4 April 1984/	Awarded to volunteers for bravery and self-sacrifice in securing public order/national borders/safety of road traffic.	
	25th Anniversary of the Working People's Volunteer Detachments of the People's Republic of Bulgaria.	13 April 1984/	Awarded to volunteers for reinforcing the strength of the Working People's Volunteer Detachments of the People's Republic of Bulgaria.	
	40th Anniversary of Socialist Bulgaria. 40 Години Социалистическа България. 40 Godini Sotsialisticheska Balgariya.	27 July 1984/	Awarded to Bulgarian and foreign citizens who took an active participation in the fight against the fascism and capitalism.	116063
	80th Anniversary of the Revolutionary Trade Union Movement in Bulgaria. 80 Години Революцинно Профсъюзно Движение В България. 80 Godini Revolyutsinno Profsayuzno Dvizhenie V Balgariya.	8 October 1984/	Awarded to Bulgarian and foreign citizens who contributed to development of the Bulgarian professional unions.	
	40th Anniversary of Victory Over Hitler's Fascism. 40 Години От Победата Над Хитлерофашизма. 40 Godini Pobedata Nad Hitlerofashizma.	31 January 1985/	Awarded to serving Bulgarian military personnel along with living veterans of the war against Germany.	
	100th Anniversary of Bulgarian State Railways.	1988/		
	45th Anniversary of the Ministry of Interior of the People's Republic of Bulgaria.	1989/	Awarded to Bulgarian and foreign citizens for their co-operation with the Ministry of Interior of the People's Republic of Bulgaria and to current and former personnel for their contributions to the ministry.	

== Republic of Bulgaria (10 November 1989 – 29 May 2003) ==
With the collapse of The People's Republic of Bulgaria their award system was discontinued (Officially on 5 April 1991) with the exception of orders bestowed on foreign nationals. All communist and imperial awards were allowed to be worn. The soviet style 5 sided suspension was dropped, with the exception of the medal 50th Anniversary of Victory Over Hitler's Fascism, which had a 5 sided enamel suspension and the Imperial tradition of different ribbons for different sexes were reintroduced for certain awards. Between 5 April 1991 and the introduction of The Order For Loyal Service Under The Banner in 1994 there were no official state awards for Bulgarian citizens. As of 29 May 2003 a totally new award system was introduced and as of the 9 June 2003 the previous system was officially abolished.

=== Titles ===
Badge And Ribbon	Name (English/Bulgarian/Translit)	Creation Date / Cessation Date	Description	Number Awarded
	Laureate of the International Botev Prize. Лауреат На Международна Ботевска Награда. Laureat Na Mejudunarodna Botevska Nagrada.	1996	Awarded to poets for their poetry and contribution to peace, democracy and social progress. Laureates: 1996: Nadine Gordimer (South Africa); 2001: Branko Cvetkoski (North Macedonia); 2006: Yevgeny Aleksandrovich Yevtushenko (Russia); 2008: Aleksandr Isayevich Solzhenitsyn (Russia)	4

=== Orders ===
Badge And Ribbon	Name (English/Bulgarian/Translit)	Creation Date / Cessation Date	Description	Number Awarded
	Order of the Rose (1st Class).	4 August 1966 / 9 June 2003	Awarded to female foreigners for merit in the establishing friendly international relationships with The Republic of Bulgaria.	
	Order of the Rose (2nd Class).	4 August 1966 / 9 June 2003	Awarded to female foreigners for merit in the establishing friendly international relationships with The Republic of Bulgaria.	
	Grand Cross of the Order of the Balkan Mountains.	4 August 1966 / 9 June 2003	Awarded to foreign citizens for the establishment and strengthening of friendly international relations with The Republic of Bulgaria. If awarded for Military relationships the award was presented with swords. Designed by V. Starchev and K. Damyanov.	
	Order of the Balkan Mountains (1st Class).	4 August 1966 / 9 June 2003	Awarded to foreign citizens for the establishment and strengthening of friendly international relations with The Republic of Bulgaria. If awarded for Military relationships the award was presented with swords. Designed by V. Starchev and K. Damyanov.	
	Order of the Balkan Mountains (2nd Class).	4 August 1966 / 9 June 2003	Awarded to foreign citizens for the establishment and strengthening of friendly international relations with The Republic of Bulgaria. If awarded for Military relationships the award was presented with swords. Designed by V. Starchev and K. Damyanov.	
	Order of the Madar Horseman (1st Class).	4 August 1966 / 9 June 2003	Awarded to foreign citizens for merit in establishment and strengthening of international relationships with The Republic of Bulgaria. If awarded to military personnel the order came with swords. Designed by D. Uzunov.	
	Order of the Madar Horseman (2nd Class).	4 August 1966 / 9 June 2003	Awarded to foreign citizens for merit in establishment and strengthening of international relationships with The Republic of Bulgaria. If awarded to military personnel the order came with swords. Designed by D. Uzunov.	
	Order For Loyal Service Under The Banner (1st Class).	1994 / 9 June 2003	The reverse of this Order depicts the imperial Order of Bravery.	
	Order For Loyal Service Under The Banner (2nd Class).	1994 / 9 June 2003	The reverse of this Order depicts the imperial Order of Bravery.	
	Order For Loyal Service Under The Banner (3rd Class).	1994 / 9 June 2003	The reverse of this Order depicts the imperial Order of Bravery.	
	Order For Loyal Service Under The Banner (4th Class).	1994 / 9 June 2003	The reverse of this Order depicts the imperial Order of Bravery.	

=== Medals ===
Badge And Ribbon	Name (English/Bulgarian/Translit)	Creation Date / Cessation Date	Description	Number Awarded
	125th Anniversary of Bulgarian Railways.	1991		
	Veteran of the Wars.	1995	Awarded to all living Bulgarian veterans of any Bulgarian war.	
	50th Anniversary of Victory Over Hitler's Fascism.	9 May 1995	Awarded to all living Bulgarian veterans of the second world war.	
	75th Anniversary of Construction Troops.	14 June 1995		
	For Merit in Construction Troops (1st Class).	14 June 1995 / 29 May 2003		
	For Merit in Construction Troops (2nd Class).	14 June 1995 / 29 May 2003		

== Republic of Bulgaria (since 29 May 2003) ==
Legal organisation of the current Bulgarian Honours System is contained in the Constitution and the Decree on Intellectual Stimulation. Orders are established by the National Assembly and are awarded by the President of the Republic. The nomination of a foreign person is made by the Ministry of External Affairs, whereas Bulgarian nominees are selected by the Council of Ministers.

=== Titles ===
Badge And Ribbon	Name (English/Bulgarian/Translit)	Creation Date / Cessation Date	Description	Number Awarded
	Laureate of the International Botev Prize. Лауреат На Международна Ботевска Награда. Laureat Na Mejdunarodna Botevska Nagrada.	1996	Awarded to poets for their poetry and contribution to peace, democracy and social progress. Laureates: 1996: Nadine Gordimer (South Africa); 2001: Branko Cvetkoski (North Macedonia); 2006: Yevgeny Aleksandrovich Yevtushenko (Russia); 2008: Aleksandr Isayevich Solzhenitsyn (Russia)	4

=== Orders ===
Badge And Ribbon	Name (English/Bulgarian/Translit)	Creation Date / Cessation Date	Description	Number Awarded
	Order of Stara Planina (Order of The; Balkan Mountains)	29 May 2003	Awarded to Bulgarian citizens with particularly great merit to Bulgaria and foreigners for particularly great merit to bilateral relations and international cooperation. It has these variants and degrees: Sash ("Stara Planina with Ribbon"): For foreigners and rarely Bulgarian citizens. Includes white enamel star with medal and bow, gold badge with white enamel star, and miniature ribbon with badge.; 1st class ("Stara Planina without ribbon 1st degree", with swords (the military) and without swords (civilians)): Generally for Bulgarians. Includes suspension ribbon, gold medal (with swords for military, or without swords for civilian), silver badge with white enamel star, and miniature ribbon with badge.; 2nd class ("Stara Planina without ribbon 2nd degree", with swords (the military) and without swords (civilians)): Generally for Bulgarians. Includes suspension ribbon, silver medal (with swords for military, or without swords for civilian), silver badge with red enamel star, and miniature ribbon with badge.	
	Order of Saints Cyril and Methodius	29 May 2003	Awarded to people for particularly great contributions to the development of culture, art, education and science. Also with several variants and degrees.	
	Order of The; Madara Horseman (1st Class)	29 May 2003	Awarded to people for particularly great contributions to the consolidation of bilateral relations with Bulgaria.	
	Order of The; Madara Horseman (2nd Class)	29 May 2003	Awarded to people for particularly great contributions to the consolidation of bilateral relations with Bulgaria.	
	Order For Civil Merit (1st Class)	29 May 2003	Awarded to Bulgarian citizens for great merit to the development and consolidation of the civil society.	
	Order For Civil Merit (2nd Class)	29 May 2003	Awarded to Bulgarian citizens for great merit to the development and consolidation of the civil society.	
	Order For Military Merit (1st Class)	29 May 2003	Awarded to Bulgarians and foreigners who helped develop and strengthen the Bulgarian Army.	
	Order For Military Merit (2nd Class)	29 May 2003	Awarded to Bulgarians and foreigners who helped develop and strengthen the Bulgarian Army.	
	Order For Military Merit (3rd Class)	29 May 2003	Awarded to Bulgarians and foreigners who helped develop and strengthen the Bulgarian Army.	
	Order For Honour	29 May 2003	Awarded for exhibits of valour and heroism for the benefit of Bulgaria and its society.	

=== Medals ===
Badge And Ribbon	Name (English/Bulgarian/Translit)	Creation Date / Cessation Date	Description	Number Awarded
	For Merit	29 May 2003	Awarded to Bulgarians for merits in different areas of public life.	
	60th Anniversary of Victory in the Second World War.	2005	Awarded to all Bulgarian living veterans of the war and to non-veterans for merit.	

=== Table Medals ===
Badge And Ribbon	Name (English/Bulgarian/Translit)	Creation Date / Cessation Date	Description	Number Awarded
	100th Anniversary of Diplomatic Relations Between; Bulgaria and the United States of America.	2003		

=== Badges ===
Badge And Ribbon	Name (English/Bulgarian/Translit)	Creation Date / Cessation Date	Description	Number Awarded
	Stabilisation Force Iraq 1st Infantry Battalion Bulgarian Army Karbala Iraq 2004	2004		

== Recipients ==
Recipients of the Order of Stara Planina

Grand Crosses

- Souphanouvong
- Victoria, Crown Princess of Sweden

Cordons

- Valdas Adamkus
- Akihito
- Albert II of Belgium
- List of titles and honours of Beatrix of the Netherlands
- Carl XVI Gustaf
- Marie-Louise Coleiro Preca
- Emil Constantinescu
- Jean-Luc Dehaene
- Süleyman Demirel
- Haakon, Crown Prince of Norway
- Harald V of Norway
- Henrik, Prince Consort of Denmark
- Thomas Klestil
- Margrethe II of Denmark
- Mette-Marit, Crown Princess of Norway
- Queen Paola of Belgium
- Dilma Rousseff
- Nicolas Sarkozy
- Queen Silvia of Sweden
- Queen Sonja of Norway
- Hamad bin Khalifa Al Thani
- Victoria, Crown Princess of Sweden
- Zhelyu Zhelev

1st Class with Swords (Military)

- Kliment Boyadzhiev
- Radko Dimitriev
- Ivan Fichev
- Frederik, Crown Prince of Denmark
- Georgi Ivanov (cosmonaut)
- Prince Joachim of Denmark
- Stiliyan Kovachev
- Vasil Kutinchev
- Mihail Savov
- Georgi Todorov (general)
- Stefan Toshev

1st Class (Civilian)

- Aleksandr Panayotov Aleksandrov
- Cécilia Attias
- Irina Bokova
- Jaap de Hoop Scheffer
- Ignat Kaneff
- Krzysztof Krajewski
- Mary, Crown Princess of Denmark
- Louis Michel
- Alois Mock
- Bujar Nishani
- Colin Powell
- Anders Fogh Rasmussen

Other or Unknown Classes

- Ivan Abadzhiev
- Nicolae Ceaușescu
- Benita Ferrero-Waldner
- Gustáv Husák
- Islam Karimov
- Jarosław Lindenberg
- Tatyana Lolova
- Musa Manarov
- Georgi Markov
- Yordan Radichkov
- Wincenty Rzymowski
- Viktor Savinykh
- Anatoly Solovyev
- Vladimir Georgiyevich Titov
- Rangel Valchanov
