= Order of Georgi Dimitrov =

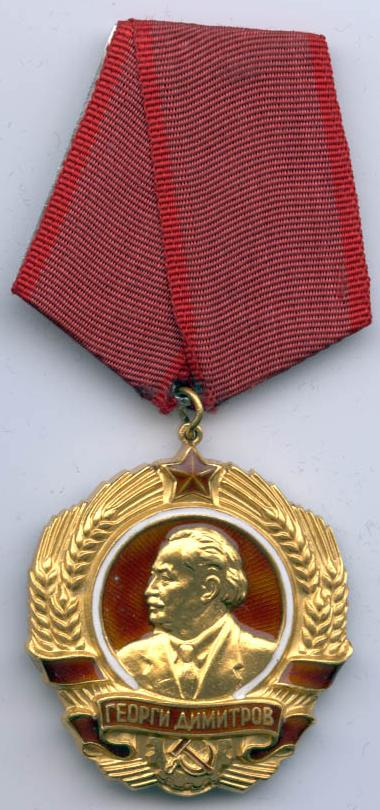
- Order of Georgi Dimitrov medal
- Type: Order
- Awarded for: Outstanding services to the defence and freedom of Bulgaria, or contributions to socialism
- Country: People's Republic of Bulgaria
- Presented by: the State Council of the People's Republic of Bulgaria
- Eligibility: Bulgarian and allied citizens
- Status: No longer awarded
- Established: 17 June 1950
- Final award: 1990
- Ribbon bar of the medal

Precedence
- Next (higher): Hero of Socialist Labour; Hero of the People's Republic of Bulgaria; Mother Heroine
- Equivalent: Order of Stara Planina; Order "13 Centuries of Bulgaria"
- Next (lower): Order of the Red Banner of Labour

The Order of Georgi Dimitrov (or Order of Georgy Dimitrov, Bulgarian: Орден Георги Димитров) was the highest award of the People's Republic of Bulgaria. It was instituted on 17 June 1950 and awarded to Bulgarians and foreigners for outstanding services to the defence and freedom of Bulgaria, or for contributions to socialism. The award was the Bulgarian equivalent of the Order of Lenin, whose general design it imitated.

The award was named after Georgi Dimitrov, the pre-eminent Bulgarian communist of the inter-war and immediate post-war years.

About 4,500 awards were made. The order was automatically awarded to recipients of the Hero of the People's Republic of Bulgaria and Hero of Socialist Labour titles. The award was withdrawn on 5 April 1991.

The medal consisted of a portrait of Dimitrov, surrounded by wreaths of grain, above a label with Dimitrov's name and topped by a small five-pointed star. It was of gilt, apart from the immediate background to Dimitrov's likeness, star and the name label, which were coloured dark red. It was hung on a dark red ribbon with red edges. It was originally designed by K. Lazarov and modified by O. Odabashyan.

== Recipients ==
- Soekarno
- Todor Zhivkov
- Petur Tanchev
- Georgi Atanasov
- Grisha Filipov
- Alexi Ivanov
- Pando Vanchev
- Haile Selassie
- Angel Dimitrov
- Krum Vassilev
- Kim Il Sung (twice)
- Leonid Brezhnev (thrice)
- Yuri Gagarin
- Valentina Tereshkova
- Wojciech Jaruzelski
- Phạm Hùng
- Yusuf M. Dadoo
- Lyubomir Pipkov
- Yusuf Dadoo
- Charilaos Florakis

== See also ==
- Hero of Labour
