= Zachari Zachariev =

Bulgarian general and politician (1904–1987)

Zachari Simeonov Zachariev
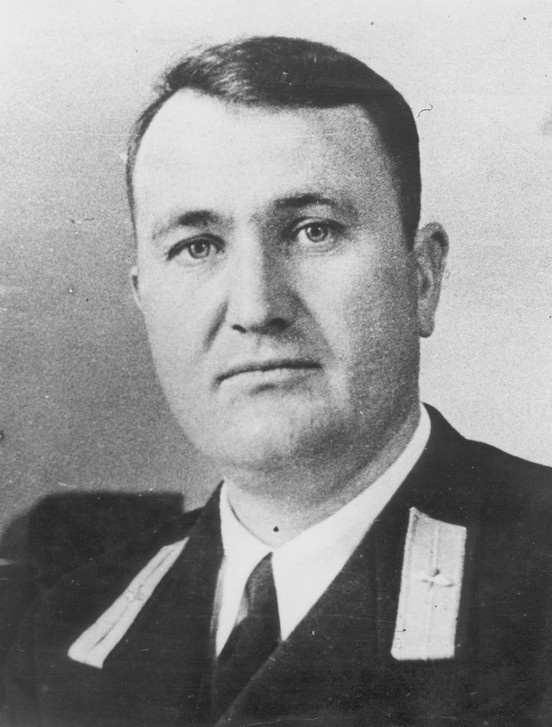
- Zachariev in 1938
- Native name: Захари Симеонов Захариев
- Born: 6 February 1904; Basarbovo, Kingdom of Bulgaria
- Died: 29 April 1987 (aged 83); Sofia, Bulgaria
- Allegiance: Kingdom of Bulgaria; Soviet Union; People's Republic of Bulgaria
- Branch: Air Force
- Rank: Colonel general
- Battles / wars: Spanish Civil War; World War II; Eastern Front
- Awards: Hero of Soviet Union; Hero of the People's Republic of Bulgaria; Order of Lenin; Order of Georgi Dimitrov; Order of Friendship of Peoples

Zachari Simeonov Zachariev (1904–1987) was a Bulgarian military pilot and commander, who served in the Red Army from 1929 to 1944 and reached the rank of colonel general. He fought in the Spanish Civil War on the Republican side as a fighter pilot of the Soviet volunteer aviation group. For his combat feats he was awarded the title of Hero of the Soviet Union - the highest distinction in the Soviet Union. During WWII Zachariev served as head of training facilities of the Civil Air Fleet, where he trained more than 12 thousand pilots. In 1944 he returned to Bulgaria, where he became the Commander-in-Chief of the Bulgarian Air Force, and later the deputy of Minister of Defence.

== Biography ==
Zachari Zachariev was born on 6 February 1904 (other source claims 4 February), the son of Simeon Antonov Zachariev (1873–1969), a village teacher in Basarbovo, Bulgaria.

He served in the Bulgarian military. In 1928 he graduated from flight school in Bozhurishte and became a pilot of 1st Reconnaissance Aviation Unit. In 1931 poruchik Zachariev was discharged from the army because of his antifascist views (he organized a strike on May 1), and he and with his friends - pilots Kiril Kirilov, Boris Ganev and Nikola Vatov - emigrated to the USSR. They were sent on the recommendation of Georgi Dimitrov to flight training into the Tambov flight school, where Zachariev soon became an instructor, changing his name to Volkan Goranov to prevent the pro-fascist government of Bulgaria from persecuting his family.

In 1936 three Bulgarian instructors of the Tambov flight school wrote reports with a request to enter a volunteer aviation unit, which was to be deployed to Spain.

In Spain Zachariev fought under the Turkish pseudonym Halil Ekrem, flying a Potez-542 bomber, later a SB, carrying airstrikes against Francoist targets. He injured his leg, when his airplane was attacked by Italian fighters and set on fire. Despite his wound, he saved his crew.

When the nationalists started their attack on Madrid, he was evacuated from a Spanish hospital to the USSR on board of a Soviet ship. Soon he was awarded the title of Hero of Soviet Union and appointed as head of Tambov flight school. During the Great Patriotic War Zachariev was appointed the head of the Civil Air Fleet training facilities, where he trained personnel for the army. He was a deputy of the Supreme Soviet of the Soviet Union.

In September 1944 the government of the Fatherland Front took power in Bulgaria, and Zachariev returned to his home country and under his real name to rebuild the Bulgarian Air Force. In 1945 he became deputy Commander-in-Chief of the Bulgarian Air Force. In 1947–1955 he was Commander-in-Chief of the Bulgarian Air Force and deputy Minister of Defence of the People's Republic of Bulgaria. In 1947 he became major general and, in 1951, lieutenant general.

He supervised the process of transfer of Bulgarian aviation to jet aircraft. In 1959 Zachariev was appointed the military attaché in Moscow. After 1965 he again became the deputy Minister of Defence of People's Republic of Bulgaria. In 1973 he retired.

After retirement, Zachariev worked in Sofia in the Committee of Soviet-Bulgarian friendship and as chairman of veterans' council of Bulgarian Air Force.

== Awards ==
- On 31 December 1936 Volkan Goranov was awarded the title of Hero of Soviet Union (he became the first foreigner to receive this title) and Order of Lenin, and later the Gold Star No.22.
- In March 1974 Zachariev was awarded the Order of Friendship of Peoples.
- In 1974 Zachariev was awarded the title of Hero of the People's Republic of Bulgaria.
- The title of the Honoured Pilot of the People's Republic of Bulgaria (the first person to hold it).

== Memory ==
A memorial plaque was installed in Basarbovo, his place of birth, in 2015.

== Works ==
- memoir My Life in Aviation
