= Krum Vassilev =

Bulgarian politician, author, and journalist (1925–2020)

Krum Vassilev Крум Василев
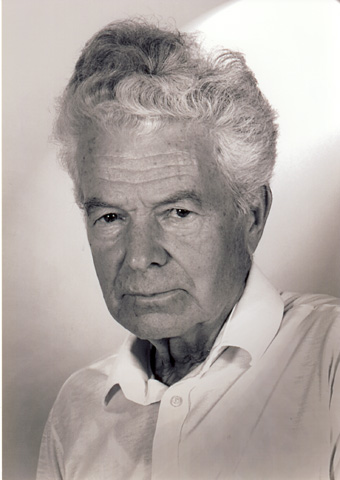

Personal details
- Born: April 14, 1925 Shumen, Kingdom of Bulgaria
- Died: October 10, 2020 (aged 95) Sofia, Bulgaria
- Political party: Bulgarian Communist Party (1944–1989); Bulgarian Socialist Party (1990–2020)
- Profession: Politician, author, journalist

Krum Vassilev Nachev (Bulgarian: Крум Василев Начев) (April 14, 1925 – October 10, 2020) was a Bulgarian politician, author, journalist and leading member of the Bulgarian Communist Party.

== Biography ==
Born in the town of Shumen, Krum Vassilev became a member of the Workers Youth League in 1942, served as regional secretary and later a member of its Central Committee.

Still a teenager, he joined the resistance movement, first as a helper (yatak) and since April 1944 as a fully fledged partisan (partizanin) in the "Avgust Popov" unit. Later that year he became a member of the Bulgarian Communist Party.

After the events of September 9, 1944 he studied philosophy at Sofia University and also graduated from the Higher Party School. Between 1950 and 1959 he served as chief political advisor to Secretary General and Prime Minister Valko Chervenkov, accompanying him on numerous state visits including the first official Bulgarian delegation to the People's Republic of China and the signing of the Warsaw Pact in 1955. Afterwards he was deputy chief editor and editor-in-chief of "Narodna Kultura" weekly and served as deputy chairman of the Union of Bulgarian Journalists.

In 1971 Vassilev became a member of the Central Committee of the Bulgarian Communist Party, having become a member-candidate at the previous party congress in 1966. He held numerous high-ranking positions in the state and party nomenklatura, including as director general of the Bulgarian National Radio and Television, head of the departments of Arts and Culture (1966–1968), Propaganda and Agitation (1968–1972) and Trans-border Propaganda (1981–1990) at the Central Committee, chairman of the State Printing Committee at the Council of Ministers (1972–1981).

He was elected a member of parliament between 1971 and 1990, serving four consecutive terms in the 6th, 7th, 8th and 9th National Assemblies.

After his retirement from politics, Krum Vassilev remained a member of the Bulgarian Socialist Party, an occasional columnist and published several books.

== Honours and awards ==
- Order of Georgi Dimitrov
- Order "13 Centuries of Bulgaria"
- Order of Saints Cyril and Methodius
- Order of 9 September 1944
- State Merit of Culture
- Nikolay Haytov National Literary Award (2010)
- Georgi Kirkov Publicist Award (2016)
- Georgi Dimitrov Award (2018)
- Dimitar Blagoev Award (2020)

== Bibliography ==
- "What We Saw in China" (1958)
- "No to Untruths" (2010; ISBN 978-954-8850-85-8)
- "Valko Chervenkov. Through the Eyes of His Contemporaries" (2010; ISBN 978-954-07-3157-5)
- "Impossible Conversations" (2015; ISBN 978-954-09-0926-4)
- "Yes to the Truth" (2016; ISBN 978-954-09-1067-3)
- "Earthly Stories" (2017; ISBN 978-954-09-1162-5)
- "Chasing Truths" (2019; ISBN 978-954-09-1342-1)
- "The Bullet That Spared Me" (2020; ISBN 978-954-09-1409-1)
