= Death and state funeral of Fakhruddin Ali Ahmed =

1977 funeral in India

Fakhruddin Ali Ahmed, the fifth President of India, died in office of heart failure on 11 February 1977, aged 71.

== Background and death ==
On 6 February 1977, Ahmed left India for state visits to Malaysia, the Philippines and Burma. On 6 February, he arrived in Kuala Lumpur, but after two days of engagements felt fatigued and was examined by his physician, following which he cancelled his engagements and the remainder of the trip. He returned to Delhi on 10 February, and the following morning at 6:00 suffered a heart attack in his bathroom at Rashtrapati Bhavan, being declared dead at 8:52.

== Funeral ==
Ahmed's body lay in state at Rashtrapati Bhavan until 10:00 on 13 February, after which it was taken to the Mughal Gardens adjoining the presidential residence for the Salat al-Janazah. After the prayer, Ahmed's body returned to Rashtrapati Bhavan until 14:15 when it was placed on a ceremonial gun carriage and taken in procession to the gravesite at the Jama Masjid. The funeral procession of vehicles, including acting President B. D. Jatti, Prime Minister Indira Gandhi, military units and foreign dignitaries, moved along Rajpath, Janpath, Connaught Place and Parliament Street before reaching Patel Chowk, with large numbers of mourners watching. From Patel Chowk, the procession continued along Ashoka Marg, Pt. Pant Marg and Talkatora Marg to the Parliament House complex. There, the acting President and the principal mourners left their vehicles to walk with the gun carriage past Transport Bhavan to the burial site.

Carried by military pallbearers and accompanied by the three armed service chiefs, Ahmed's body was carried to its gravesite and lowered into the grave with full state honours at around 16:30, accompanied by the Fatiha. The principal mourners and representatives of Islamic nations joined in throwing earth onto Ahmed's coffin as it was lowered into the grave. The funeral service concluded at 17:15, after a 21-gun salute was fired and the Last Post and Rouse were sounded.

== Dignitaries ==
26 countries sent representatives to Ahmed's state funeral:

=== Governmental representatives ===
| Country | Dignitary |
|---|---|
| Nepal | Tulsi Giri (Prime Minister) |
| Uzbek SSR/Soviet Union | Nazar Matkarimovich Matchonov (Chairman of the Presidium of the Supreme Soviet of the Uzbek SSR) |
| Soviet Union | Mikhail Porfir'yevich Georgadze (Secretary of the Presidium of the Supreme Soviet of the Soviet Union); Nikolay Firyubin (Deputy Foreign Minister) |
| Sri Lanka | T. B. Ilangaratne (Minister of Trade, Public Administration and Home Affairs) |
| Afghanistan | Muhammad Naim (Special Envoy) |
| Vietnam | Phan Hien (Deputy Foreign Minister) |
| Bahrain | Walid al-Dekhi Dir (Deputy Prime Minister's Office) |
| Bhutan | Princess Sonam Chhoden Wangchuck; Lyonpo Chhogyal (Finance Minister of Bhutan) |
| Pakistan | Habibullah Khan Marwat (Chairman of the Senate of Pakistan) |
| Japan | M. Okuda (Deputy Parliamentary Minister of Foreign Affairs) |
| Malaysia | Mohamed Yaacob (Minister of Public Enterprises) |
| Bangladesh | M. A. Rashid (Minister of Public Works and Urban Development) |
| Burma | U Hla Pona (Foreign Minister) |
| East Germany | Horst Sindermann (President of the People's Chamber) |
| United Kingdom | Elwyn Jones, Baron Elwyn-Jones (Lord High Chancellor of Great Britain) |
| Iran | Jafar Sharif-Emami (President of the Senate of Iran); Abbas Ali Khalatbari (Minister of Foreign Affairs) |
| South Korea | Pak Tongjin (Foreign Minister) |
| Yugoslavia | Cvijetin Mijatović (Member of the Presidency of Yugoslavia) |
| Bulgaria | Petur Tanchev (First Deputy Chairman of the State Council of Bulgaria) |
| United States | Adolph Dubs (Deputy Assistant Secretary of State); Charles H. Percy (Senator from Illinois); John Joseph Cavanaugh III (Congressman from the 2nd Congressional District of Nebraska) |
| Czechoslovakia | Karol Laco (Deputy Prime Minister) |
| Egypt | Aby Baker Ridwan (Deputy Prime Minister) |
| Hungary | Gabor Borbely (Member, Presidential Council) |
| Romania | Ștefan Péterfi (Vice President of the State Council of Romania) |
| Syria | Jamil Shayya (Deputy Prime Minister) |
| Oman | Qais al-Zawawi (Minister of State, Foreign Affairs) |
| Indonesia | Adam Malik (Minister of Foreign Affairs) |

=== Personal representatives ===
| Flag | Dignitary |
|---|---|
| Flag of Prince Michael | Prince Michael of Kent (representing Queen Elizabeth II) |
| United States | Lillian Carter (mother of President Jimmy Carter); James Earl "Chip" Carter (second son of President Jimmy Carter) |
