= Order "13 Centuries of Bulgaria" =

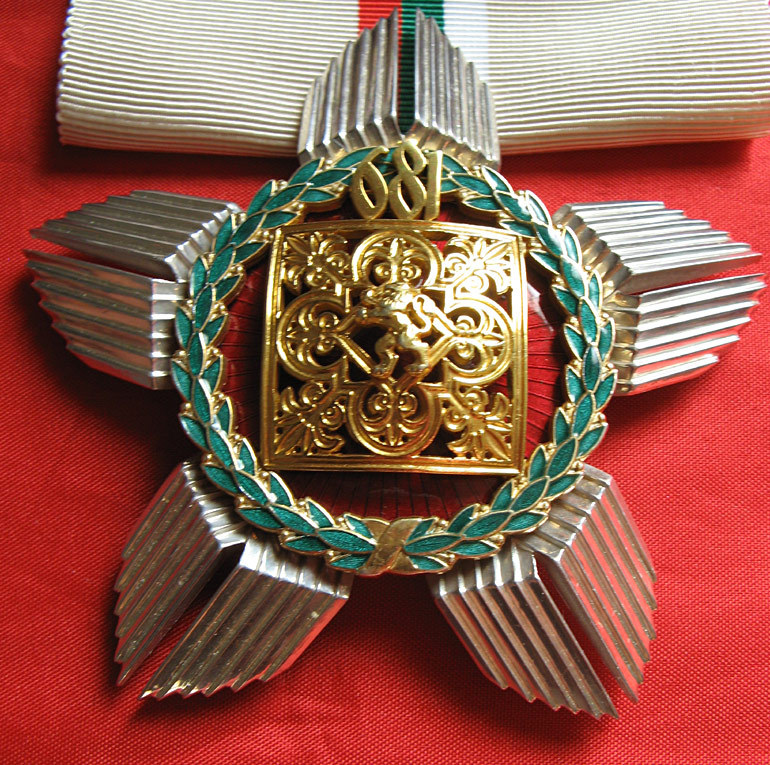
- Type: Order
- Awarded for: Outstanding services to People's Republic of Bulgaria
- Country: People's Republic of Bulgaria
- Presented by: the State Council of the People's Republic of Bulgaria
- Eligibility: Citizens of Bulgaria and foreign citizens
- Status: No longer awarded
- Established: 16 October 1981

Precedence
- Equivalent: Order of Georgi Dimitrov; Order of Stara Planina

The Order "13 Centuries of Bulgaria" (Bulgarian: Орден «XIII века България») was an award of the People's Republic of Bulgaria.

The order was instituted on October 16, 1981 by decree No.2191 of the State Council of the People's Republic of Bulgaria, to commemorate the 13-centuries anniversary of the Bulgarian state. It was awarded to Bulgarian and foreign citizens for outstanding services to People's Republic of Bulgaria. This could be services or legal entities in support of education, science, culture, restoration and preservation of historical and cultural values, health care and other social spheres.

== Description ==
The badge consists of a five-pointed star, 75mm in diameter. In the centre there is a square of gold, which depicts mediaeval frescoes from the Veliki Preslav Palace surrounded by green-enamelled olive branches. It bears the number 681, the year of the creation of the Bulgarian state. It is worn on a sash 85mm wide, beige/off-white with a white, green and red central stripe.

The star of the order is five-pointed, 80mm in diameter. In the centre there is a similar medallion to that on the badge. Awardees also receive a miniature star to wear as a lapel badge.

The insignia was designed by Professor Valentin Starchev and the artist M. Markov, and was made in the State Mint.

== Recipients ==
The order has been awarded about 100 times. Among the recipients are:

- Todor Zhivkov (1971, 1981), General Secretary of the Central Committee of the Communist Party (1954–1989)
- Grisha Filipov, Prime Minister of Bulgaria (1981–1986)
- Georgi Atanasov, Prime Minister of Bulgaria (1986–1990)
- Petur Tanchev- (politician, General secretary of the Bulgarian agriculture people's union (1974–1989), first Deputy chairman of the State council of Bulgaria (1974–1989)
- George Djagarov (poet, playwright and Vice-President of the State Council)
- Pencho Kubadinski (politician from PA)
- Georgi Yordanov (politician from PA)
- Dimitar Stanishev (politician from PA)
- Emil Hristov (politician from PA)
- Peter Dulgerov (politician from PA)
- Grigor Stoichkov (politician from PA)
- Alexi Ivanov (politician, Secretary of the standing committee of the Bulgarian agriculture people's union (1976–1989), Deputy chairman of the Council of Ministers (1986–1987) and Minister of Agriculture and Forestry (March 1986 – December 1988)
- Vasil Vasilev (politician from PA)
- Ivan Panev (politician from PA)
- Acad. Radoi Попиванов ( политик от БЗНС ( български учен - биолог, Министър of Public Health and the Minister of National Health and Welfare)
- Patriarch Maxim (1985) (patriarch Bulgarian and Metropolitan of Sofia)
- Souphanouvong (1989) (President of Laos)
- Bogomil Raynov (1989) (writer)
- Nicolai Ghiaurov (opera singer)
- Nicolas Strandzha (translator)
- Christina Stoeva (historian, publicist)
- Vera Mutafchieva (writer, historian)
