= Lăstuni =

Lăstuni may refer to two villages in Romania:

- Lăstuni, a village in Mihail Kogălniceanu Commune, Tulcea County
- Lăstuni, a village in Dumitrești Commune, Vrancea County
