= Hero of the People's Republic of Bulgaria =

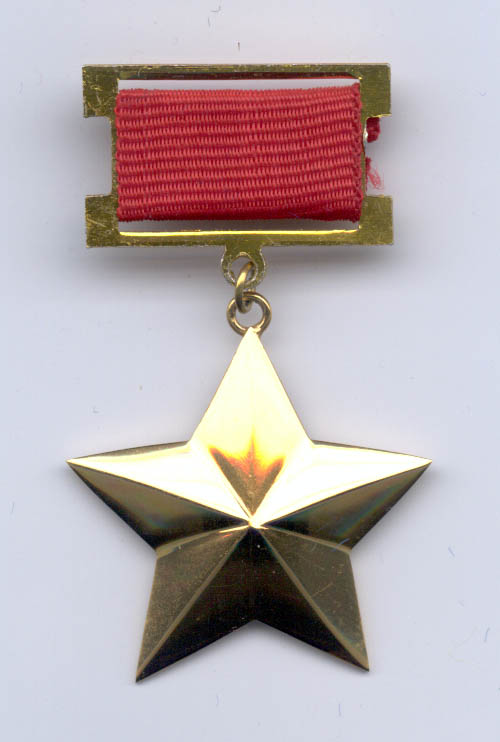
- Gold Star medal of the Hero of the People's Republic of Bulgaria
- Type: Honorary title
- Awarded for: Merits in defending Bulgaria and other countries allied to Bulgaria
- Country: People's Republic of Bulgaria
- Presented by: the State Council of the People's Republic of Bulgaria
- Eligibility: Bulgarian and allied citizens
- Status: No longer awarded
- Established: 15 June 1948
- Final award: 1990

Highlights
- Total: 58

Precedence
- Equivalent: Hero of Socialist Labour
- Next (lower): People's Honorary Title
- Related: Order of Georgi Dimitrov

The Hero of the People's Republic of Bulgaria (Bulgarian: Герой на Народна република България) was awarded to Bulgarian and foreign citizens for merits in defending Bulgaria and other countries allied to Bulgaria. Established on 15 June 1948, it was awarded until 1990. It was the highest honour of the People's Republic of Bulgaria. Individuals who were named Hero of the People's Republic of Bulgaria were also awarded the Order of Georgi Dimitrov, Bulgaria's highest award at the time.

== Notable recipients ==
- Nikita Khrushchev (Soviet Union) (Politician) 1964,
- General Ivan Mihajlov (Military/Politician) 6 March 1967,
- Tsola Dragoycheva (Bulgaria) (Politician) 1968,
- Todor Zhivkov (Bulgaria) (Politician) 1971 and 1981,
- Bojan Balgaranov (Bulgaria) (Politician) 1972,
- Leonid Brezhnev (Soviet Union) (Politician) 1973, 1976 and 1981,
- Zachari Zachariev Aka Goranov Semenovich (Soviet Union) / (Bulgaria) (Military) 1974.
- General Dobri Djurov (Bulgaria) (Military/Politician) 1976,
- Georgi Ivanov (Bulgaria) (Cosmonaut) 1979,
- Nikolai Rukavishnikov (Soviet Union) (Cosmonaut) 1979,
- Aleksei Yeliseyev (Soviet Union) (Cosmonaut) 1979,
- Marshal Of The Soviet Union Fyodor Tolbukhin (Military) 1981 (Posthumously),
- Elisaveta Bagriana (Bulgaria) (Poet) 1983,
- Hristo Prodanov (Bulgaria) (Mountaineer) 1984 (Posthumously),
- Aleksandar Panayotov Aleksandrov (Bulgaria) (Cosmonaut) 1988,
- Anatoly Solovyev (Soviet Union) (Cosmonaut) 1988,
- Viktor Savinykh (Soviet Union) (Cosmonaut) 1988,
- Anton Yugov (Bulgaria) (Politician) 1989,
- Georgi Traykov (Bulgaria) (Politician),
- Grisha Filipov (Bulgaria) (Politician),
- Karlo Lukanov (Bulgaria) (Politician),
- Peko Takov (Bulgaria) (Politician),
- Sava Ganovski (Bulgaria) (Politician).
- Yuri Andropov (Soviet Union) (politician)
- Venko Markovski (Bulgaria) (Poet)
