= Bozhil Nikolov =

Bulgarian lecturer, phonologist

Bozhil Nikolov (Bulgarian: Божил Николов; 9 January 1919 – 20 May 2014) was a lecturer, phonologist and the first dean of the Department of Classical and New Philologies at the Sofia University.

== Biography ==
After being awarded a Master's Degree in Romanian Philology in 1944, he initially began working as a teacher. Eventually, he was appointed as the first dean of the Department of Classical and New Philologies at Sofia University.

== Awards and distinctions ==
Nikolov was a two-time recipient of the Order of Saints Cyril and Methodius, First and Second Class (in 1968 and 1978).
