= Konstantin Katsarov =

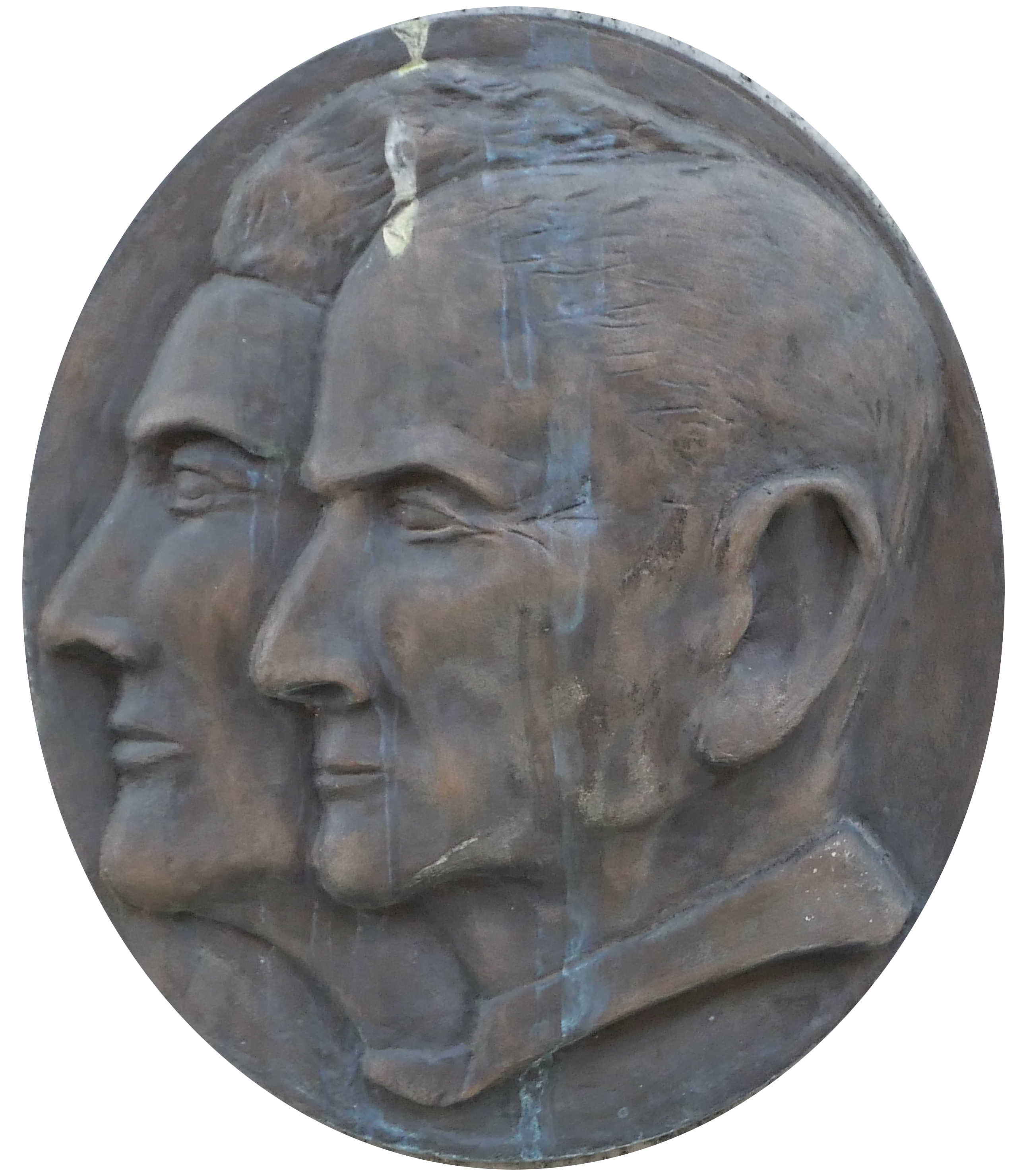
- Medallion of Katsarov (right) and his wife Zinovia (1897-1975) on their grave
- Website: https://www.fonds-katzarov.ch/

Konstantin Ivanov Katsarov (Константин Иванов Кацаров; 31 August 1898, Sofia - 7 October 1980, Montreux) was a Bulgarian lawyer and professor of commercial law and international law at Sofia University.

In 1953 he was sentenced in Communist Bulgaria to 15 years in prison for espionage. A rehabilitator from the Supreme Court of Bulgaria, he left his homeland and lived in exile in Switzerland until his death.

Konstantin Katsarov is the author of more than 10 works, including commercial law and patent law, but is best known for his major work, ″The Theory of Nationalisation″, which was published in French by the University of Paris in 1960.

In 2017, Katsarov was posthumously awarded the Order of Saints Cyril and Methodius. That same year, ″Theory of Nationalization″ was first translated into his native Bulgarian language.
