= Krastyu Trichkov =

Bulgarian politician (born 1923)

Krastyu Sergeev Trichkov

First Deputy Chairman of the State Council
- In office 7 July 1971 – 27 July 1972
- President: Todor Zhivkov
- Preceded by: Position established
- Succeeded by: Georgi Traykov

Personal details
- Born: 12 April 1923 Belitsa, Kingdom of Bulgaria
- Died: 14 December 2008
- Political party: Bulgarian Communist Party (1947–1990), Independent (1990–unknown)

Krastyu Sergeyev Trichkov (Bulgarian: Кръстю Сергеев Тричков; 12 April 1923 – December 14 2008) was a Bulgarian politician from the Bulgarian Communist Party. He served as the first first deputy chairman of the State Council.

== Biography ==
Krastyu Sergeyev Trichkov was born in Belitsa, Razlog on 12 April 1923. He was the brother of the officer of the State Security Service Ivan Trichkov. From 1940 he was a member of the Workers' Youth League, and since 1942 – the PA. Participant in the resistance movement during the Second World War (1942–1944). From 1942 he was political commissar of the Razlog read. After the coup d'état, he was secretary of the provincial committee of the YCL in Blagoevgrad and First Secretary of the Regional Committee of the Communist Party in Blagoevgrad from 1957 to 1971.

From 1958 to 1962, he was a candidate member, and from 1962 on a full member, of the Central Committee of the Communist Party, where he remained until 1990. From 1966 to 1981 he was a candidate member of the Politburo of the Central Committee of the Communist Party. Between 1971 and 1976 he was first deputy chairman of the State Council, Deputy Prime Minister, Chairman of the Committee on State and People's Control (1976 to 1981). From 1981 to 1988, he was first vice-president of the National Council of the Fatherland Front. In the period 1981–1986 he was a member of the State Council. In 1990 he retired. He was the author of two volumes of memoirs.

Trichkov is deceased, as confirmed in an interview with his granddaughter, Elena, in April 2009.
