= Aleksi Ivanov =

Bulgarian politician (1922 – 1997)

Aleksi Ivanov Vasilev
- Алекси Иванов Василев

Deputy Chairman of the Council of Ministers of Bulgaria
- In office 26 December 1986 – 19 August 1987
- Prime Minister: Georgi Atanasov
- Preceded by: Position established

Minister of Agriculture and Forestry
- In office 24 March 1986 – 19 December 1988
- Prime Minister: Georgi Atanasov
- Preceded by: Aleksander Petkov
- Succeeded by: Georgi Menov

Personal details
- Born: Alexe Ion Bădărău; 22 October 1922 Mihail Kogălniceanu, Tulcea, Kingdom of Romania
- Died: 9 June 1997 (aged 74) Sofia, Bulgaria
- Party: Bulgarian Agrarian People's Union

Military service
- Branch/service: Royal Romanian Army; Royal Bulgarian Army
- Battles/wars: World War Two

Aleksi Ivanov Vasilev (Bulgarian: Алекси Иванов Василев), born Alexe Ion Bădărău (October 22, 1922 – June 9, 1997) was a Bulgarian politician from the Bulgarian Agrarian People's Union who was Minister of Agriculture and Forestry in the government of Georgi Atanasov from March 24, 1986, until December 19, 1988, and Deputy Chairman of Council of Ministers.

== Early life ==
He was born in Mihail Kogălniceanu, Tulcea to a Romanian father and Bulgarian mother. He graduated from junior high school in his native village in Romania, then in 1936 - 1938 he was a worker in a factory for hemp and manila ropes in Tulcea. In 1939, he returned to his village.

== Military service and move to Bulgaria ==
In November 1940, he was called up for regular military service in the Romanian Army's 2nd Army Corps in Bucharest. That month, he and his family went to Bulgaria, where he unofficially changed his name to Alexi Ivanov.

In 1943-1945 he served regularly in the All-Army Truck Regiment of the Bulgarian Army in Sofia, where he participated in the air defense of capital during the Bombing of Sofia by the US Air force and the Royal Air Force. He took part with the regiment in which he served in the 1944 Bulgarian coup d'état. Immediately after the 9 September coup, he served in the Ministry of War and in February–May 1945 he participated in combat operations against Nazi Germany as part of the First Army.

== Communist era ==
He was the Deputy Chairman of Council of Ministers, Chairman of the Council for Agriculture and Forestry Economy and Minister of Agriculture and Forestry in the government of Georgi Atanasov from March 24, 1986, until December 19, 1988. He was also deputy chairman of the Bulgarian Agrarian National Union responsible for organizational, political and ideological issues from December 1, 1976, until December 2, 1989, and he closely followed the lead of the chairman of the Agrarian Union during communism in Bulgaria, Petar Tanchev.

He died on June 9, 1997, in Sofia.

== Crimes and accusations ==
After the democratic changes in Bulgaria in 1989 he was indicted and brought to justice:

- In 1991 in the case against the Permanent Presence of the Bulgarian Agrarian Union-Kazionen for complicity with the Bulgarian Communist Party in the Revival process.
- In 1991, for grants and armaments provided from the state budget to foreign fraternal parties that maintained ties with the Agrarian Union until 1989, in his capacity as Secretary of the Permanent Presence of the Agrarian Union until 1989.
- In 1993, in Case No. 3 for grants, weapons and military equipment provided to Third World countries.
- In 1993, for his responsibility for financing the Agrarian Union with funds from the state budget, known as Enlightenment "B", which were withdrawn by order of Alexi Ivanov, which the Prosecutor General's Office considers illegally used by the Agrarian Union.
