= List of first deputy chairmen of the State Council of Bulgaria =

The following is a list of first deputy chairmen of the State Council of Bulgaria.

In the 1971–1990 period, the chairmen of the State Council — Todor Zhivkov (1971–1989) and Petar Mladenov (1989–1990) — were the heads of state of Bulgaria. The first deputy chairmen of the State Council were deputy heads of state. The State Council was abolished on April 3, 1990.

First Deputy Chairman			Term of office			Political party	Chairman
#	Portrait	Name	Took office	Left office	Duration	Political party	Chairman
1		Krastyu Trichkov; Кръстю Тричков (1923–2008)	8 July 1971	27 July 1972	1 year, 19 days	Bulgarian Communist Party	Todor Zhivkov
2		Georgi Traykov; Георги Трайков (1898–1975)	27 July 1972	1 November 1974	2 years, 97 days	Bulgarian Agrarian National Union	Todor Zhivkov
3		Petur Tanchev; Петър Танчев (1920–1992)	1 November 1974	14 December 1989	15 years, 43 days	Bulgarian Agrarian National Union	Todor Zhivkov; Petar Mladenov
4		Angel Dimitrov; Ангел Димитров (1927–2005)	14 December 1989	3 April 1990	110 days	Bulgarian Agrarian National Union	Petar Mladenov

== See also ==
- Vice President of Bulgaria
