= Angel Dimitrov =

Bulgarian politician

Angel Dimitrov Angelov

4th First Deputy Chairman of the State Council
- In office 14 December 1989 – 3 April 1990
- President: Petar Mladenov
- Preceded by: Petur Tanchev
- Succeeded by: Position abolished Atanas Semerdzhiev as Vice Chairman (Vice President)

Personal details
- Born: 1 January 1927 Dve Mogili, Bulgaria
- Died: 8 October 2005 (aged 78) Sofia, Bulgaria
- Party: Bulgarian Agrarian National Union (1944–1990)

Angel Angelov Dimitrov (Bulgarian: Ангел Димитров Ангелов; 1 January 1927 – 8 October 2005) was a Bulgarian politician belonging to the Bulgarian Agrarian National Union (BANU). He served as Secretary of the Standing Committee of the Agrarian Union from December 1989 to March 1990. He was the last First Deputy Chairman of the State Council from 14 December 1989 until the State Council was disestablished on 3 April 1990.

== Biography ==
Angel Dimitrov was born on 1 January 1927 in the village of Mogilino, but later lived in the city of Rousse, where he graduated from high school. In 1950 he was elected secretary of the district leadership of the Bulgarian Agrarian National Union (BANU), and in 1951 was selected as regional correspondent. From 1952 to 1959 he served as Secretary of the District Executive Committee before going on to serve as the Chairman from 1959 to 1962.

In 1962 he was elected a member of parliament and placed in charge of "political education" of the BANU. Additionally, he served as Deputy Chairman of the Sofia City People's Council from 1964 till 1972. In 1981 he became a member of the State Council of the People's Republic of Bulgaria, while remaining active in the BANU. While on the State Council, he served as the head of International Relations for the BANU from 21 May 1986 to 2 December 1989. On 2 December 1989 he was elected Secretary of the BANU. Later that same month he was appointed First Deputy Chairman of the State Council of the People's Republic of Bulgaria.

While acting as the head of International Relations for BANU, Dimitrov was a member of the World Peace Council. He helped promote Bulgarian disarmament during the 1980s, as well as promoting the Balkans as a nuclear-free zone. This proposal helped bring the BANU international approval. Dimitrov did much to push this idea forward, meeting with Western politicians in Berlin, Helsinki, and Brussels. He was a steadfast supporter of détente. He also participated in numerous conferences between various agrarian parties and movements around the world, which he used as a platform to promote disarmament.

In 1990, Dimitrov took part in round table discussions on the end of the People's Republic, but the BANU delegation was forced to withdraw I February 1990 after being excluded from the new government of Andrey Lukanov in February 1990. This ended the 50-year coalition between the Bulgarian Communist Party and the BANU. At the 36th Congress of the Bulgarian National Agrarian Union in March 1990 the leadership of the BANU, including Dimitrov, filed resignation for failing to retain a seat at the National Round Table. At the end of that month, the National Round Table submitting an amendment to the Bulgarian Constitution that eliminated the State Council, replacing it with a single head of state. This was passed on 3 April 1990, replacing the State Council with a President and eliminating Dimitrov's position. The President of the State Council, Petar Mladenov became the President of the Republic.

Although he had resigned his formal leadership role, Dimitrov continued to be involved in the BANU, working to maintain party unity. He died on 8 October 2005.
