= Mihail Kogălniceanu, Tulcea =

Mihail Kogălniceanu
- Commune
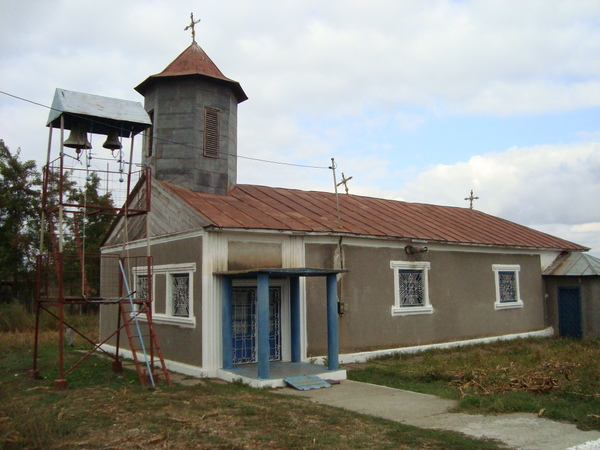
- Saints Cyril and Methodius Church

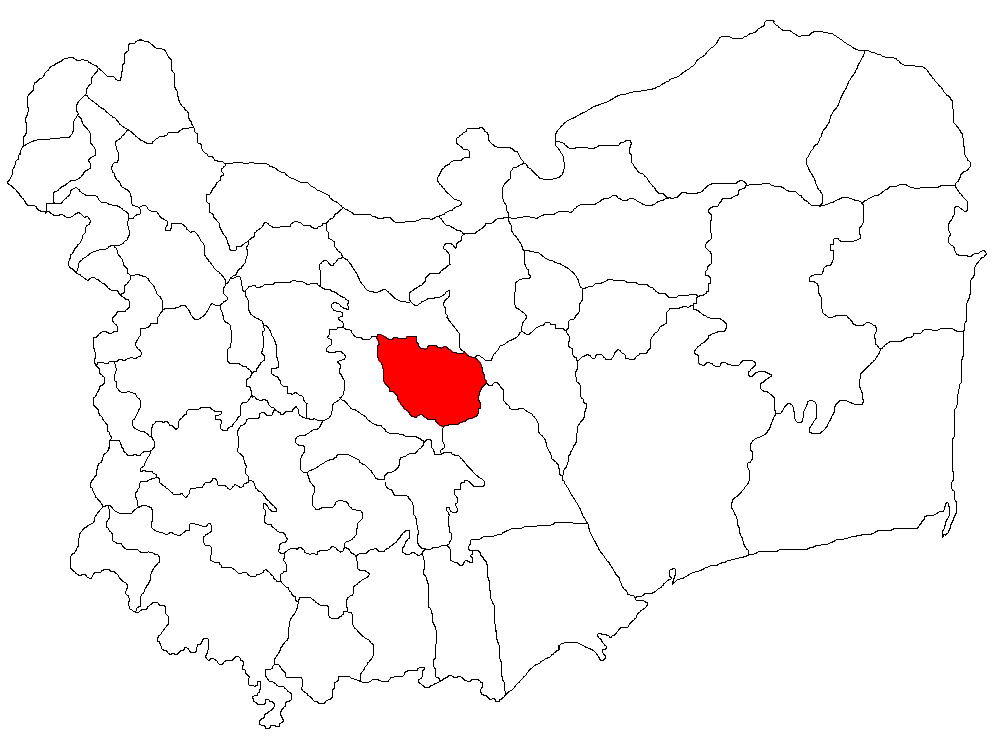
- Location in Tulcea County

- Location in Romania
- Coordinates: 45°02′N 28°44′E
- Country: Romania
- County: Tulcea
- Subdivisions: Lăstuni, Mihail Kogălniceanu, Rândunica

Government
  - Mayor (2020–2024): Anastase Alexe (PSD)
- Area: 140.16 km^{2} (54.12 sq mi)
- Elevation: 24 m (79 ft)
- Population (2021-12-01): 2,736
  - Density: 19.52/km^{2} (50.56/sq mi)
- Time zone: UTC+02:00 (EET)
  - Summer (DST): UTC+03:00 (EEST)
- Vehicle reg.: TL
- Website: www.primariakogalniceanu.ro

Mihail Kogălniceanu (Romanian pronunciation: [mihaˈil koɡəlniˈtʃe̯anu]) is a commune in Tulcea County, Northern Dobruja, Romania. It is composed of three villages: Lăstuni (formerly Hagilar), Mihail Kogălniceanu (formerly Enichioi), and Rândunica (formerly Kongaz or Congaz).

At the 2011 census, the population was 98.4% Romanian and 1.1% Roma. At the 1930 census, the ethnic composition was as follows. Congaz was 93.9% Bulgarian and 4.5% Romanian; Hagilar was 96.2% Bulgarian and 3.2% Romanian; Mihail Kogălniceanu was 67.8% Bulgarian and 31.2% Romanian.

The ethnic Bulgarian population was resettled to Bulgaria during the population exchange following the Treaty of Craiova. As a result of this population exchange, the commune gained a large Aromanian community that still exists today.
