= Georgi Atanasov (politician) =

Bulgarian politician (1933–2022)

- Георги Атанасов

39th Prime Minister of Bulgaria
- In office 21 March 1986 – 3 February 1990
- Preceded by: Grisha Filipov
- Succeeded by: Andrey Lukanov

Personal details
- Born: 25 July 1933 Pravoslaven, Bulgaria
- Died: 31 March 2022 (aged 88) Sofia, Bulgaria
- Party: Independent (1990–2022)
- Other political affiliations: Bulgarian Communist Party (1947–1990)
- Education: Sofia University

Georgi Ivanov Atanasov (Bulgarian: Георги Иванов Атанасов; 25 July 1933 – 31 March 2022) was a Bulgarian politician and a leading member of the Bulgarian Communist Party who served as Prime Minister from 1986 to 1990. Atanasov supported the move to oust Todor Zhivkov as Chairman of the State Council, joining Petar Mladenov in leading the opposition. In November 1992, he was sentenced to ten years imprisonment for embezzlement, although he was pardoned in 1994.

Atanasov died at 31 March 2022, at the age of 88 in Sofia.

== Biography ==
=== Early life, education, and career ===
Georgi Atanasov was born on 25 July 1933 in the village of Pravoslaven, in Borisovgrad Province, Bulgaria. He joined the communist Workers' Youth Union in 1947 and became a member of the Bulgarian Communist Party in 1956. That same year, he graduated with a degree in history from Sofia University "St. Kliment Ohridski".

During the following years, Atanasov held a number of positions within the nomenklatura of the Dimitrov Communist Youth Union. He served as its leader from 1965 to 1968. He subsequently joined the apparatus of the Central Committee of the BCP, where he headed the Science and Education Department from 1968 to 1976, the Records Department from 1976 to 1977, and later the Organizational Department.

=== Political career ===
Atanasov was a candidate member of the Central Committee of the BCP from 1962 to 1966 and a full member from 1966 until 1990. He also served as First Deputy Chairman of the State Planning Committee.

From 1977 to 1986, Atanasov was a Secretary of the Central Committee of the BCP, responsible for organizational affairs and the Organizational Department. In this capacity, he became one of the most powerful figures in the party hierarchy, second only to Todor Zhivkov. From 1981 to 1986, he also served as Deputy Chairman of the State Council and Chairman of the Committee for State and People's Control, with ministerial rank, in the government headed by Grisha Filipov.

In early 1985, Atanasov was a member of a special temporary commission of senior party officials established to coordinate the so-called "Revival Process", the state-sponsored campaign of forced assimilation directed primarily against Bulgaria's ethnic Turkish population.

In March 1986, Atanasov succeeded Grisha Filipov as Chairman of the Council of Ministers. Later that year, he formally headed the 78th Government of Bulgaria. He remained Prime Minister until 1990 and was elected to the Politburo of the Central Committee of the BCP in 1986.

Atanasov received several state awards, including the Order of Georgi Dimitrov and the Order "13 Centuries of Bulgaria".

=== Later years ===
In 1990, following the political changes in Bulgaria and the transformation of the BCP into the Bulgarian Socialist Party, Atanasov was removed from all party positions. In 1992, he was sentenced to ten years in prison for financial abuses. In 1994, President Zhelyu Zhelev granted him a pardon on health grounds.

Georgi Atanasov died on 31 March 2022, at the age of 88. Following the death of Todor Zhivkov on 5 August 1998, Atanasov had been the last surviving prime minister of Bulgaria to have served under the country's socialist regime before 1989. He was the second-longest-lived Prime Minister of Bulgaria, after Stoyan Danev.

== Honours and awards ==
- Order of Georgi Dimitrov (1983)
- Order "13 Centuries of Bulgaria" (1984)
- Order of the October Revolution (Soviet Union)
- Order of Klement Gottwald (Czechoslovak Socialist Republic)
- Order of Karl Marx
- Order of the Two Rivers (Iraq)

Political offices
Preceded by Grisha Filipov	Prime Minister of Bulgaria; 1986–1990	Succeeded by Andrey Lukanov
