= Georgi Traykov =

Bulgarian politician (1898–1975)

- Георги Трайков
- Traykov in 1923

Chairman of the Presidium of the National Assembly
- In office 23 April 1964 – 7 July 1971
- Preceded by: Dimitar Ganev
- Succeeded by: Todor Zhivkov (as Chairman of the State Council)

First Deputy Chairman of the State Council
- In office 27 July 1972 – 1 November 1974
- Preceded by: Krastyu Trichkov
- Succeeded by: Petur Tanchev

Chairperson of the National Assembly
- In office 7 July 1971 – 27 April 1972
- Preceded by: Sava Ganovski
- Succeeded by: Vladimir Bonev

Personal details
- Born: 14 April 1898; Varbeni, Manastir Vilayet, Ottoman Empire (today Itea, Greece)
- Died: 14 January 1975 (aged 76); Sofia, Bulgarian People's Republic
- Political party: Bulgarian Agrarian National Union
- Profession: Politician

Georgi Traykov Girovski, also known as Georgi Traykov (Bulgarian: Георги Трайков Гировски, 14 April 1898 – 14 January 1975), was a Bulgarian politician and the longtime leader of Bulgarian Agrarian National Union. Traykov became leader of the Agrarian Union in December 1947, a year after the Bulgarian Communist Party rose to power. He quickly dismissed officials not affiliated with the Bulgarian Communist Party, helping to make the party a loyal partner of the Communists.

On 23 April 1964 he became the nominal head of state and Chairman of the Presidium of the National Assembly of Bulgaria, following the death of Dimitar Ganev. He remained head of state until 7 July 1971, when the leader of the communist party, Todor Zhivkov, took that position as the Chairman of the State Council. Nearly a year later, In April 1972, Traykov also gave up his position as chairman of the national assembly. In July 1972 Traykov was appointed First Deputy Chairman of the State Council and held this post until November 1974.

Traykov won a Lenin Peace Prize in 1962. Traykov died on 14 January 1975, aged 76.

Political offices
Preceded by Dimitar Ganev	Chairman of the Presidium of the National Assembly; 23 April 1964 – 7 July 1971	Succeeded by Todor Zhivkov (as chairman of the State Council)
