= Order of Saints Cyril and Methodius =

Bulgarian order in one class

The Order of Saints Cyril and Methodius is an award conferred by the Republic of Bulgaria.

It has had three incarnations:

- first on 18 May 1909 by the Kingdom of Bulgaria (named Order of Saints Cyril and Methodius Equal-to-apostles);
- second on 13 December 1950 by the People's Republic of Bulgaria (but called the Order of Cyril and Methodius);
- finally on 29 May 2003 by the current Republic of Bulgaria.

== Royal order (1909) ==
Royal Order of Saints Cyril and Methodius Царски Орден на Кирил и Методий
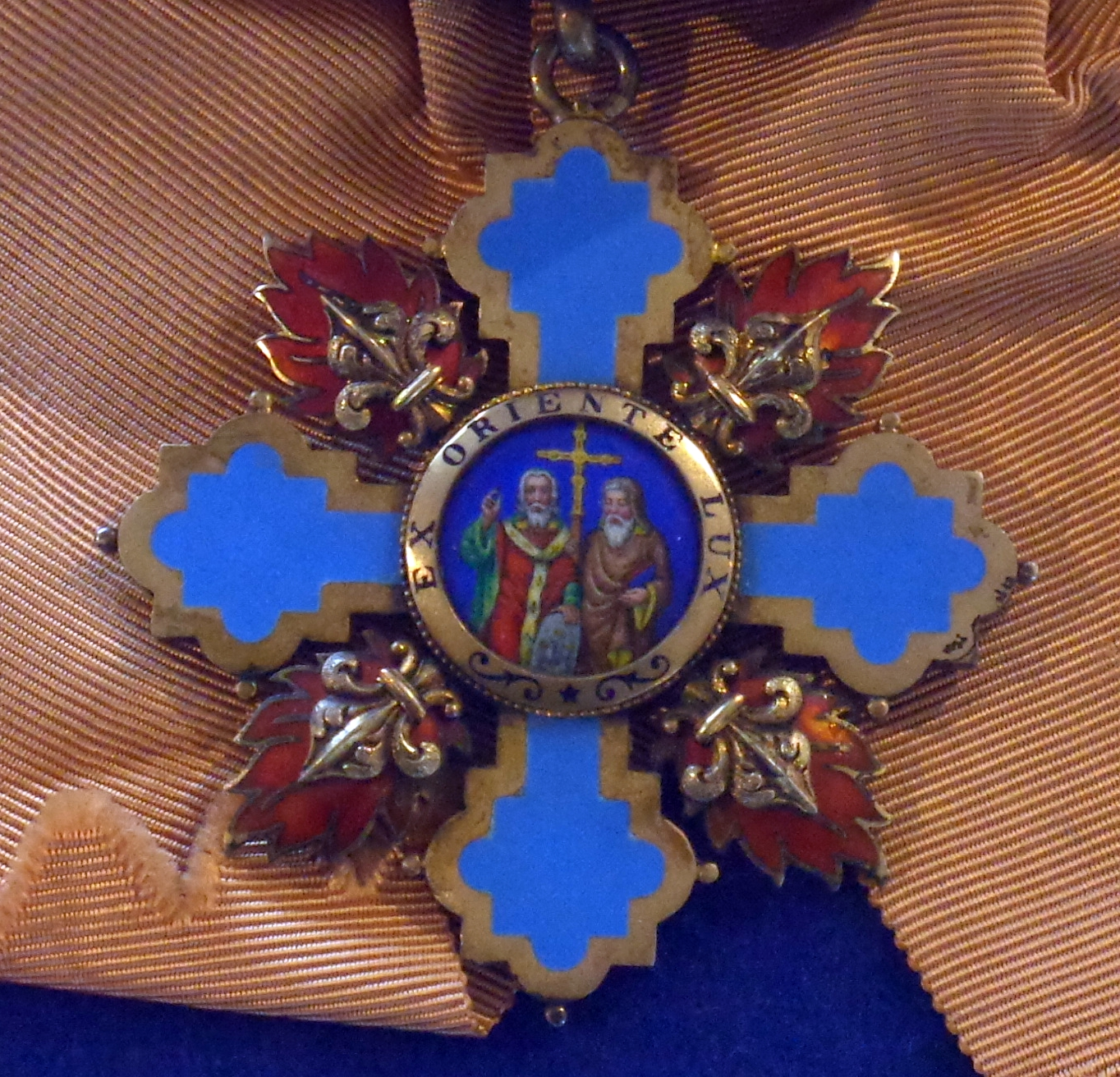
- The badge of the Order

Awarded by the King of the Bulgarians
- Type: Dynastic Order
- Royal house: House of Saxe-Coburg-Gotha-Koháry
- Religious affiliation: Bulgarian Orthodox
- Ribbon: Light orange
- Eligibility: Bulgarian monarch and heir Foreign heads of state
- Status: Currently constituted, rarely granted
- Grand Master: King Simeon II
- Grades: Knight

Precedence
- Next (higher): None (highest)
- Next (lower): Royal Order of Saint Alexander
- The ribbon of the Order

The Order was established on 18 May 1909 by Tsar Ferdinand I of Bulgaria (grandfather of former Tsar Simeon II), the first Grand Cross of this order to be awarded to the highest state officials.

It consisted of one class: Knight, represented by a collar, sash and breast-star.

=== Insignia ===
The collar of the members is gilded-silver and alternately shows a standing, crowned lion facing left and a fleur-de-lis.

The ribbon of the Order is pale orange.

The badge of the Order is a gilded Byzantine cross enameled in light blue. In the cross angles, green enameled beams are mounted, on each of which is a stylized lily. In the medallion resting figures of Saints Cyril and Methodius are seen standing side by side. The medallion is edged with a golden ring on the blue enameled inscription "EX ORIENTE LUX" (light coming from the east).

The breast star has the shape of a Maltese cross and is made of silver. In the cross angles blazing flames are seen with applied lily. In the centre of the cross is a representation of a seraph.

=== Royal House ===
Former King Simeon II of Bulgaria considers this version of the order to be his dynastic order and has worn it – from left shoulder to right hip – on official occasions such as the wedding of Victoria, Crown Princess of Sweden, and Daniel Westling.

== Order of Cyril and Methodius (1950) ==
Order of Cyril and Methodius
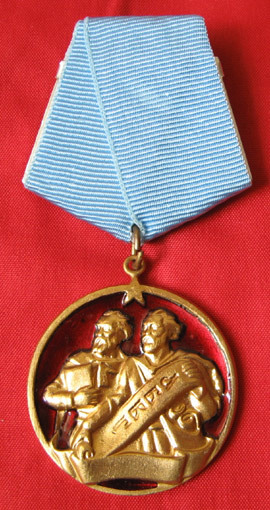
- 1st Class Order of Cyril and Methodius

Awarded by People's Republic of Bulgaria
- Type: Order
- Status: Obsolete
- Grades: Three
- The ribbon of the Order

The People's Republic of Bulgaria instituted the Order of Cyril and Methodius (the word Saints was dropped under the communist regime). It was awarded as an honour in the fields of science, culture, and art.

It consisted of three classes: First class, Second class and Third class.

=== Insignia ===
The prize is a round medal with red, blue or white enamel background. It shows the image of the Saints in relief. In the left side, Cyril, who holds a scroll with the first four letters of the Cyrillic alphabet in the hands. Slightly offset to the right behind Methodius with a Bible under his arm. One five-pointed star is seen on the top of the medal, hanging from a light-blue ribbon.

- First class: gold medal with red enamel.
- Second class: silver medal with blue enamel.
- Third class: silver medal with white enamel.

The medal is worn on the left chest.

== Republican order (2003) ==
Order of Saints Cyril and Methodius

Awarded by President of Bulgaria
- Type: Order
- Awarded for: merits in the fields of art, science, education and culture.
- Status: Currently constituted
- Grades: Three

Precedence
- Next (higher): Order of Stara Planina
- Next (lower): Order of Civil Merit; Order of Military Merit
- The ribbon of the Order

The Order of Saints Cyril and Methodius was reinstated on 29 May 2003 as the second order of the republic after the Order of Stara Planina and is awarded for merit in the fields of art, science, education and culture.

=== Grades ===
There are three grades: Collar, 1st Class (Officer) and 2nd Class (Knight).

=== Insignia ===
The order's insignia is inspired by the shape of the tsarist era:

- The medal of the first two grades is a silver-plated Byzantine cross with gilded-silver edges, the 3rd grade is only totally silver-plated.
  - The flames in the cross angle are no longer subject to a lily
  - On the reverse, instead of the crowned cipher names, the national colors of the country can be found.

The ribbon of the Order is orange.

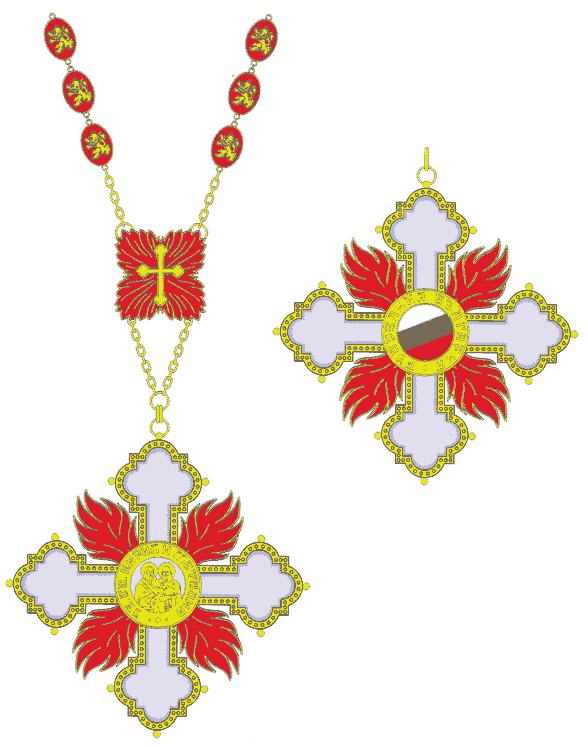
Collar

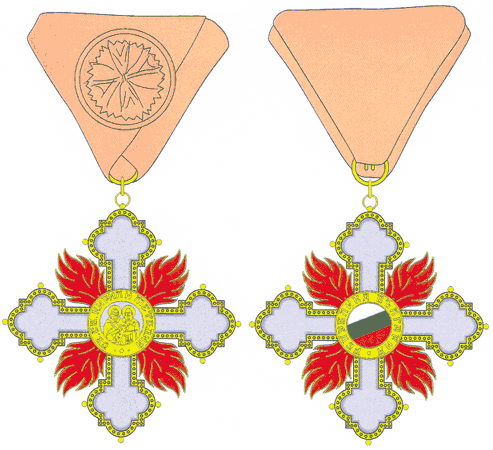
Officer

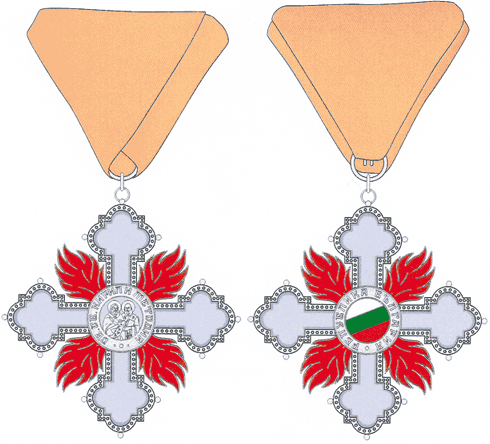
Knight

== See also ==
- Orders, decorations, and medals of Bulgaria
