= Grisha Filipov =

Georgi Filipov
- Георги Филипов

38th Prime Minister of Bulgaria
- In office 16 June 1981 – 21 March 1986
- Preceded by: Stanko Todorov
- Succeeded by: Georgi Atanasov

Personal details
- Born: 13 July 1919 Kadiivka, Ukrainian SSR
- Died: 2 November 1994 (aged 75) Sofia, Bulgaria
- Political party: Bulgarian Communist Party

Georgi (Grisha) Stanchev Filipov (Bulgarian: Георги (Гриша) Станчев Филипов) (July 13, 1919 – November 2, 1994) was a leading member of the Bulgarian Communist Party. He served as Prime Minister from 1981 to 1986.

== Biography ==
He lived and studied in Lovech. From 1938 to 1940 he was a student at Sofia University. He became a member of the Bulgarian Communist Party in 1940 and took an active part in the anti-fascist struggle of the Bulgarian students, for which he was arrested in 1942 and sentenced first to 12 and then to 15 years in prison. He became a member of the Central Committee of the BCP in 1966, and in 1974, a member of the Politburo. From 1971 to 1981 and from 1986 to 1989 he was a member of the State Council of Bulgaria. Filipov became recognised as a leading economic expert in the Bulgarian government and became associated with the tendency that was sympathetic towards economic liberalisation.

Filipov was very close to Todor Zhivkov and was regularly touted as a potential successor. A leading member of the Politburo, he formed the 77th Bulgarian government on 16 June 1981 following elections to the National Assembly. He held the post until 21 March 1986 when Zhivkov replaced him with Georgi Atanasov. The move, which took place against the backdrop of reforms being brought in by Mikhail Gorbachev, was characterised as a cosmetic gesture aimed to create the illusion of change rather than a Bulgarian version of glasnost and perestroika.

After the fall of the socialist system in 1989 he was removed from all political posts and on 24 April 1990 he was expelled from the BCP.

On 14 July 1992, Filipov was arrested on charges of misappropriation of state funds, but was released a short time later on health grounds. He died in 1994 before he could be brought to trial.

== Bibliography ==
- Tashev, T. Министрите на България 1879 - 1999 (Ministers in Bulgaria 1879 - 1999). Marin Drinov Academic Publishing House, 1999.
- Tsurakov, A. Енциклопедия Правителствата на България 1879 - 2005 (Encyclopedia of Bulgarian Ministers, 1879 - 2005). Petr Beron, 2005.

Political offices
Preceded by Stanko Todorov	Prime Minister of Bulgaria; 16 June 1981 - 21 March 1986	Succeeded by Georgi Atanasov
