= Petar Tanchev =

Bulgarian politician (1920–1992)

Petar Tanchev Zhelev
- Петър Танчев Желев

3rd First Deputy Chairman of the State Council
- In office 1 November 1974 – 14 December 1989
- President: Todor Zhivkov, Petar Mladenov
- Preceded by: Georgi Traykov
- Succeeded by: Angel Dimitrov

Personal details
- Born: 12 July 1920; Haskovo, Bulgaria
- Died: 21 July 1992 (aged 72); Sofia, Bulgaria
- Political party: Bulgarian Agrarian National Union (1935–1992),

Petar Tanchev Zhelev (Bulgarian: Петър Танчев Желев) (1920–1992) was a Bulgarian politician, Secretary (Chairman) of the Bulgarian Agrarian People's Union (BAP) from 1974 to 1989, and a deputy in the I (1950–1953), II (1954–1957), III (1958–1961), IV (1962–1965), V (1966–1971), VI (1971–1976), VII (1976–1981), VIII (1981–1986) and IX National Assemblies (1986–1990).

He was born in 1920 in a village near Haskovo. In 1935, he became a member of the left wing of the Bulgarian Agrarian Youth Union and in between 1940 and 1942, he was arrested for his political activity. In 1944, he graduated in law from Sofia University "St. Kliment Ohridski".

Following the 1944 coup d'état, the BAP became the central leadership and in 1974, he became the leader of the party. He acted as the Minister of Justice (1962–1966), and the first deputy prime minister (1971–1974). He also was the first deputy chairman of the State Council from 1974 to 1989.

In 1987, he received the Lenin Peace Prize from the Soviet government. Following his removal from the Secretary of Agrarian after changes made on 10 November 1989, he was replaced by Viktor Valkov. Viktor Valkov was elected by his deputies and the agricultural secretaries of PP Agrarian Aleksi Ivanov and Pando Vanchev following a similar plenum of the Board of the Agrarian Union of 2 December 1989. His election was part of an internal party coup led by the then International Secretary GOP Agrarian Angel Dimitrov and corresponded with the new leadership of the Communist Party and PRB led by Petar Mladenov and Andrey Lukanov.
