= Order of 9 September 1944 =

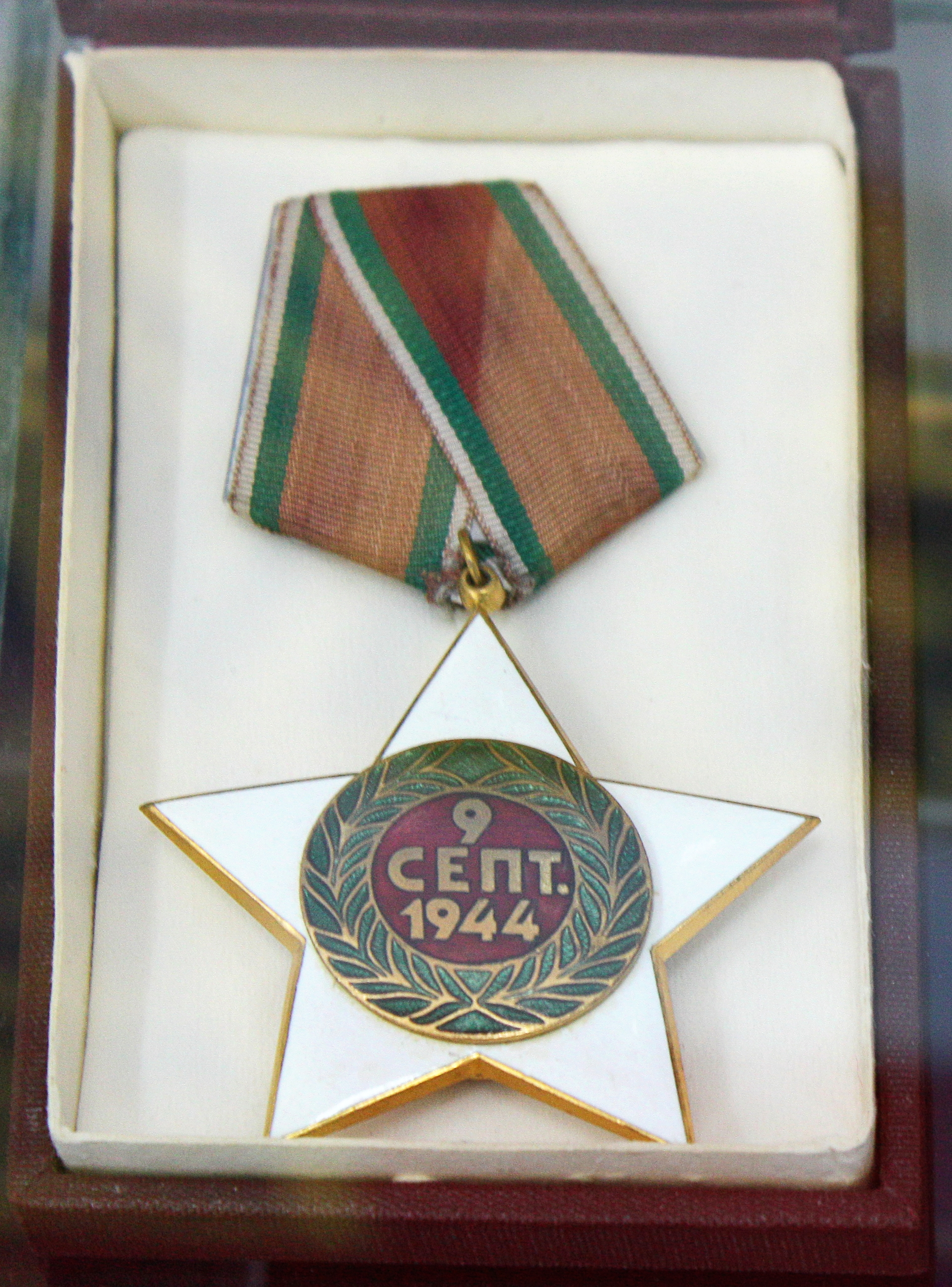
- Type: Order
- Awarded for: Services connected with the Army revolt of 9 September 1944 and the formation of the People's Republic, to civilians for service to the government and in wartime to officers and leaders of the People's Army for courage and leadership
- Presented by: The Bulgarian monarch (1944-1946), Peoples Republic of Bulgaria (1946-1990)
- Eligibility: Bulgarian and foreign citizens
- Status: obsolete since 1990
- Established: 14 September 1945

Precedence
- Next (higher): National Order of Labour
- Next (lower): Order of People's Freedom

The Order of 9 September 1944 was an Order of Merit of the Kingdom of Bulgaria from 1945 to 1946, and of the People's Republic of Bulgaria from 1946 to 1990. It commemorated the Bulgarian coup d'état of 1944, it came in three classes, had both a civil and military division and was awarded for services connected with the Army revolt of 9 September 1944 and the formation of the People's Republic, to civilians for service to the government and in wartime to officers and leaders of the People's Army for courage and leadership.
