= Order of Civil Merit (Bulgaria) =

Royal Order of Civil Merit Орден „За гражданска заслуга“
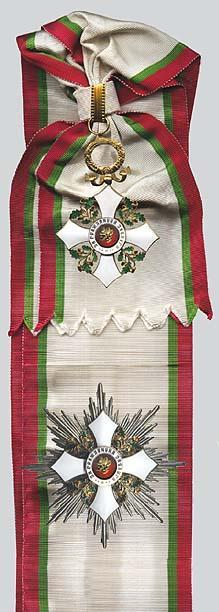
- Grand Cross set of the Order (1946)

Awarded by The King of the Bulgarians
- Type: Dynastic Order
- Royal house: House of Saxe-Coburg-Gotha-Koháry
- Religious affiliation: Bulgarian Orthodox
- Ribbon: White with a Green Stripe on either side and a Red Stripe on either Edge (Colours of the Flag of Bulgaria)
- Eligibility: Bulgarian and foreign citizens
- Awarded for: Awarded with the personal benevolence of the monarch
- Status: Unconstituted
- Grand Master: King Simeon II
- Grades: Knight/Dame Grand Cross; Knight/Dame Grand Officer; Knight/Dame Commander; Knight/Dame Officer; Knight/Dame; Medal

Precedence
- Next (higher): Royal Order of Bravery
- Next (lower): Royal Order of National Labour
- Equivalent: Royal Order of Military Merit
- The ribbon of the Order

The Order of Civil Merit was an Order of Merit of the Kingdom of Bulgaria. Established in 1891, it had six classes.

== History ==
The Bulgarian Order of Cvil Merit was established on either 2 or 14 August 1891 by then Prince Ferdinand, and was founded with six classes and a Grand Cross grade. The order lasted until formerly dissolved by the Communist government of Bulgaria in 1946. The order has been revived by the current Republic of Bulgaria and is awarded today.

== Grades of the Order ==
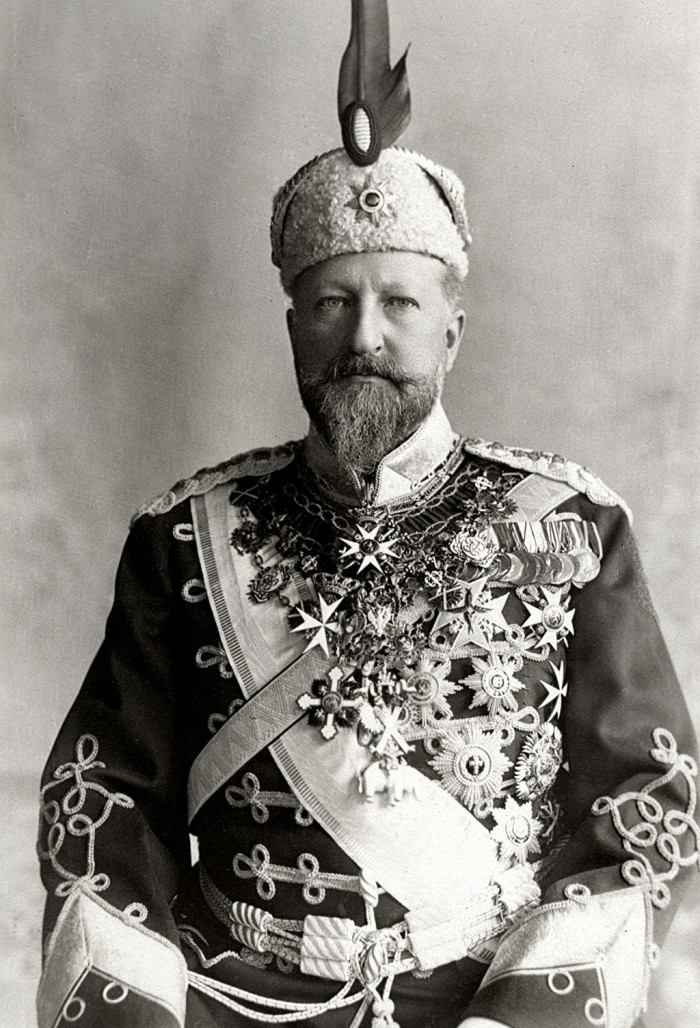
Tsar Ferdinand I of Bulgaria, the founder of the Order

- Grand Cross
- I Class – Great Cross
- II Class – Grand Officers cross
- III Class – Commanders cross
- IV Class – Officers cross
- V Class – Knights cross
- VI Class – Silver Cross

== Insignia and design ==
The Orders design was made up of a white-enamelled urdy cross, with a central disc bearing the royal monogram of Ferdinand I. The obverse disc is surrounded by a circlet with the inscription за Гражданско заслуги (For Civil Merit). On the reverse a lion turned to the right with the coat of arms of the princely house on it and the inscription 2. Август · 1891 (2 August 1891). Between the arms of the cross were placed green-enamelled oak leaves and branches, sometimes only enamelled on one side. Before 1908 the cross hung from a princely crown, but after Ferdinand was proclaimed Tsar in 1908 the cross was changed to the imperial Tsar's crown. This continued until 1946 and the abolition of the monarchy, where briefly the cross hung from an un-enamelled wreath until finally being dissolved by the communists in 1946. The Grand Cross and first class of the order consisted of the badge suspended from a sash with a star. The most obvious way to distinguish between the Grand Cross and the 1st Class is the sash. The sash of the Grand Cross includes a large rosette more commonly seen in other grand crosses, while the 1st class sash is simply tied around the badge placement in a less extravagant design. Apart from the sash the breast star of the Grand Cross is made up of gold and silver rays, while the first class is only in silver, though the shape, and size of the stars are identical. The Grand Officer's class consisted of the same badge, but suspended from a neck ribbon, while the star was smaller and also slightly different in design, taking on more of a diamond shape. The Commander was simply suspended from the neck like the Grand Officer, while the Officers and Knights crosses were suspended on a trifold ribbon and worn on the breast. The grades were distinguished by the addition of a rosette on the Officers cross ribbon. From 1908, the first three classes could also be presented with diamonds for exceptional merits.

== Recipients ==
- Arthur Zimmerman (1912)
- Pierce Charles de Lacy O'Mahony (1915)
- Kurt Klaudy (1938)
- Reuben Markham (1939)
- Herman Senkowsky (1941)
- August Beckman
- Konrad zu Hohenlohe-Schillingsfürst
- Johann Strauss (son)
- Viktor Urbanchich
- Ferdinand I of Bulgaria
- Boris III of Bulgaria
- Simeon II of Bulgaria
- Alexander Pietrov

Order of Civil Merit Орден за гражданска заслуга
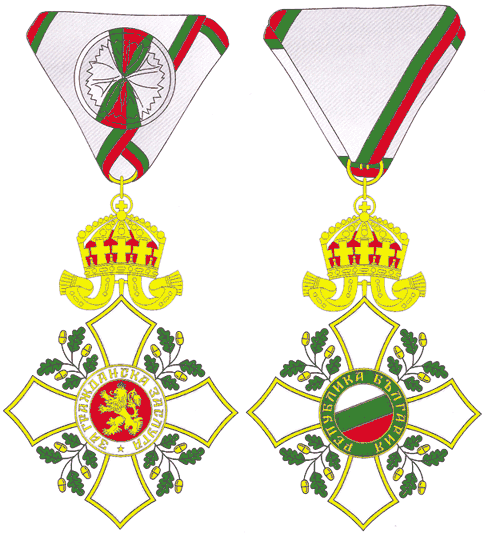
- The Commanders Medal of the Order

Awarded by The President of Bulgaria
- Type: State Order
- Religious affiliation: Bulgarian Orthodox
- Ribbon: White with a Green Stripe on either side and a Red Stripe on either Edge (Colours of the Flag of Bulgaria)
- Eligibility: Bulgarian citizens.
- Awarded for: Awarded for great merit to the development and consolidation of the civil society.
- Status: Currently awarded
- Grand Master: President Rumen Radev
- Grades: Commander; Officer

Precedence
- Next (higher): Order of Saints Cyril and Methodius
- Next (lower): Order of the Madara Horseman
- Equivalent: Order of Military Merit
- The ribbon of the Order

== Gallery ==
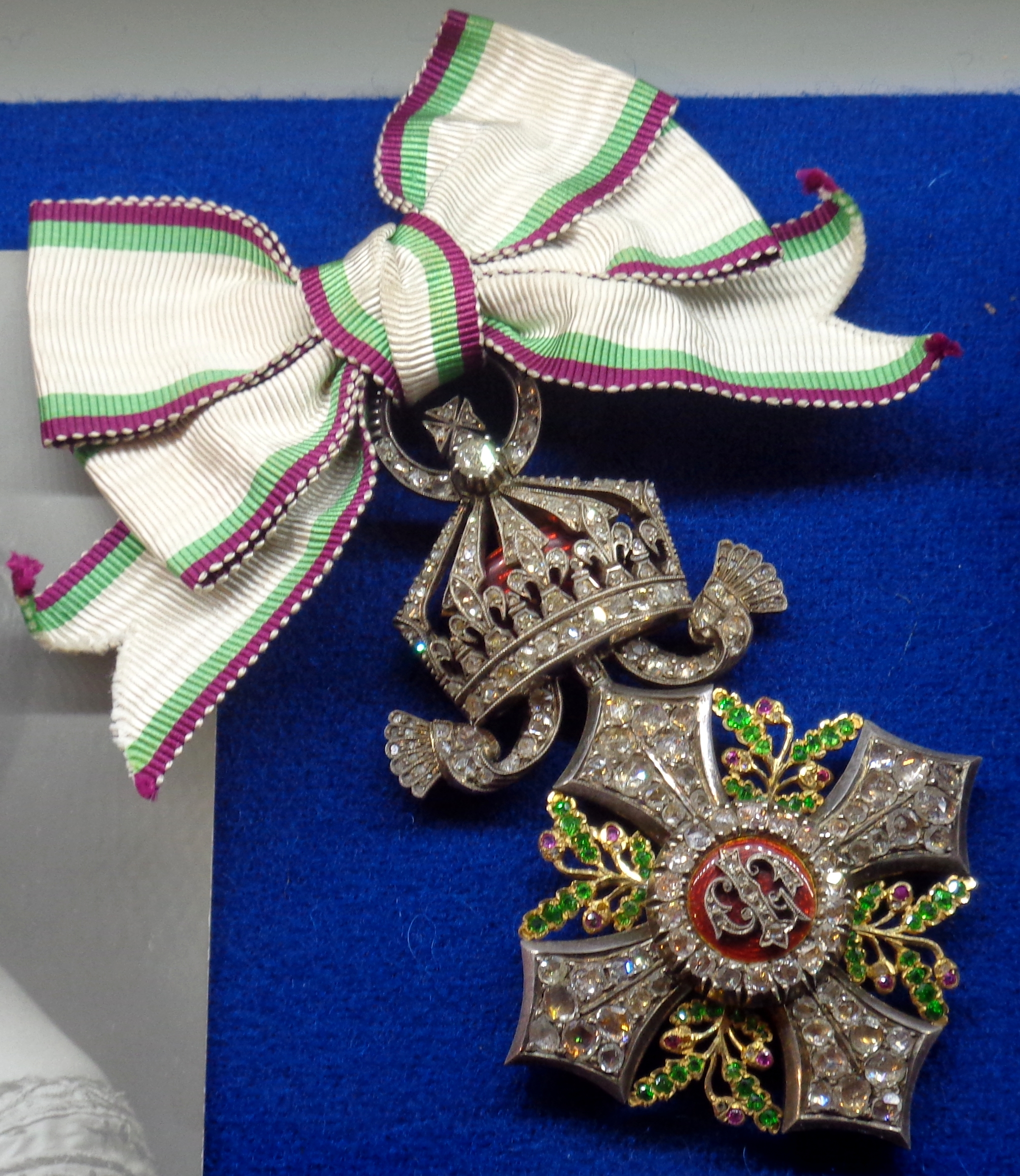
Order of Civil Merit in diamonds for ladies (Bulgaria before 1946) - Tallinn Museum of Orders

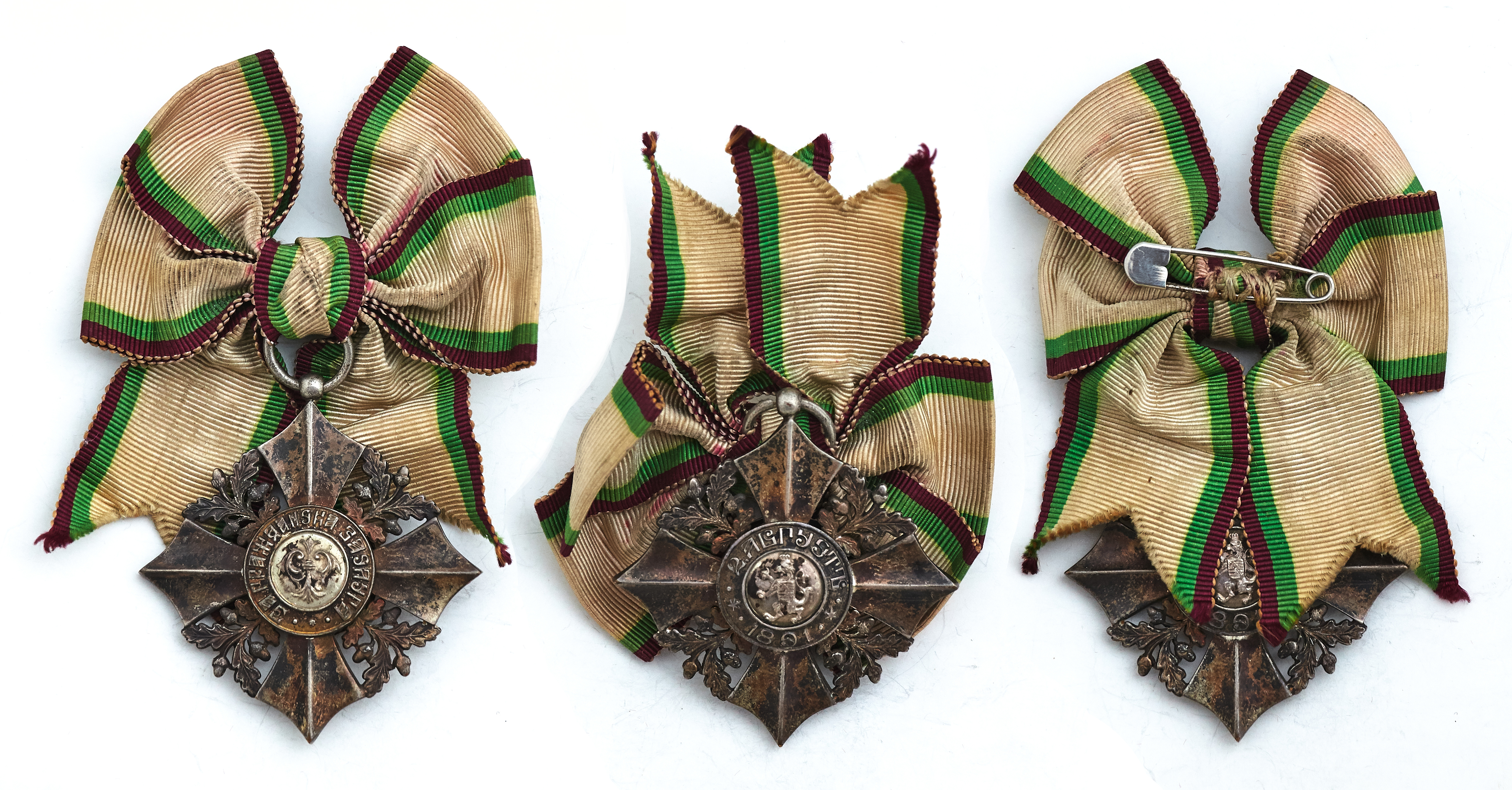
Order of Civil Merit Dame 5th Class for ladies (1946)

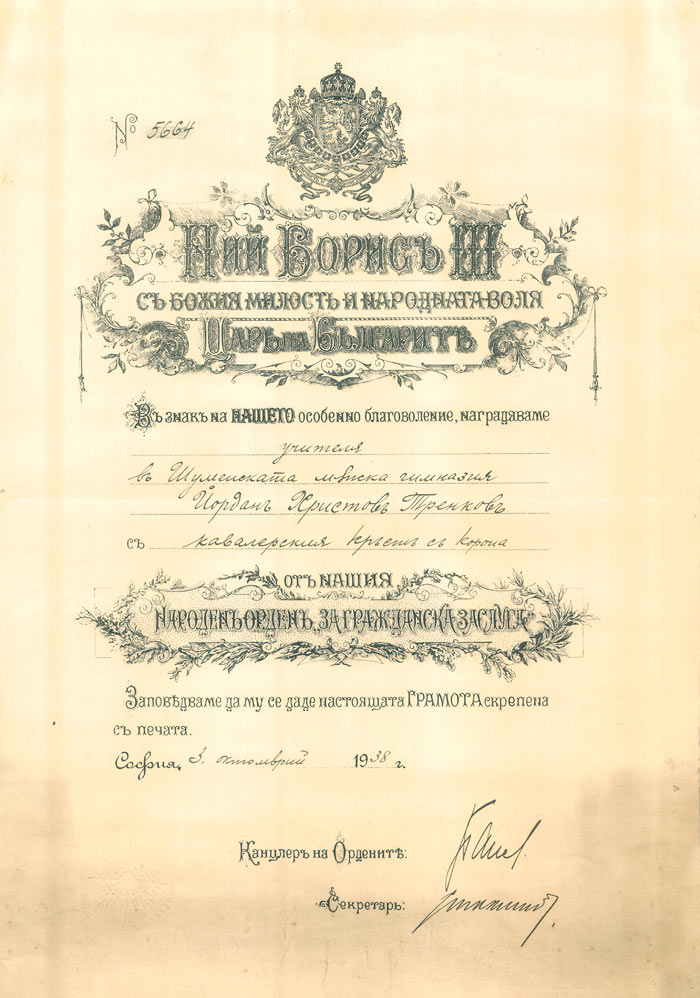
Bestowal document for the Order from the reign of Boris III.

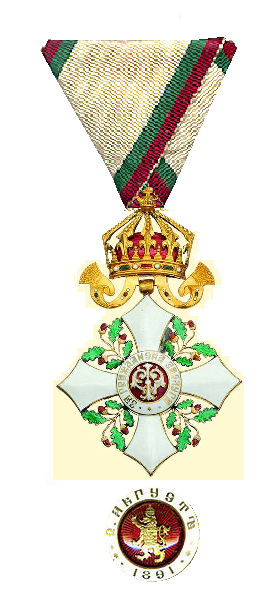
Knight 5th Class of the order.

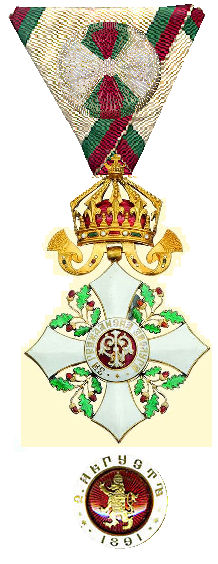
Officer 4th Class of the Order.

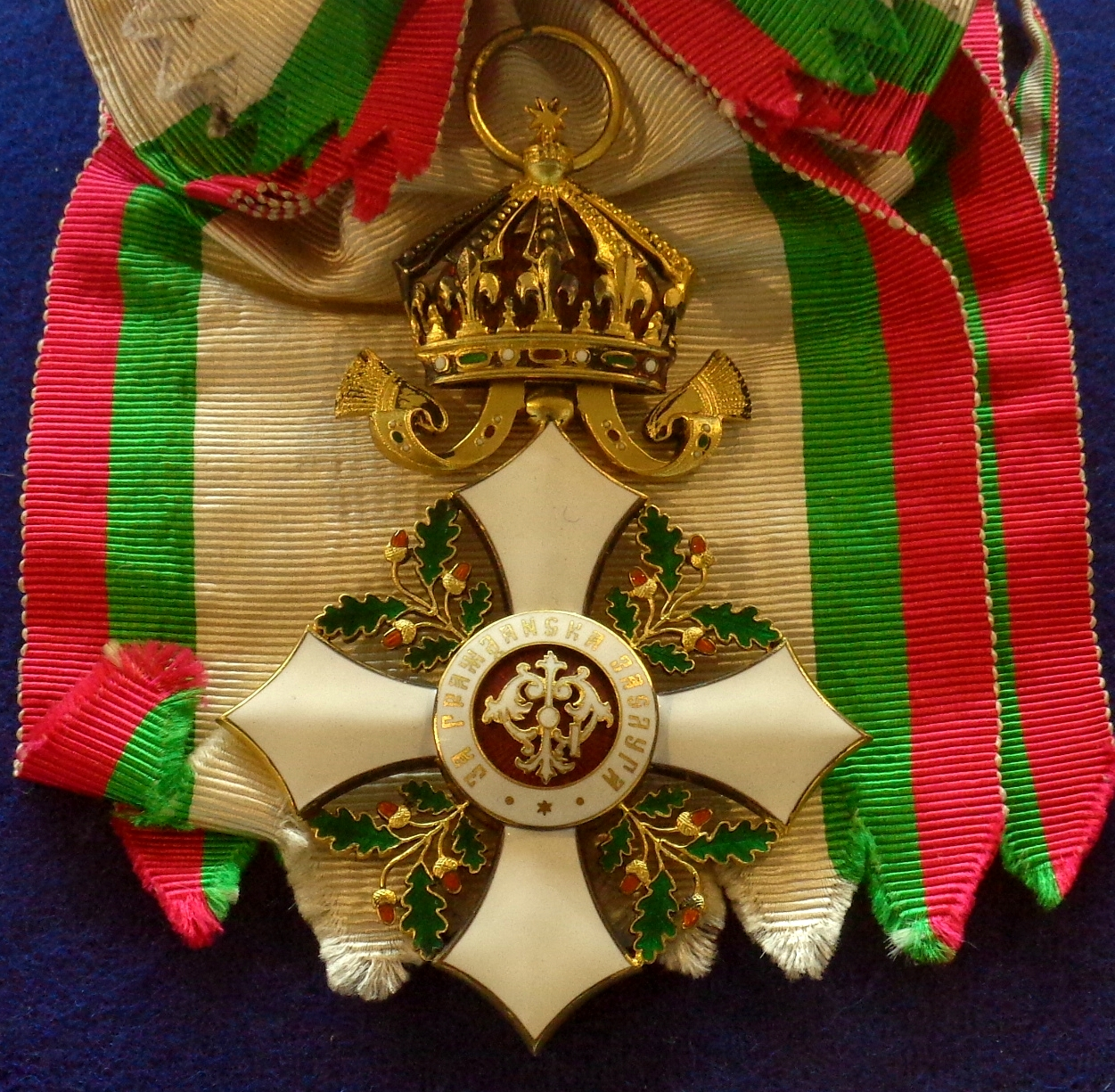
Order of Civil Merit Grand Cross badge and sash (Bulgaria before 1946) - Tallinn Museum of Orders

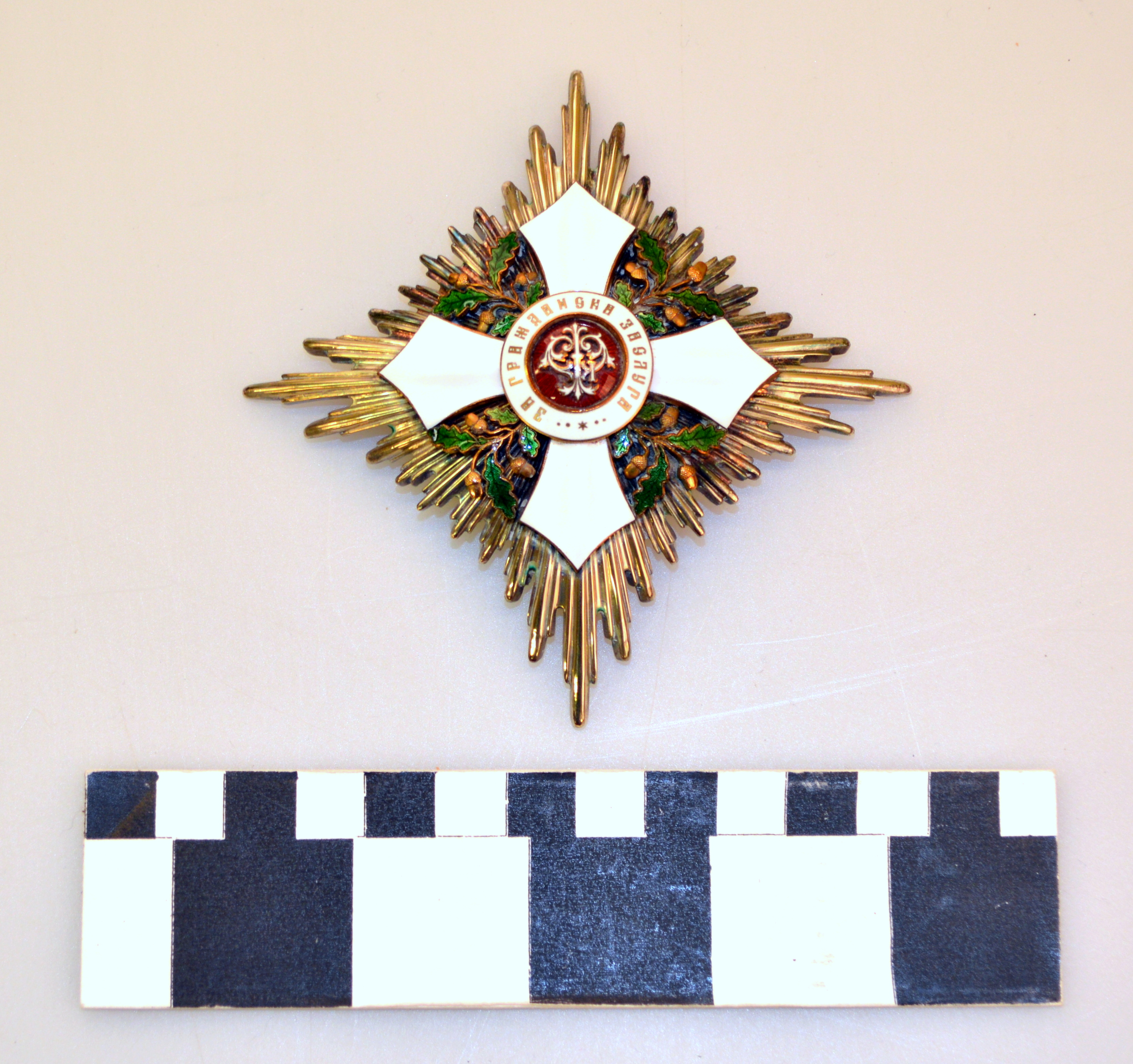
Grand Officer star.

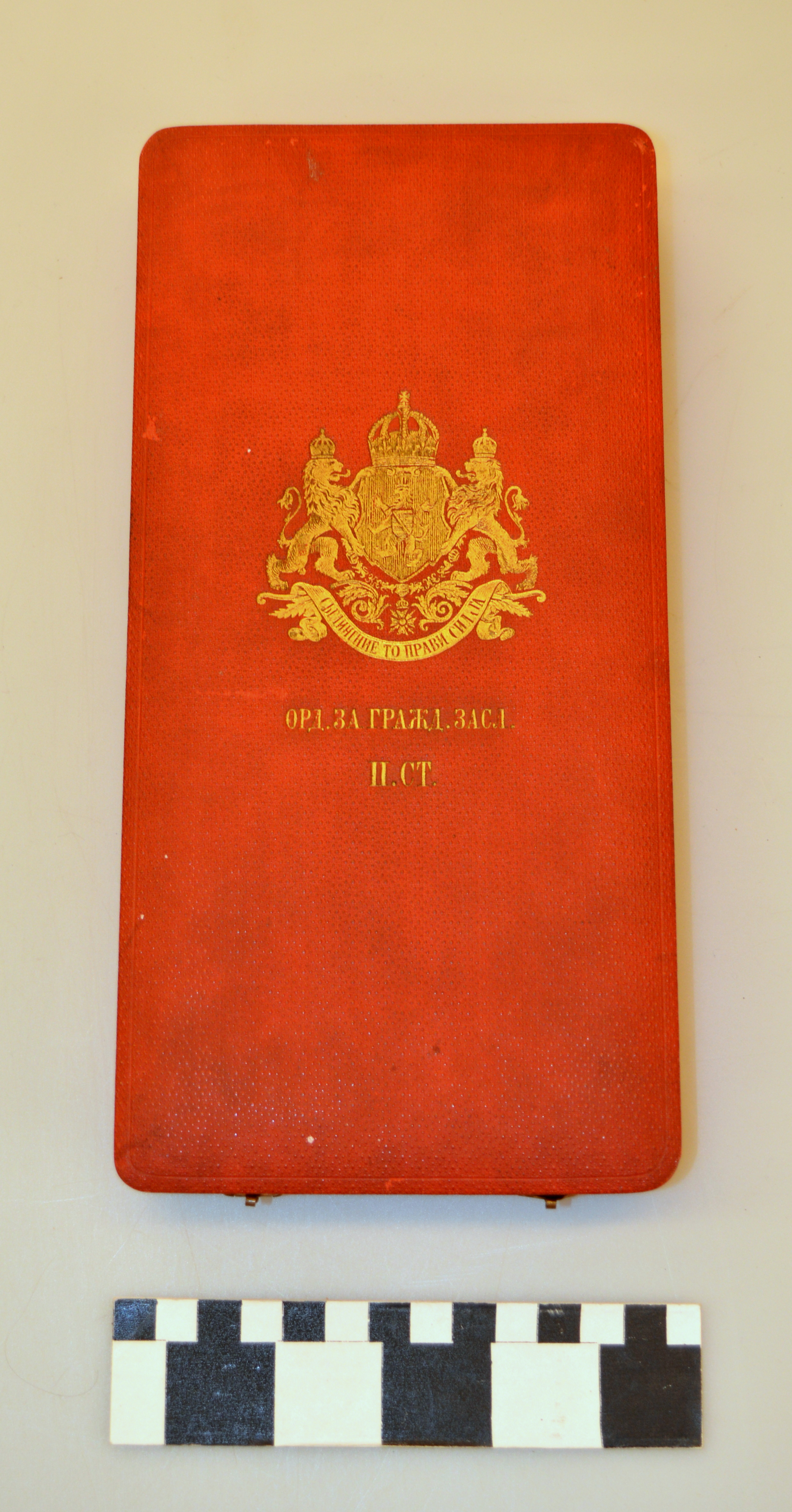
Grand Officer case.

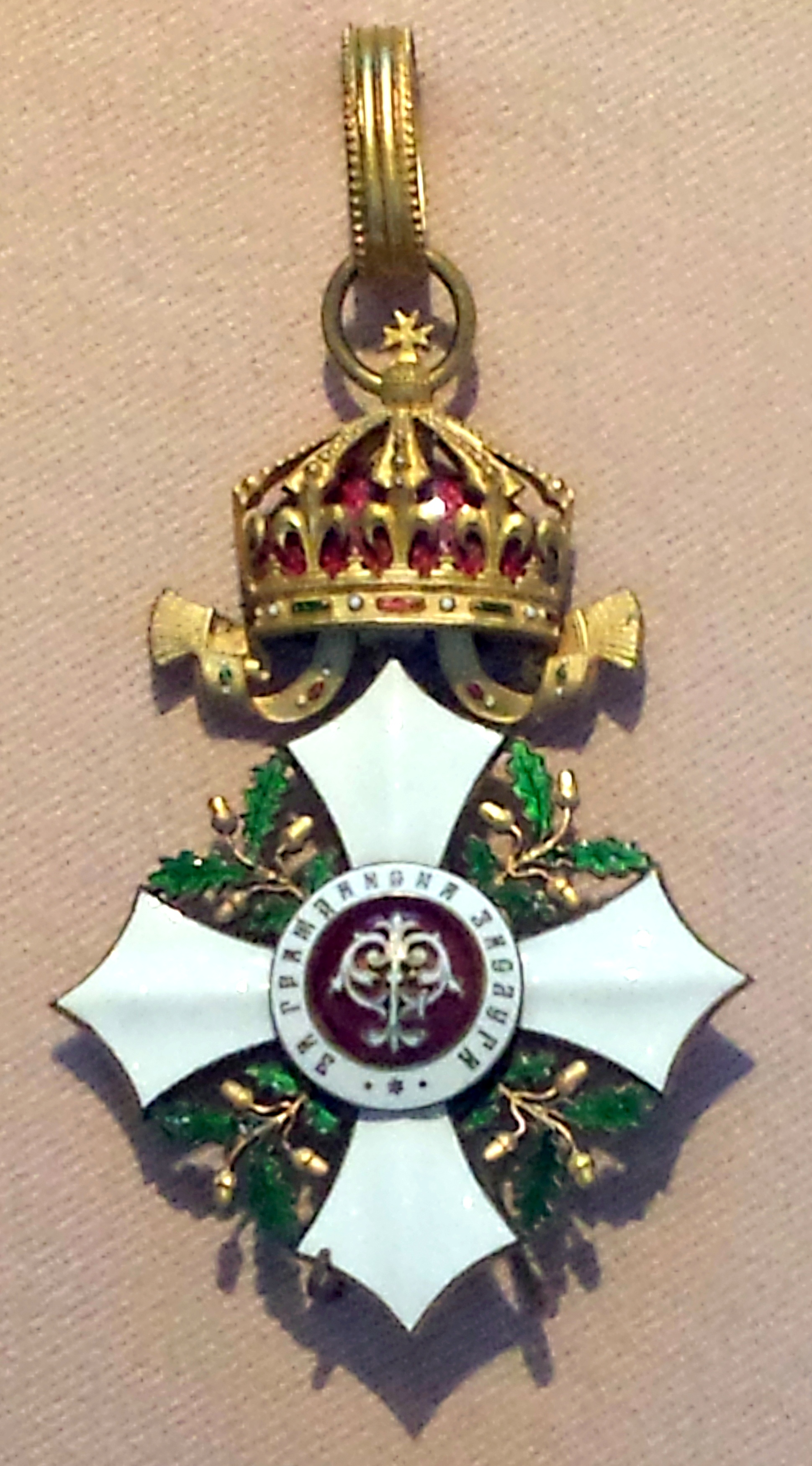
Grand Officer badge.

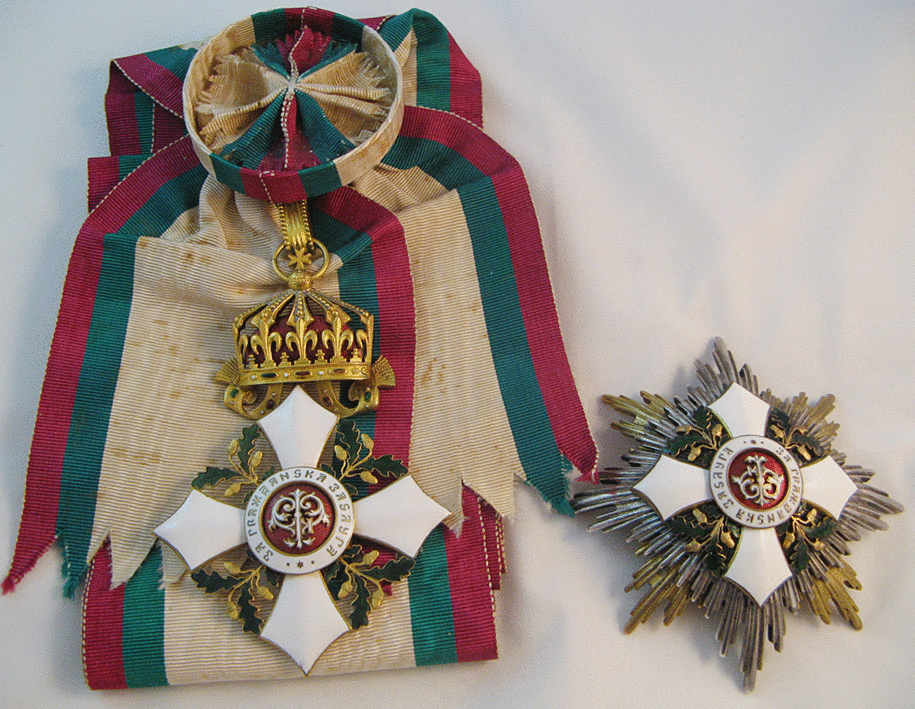
Set of the Grand Cross grade of the order (post 1908).

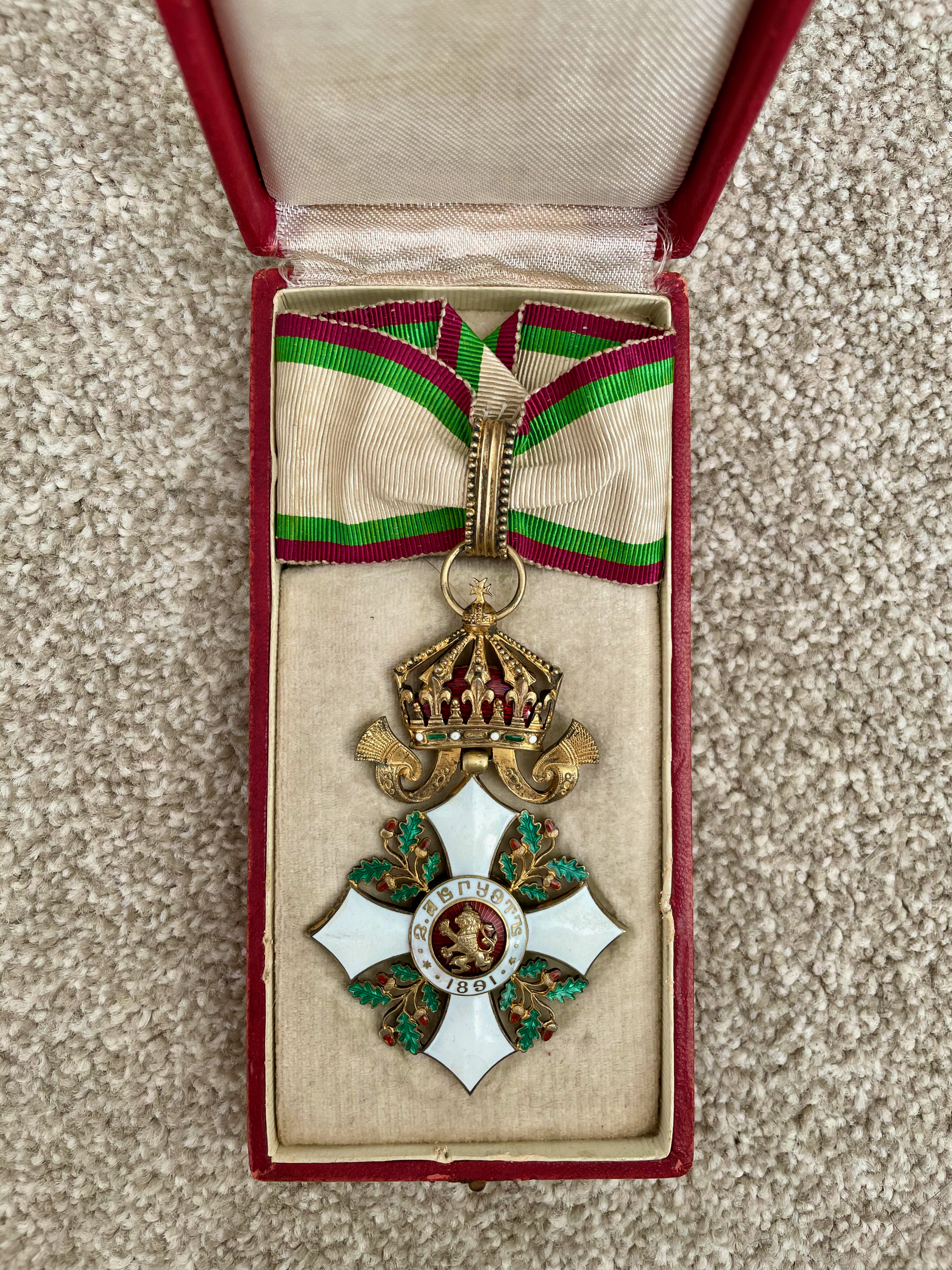
Commander reverse (1908-1944).

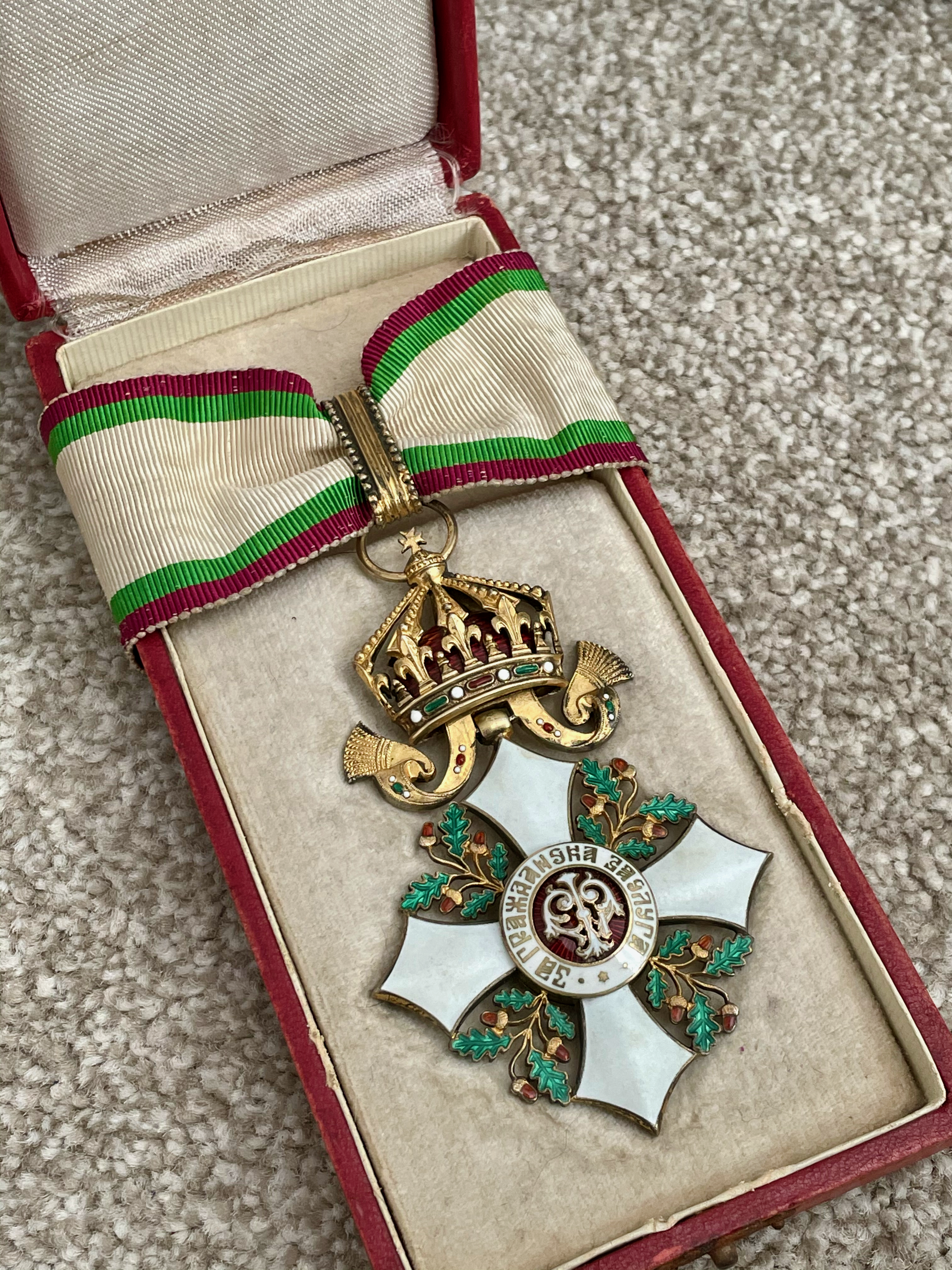
Commander (1908-1944).

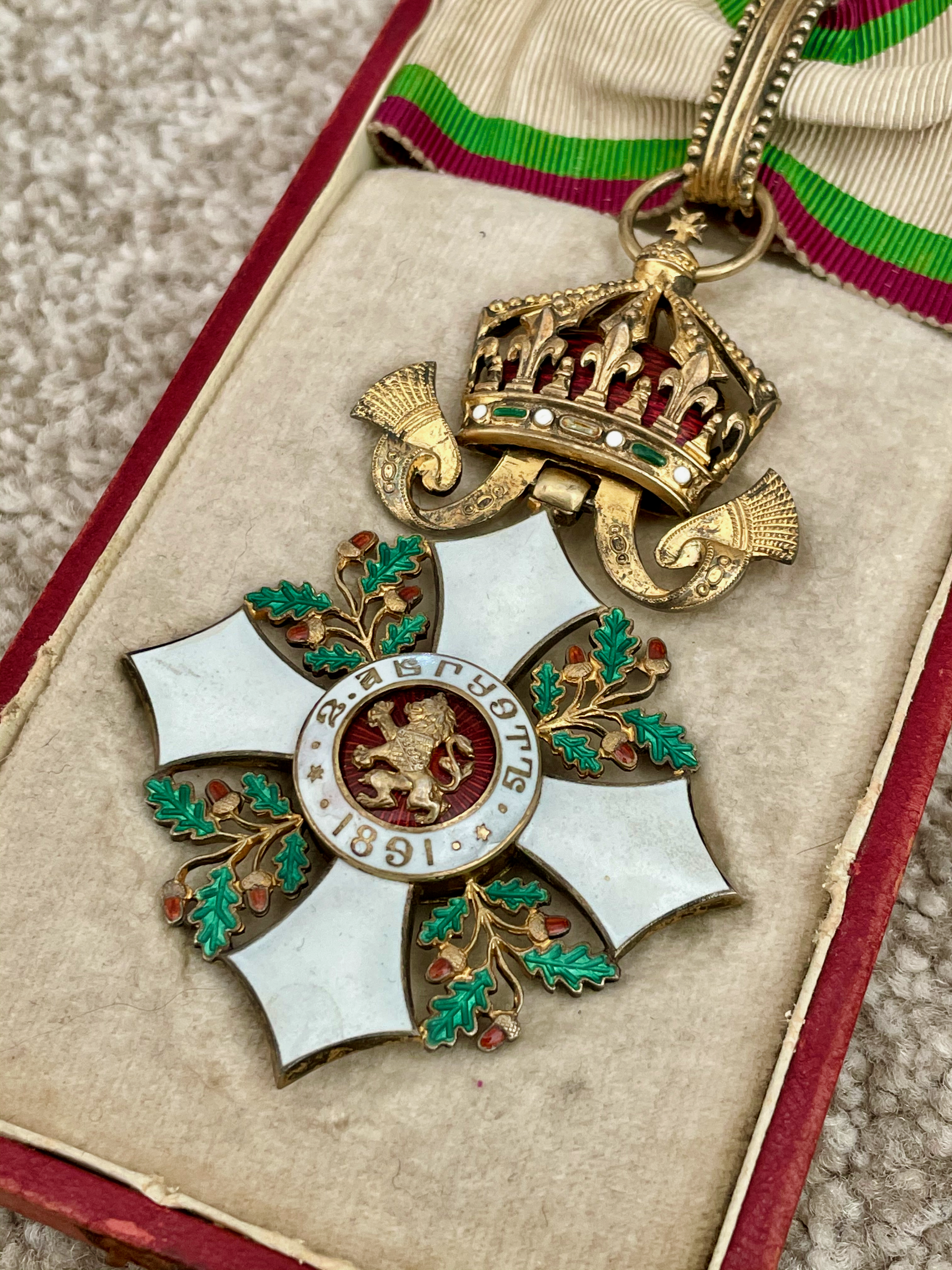
Commander reverse badge (1908-1944).

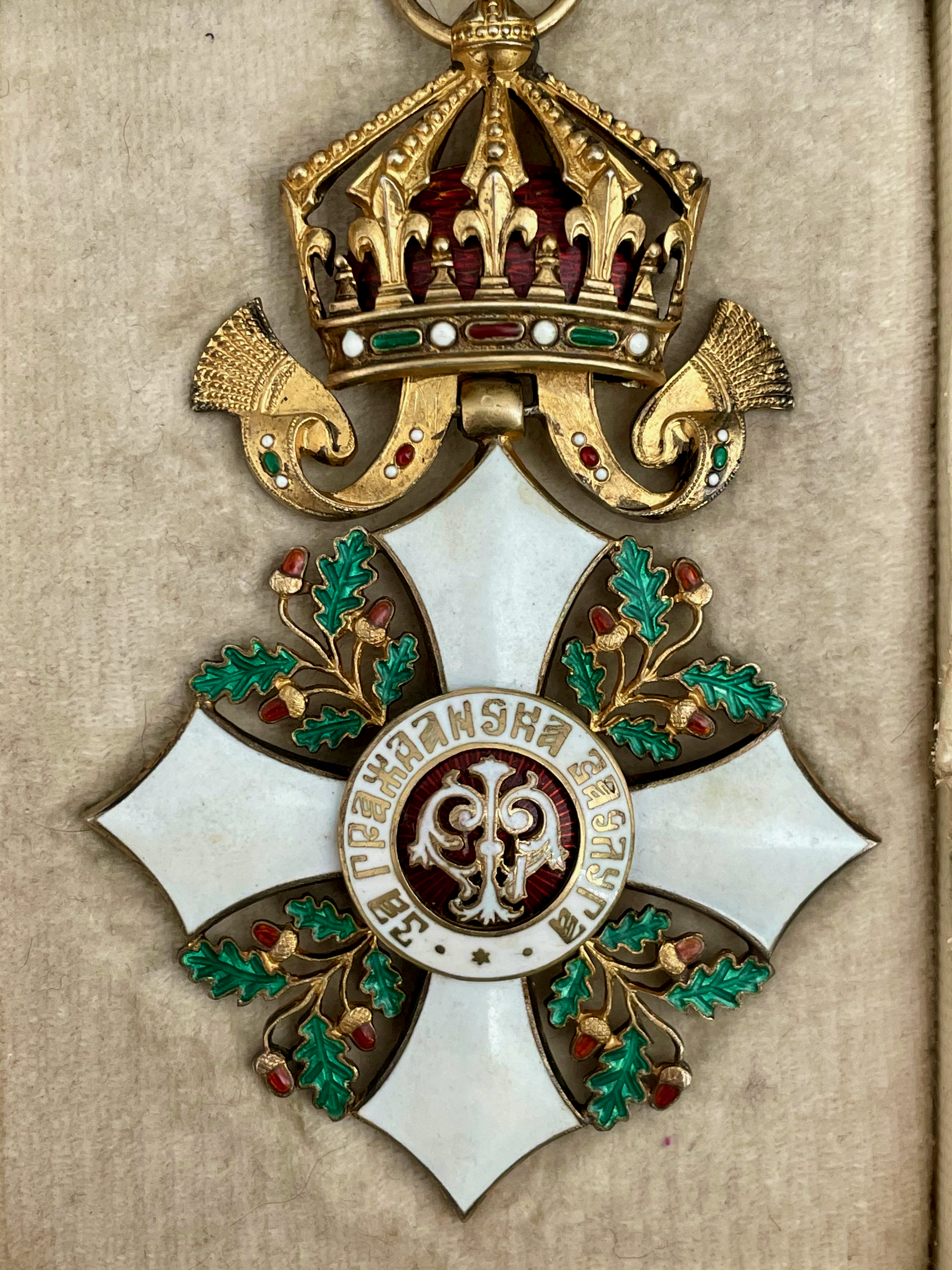
Commander obverse badge (1908-1944).

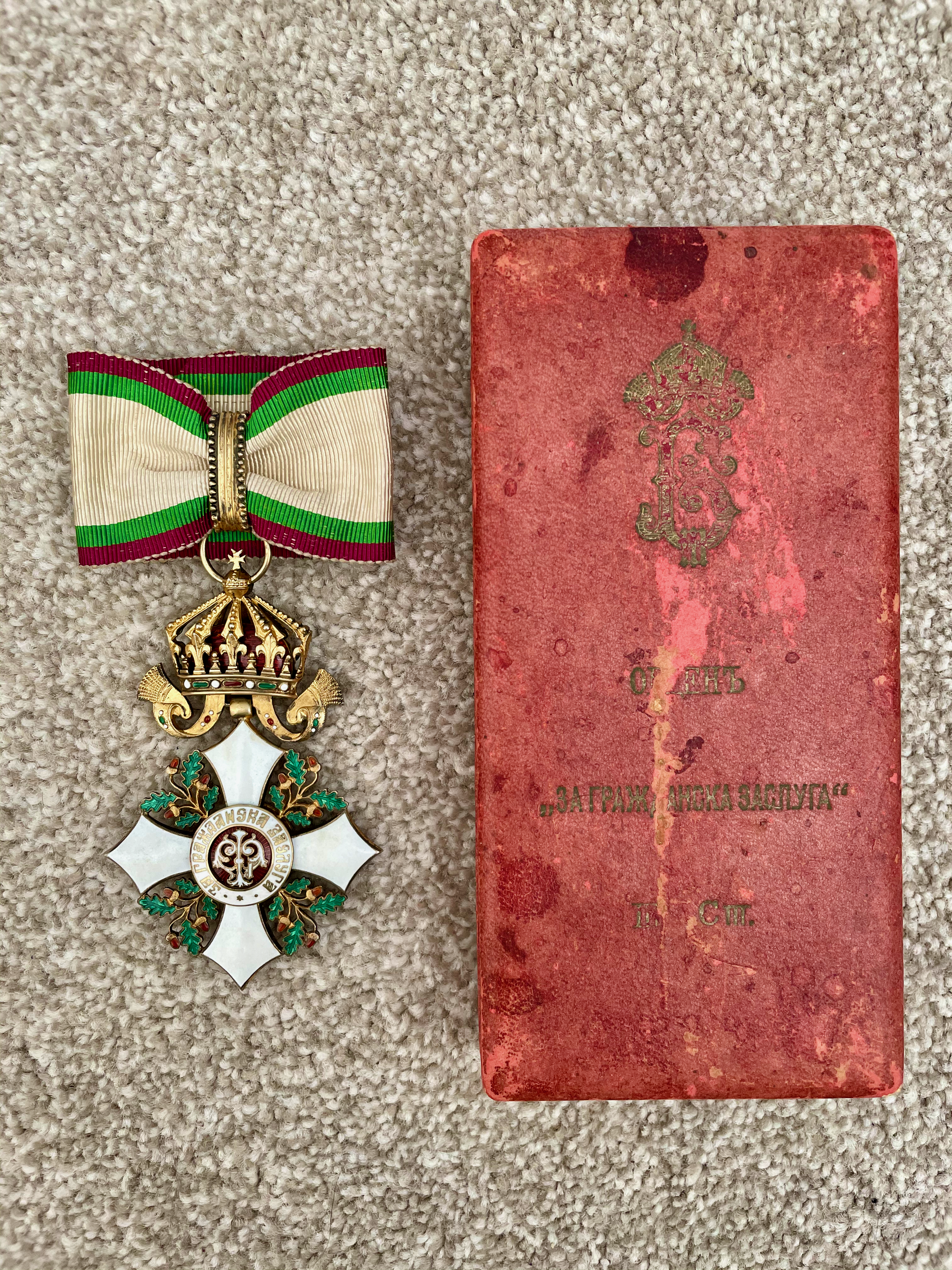
Commander grade and case from the reign of Boris III.

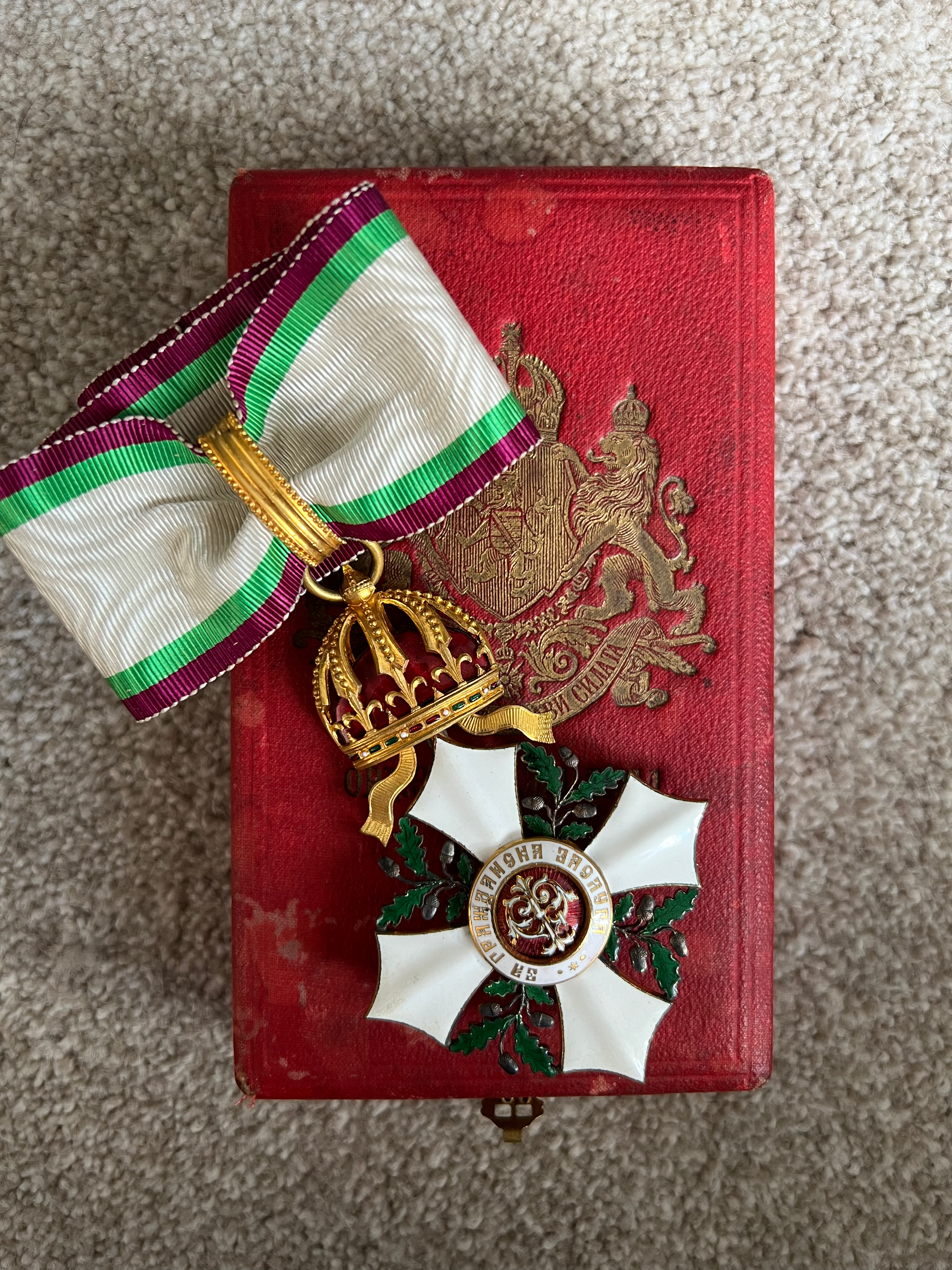
Commanders class of the Princely version of the order (1908-1946).

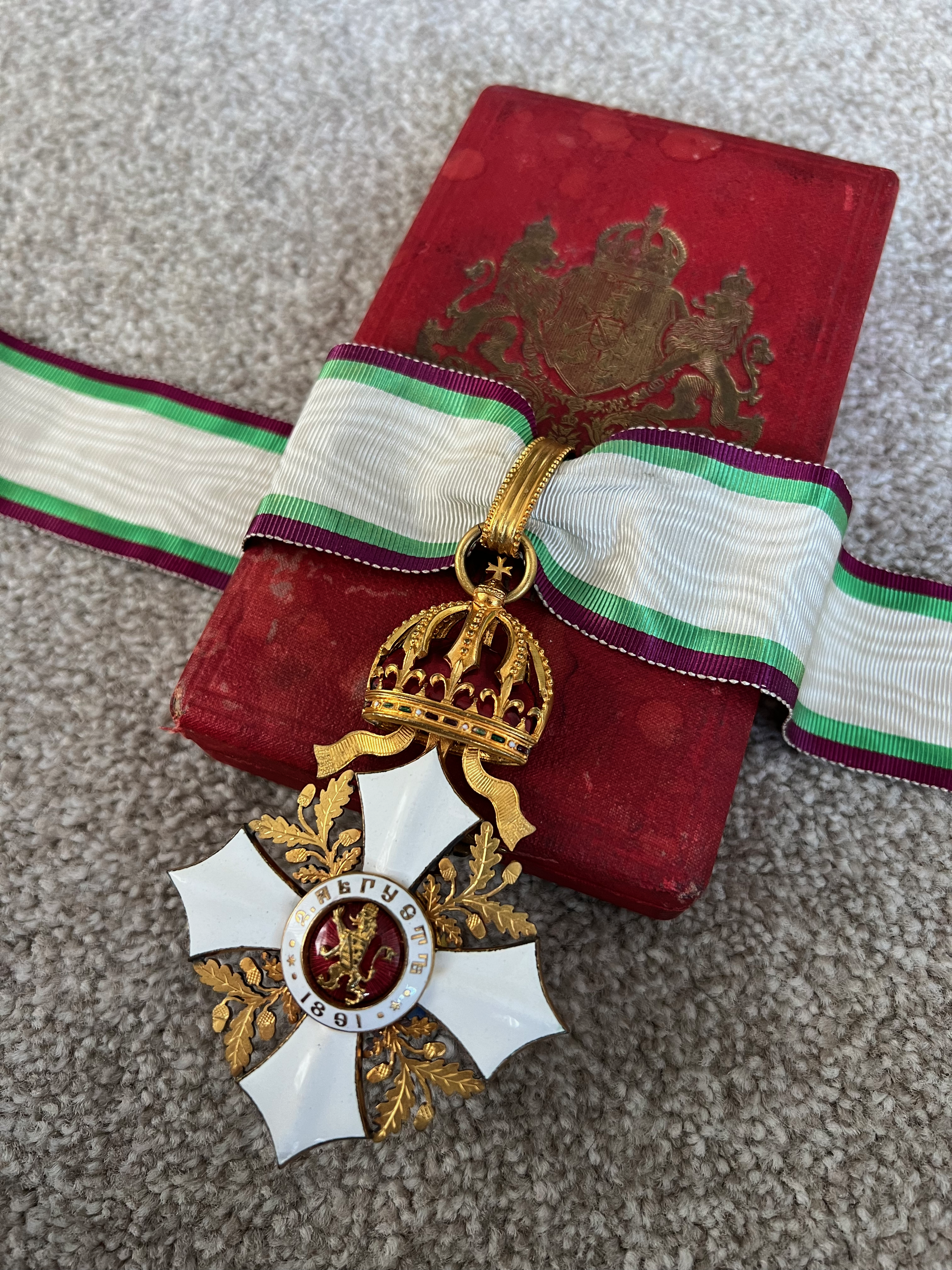
Commanders class of the Princely version of the order (1908-1946).

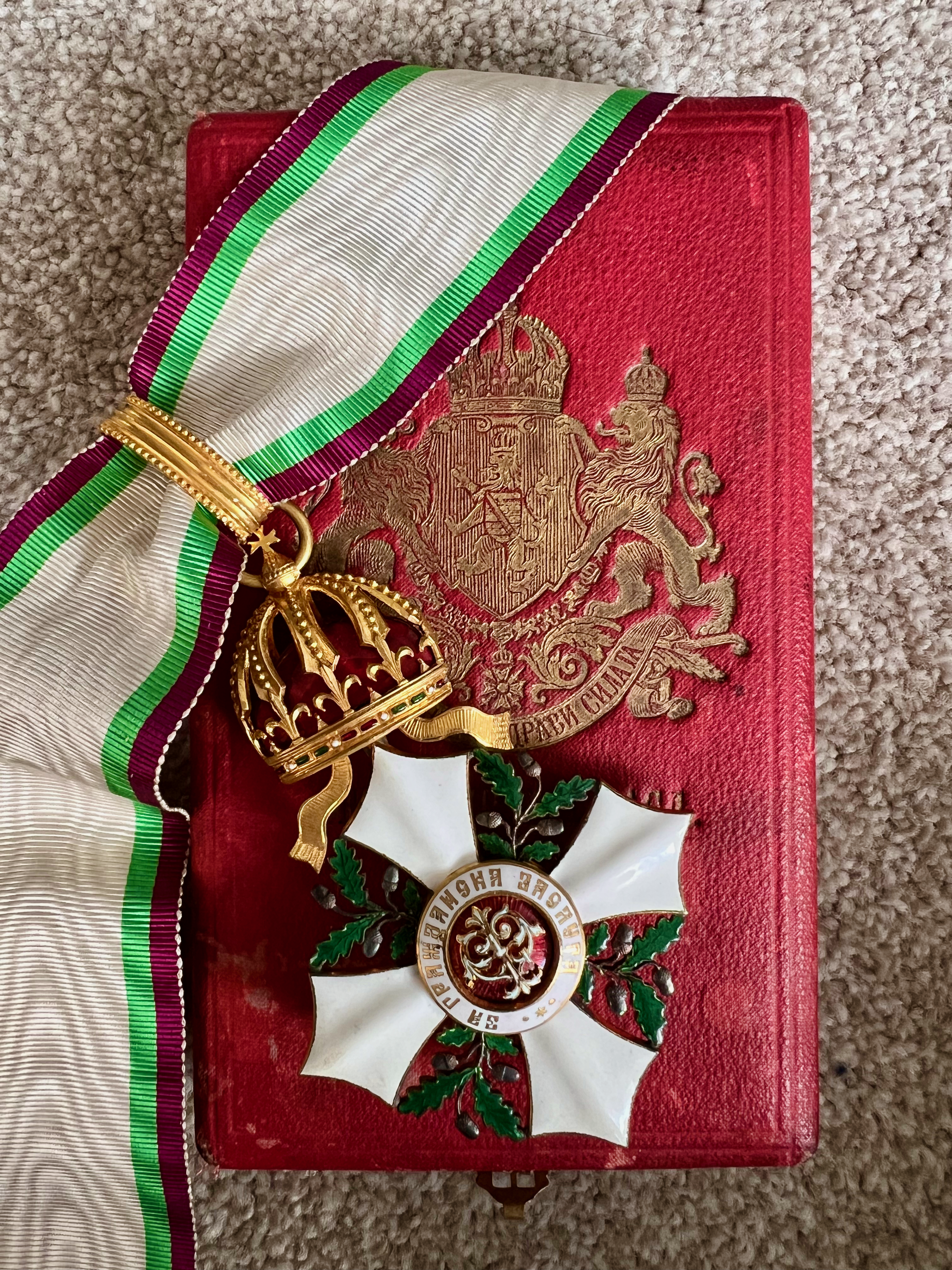
Commanders class of the Princely version of the order (1908-1946).

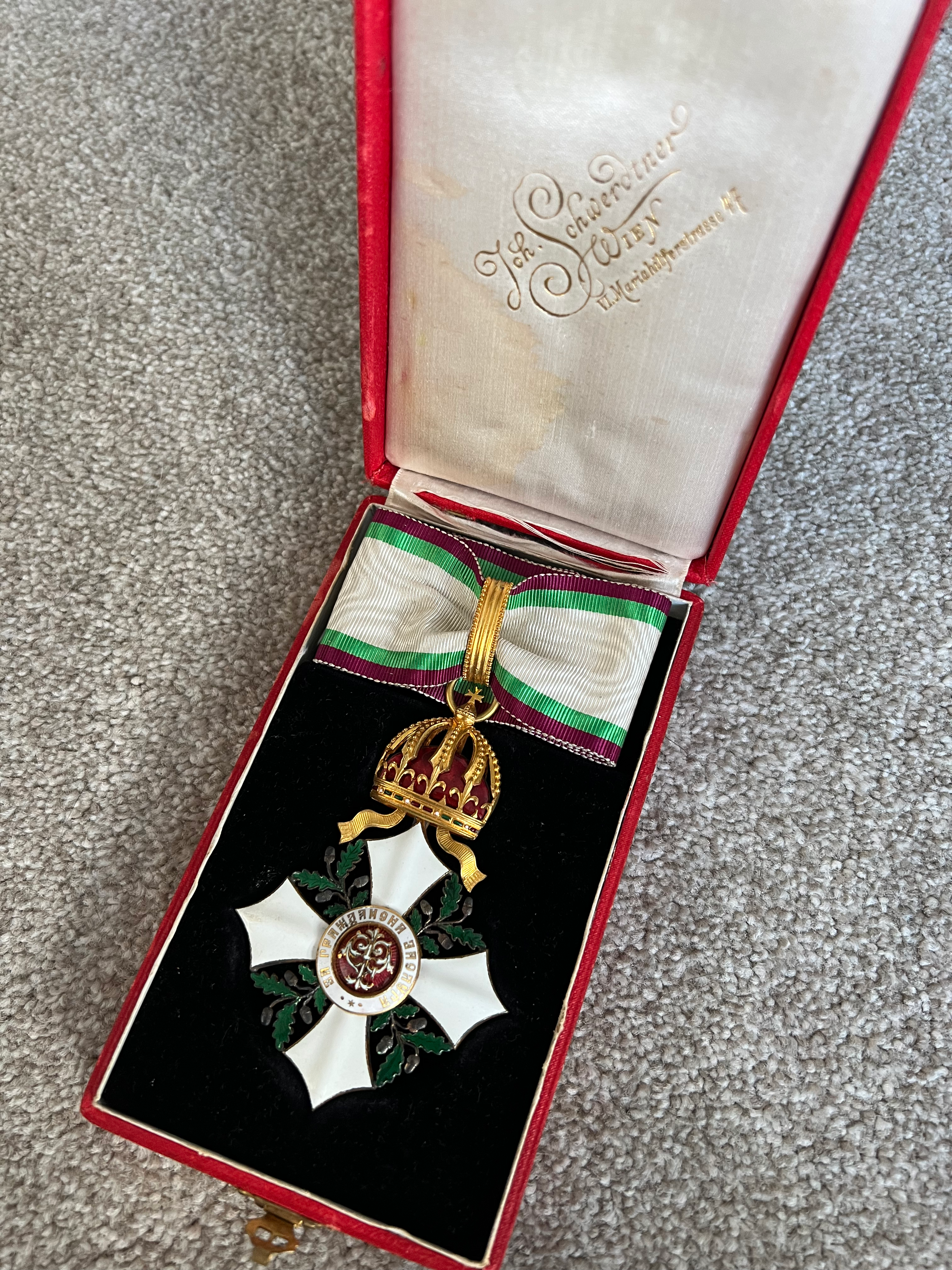
Commanders class of the Princely version of the order (1908-1946) by Johann Schwerdtner of Vienna.

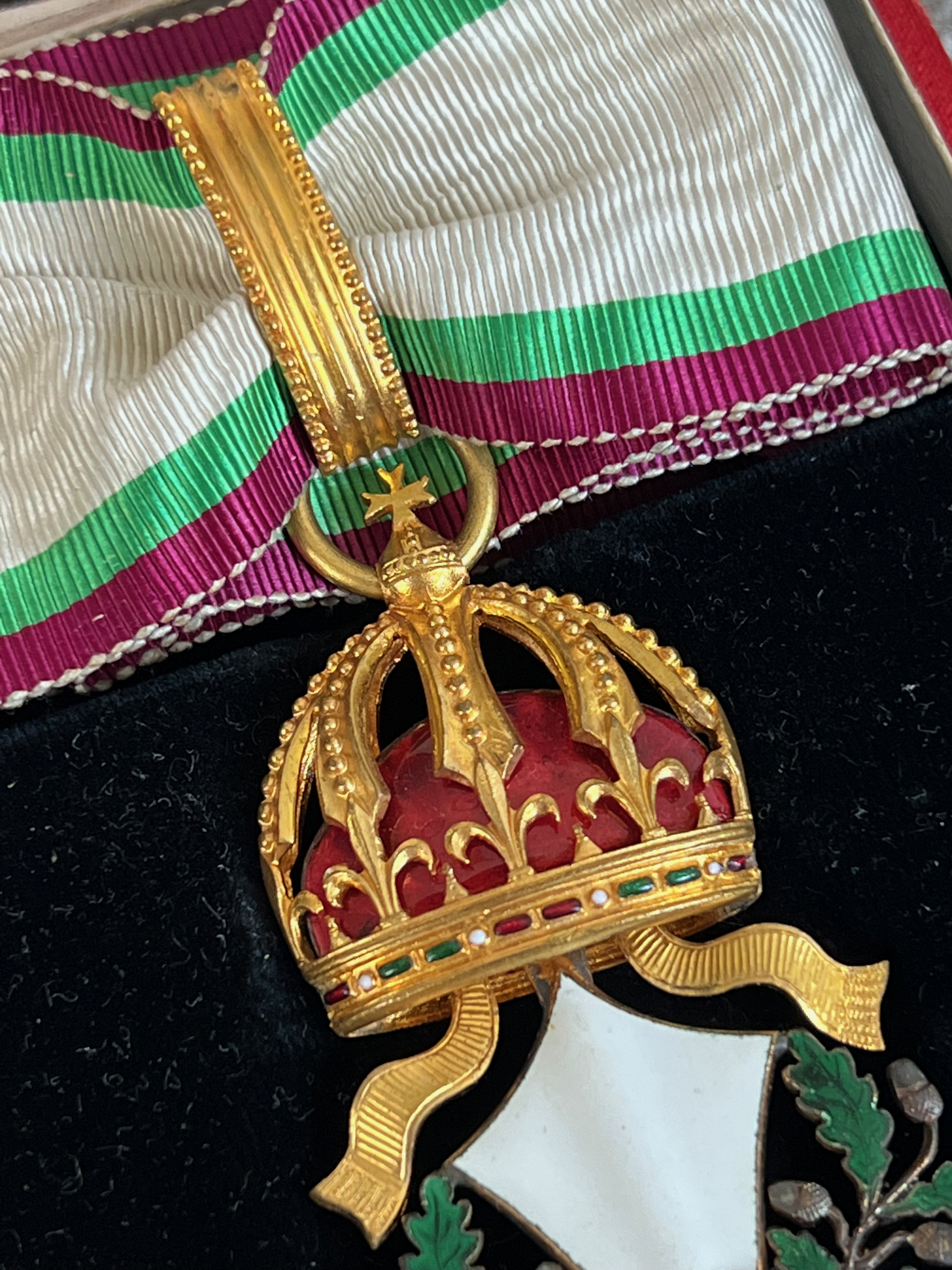
The "Princely Crown" of Bulgaria used as the suspension on models of the order from 1891-1908.

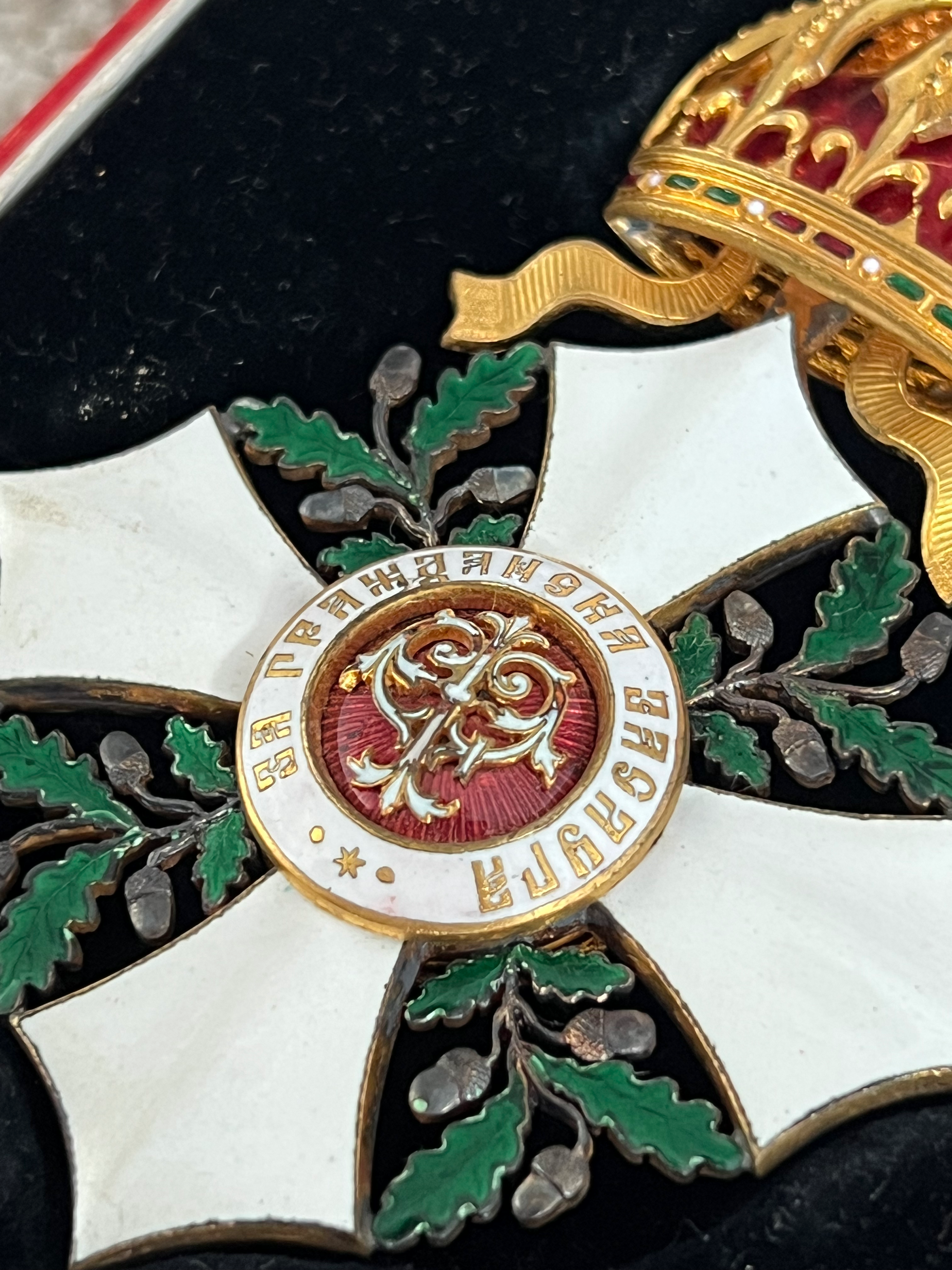
Close-up of the obverse of the cross showing Ferdinand I's monogram.

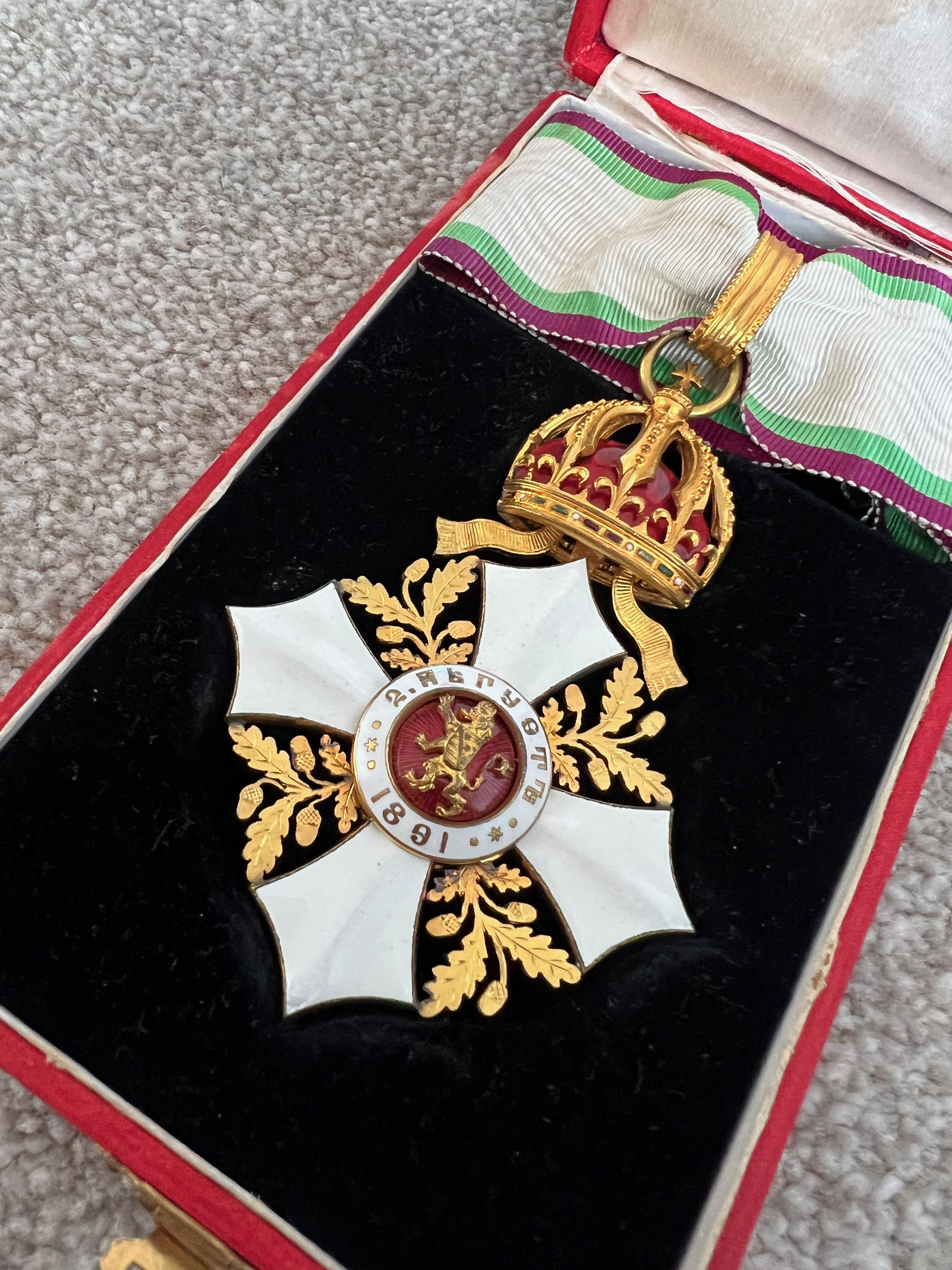
Close-up of the reverse of the badge of the Commanders Class showing the un-enamelled oak leaves on some sets of insignia.

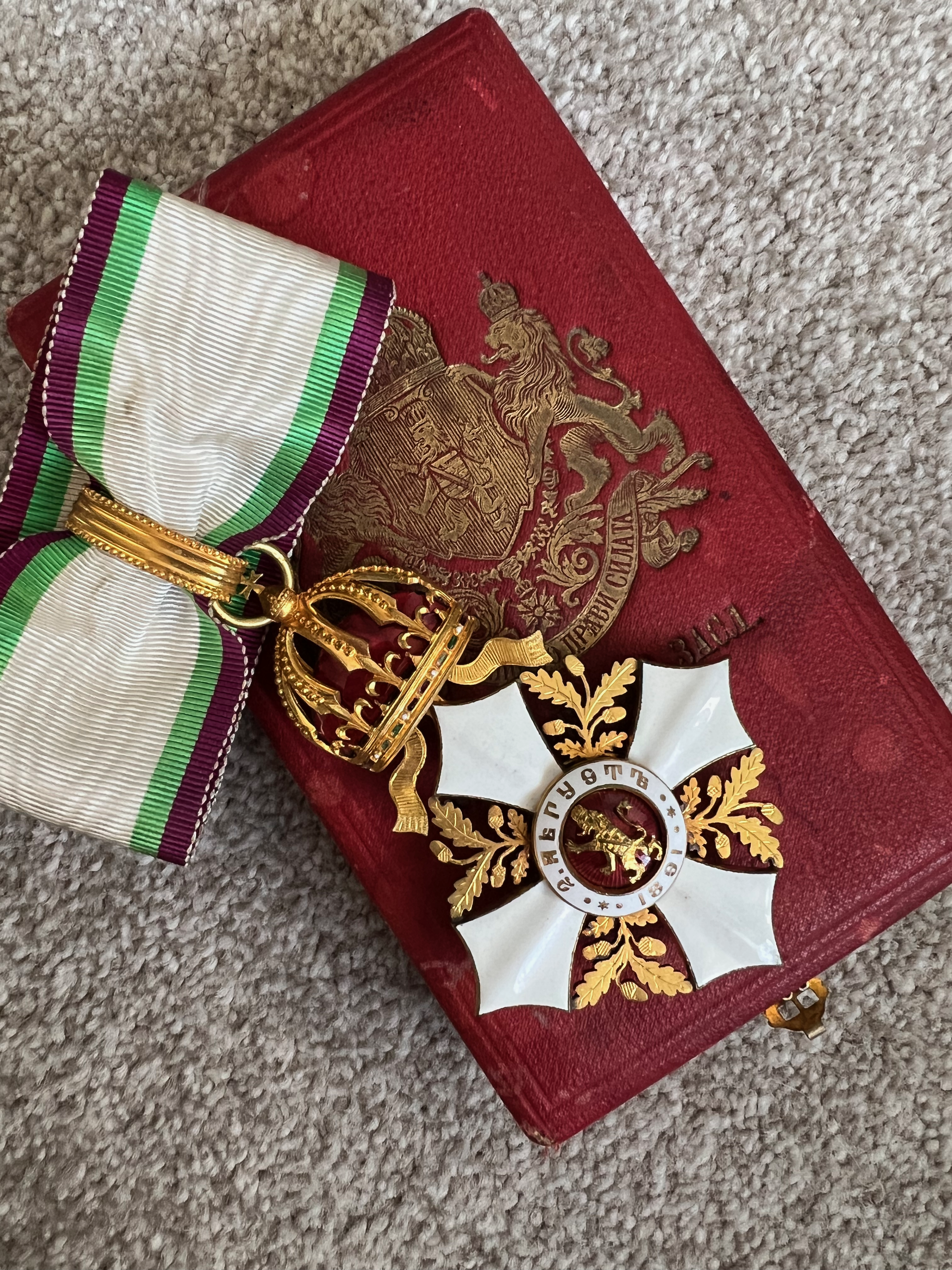
Commanders class of the Princely version of the order (1908-1946).

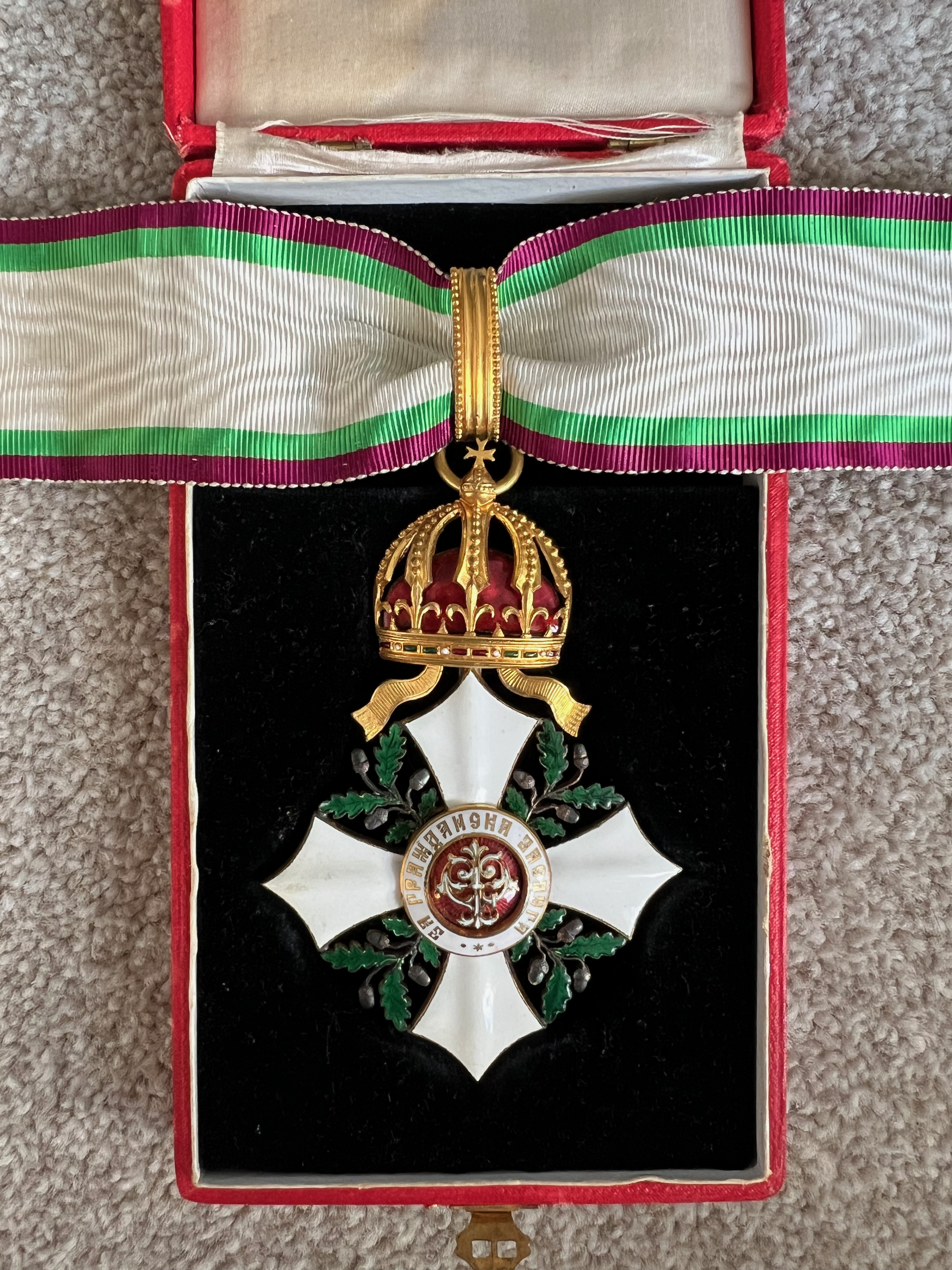
Commanders class of the Princely version of the order (1908-1946).

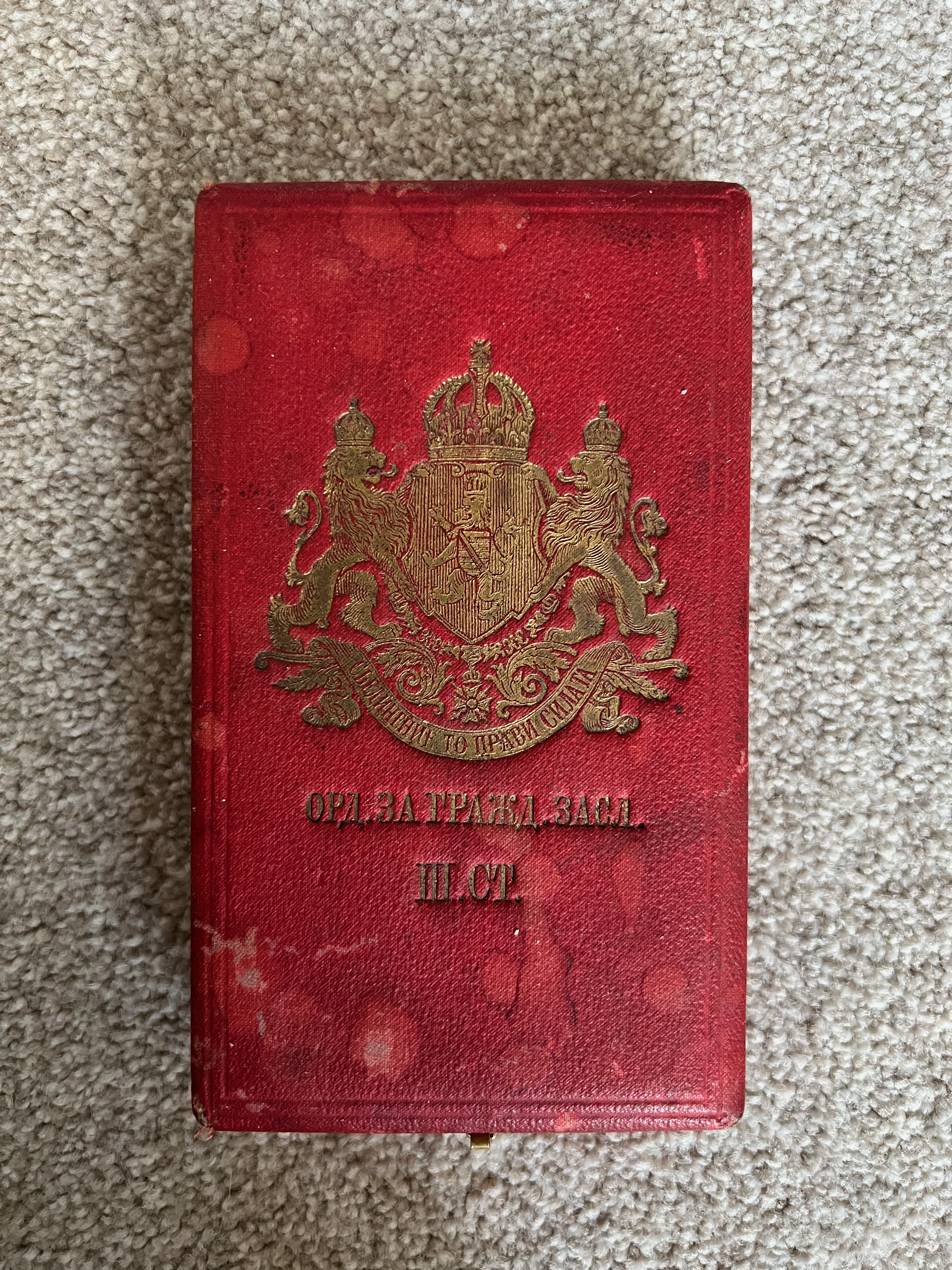
Case for the Commanders Class, bearing the Royal Arms of the Kingdom of Bulgaria c.1895

== The Republic Order ==
The Order was revived by the current Republic of Bulgaria. However today it is only awarded to Bulgarian citizens. In addition the Order now is only made up of the Officer and Commander grades, and the reverse and obverse of the modern order are switched around. What was the reverse on the Kingdom order is now the obverse and depicts the Bulgarian lion, however without the Saxon shield. The new reverse no longer depicts the royal monogram of Ferdinand I, and instead a rotated tricolour of the Bulgarian flag. While the exact shading has differed dramatically, the ribbon has remained mostly unchanged, interestingly as has also the crown suspension.
