= Order of People's Freedom =

Order of People's Freedom 1941–1944
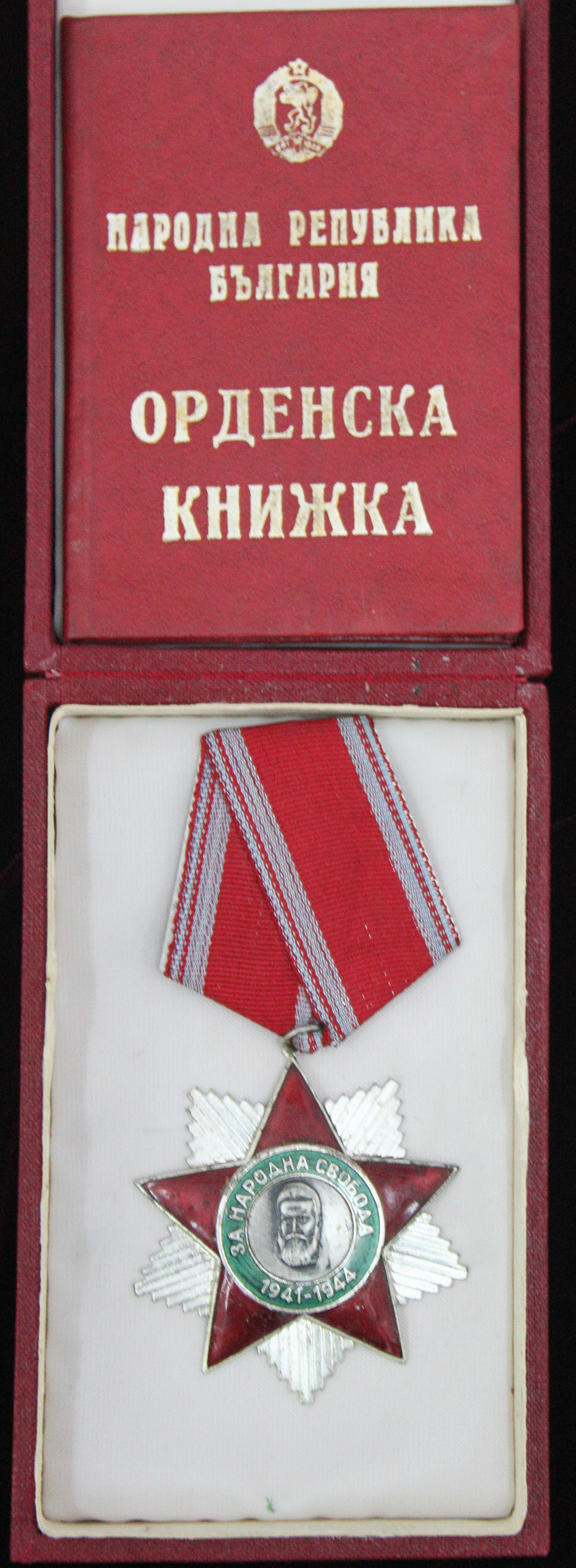
- Type: Order
- Presented by: The Bulgarian monarch (1944–1946), People's Republic of Bulgaria (1946–1990)
- Eligibility: Bulgarian and foreign citizens
- Status: obsolete since 1990
- Established: 1945

Precedence
- Next (higher): National Order of Labour
- Next (lower): Order of Labour Glory

The Order of People's Liberty was an Order of Merit of the Kingdom of Bulgaria from 1945 to 1946, and of the People's Republic of Bulgaria from 1946 to 1990. Originally it consisted of simply a breast star, but later became issued as a breast badge.
