= Reuben H. Markham =

American journalist

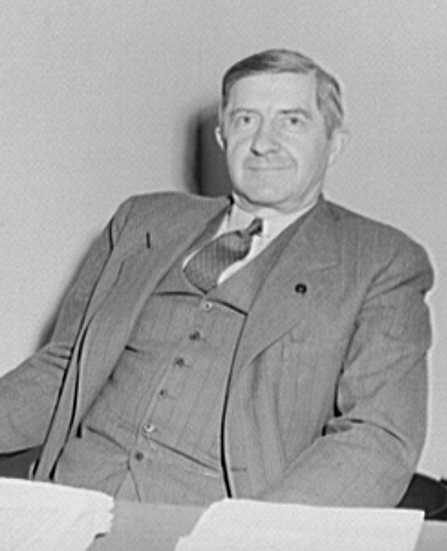
- Reuben Markham in 1943
- Born: February 21, 1887; Smith Center, Kansas, U.S.
- Died: December 29, 1949 (aged 62)
- Education: Washburn College; Columbia University; Union Theological Seminary
- Occupations: Journalist, author
- Notable work: The Wave of the Past

Reuben Henry Markham (February 21, 1887 – December 29, 1949) was a journalist for the Christian Science Monitor who wrote numerous books, including "an attack on fascism,"The Wave of the Past, which urged American intervention in World War II. After the war he published four works condemning the Soviet takeover of Eastern Europe.

== Early life ==
Reuben Markham was born on a farm in the Twelve Mile area of Smith County, Kansas on February 21, 1887. His grandfather, Reuben Fuller Markham, and his father, Lucius Markham, were both Congregational ministers. Markham family records show that Reuben Fuller Markham participated in the Underground Railroad. During Reconstruction era, he was a financial agent for the American Missionary Association, which founded eleven historically black colleges, including Beach Institute in Savannah, Georgia where he taught from 1875 to 1880. At 14, Markham was sent to Washburn Academy in Topeka, Kansas, where he also attended Washburn College, graduating in 1908, as valedictorian. The following year, he married Mary Gall, who had been the class salutatorian. Matriculating at Union Theological Seminary, Markham also received an M.A. in education from Columbia University. In 1912, Markham too was ordained as a minister in the Congregational church.

== Years in Bulgaria ==
That same year, Markham and his wife volunteered as missionary-educators for the American Board of Commissioners for Foreign Missions in Samokov, Bulgaria, where the Board operated Western style Boys and Girls boarding schools on the same campus. Their three children, Eleonora, Helen and Jordan were born in Samokov.

In 1918, the Markhams returned to America across war-torn Europe, with the assistance of the American legation in Sofia, and the Bulgarian government, which helped fund the trip, in order to support the position of the Wilson Administration, the Congregational church and Bulgaria that America not declare war on the Balkan nation. With the approval of the American Board, Markham testified in front of the Senate Committee on Foreign Relations, which decided to recommend American neutrality towards Bulgaria.

After completing his testimony, he joined a government sponsored YMCA mission to provide agricultural expertise to Russia, but was turned back in Murmansk in 1918 by the revolutionary Soviet government. In order to finish the year of YMCA work, he assisted Russian prisoners of war in France. Although offered the pulpit of an Unitarian Church in Palo Alto, Ca., Markham felt it was his "duty" to explain both the Balkans to Americans through a series of books as well as bring information on "the best things in Anglo-Saxon religion, education and literature" to the Bulgarians.

Markham returned to Bulgaria in 1920, where, in addition to his teaching, he began to edit the Mission's publications and to write for Bulgarian newspapers, using them to criticize the regime's treatment of workers and peasants after a military coup in 1923. He "was forced to resign (from the Mission) in 1925… as a result of his outspoken opposition to official persecution of the peasants." Markham then started his own Bulgarian language newspaper, Svet, (World), which addressed Bulgaria's major issues, including governmental repression. He wrote about the "illegal" "slaughter" of prisoners "killed without trial or sentence." Markham was charged by the government for this reporting and put on trial in May 1927 in Sofia, but was acquitted. Svet shut down on August 2, 1928.

== Foreign Correspondent for the Christian Science Monitor ==
From 1927 until his death in 1949, Markham worked primarily as a journalist for the Christian Science Monitor. After joining the Monitor's staff in 1927, he soon became correspondent for the Balkans. In 1931, he self-published Meet Bulgaria, describing Bulgarian history, economics and culture.

In 1933, the Markhams moved from Sofia to Vienna, where Reuben became the Monitor's Central European correspondent. Vienna was the home of an active Anglo-American press corps during the interwar years, including Dorothy Thompson, William Shirer, and John Gunther. Here Markham was given several broader assignments as well. In 1935, he was sent to Ethiopia to cover the Italian invasion. The following year, he travelled to the Middle East, where he combined stories on current conditions with Biblical events. He turned this work into the Bulgarian language book, "The Cradle of Humanity, Past and Present." In 1938, Markham covered the Anschluss from Vienna, and afterwards moved his Monitor headquarters to Budapest.

Returning to the United States in June, 1939, Markham conducted a lecture tour and wrote a series of articles in August for the Monitor entitled "Rediscovering America," in which he directly addressed his position in the looming war. "I had long observed the workings of the Nazi machine and had felt convinced that its builders would not pause in the expansionist program....If these states (Great Britain and France) are crushed, the foundations for democracy will be swept away....The issue is clear….self-government…is in danger of destruction....Humanity may again be thrust into the old abyss of absolutism....I believe that is my struggle too." The Markhams were caught by the outbreak of World War II and remained in the United States. For the next three years, he carried out assignments of feature articles about America, such as "Mr. Markham Goes to Washington," and "Mr. Markham Polls the People."

== World War II ==
In March 1941, Markham weighed in on 'the Great Debate' over America's entry into World War II, when he published The Wave of the Past, his rebuttal to Anne Morrow Lindbergh's no. 1, non-fiction, best seller The Wave of the Future which President Franklin Roosevelt referenced in his third inaugural address. She called her book "a moral argument for isolationism." In contrast, Markham, whose "hostility to Nazism was instinctive and passionate," argued that isolationism would lead to the loss of American freedom. "In this issue," Markham wrote, "there are only two sides. No neutral course remains...he either opposes the onslaught of Hitlerism or supports it. If he makes no choice, that is a choice; if he takes no action, he is on Hitler's side; if he does not act, that is an act--for Hitler.... To prevent that will be our first step. Whatever it may cost, we shall take it."

The Wave of the Past sold 140,000 copies, making it a best seller too, and it was mentioned by Eleanor Roosevelt in her daily column, My Day. "Another small book by an American who originally came from Kansas but has lived for many years in the Balkans is apparently inspired by Anne Lindbergh's book, 'The Wave of the Future.' Markham writes 'The Wave of the Past' and insists 'The past has its mark and the future has its mark. The one is slavery and the other is freedom.' I think you will find both of these books of interest."

The Wave of the Past also states that "tyrants become world masters only when...men call...tyranny freedom." Explaining how dictatorships distort reality by equating opposites, Markham wrote in an article at this time in the Monitor that "the multitudes are told that chains give freedom, that slavery is liberty, that war is peace, that the black resurging past is the future." These concepts and phrasing anticipate the Ministry of Truth's slogans in George Orwell's Nineteen Eighty-Four: "WAR IS PEACE, SLAVERY IS FREEDOM, IGNORANCE IS STRENGTH" .

Once the United States entered the war, Markham was able to participate in the national effort by joining the Office of War Information (OWI) as the deputy director for the Balkans. In February 1944, he returned to Europe, spending much of his time at a listening station in Bari, Italy. There he saw a great deal of the Partisan movement led by Communist Joseph Tito, and came to think it would install a dictatorial regime if it were to come to power. He wrote: "I have just spent months in direct contact with (the Partisans) and...I saw they are by no means democratic. They are among the world's most fanatical autocrats."

As a result, "he was one of the first to perceive what was happening in Eastern Europe in 1944." When British Prime Minister Winston Churchill and Roosevelt threw their support to Tito, and withdrew it from Serbian Chetnik leader Draza Mihailovic, Markham believed it meant that the post-war Yugoslavia would become Communist, as might all of southeastern Europe. He felt that Britain and "to a certain extent" America were complicit in helping Tito fight the Serbs in a civil war, communicating his concerns directly to General Eisenhower's chief political advisor, Robert Murphy. The O.W.I. official "mounted a blistering attack on Anglo-American aid to the communist Tito, which reverberated all the way to the offices of the J.C.S. (Joint Chiefs of Staff)." "...the Serbs say," Markham wrote, "that in 1944 they went through another Kossovo, inflicted not by hostile invaders only but also by their allies, their Croat fellow-citizens and Serb Communists. If the Serbs didn't forget the old Kossovo, will they forget the new?...I am not saying this will be nice. I am not praising Serb nationalism....I am just reporting....someday it will explode."

Unwilling to support this policy, Markham resigned from the government in October 1944. The Director of OWI, Elmer Davis, explained, "Eventually, he came to the conclusion that American policy in dealing with the Balkan countries—the support of all elements, including the Communists, that were resisting the Germans—was mistaken....The event proved that the policy which was followed led to precisely the unfortunate results which he foresaw."

== The Cold War ==
In 1945, after the war ended, the Monitor posted Markham to Bulgaria, Hungary and Romania where he wrote about Communist activities in Central and Southeastern Europe. The White House had also wanted to get him back into Eastern Europe, and once there, in addition to his journalism, he was able to send his findings directly to the President through the State Department's Mission in Sofia, Bulgaria, reporting that "the majority of Bulgaria considers itself in totalitarian prison." In June 1946, he was expelled from Romania and denied entrance to other Communist controlled nations: "his going from that scene was considered by all Romanians as a sort of national tragedy." Fellow journalist, Dorothy Thompson, described his work. "Mr. Markham has done the fairest and most objective reporting from any Russian-occupied area. He has been meticulous about details, figures and places....If, therefore, Mr. Markham...cannot operate in Russian and Russian-occupied territory, the burden is on the Russians to prove that any honest...reporter can." Meeting with reporters afterwards, the expelled Monitor correspondent described one incident telling them that after covering a peasant party meeting that was broken up by a 'band of ruffians,' he had spent the night with "the local leader of the peasant party in Bucovina....Later the 'band of ruffians'...came into the house at midnight and killed the political leader with bursts of machine gun fire." Shortly after his expulsion, on August 7, Markham met directly with President Truman at the White House.

While in Bulgaria, Markham issued a call for the United States to provide economic assistance to a devastated Europe, predating the Marshall Plan by almost two years. "The choice clearly falls upon America. We must lead in the healing, restoring and recovering. It is the most onerous and the grandest task we ever performed. It is harder than Valley Forge or Gettysburg. We must give of our purse and larder and heart."

Markham was known for "his outspoken stand against communism," writing and lecturing to warn the United States of the dangers of totalitarian Communist rule. He completed his book on Yugoslavia, Tito's Imperial Communism, in 1947. Writing about Yugoslavia was challenging, not only over the question of whether or not to support Tito, but also because of Yugoslavia's ethnic animosities, which exploded in the 1990s. Markham himself wrote, "Practically every point treated in this book is controversial...." In its announcement of its publication, the University of North Carolina Press stated that this "book presents more fully than ever before the Serb point of view...."

A second work describing events in Eastern Europe, Rumania Under the Soviet Yoke came out in 1949. The New York Times wrote that Markham's volume "presents the facts of Soviet Communism in Rumania in stirring and human terms... By writing about one country (of Eastern Europe) in detail and with understanding, Markham has written about them all." In 1949, he also self published a pamphlet entitled Let Us Protestants Awake! that criticized Protestant church leaders who lent their support to Communist-led regimes in Europe.

In May 1949, Markham returned to government service on "the urgent insistence of Washington," in the newly created Central Intelligence Agency. He worked closely with the National Committee for a Free Europe, negotiating its covert relationship with the Office of Policy Coordination, along with its head Frank Wisner. One of Markham's primary responsibilities was to edit a "series of pamphlets on the influence of Communism on the different phases of life in Eastern and Southeastern Europe." He met frequently with Eastern European exiles, collecting information on the most recent Communist activity in their countries. The day before he suffered his heart attack he completed editing "Communists Crush Churches in Eastern Europe," the first in his projected series of booklets.

After his death on December 29, 1949, the Christian Science Monitor published an editorial about Markham entitled "Friend of Humanity" saying: "Moscow understood how devastatingly its pretended regard for the 'little man,' its ideological abstractions and its massive brutality were shown up by this humanitarian scholar's genuine love of liberty and of his fellow men."

== Legacy ==
Markham was "noted as a writer, lecturer, and author," and for opposing dictatorships from his days in Bulgaria in the 1920s, to Nazi Germany, to the Soviet Union after World War II. He had decades of experience in the Balkans and used his pen to bring attention to these countries as they fell under Communist rule. Erwin Canham, the Monitor's longest serving editor, wrote that Markham's "work stands almost alone in American journalism for its simplicity, integrity, and direct, personal knowledge."

== Publications ==
- A Poor Man's Pilgrimage to the Holy Land, 1924 (In Bulgarian: Сиромашки хаджилък)
- Bulgaria Today and Tomorrow, 1926
- Meet Bulgaria, 1931
- The Cradle of Humanity, Past and Present, 1937 (In Bulgarian: Люлката на човечеството: Някога и сега)
- The Wave of the Past, 1941, Chapel Hill: The University of North Carolina Press.
- Tito's Imperial Communism, 1947, Chapel Hill: The University Of North Carolina Press
- Let Us Protestants Awake!, 1949
- Rumania Under the Soviet Yoke, 1949, Boston: Meador Pub. Co
- Communists Crush Churches in Eastern Europe, 1950, Boston: Meador Pub. Co

== Awards ==
- Distinguished Service Award, Washburn University Alumni Association, 1949
- Royal Order of Civil Merit, Bulgaria, Commander, 1939
