= Twelve Mile, Kansas =

- Ghost town
- Location within the state of Kansas Twelve Mile (the United States)
- Coordinates: 39°37′28″N 98°38′01″W
- Country: United States
- State: Kansas
- County: Smith
- Elevation: 1,634 ft (498 m)

Population
  - Total: 0
- Time zone: UTC-6 (CST)
  - Summer (DST): UTC-5 (CDT)
- Area code: 785
- GNIS ID: 482616

Twelve Mile is a ghost town in Smith County, Kansas, United States.

== History ==
Twelve Mile was issued a post office in 1874. The post office was discontinued in 1894. Joe Gledhill was one of the early residents of the area and its longtime postmaster. A stone marker was placed on Gledhill's homestead in 1939 by his son Arthur "commemorating the settlement of Twelve Mile Valley and the establishment in 1874 of the Twelve Mile post office in the home of Joseph Gledhill." According to a narrative written by Arthur Gledhill in the 1930s, settler L.G. Stone was the first of a party of 65 who came from New Haven, Connecticut to settle in the Twelve Mile community. Stone first came in the spring on 1871 as an advance scout of the area, and the full group came in 1872.

An 1882 local newspaper item described Twelve Mile as "not a town" but a "scope of country" named after a local large creek, and the "best settled and best improved portion of Smith county," containing two "good stone churches" and a "good frame school house."

In 1940, the Christian Science Monitor published a piece by Reuben H. Markham, who grew up in the community. He wrote about a recent visit to Twelve Mile, mourning the passing of the community he once knew, but recognizing it as a nationwide trend of rural depopulation in the United States.
