= Order of Military Merit (Bulgaria) =

Royal Order of Military Merit Царски орден „За военна заслуга“
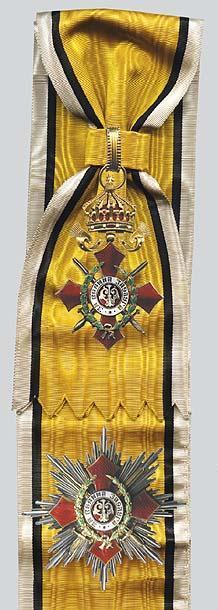
- Grand Cross set of the Order

Awarded by The King of the Bulgarians
- Type: Dynastic Order
- Royal house: House of Saxe-Coburg-Gotha-Koháry
- Religious affiliation: Bulgarian Orthodox
- Ribbon: Yellow with a thin Black stripe on either side and a White stripe on either edge
- Eligibility: Military personnel
- Awarded for: Awarded for great contributions for the development and the consolidation of the Bulgarian Army, for participation in peacekeeping, peacemaking and humanitarian operations, for long and immaculate service and contribution for the national security and civil order in Bulgaria.
- Status: Unconstituted
- Grand Master: King Simeon II
- Grades: Grand Cross; Grand Officer; Commander; Officer; Knight; Silver Cross

Precedence
- Next (higher): Royal Order of Bravery
- Next (lower): Royal Order of National Labour
- Equivalent: Royal Order of Civil Merit
- The ribbon of the Order

The Order of Military Merit (Bulgarian: Орден „За военна заслуга“) is a Bulgarian order during the Kingdom of Bulgaria and the Republic of Bulgaria. It is the third highest order in the Republic of Bulgaria along with the Order of Civil Merit and the Order of the Madara Rider.

== The Royal Order ==
The order was established with a decree of the Knyaz on 19 May 1900 as a sign of the benevolence of the Monarch to the bravery of the Bulgarian army. It was similar to the Order of Civil Merit but made for military personnel. The order was given to military figures for immaculate service and special merit. It was established with six grades and in 1933 the Grand Cross was added.

The order had a shape of Pisan cross with shoulder covered in red enamel. There were two swords between them with edges pointing to the top. In the centre of the averse was placed the monogram of the founder Knyaz Ferdinand, surrounded by a ring in green enamel with inscription ЗА ВОЕННА ЗАСЛУГА (For Military Merit). The averse resembled that of the Order of Civil Merit but with green ring. It had a royal crown on the top.

During war, the order had a slightly different resemblance with a laurel wreath on the shoulders of the cross and white ring.

The Grand Cross was worn on a wide yellow ribbon with black and white edges - the colours of the Saxe-Coburg and Gotha dynasty. The fourth, fifth and sixth grade were worn on a small triangle ribbon on the chest.

After 9 September 1944 the ribbon was substituted with one of the Order of Civil Merit, the monogram of Ferdinand was removed and replaced with the Bulgaria tricolour flag. In the 1950s the order was abolished. It was restored in two grades in 2004.

=== Grades ===
- I grade, Grand Cross. Awarded to senior state officers and military personnel. It was worn with a sash over the shoulder.
- II grade, Grand Officer. Awarded only to generals. It is similar to the cross of I grade but had a size of 63 mm. It was worn with a ribbon around the neck. In addition to the badge, holders of the grand officers’ cross also display a rhomboid silver breast star (88 mm) made of four sets of silvery rays and the order badge superimposed over the centre. It’s worn on the left side of the chest.
- III grade, Commander. Awarded to commanders of regiments (colonels and lieutenant colonels). The size of the cross was between 54 and 63 mm. It had no stars and was worn with a ribbon around the neck.
- IV grade, Officer. Awarded to majors and captains who commanded companies. It was similar to the cross of III grade but smaller - between 48 and 51 mm.
- V grade, Knight. Awarded to commanders with rank up to captain, Opalchentsi, volunteers in the Serbo-Bulgarian War, the Balkan Wars and others. The size was between 48 and 51 mm.
- VI grade, Silver Cross. Awarded to sergeants, Opalchentsi, volunteers in the wars and others. The diameter of the cross was 46 mm.
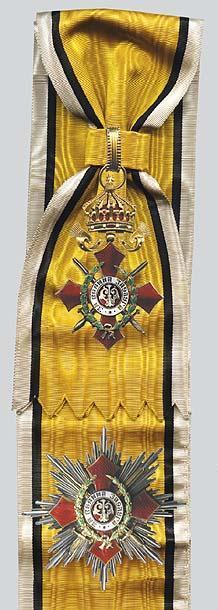
Order of Military Merit I grade with crown, swords and war decoration

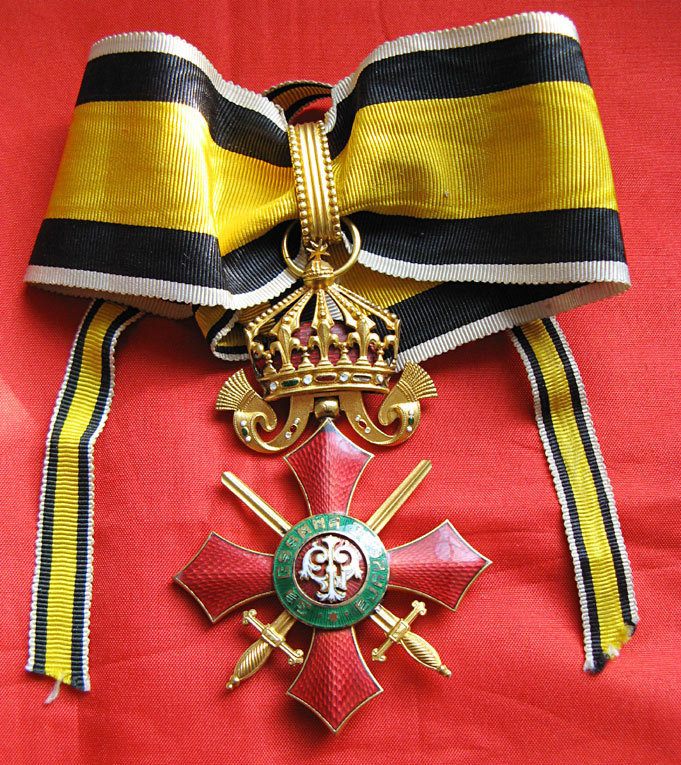
Order of Military Merit III grade with crown and swords

== Republic of Bulgaria ==
Order of Military Merit Орден „За военна заслуга“
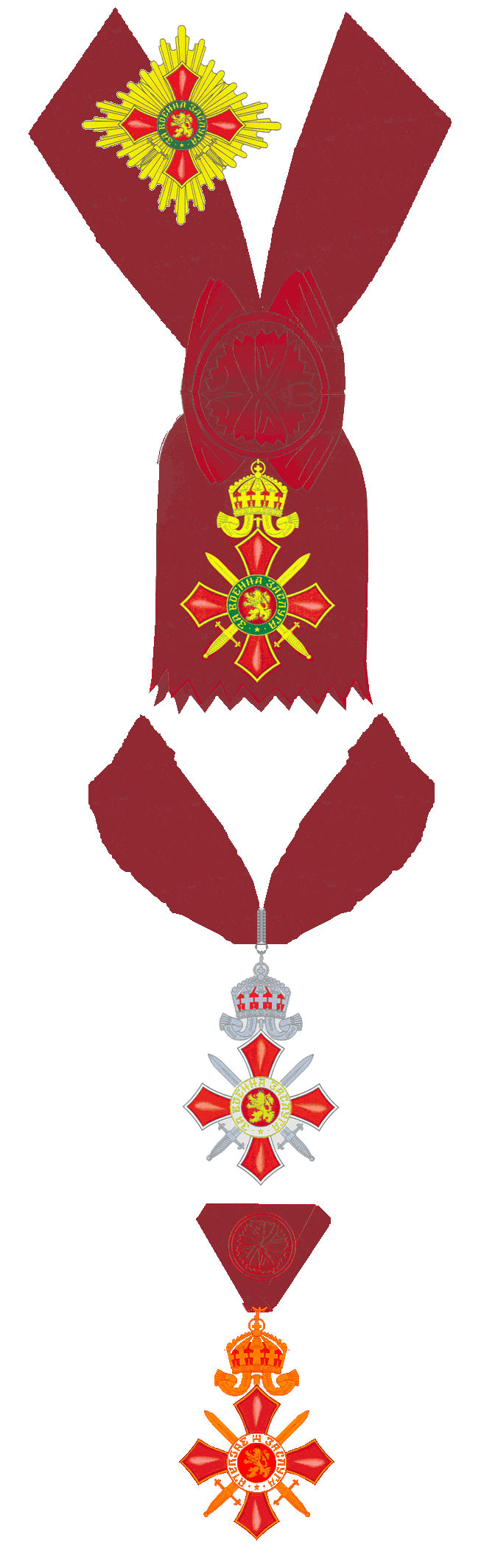
- The three grades of the Order

Awarded by The President of Bulgaria
- Type: State Order
- Religious affiliation: Bulgarian Orthodox
- Ribbon: Red
- Eligibility: Military Personnel.
- Awarded for: Awarded for great contributions for the development and the consolidation of the Bulgarian Army, for participation in peacekeeping, peacemaking and humanitarian operations, for long and immaculate service and contribution for the national security and civil order in Bulgaria.
- Status: Currently awarded
- Grand Master: President Rosen Plevneliev
- Grades: Grand Cross; Commander; Officer

Precedence
- Next (higher): Order of Saints Cyril and Methodius
- Next (lower): Order of the Madara Horseman
- Equivalent: Order of Civil Merit
- The ribbon of the Order

The Order of Military Merit is the third highest order in Bulgaria. It was re-established with the Law for the Orders and Medals of the Republic of Bulgaria on 13 June 2003. It is awarded by the president of the nation.

=== Gallery ===
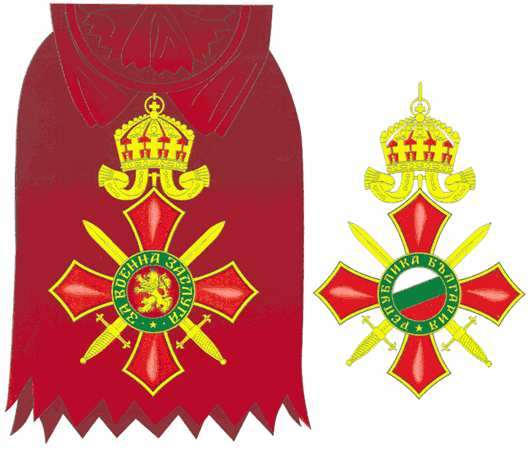
Order of Military Merit I grade (obverse and reverse)

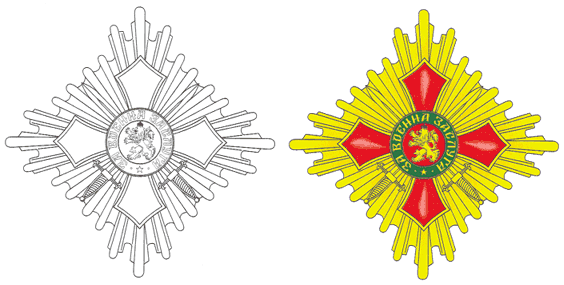
Star of the Order of Military Merit I grade (obverse)

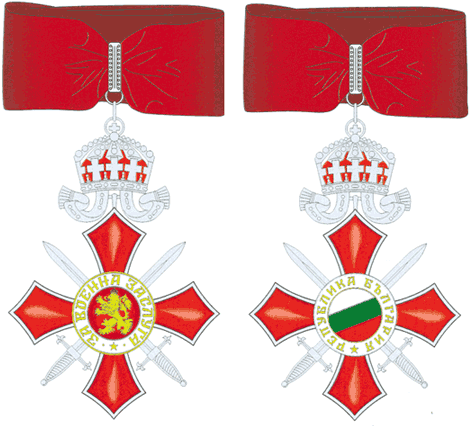
Order of Military Merit II grade (obverse and reverse)

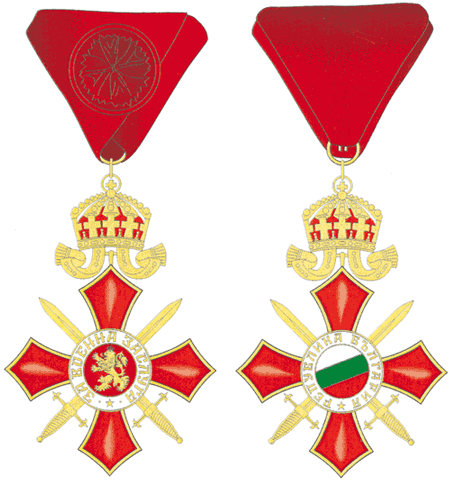
Order of Military Merit III grade (obverse and reverse)
