= National Order of Labour (Bulgaria) =

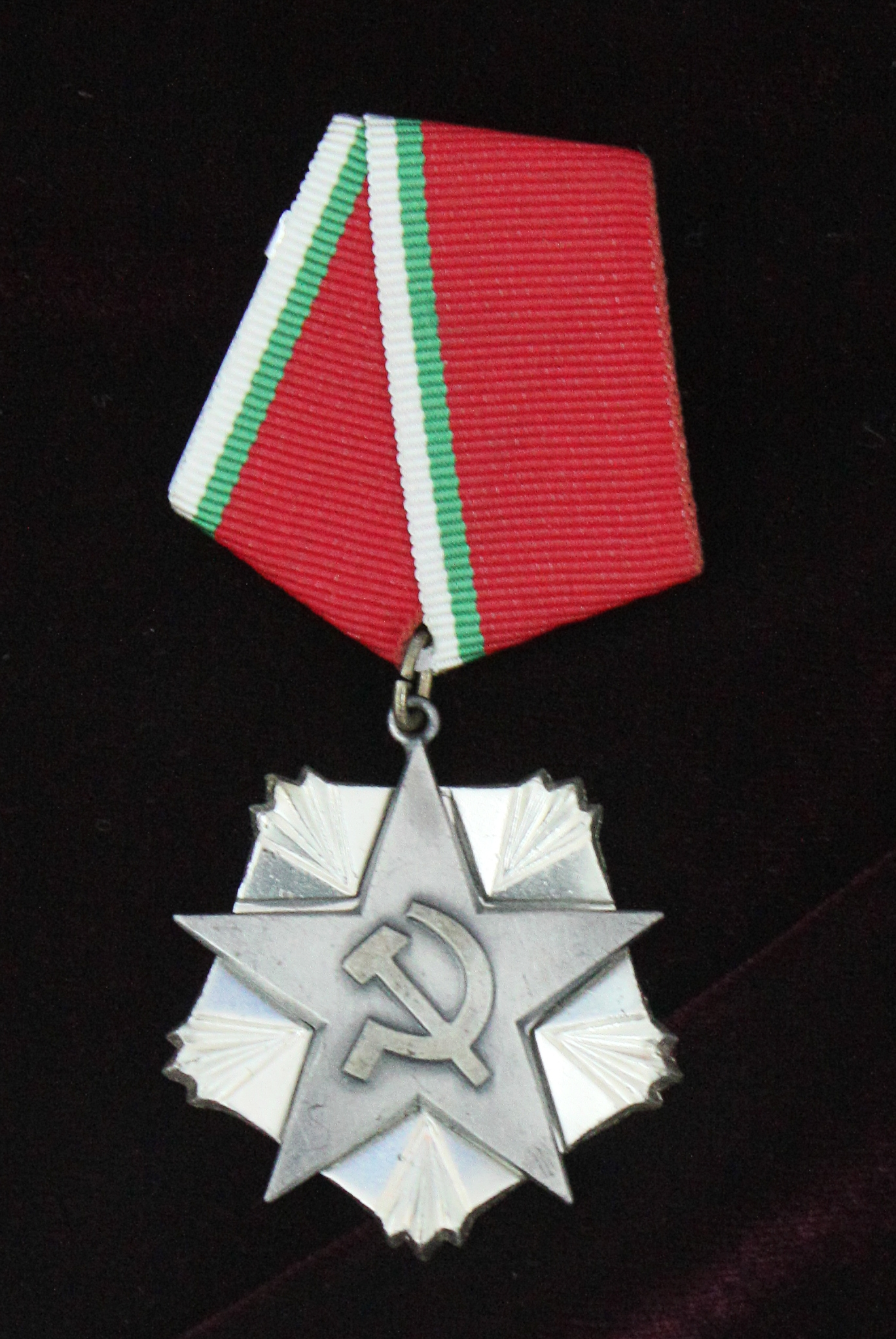
- Type: Order
- Presented by: The Bulgarian monarch (1944–1946), People's Republic of Bulgaria (1946–1991)
- Eligibility: Bulgarian and foreign citizens
- Status: obsolete since 1991
- Established: 1945
- The ribbon of the order

Precedence
- Next (higher): Order of Civil Merit (until 1946)
- Next (lower): Order of 9 September 1944

The National Order of Labour was an Order of Merit of the Kingdom of Bulgaria from 1945 to 1946, and of the People's Republic of Bulgaria from 1946 to 1990. It came in three grades.

== Royal Order ==
Royal Order of National Labour царски Поръчка на националното трудово

Awarded by The King of the Bulgarians
- Type: Dynastic Order
- Royal house: House of Saxe-Coburg-Gotha-Koháry
- Religious affiliation: Bulgarian Orthodox
- Ribbon: Red with a thin Green stripe and a thin White stripe on the Edge (Colours of the Flag of Bulgaria)
- Eligibility: Bulgarians and foreigners
- Awarded for: Excellence of outstanding achievements/innovations or excellence in organisation. Also awarded to artists and scientists for long service to the nation.
- Status: Unconstituted
- Sovereign: King Simeon II
- Grades: Knight/Dame Commander; Knight/Dame Officer; Knight/Dame

Precedence
- Next (higher): Royal Order of Civil Merit; Royal Order of Military Merit
- Next (lower): Royal Order of 9 September 1944
- The ribbon of the Order

== Bibliography ==
- http://www.medals.org.uk/bulgaria/peoples-republic/bulgaria-pr017.htm
